= Order of the Crown of Kelantan =

Honorific order of the Sultanate of Kelantan

Order of the Crown of Kelantan Darjah Kebesaran Mahkota Kelantan Yang Amat Mulia

Awarded by Sultan of Kelantan
- Type: Order
- Established: 9 August 1916
- Royal house: House of Long Yunus
- Ribbon: Red; Blue
- Status: Currently constituted
- Founder: Muhammad IV of Kelantan
- Sultan: Muhammad V of Kelantan
- Grades: Knight Grand Commander; Knight Commander; Commander
- Post-nominals: SPMK; DPMK; PMK

Precedence
- Next (higher): Royal Family Order of Kelantan
- Next (lower): Order of the Life of the Crown of Kelantan
- Ribbon bar of the order

The Most Illustrious Order of the Crown of Kelantan or the Star of Muhammad (Malay: Darjah Kebesaran Mahkota Kelantan Yang Amat Mulia or Bintang Al-Muhammadi) is an honorific order of the Sultanate of Kelantan.

It is awarded in three classes:

- Knight Grand Commander (Seri Paduka-S.P.M.K.),
- Knight Commander (Dato' Paduka-D.P.M.K.) and
- Commander (Paduka-P.M.K.).

Male and female recipients of these royal awards, the Seri Paduka Mahkota Kelantan (SPMK) and the Dato' Paduka Mahkota Kelantan (DPMK) are entitled to be addressed with the honorary title “Dato'” and their female spouse “Datin”. There is no accompanying title for their male spouse.

== Notable recipients ==
=== Knight Grand Commander (SPMK) ===
- 1933: Nik Ahmad Kamil
- 1967: Abdul Hamid Bidin
- 1967: ~~Tengku Razaleigh Hamzah~~ (revoked on 2 December 2010)
- 1968: Ismail Petra of Kelantan
- 1968: Murad Ahmad
- 1972: Sardon Jubir
- 1981: Mohamed Zahir Ismail
- 1988: Tengku Ampuan Rahimah
- 1988: Raja Perempuan Budriah
- 1992: Tunku Ampuan Najihah
- 1994: Ibrahim Ismail of Johor
- 1994: Tunku Puan Nora
- 2004: Endon Mahmood
- 2004: Najib Razak
- 2004: Mohd Zahidi Zainuddin
- 2005: Ahmad Fairuz Abdul Halim
- 2010: Tengku Mohamad Rizam
- 2010: Rosmah Mansor
- 2010: Zaki Azmi
- 2011: Tengku Amir Shah
- 2011: Zulkifeli Mohd Zin
- 2014: Raja Mohamed Affandi
- 2014: Arifin Zakaria
- 2016: Sallehuddin of Kedah
- 2018: Tengku Permaisuri Norashikin
- 2022: Sultanah Nur Diana Petra Abdullah
- 2022: Sofie Louise Johansson Petra
- 2022: Pengiran Muda Abdul Qawi
- 2024: Anwar Ibrahim

=== Knight Commander (DPMK) ===
- 1939: Tengku Mahmood Mahyideen
- 1964: Abdul Hamid Bidin
- 1978: Hashim Aman
- 1997: Megat Junid
- 1999: Arifin Zakaria
- 2003: Chan Kong Choy
- 2003: Chor Chee Heung
- 2004: Ng Yen Yen
- 2004: Kalimullah Masheerul Hassan
- 2005: Ahmad Zahid Hamidi
- 2009: Tiong King Sing
- 2011: Mohamed Apandi Ali
- 2016: Zainal Rahim Seman
- 2017: Aini Ideris
- 2018: Husaini Omar

=== Commander (PMK) ===
- Tengku Ahmad Rithauddeen Ismail (1964)
- Mohd Sany Abdul Ghaffar (1968)

== See also ==
- Orders, decorations, and medals of the Malaysian states and federal territories
- Orders, decorations, and medals of Kelantan
- List of post-nominal letters (Kelantan)
