= Ismail Petra of Kelantan =

Sultan of Kelantan (r. 1979–2010)

Ismail Petra إسماعيل ڤيترا

Sultan of Kelantan
- Reign: 30 March 1979 – 13 September 2010
- Coronation: 30 March 1980
- Predecessor: Sultan Yahya Petra
- Successor: Sultan Muhammad V
- Menteri Besar: See list: Mohamed Yaacob Nik Abdul Aziz Nik Mat
- Born: Tengku Ismail Petra ibni Tengku Yahya Petra; 11 November 1949; Istana Jahar, Kota Bharu, Kelantan, Federation of Malaya (now Malaysia)
- Died: 28 September 2019 (aged 69); Raja Perempuan Zainab II Hospital, Kota Bharu, Kelantan, Malaysia
- Burial: 28 September 2019; Langgar Royal Mausoleum, Kota Bharu, Kelantan, Malaysia
- Spouse: Tengku Anis Binti Tengku Abdul Hamid (m. 1968); Elia Suhana Binti Ahmad (m. 2007; div. 2010)
- Issue: Tengku Muhammad Faris Petra; Tengku Muhammad Faiz Petra; Tengku Muhammad Fakhry Petra; Tengku Amalin A’ishah Putri
Names
- Sultan Ismail Petra ibni Almarhum Sultan Yahya Petra
Regnal name
- Tuanku Ismail Petra ibni Almarhum Sultan Yahya Petra
- House: Long Yunus
- Father: Sultan Yahya Petra Ibni Almarhum Sultan Ibrahim
- Mother: Tengku Zainab Binti Tengku Muhammad Petra
- Religion: Sunni Islam

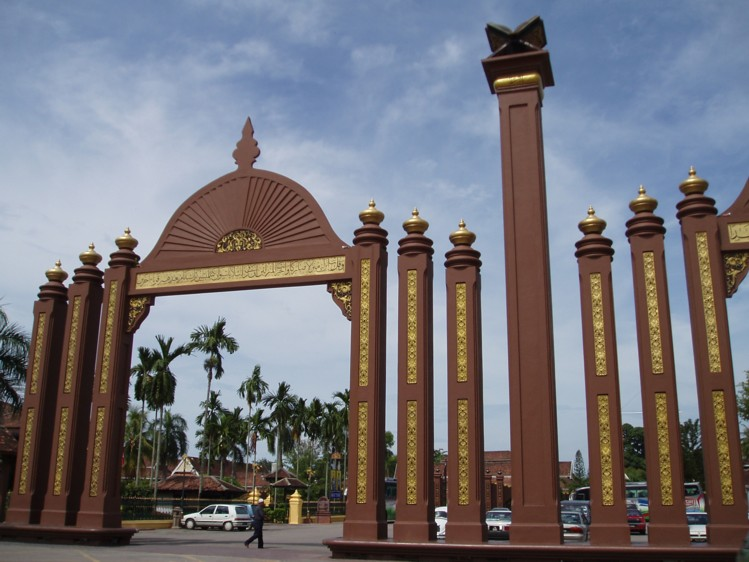
Sultan Ismail Petra Arch, Kota Bharu.

Sultan Ismail Petra ibni Almarhum Sultan Yahya Petra (Jawi: سلطان إسماعيل ڤيترا ابن المرحوم سلطان يحيى ڤيترا; 11 November 1949 – 28 September 2019) was the 28th sultan of Kelantan and the 11th sultan of modern Kelantan, reigning from 30 March 1979 until 13 September 2010 after being deemed incapacitated following a stroke.

== Early life and education ==
Ismail Petra was born at the Istana Jahar in Kota Bharu, Kelantan on 11 November 1949. He was the only son and youngest child of Sultan Yahya Petra by his first wife, Raja Perempuan Zainab II.

Growing up with four elder siblings, namely, Tengku Merjan, Tengku Rozan, Tengku Salwani and Tengku Rohani, Ismail Petra received his secondary education at Sultan Ismail College, Kota Bharu before being tutored by a special English language teacher.

In 1968, Ismail Petra joined the Government Administrative Services as an officer and was attached to the Kelantan State Secretary Office for a year. He then worked at the Land and District Office in Kota Bharu. During this time, he gained vast experience and extensive knowledge on all fields of administration.

On 8 January 2002, he was conferred an Honorary Doctorate of Philosophy in Political Science from the Ramkhamhaeng University, Thailand.

=== Crown Prince and Regent of Kelantan ===
Ismail Petra was made the Crown Prince (Tengku Mahkota) of Kelantan on 11 November 1967 at the Istana Balai Besar, Kota Bharu, Kelantan.

Additionally, Ismail Petra was appointed the Regent (Pemangku Raja) of Kelantan on three occasions. The first was from 6 July 1974 to 25 July 1974 when his father performed the functions of the King of Malaysia (Yang di-Pertuan Agong). The second time was from 12 July 1975 to 28 August 1975 when his father was visiting Europe. The third time was when his father was elected King of Malaysia from 21 September 1975 until his death on 29 March 1979.

== Sultan of Kelantan ==
Ismail Petra succeeded his father as the Sultan of Kelantan on 30 March 1979. A year later, on 30 March 1980, he was crowned as the Sultan of Kelantan in the throne room of the Istana Balai Besar in Kota Bharu.

=== Military ===
Sultan Ismail Petra was commissioned as an honorary major in the Territorial Army Regiment on 1 November 1974. He was elevated to lieutenant colonel on 1 January 1976. On 15 March 1988, he was appointed honorary lieutenant colonel in the Territorial Army Regiment and also honorary major-general and colonel-in-chief of the Royal Artillery Regiment in 1997.

=== Other posts ===
Sultan Ismail Petra was proclaimed the first Chancellor of Universiti Malaysia Kelantan on 10 August 2008.

== Family life ==
Sultan Ismail Petra married Raja Perempuan Tengku Anis binti Tengku Abdul Hamid on 4 December 1968 when they were both 19 years old. The royal couple had four children:

- Tengku Muhammad Faris Petra (born 6 October 1969, later Sultan Muhammad V). Married Tengku Zubaidah binti Tengku Norudin (née Kangsadal Pipitpakdee), a member of the Pattani royal family on 15 November 2004, and they divorced in 2008. He next married Jana Jakoubková, a Czech citizen on 30 October 2010, who was given the title Sultanah Nur Diana Petra. Later, he married Oksana Voevodina, a Russian model on 7 June 2018, and divorced in 2019. He has a son by Oksana Voevodina:
  - Tengku Ismail Leon Petra (born 21 May 2019)
- Tengku Muhammad Faiz Petra (born 20 January 1974). Married Che Puan Sofie Louise Johansson Petra, a Swedish citizen on 19 April 2019. They have a son:
  - Tengku Muhammad Johan Petra (born 17 July 2023)
- Tengku Muhammad Fakhry Petra, Tengku Mahkota Kelantan (born 7 April 1978). Married Manohara Odelia Pinot, an Indonesian model on 26 August 2008, and divorced in 2009.
- Tengku Amalin A’ishah Putri, Tengku Maharani Putri (born 26 June 1984). Married Prince Abdul Qawi of Brunei on 27 June 2013. They have four children, three daughters and one son:
  - Pengiran Anak Tengku Afeefah Musyafaah Bolkiah Putri (born 13 April 2014)
  - Pengiran Anak Tengku Azzahra Iffatul Bolkiah Putri (born 24 June 2016)
  - Pengiran Anak Tengku Zaafirah Muizzah Bolkiah Putri (born 12 February 2020)
  - Pengiran Anak Tengku Abdul Muhaimin Bolkiah Petra (born 26 June 2022)

Sultan Ismail Petra also had a second wife, Cik Puan Elia Suhana Ahmad, whom he married on 23 December 2007. It was reported that Sultan Ismail Petra, filed an application for verification of his divorce from his second wife, at the Syariah High Court on 9 March 2010. However, the Syariah Court of Appeal rejected an application to validate the divorce pronouncement allegedly uttered by Sultan Ismail Petra against his second wife on 30 March 2011.

== Incapacitation ==
Sultan Ismail Petra suffered a massive stroke on 14 May 2009. He received follow-up treatments at the Universiti Sains Malaysia Hospital, Kubang Kerian. The Kelantan government then appointed medical specialists to form a medical panel to check his health. When Sultan Ismail Petra remained ill, the panel decided that he was not capable of ruling the state and it was decided that his eldest son, Crown Prince Tengku Muhammad Faris Petra be crowned the new sultan on 13 September 2010 by order of the Kelantan Succession Council. However, lawyers acting on behalf of Sultan Ismail Petra filed a petition to the Federal Court to have the appointment of the Crown Prince as the Sultan of Kelantan nullified, claiming that the appointment was unconstitutional.

== Death and state funeral ==
Sultan Ismail Petra died of heart failure on 28 September 2019 at 8:11 am at the Royal Ward of Raja Perempuan Zainab II Hospital, Kota Bharu, aged 69. On that day, the Menteri Besar of Kelantan Ahmad Yakob officially announced his death. Prime Minister Mahathir Mohamad said of Sultan Ismail Petra:

But when Sultan Ismail Petra was the ruler, I had good relations with His Highness. I found him an orderly person and easy to work with.

— Mahathir Mohamad

On the same day, a state funeral was held. At the funeral were the Yang di-Pertuan Agong Sultan Abdullah of Pahang and the Raja Permaisuri Agong Tunku Azizah Aminah Maimunah Iskandariah, the Sultan of Brunei Hassanal Bolkiah, Tuanku Sirajuddin of Perlis and the Raja Perempuan of Perlis Tuanku Fauziah. Also in attendance were the Deputy Prime Minister Wan Azizah Wan Ismail and her husband Anwar Ibrahim. He was buried near the grave of his father, Sultan Yahya Petra at the Langgar Royal Mausoleum in Kota Bharu, Kelantan.

== Awards and recognitions ==
=== Honours of Kelantan ===
- Grand Master (30 March 1979 – 13 September 2010) and Recipient of the Royal Family Order of Kelantan (DK) (10 July 1968)
- Grand Master (30 March 1979 – 13 September 2010) and Knight Grand Commander of the Order of the Crown of Kelantan (SPMK) – Dato' (10 July 1968)
- Grand Master (30 March 1979 – 13 September 2010) and Knight Grand Commander of the Order of the Life of the Crown of Kelantan (SJMK) – Dato'
- Knight Grand Commander and Grand Master of the Order of the Loyalty to the Crown of Kelantan (SPSK) – Dato'
- Founding Grand Master of the Order of the Noble Crown of Kelantan (SPKK) – Dato'
- Grand Master of the Order of the Most Distinguished and Most Valiant Warrior (PYGP)
- Silver medal of the Sultan Yahya Petra Coronation Medal (1961)
- Sultan Ismail Petra Coronation Medal (30 March 1980)
- Sultan Ismail Petra Silver Jubilee Medal (30 March 2004)

=== Honours of Malaysia and its other states ===
- Malaysia
  - Recipient of the Order of the Crown of the Realm (DMN) (1979)
- Johor
  - First Class of the Royal Family Order of Johor (DK I)
- Kedah
  - Member of the Royal Family Order of Kedah (DK) (1985)
- Negeri Sembilan
  - Member of the Royal Family Order of Negeri Sembilan (DKNS) (1981)
- Perak
  - Recipient of the Royal Family Order of Perak (DK) (1985)
- Perlis
  - Recipient of the Perlis Family Order of the Gallant Prince Syed Putra Jamalullail (DK)
- Selangor
  - First Class of the Royal Family Order of Selangor (DK I) (1988)
- Terengganu
  - Member first class of the Family Order of Terengganu (DK I) (1985)
- Sarawak
  - Knight Grand Commander of the Order of the Star of Hornbill Sarawak (DP) – Datuk Patinggi
  - Darjah Paduka Seri Sarawak (DPSS)

=== Foreign ===
- Brunei
  - Recipient of Royal Family Order of the Crown of Brunei (DKMB) (15 July 1988)
  - Sultan of Brunei Silver Jubilee Medal (5 October 1992)

=== Honorary doctorate ===
- Thailand
  - Honorary Doctorate of Philosophy in Political Science from the Ramkhamhaeng University – (Dr.) (8 January 2002)

=== Places were named after him ===
Several places were named after him, including:

- Kolej Islam Antarabangsa Sultan Ismail Petra (KIAS) in Nilam Puri, Kelantan
- Sekolah Menengah Kebangsaan Ismail Petra (1), a secondary school at Kompleks Sekolah-Sekolah Wakaf Mek Zainab in Kota Bharu, Kelantan
- Sekolah Menengah Kebangsaan Ismail Petra (2), a secondary school in Kampung Telipot Kawasan Perindustrian Lundang, Kota Bharu, Kelantan
- Sekolah Kebangsaan Ismail Petra (1), a primary school in Kompleks Sekolah-Sekolah Wakaf Mek Zainab, Kota Bharu, Kelantan
- Sekolah Kebangsaan Ismail Petra (2), a primary school in Jalan Long Yunus, Kota Bharu, Kelantan
- Jalan Sultan Ismail Petra in Kelantan
- Sultan Ismail Petra Bridge in Kota Bharu, Kelantan
- Sultan Ismail Petra Silver Jubilee Mosque in Rantau Panjang, Kelantan
- Al-Sultan Ismail Petra Mosque, Kubang Kerian, Kelantan
- Sultan Ismail Petra Mosque, Kota Bharu, Kelantan
- Ismail Petra Mosque, Tanah Merah, Kelantan
- Al-Ismaili Mosque, Wakaf Bharu, Kelantan
- Sultan Ismail Petra Islamic Silver Jubilee Complex, Panji, Kelantan
- Sultan Ismail Petra Hospital in Kuala Krai, Kelantan
- Sultan Ismail Petra Arch in Kota Bharu, Kelantan
- Sultan Ismail Petra Shooting Range in Pengkalan Chepa, Kelantan
- Sultan Ismail Petra Ecosystem Protection Park in Jeli, Kelantan
- Sultan Ismail Petra Airport in Kota Bharu, Kelantan

== Issue ==
Name	Birth	Marriage		Their children	Their grandchildren
Name	Birth	Date	Spouse	Their children	Their grandchildren
Tengku Muhammad Faris Petra (later Sultan Muhammad V)	6 October 1969	2004; Divorced 2008	Tengku Zubaidah		
Tengku Muhammad Faris Petra (later Sultan Muhammad V)	6 October 1969	2004; Divorced 2008	Tengku Zubaidah	None	
Tengku Muhammad Faris Petra (later Sultan Muhammad V)	6 October 1969	2010	Nur Diana Petra	None	
Tengku Muhammad Faris Petra (later Sultan Muhammad V)	6 October 1969	2018; Divorced 2019	Oksana Voevodina	Tengku Ismail leon Petra	None
Tengku Muhammad Fa-iz Petra	20 January 1974	2019	Sofie Louise Johansson Petra	Tengku Muhammad Johan Petra	None
Tengku Muhammad Fa-iz Petra	20 January 1974	2019	Sofie Louise Johansson Petra	None	
Tengku Muhammad Fakhry Petra	7 April 1978	2008; Divorced 2009	Manohara Odelia Pinot		
Tengku Muhammad Fakhry Petra	7 April 1978	2008; Divorced 2009	Manohara Odelia Pinot	None	
Tengku Amalin A’ishah Putri	26 June 1984	2013	Pengiran Muda 'Abdul Qawi	Pengiran Anak Tengku Afeefah Musyafaah Bolkiah Putri	None
Tengku Amalin A’ishah Putri	26 June 1984	2013	Pengiran Muda 'Abdul Qawi	Pengiran Anak Tengku Azzarah Iffatul Bolkiah Putri	None
Tengku Amalin A’ishah Putri	26 June 1984	2013	Pengiran Muda 'Abdul Qawi	Pengiran Anak Tengku Zaafirah Muizzah Bolkiah Putri	None
Tengku Amalin A’ishah Putri	26 June 1984	2013	Pengiran Muda 'Abdul Qawi	Pengiran Anak Tengku Abdul Muhaimin Bolkiah Petra	None

Regnal titles
Preceded by Sultan Yahya Petra	Sultan of Kelantan; 1979 – 2010	Succeeded by Sultan Muhammad V
