= Raja Perempuan Tengku Anis =

Queen consort of Kelantan from 1979 to 2010

Tengku Anis تڠکو أنيس
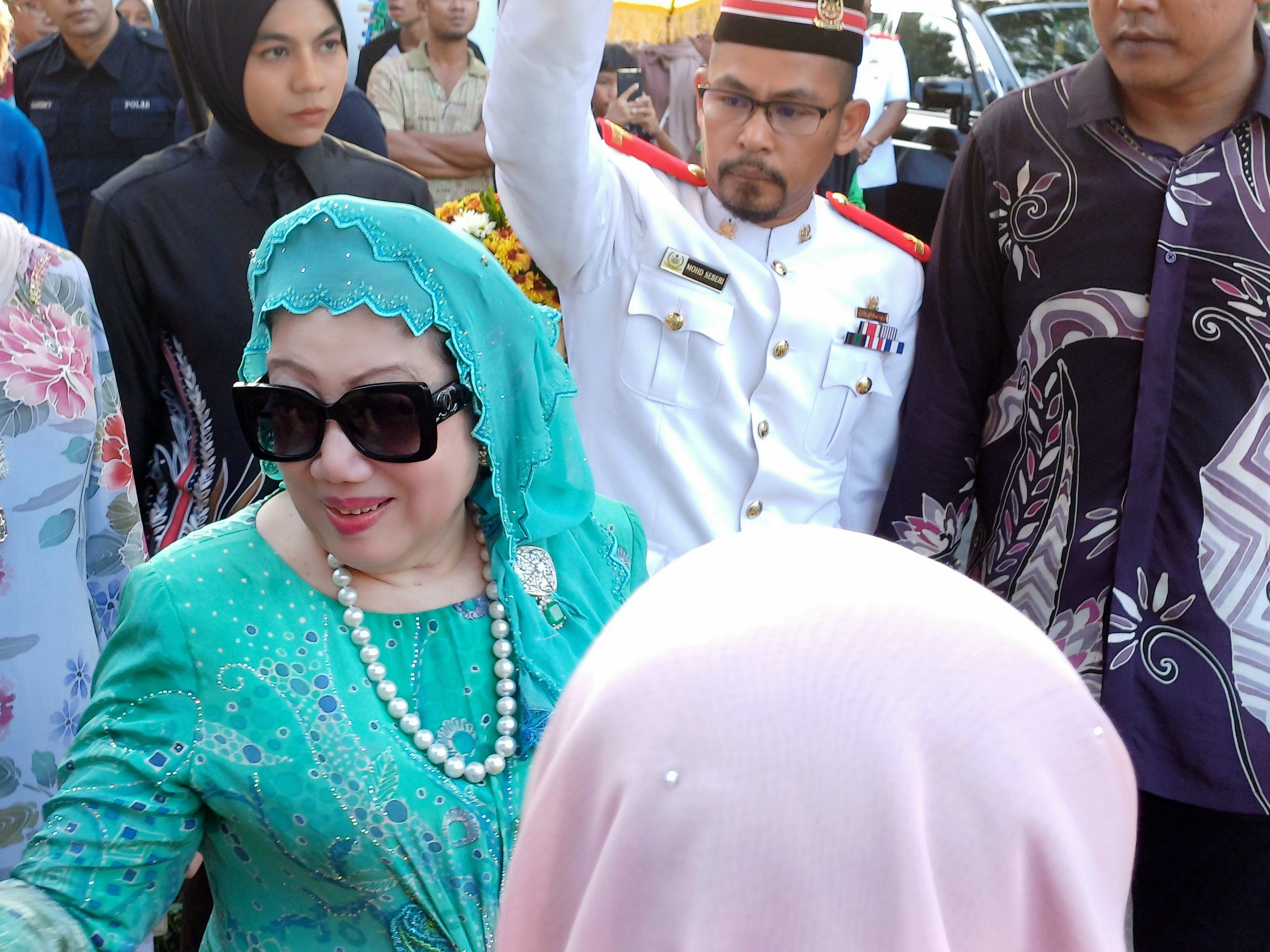
- Raja Perempuan Tengku Anis in 2023

Raja Perempuan of Kelantan
- Tenure: 30 March 1979 – 13 September 2010
- Coronation: 30 March 1980
- Predecessor: Raja Perempuan Zainab
- Successor: Sultanah Nur Diana Petra (as Sultanah)

Tengku Ampuan Mahkota of Kelantan
- Tenure: 1 January 1969 – 30 March 1979
- Proclamation: 1 January 1969
- Predecessor: Tengku Zainab
- Successor: Tengku Zubaidah
- Born: 6 January 1949 (age 77); Palm Manor, Kota Bharu, Kelantan, British Malaya (now Malaysia)
- Spouse: Sultan Ismail Petra (m. 1968; died 2019)
- Issue: Tengku Muhammad Faris Petra; Tengku Muhammad Faiz Petra; Tengku Muhammad Fakhry Petra; Tengku Amalin A’ishah Putri
Names
- Tengku Anis binti Tengku Abdul Hamid
Regnal name
- Raja Perempuan Tengku Anis binti Almarhum Tengku Abdul Hamid
- House: Long Yunus
- Father: Tengku Abdul Hamid bin Tengku Muda Sulong Abdul Putra
- Mother: Tengku Azizah binti Tengku Mohd Hamzah
- Religion: Sunni Islam

Raja Perempuan Tengku Anis binti Almarhum Tengku Abdul Hamid (Jawi: راج ڤرمڤوان تڠکو أنيس بنت المرحوم تڠكو عبدالحميد; born 6 January 1949) is the former Raja Perempuan (Queen Consort) of Kelantan. She is the widow of the late Sultan Ismail Petra, the 28th Sultan of Kelantan and the mother of Sultan Muhammad V, the current and 29th Sultan of Kelantan.

== Biography ==
Tengku Anis was born on 6 January 1949 at Palm Manor, Kota Bharu as a daughter of Tengku Abdul Hamid bin Tengku Muda Sulong Abdul Putra (Thai: มานพ พิพิธภักดี; RTGS: Manop Phiphitphakdi) and his wife, Tengku Azizah binti Tengku Sri Maharaja Muhammad Hamzah. Her paternal grandfather, Tengku Abdul Putra, was the eldest son of the last reigning King of Jering, which was then one of the seven states in Southern Siam under Malay rule. Her maternal grandfather, Tengku Muhammad Hamzah, was the last Chief Minister of Kelantan appointed by the Sultan and the first post-independence Menteri Besar.

She received religious education from a personal tutor and completed her formal primary and secondary education at Zainab English School. She was conferred an Honorary Degree doctorate of Philosophy in Human Resources Development from the Ramkhamhaeng University, Thailand on 26 February 2005.

On 4 December 1968, Tengku Anis married Tengku Ismail Petra, the then-Tengku Mahkota (Crown Prince) of Kelantan at Istana Kota Lama in Kota Bharu. Subsequently, she was bestowed the title of Tengku Ampuan Mahkota (Crown Princess) of Kelantan on 1 January 1969.

In 1979, Sultan Yahya Petra (at the time King of Malaysia) died and Tengku Ismail Petra was installed as the Sultan of Kelantan; subsequently, she was installed as the Raja Perempuan (Queen consort) of Kelantan on 30 March 1979. Her husband, Sultan Ismail Petra, reigned until 13 September 2010, and was succeeded by their eldest son, Tengku Muhammad Faris Petra.

As a queen dowager, she is now styled as "Yang Maha Mulia Raja Perempuan Tengku Anis binti Almarhum Tengku Abdul Hamid".

== Issue ==
The royal couple have four children:

- Sultan Muhammad V (born as Tengku Muhammad Faris Petra; 6 October 1969), the current Sultan of Kelantan. He is married to Sultanah Nur Diana Petra since 2010.
- Dr. Tengku Muhammad Fa-iz Petra (born 20 January 1974), the former Tengku Mahkota of Kelantan. He is married to Che Puan Sofie Louise Johansson Petra since 2019 and has issue.
- Tengku Muhammad Fakhry Petra (born 7 April 1978), the current Tengku Mahkota of Kelantan. He was married to Manohara Odelia Pinot from 2008 to 2009.
- Tengku Amalin A’ishah Putri (born 26 June 1984), the Tengku Maharani Putri. She is married to Prince Abdul Qawi of Brunei since 2013 and has issue.

== Social contributions ==
Tengku Anis always pays serious attention to the welfare of the people and always shows a deep interest in the movement of charities in the state of Kelantan. She is the patron of various organisations such as:

- Founder of Darul Aitam Orphanage
- Founder of Tengku Anis Kindergarten
- Patron of Kelantan Foundation for the Disabled
- Patron of Kelantan Handicraft Foundation
- Patron of Kelantan Heart Patient Foundation

== Honours ==
Styles of Tengku Anis
- Reference style: Her Royal Highness
- Spoken style: Your Royal Highness
- Alternative style: Tuanku

She was awarded:

=== Honours of Kelantan ===
- Recipient of the Royal Family Order of Kelantan (DK)
- Knight Grand Commander of the Order of the Crown of Kelantan (SPMK) – Dato'

=== Honours of Malaysia ===
- Kedah
  - Member of the Royal Family Order of Kedah (DK)
- Negeri Sembilan
  - Member of the Royal Family Order of Negeri Sembilan (DKNS) (1998)
- Perlis
  - Recipient of the Perlis Family Order of the Gallant Prince Syed Putra Jamalullail (DK) (1999)
  - Knight Grand Commander of the Order of the Crown of Perlis (SPMP) – Dato' Seri (1988)
- Johor
  - First Class of the Royal Family Order of Johor (DK I) (2000)
- Selangor
  - Second Class of the Royal Family Order of Selangor (DK II)

=== Foreign honours ===
- Brunei
  - Family Order of Laila Utama (DK)
  - Sultan of Brunei Silver Jubilee Medal (5 October 1992)

=== Honorary degrees ===
- Malaysia
  - Honorary Doctor of Philosophy in Management from Kolej Universiti Sains dan Teknologi Malaysia - 23 February 2006
  - Honorary Degree of Doctor of Agriculture Development from University Putra Malaysia - 16 September 2006
- Thailand
  - Honorary Doctor of Philosophy in Human Resources Development from Ramkhamhaeng University - 26 February 2005

=== Places named after her ===
Several places were named after her, including:

- Tengku Anis Hospital in Pasir Puteh, Kelantan
- Tengku Anis Kindergarten in Kota Bharu, Kelantan
- Tengku Anis Municipal Park in Kota Bharu, Kelantan
- Tengku Anis Orchid Park in Kota Bharu, Kelantan
- Tengku Anis Bazaar in Kota Bharu, Kelantan
- Tengku Anis Library, a library at Universiti Teknologi MARA, Machang, Kelantan
- Pusat Dokumentasi Melayu Tengku Anis, Dewan Bahasa dan Pustaka Wilayah Timur in Kota Bharu, Kelantan

Malaysian royalty
Preceded by Tengku Zainab (as Raja Perempuan)	Consort of the Sultan of Kelantan; Raja Perempuan; 1979–2010	Succeeded by Che Puan Nur Diana Petra Abdullah (as Sultanah)
