= Murad Ahmad =

Yang Berbahagia Tan Sri Murad Ahmad PSM SPMK DJMK JMN SK PJK

Commissioner General of Prison
- In office 3 October 1957 – 24 July 1977
- Prime Minister: Tunku Abdul Rahman; Abdul Razak Hussein; Hussein Onn
- Minister: Tunku Abdul Rahman (Minister of Home Affairs); Ismail Abdul Rahman (Minister of Home Affairs); Ghazali Shafie (Minister of Home Affairs)

Deputy Commissioner General of Prison
- In office 1956–1957
- Prime Minister: Tunku Abdul Rahman (Minister of Home Affairs)
- Minister: Tunku Abdul Rahman (Minister of Home Affairs)
- Succeeded by: Ibrahim Mohamed

Personal details
- Born: 24 July 1921 Kedah, Unfederated Malay States, British Malaya
- Citizenship: Malaysian
- Education: Sultan Abdul Hamid College, Alor Setar
- Occupation: Prison Officer

Murad bin Ahmad (born 24 July 1921) was the 4th Commissioner General of Prison. He retired in 1977, succeeded by Ibrahim Mohamed.

== Honours ==
=== Honours of Malaysia ===
- Malaysia
  - Commander of the Order of Loyalty to the Crown of Malaysia (PSM) – Tan Sri (1977)
  - Companion of the Order of the Defender of the Realm (JMN) (1958)
- Kelantan
  - Knight Grand Commander of the Order of the Crown of Kelantan (SPMK) – Dato' (1968)
  - Knight Commander of the Order of the Life of the Crown of Kelantan (DJMK) – Dato'
  - Recipient of the Seri Kelantan Decoration (SK) (1952)
- Perak
  - Recipient of the Meritorious Service Medal (PJK) (1961)

| Preceded by Ft. Lt. WB Oliver | Director General of Prison of Malaysian Prison Department; 1957 - 1977 | Succeeded by Ibrahim Mohamed |
| Preceded by Ft. Lt. WB Oliver | Deputy Director General of Prison of Malaysian Prison Department; 1956 - 1957 | Succeeded by Ibrahim Mohamed |
