= Tengku Muhammad Fa-iz Petra =

Former Crown Prince of Kelantan

Tengku Muhammad Fa-iz Petra تڠكو محمد فائز ڤيترا
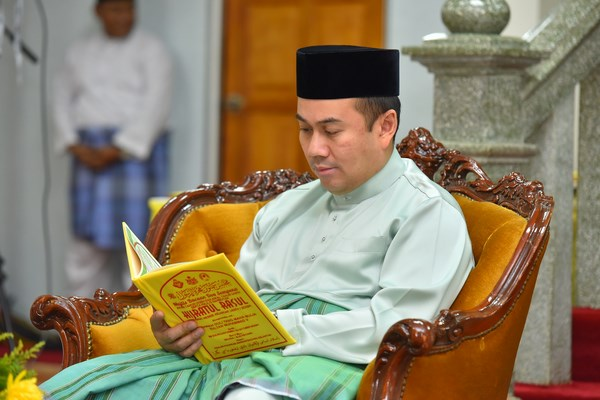
- Tengku Fa-iz at the Sambutan Hijratul Rasul Peringkat Negeri Kelantan 1437H/2015M

Tengku Mahkota of Kelantan
- Tenure: 18 October 2010 – 4 January 2024
- Predecessor: Tengku Muhammad Faris Petra
- Successor: Tengku Muhammad Fakhry Petra

Tengku Bendahara of Kelantan
- Tenure: 30 March 1989 – 18 October 2010
- Predecessor: Tengku Yahya Petra
- Successor: Tengku Muhammad Fakhry Petra
- Born: Tengku Muhammad Fa-iz Petra bin Tengku Ismail Petra; 20 January 1974 (age 52); Kota Bharu, Kelantan, Malaysia
- Spouse: Che Puan Sofie Louise Johansson Petra (m. 2019)
- Issue: Tengku Muhammad Johan Petra
Names
- Dr. Tengku Muhammad Fa-iz Petra ibni Almarhum Sultan Ismail Petra
- House: Long Yunus
- Father: Sultan Ismail Petra Ibni Almarhum Sultan Yahya Petra
- Mother: Tengku Anis Binti Tengku Abdul Hamid
- Religion: Sunni Islam

Tengku Muhammad Fa-iz Petra ibni Almarhum Sultan Ismail Petra (Jawi: تڠکو محمد فائز ڤيترا ابن المرحوم سلطان إسماعيل ڤيترا; born 20 January 1974) is a member of the Kelantan royal family who served as the Tengku Mahkota (Crown Prince) of Kelantan from 18 October 2010 to 4 January 2024.

He is the second of four children of the 28th Sultan of Kelantan, Sultan Ismail Petra and Raja Perempuan Tengku Anis. His two younger siblings are Tengku Muhammad Fakhry Petra and Tengku Amalin A’ishah Putri. His eldest brother is the 29th and current Sultan of Kelantan, Sultan Muhammad V who is also the fifteenth Yang di-Pertuan Agong of Malaysia.

== Biography ==
Tengku Fa-iz was born in Kota Bharu, Kelantan on 20 January 1974. He was conferred the title of Tengku Bendahara of Kelantan on 30 March 1989. He was also appointed as the President of the Kelantan Islamic Religious and Malay Customs Council (MAIK) from 21 June 2009 to 18 March 2019.

He received his complete education as follows:

- SK Sultan Ismail (1), Kota Bharu, Kelantan
- Alice Smith School, Kuala Lumpur
- Oakham School, Rutland, England, United Kingdom - 10A GCSE and 3A A-Level
- London School of Economics and Political Science, United Kingdom - BA History
- Università degli Studi di Firenze, Florence, Italy - Italian Language and Literature (Beginner and Intermediate)
- Institute of Classical Studies, University College London, United Kingdom - MA Ancient History and MPhil/PhD History (2010)

His PhD dissertation was about the transition between late antiquity and the early medieval period in north Etruria (400-900 AD).

Tengku Fa-iz was elevated to the position of Tengku Mahkota or heir presumptive to the throne of Kelantan upon deliberation of the Kelantan State Council of Succession which was chaired by Tengku Laksamana Kelantan Tengku Abdul Halim Ibni Almarhum Sultan Ibrahim. The ceremony to present the letter of appointment as Tengku Mahkota Kelantan was held at Istana Negeri in Kubang Kerian on 18 October 2010. According to the Kelantan State Constitution, Tengku Mahkota could be the ruler or regent when the Sultan is abroad for a period of more than 30 days or unable to carry out his duties as the ruler over the same period.

He was awarded the rank of First Admiral (Honorary) of the Royal Malaysian Navy (RMN) on 5 April 2013.

On 8 December 2016, Tengku Fa-iz was appointed as the Pemangku Raja (Regent) of Kelantan, following the appointment of his eldest brother, Sultan Muhammad V as the fifteenth Yang di-Pertuan Agong of Malaysia on 13 December 2016.

Tengku Fa-iz was appointed as Pro-Chancellor of the Universiti Malaysia Kelantan (UMK) on 19 September 2011 before being proclaimed as the Chancellor of the Universiti Malaysia Kelantan on 16 February 2017.

On 23 November 2022, Tengku Fa-iz was appointed as a Pro-Chancellor of the Universiti Malaysia Kelantan after his brother, Sultan Muhammad V proclaimed as the new Chancellor of the Universiti Malaysia Kelantan.

== Personal life ==
On 19 April 2019, Tengku Fa-iz married a Swedish citizen Che Puan Sofie Louise Johansson Petra at Istana Balai Besar in Kota Bharu. They met in London where Tengku Fa-iz was a student while Johansson was also studying and working there. For wedding presents the royal couple wished for donations to aid organisations in Kelantan. The solemnisation ceremony was performed by Dato’ Aria D’Raja cum Kelantan Syariah Court Chief Judge Dato' Daud Mohamad and was witnessed by the Tengku Laksamana of Kelantan Tengku Abdul Halim and the Member of Parliament for Gua Musang Tengku Razaleigh Hamzah.

The couple's first child is a son, Tengku Muhammad Johan Petra, born on 17 July 2023.

== Issue ==
Name	Born	Place birth	Age
His Highness Tengku Muhammad Johan Petra Bin Tengku Muhammad Fa-iz Petra	17 July 2023	Hospital Universiti Sains Malaysia (HUSM), Kubang Kerian, Kota Bharu, Kelantan	3 years

== Titles, styles, orders and recognitions ==
Styles of Tengku Muhammad Fa-iz Petra
- Reference style: His Highness
- Spoken style: Your Highness
- Alternative style: Tengku

The full title and style of Tengku Muhammad Fa-iz Petra :

His Highness Dr. Tengku Muhammad Fa-iz Petra ibni Almarhum Sultan Ismail Petra, D.K., S.P.M.K., D.M.K. (Kedah)

=== Honours of Kelantan ===
- Recipient of the Royal Family Order of Kelantan (DK) (30 March 2003)
- Knight Grand Commander of the Order of the Crown of Kelantan (SPMK) – Dato'
- Recipient of the Sultan Ismail Petra Coronation Medal (30 March 1980)
- Recipient of the Sultan Ismail Petra Silver Jubilee Medal (30 March 2004)
- Recipient of the Sultan Muhammad V Proclamation Medal (13 September 2010)

=== Malaysia and its other states ===
- Malaysia
  - Recipient of the General Service Medal (PPA)
  - Recipient of the 15th Yang di-Pertuan Agong Installation Medal
  - Recipient of the 16th Yang di-Pertuan Agong Installation Medal
- Kedah
  - Member of the Supreme Order of Sri Mahawangsa (DMK) – Dato' Seri Utama (30 September 2017)
  - Recipient of the Sultan Sallehuddin Installation Medal (22 October 2018)
- Perak
  - Recipient of the Sultan Nazrin Shah Installation Medal (6 May 2015)

=== Places named after him ===
- Tengku Muhammad Fa-iz Petra Jamek Mosque in Gua Musang, Kelantan

Tengku Muhammad Fa-iz Petra House of Kelantan
Regnal titles
Preceded by Tengku Muhammad Faris Petra	Tengku Mahkota of Kelantan; 2010–2024	Succeeded by Tengku Muhammad Fakhry Petra
