= Sultanah Nur Diana Petra =

Sultanah of Kelantan since 2022

Sultanah Nur Diana Petra سلطانة نور ديانا ڤيترا
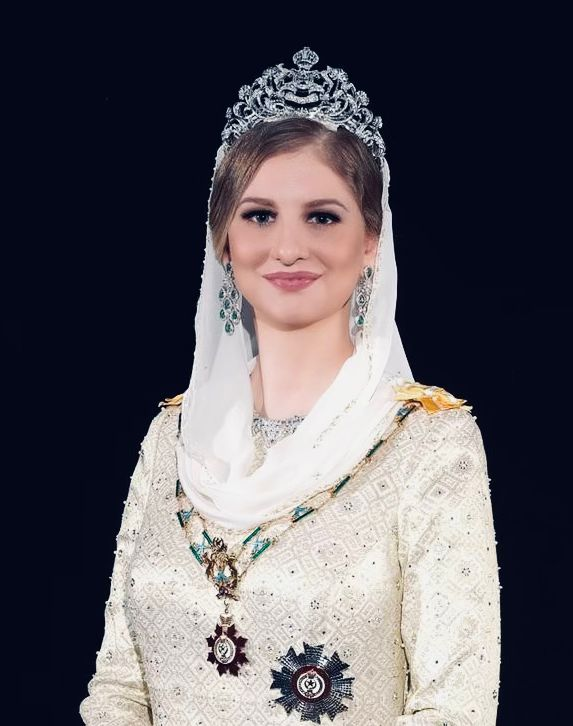
- Official photo; 2022

Sultanah of Kelantan
- Tenure: 2 August 2022 – present
- Proclamation: 12 November 2022
- Predecessor: Tengku Anis (as Raja Perempuan)
- Born: Jana Jakubková; 25 February 1988 (age 38); Prague, Czechoslovakia (presently Czech Republic)
- Spouse: Sultan Muhammad V (m. 2010)
Names
- Sultanah Nur Diana Petra Abdullah
- House: Long Yunus (by marriage)
- Religion: Sunni Islam

Sultanah Nur Diana Petra Abdullah (Jawi: سلطانة نور ديانا ڤيترا عبدالله; née Jana Jakubková; born 25 February 1988) is the Sultanah of Kelantan as the wife of Sultan Muhammad V, the 29th and current Sultan of the Malaysian state of Kelantan.

== Early life ==
Sultanah Nur Diana Petra was born as Jana Jakubková in Prague, Czech Republic formerly known as Czechoslovakia on 25 February 1988.

== Marriage ==
Jana Jakubková married Sultan Muhammad V of Kelantan on 30 October 2010. Before her marriage, she converted to Islam and changed her name to Nur Diana Petra Abdullah. As his wife, she was subsequently allowed to use the honorific prefix of Che Puan (literally "Lady") and the style of Yang Berbahagia (translated as "The Honourable").

== Public role ==
=== Proclamation as Sultanah of Kelantan ===
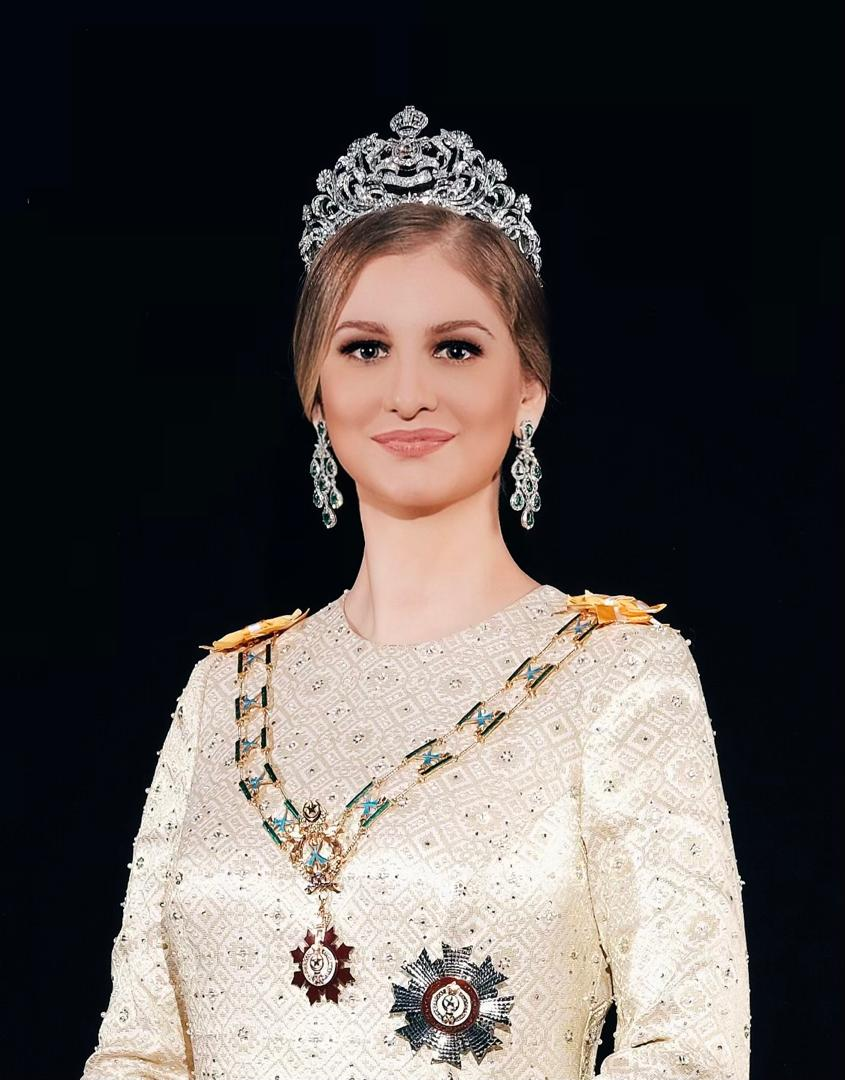
Official photo of the Sultanah wearing the Royal Kelantan orders; 2022

On 2 August 2022, Che Puan Nur Diana Petra was elevated to the rank of Sultanah of Kelantan with the style of Her Royal Highness (Duli Yang Maha Mulia) and the honorific prefix of Sultanah before her given name by her husband, Sultan Muhammad V.

As Sultanah of Kelantan, she often accompanies her husband at official and unofficial events.

=== Official appearances ===
Her first public appearance as Sultanah of Kelantan occurred on 13 September 2022 where she received a visit by a group from the Pertubuhan Kerabat D’Raja Kelantan (PKDK) at the Kubang Kerian State Palace. On 27 September 2022, she attended a dinner in conjunction with the 8th Asean Traditional Textile Symposium at Istana Negara, with the other royal consorts of the Malaysian States. In the same month, she and the then-Che Puan Mahkota (Crown Princess), Che Puan Sofie Louise Johansson Petra received Tengku Permaisuri Norashikin of Selangor for a high tea reception at Istana Kelantan in Jalan Wickham, Kuala Lumpur. She attended the investiture ceremony in conjunction with Sultan Muhammad V's 53rd birthday celebration on 12 November 2022: during the ceremony, she stood and kissed her husband's hand as a symbol of the menjunjung duli (respect) ceremony. On 14 November 2022, she and her husband attended a dinner in conjunction with the 2022 Presentation ceremony of the Association of Administrative Officers (one of the celebrations for the Sultan's birthday) in Kota Bharu.

On 18 April 2023, Sultanah Nur Diana Petra handed over a donation to the Kelantan Police Family Association (PERKEP) in Jalan Bayam, Kota Bharu. On 30 September 2023, The Sultanah was present at the Kelantan Government Dinner Ceremony for the celebrations regarding the 54th birthday of Sultan Muhammad V, held at the Tok Guru Hall, in Kota Bharu. On 6 October 2023, she attended the "2023 Kelantan Flora Festival" in Kota Bharu with Raja Perempuan Tengku Anis and Che Puan Sofie Louise Johansson Petra. In December 2023, the Sultanah and her husband received Al-Sultan Abdullah Ri’ayatuddin Al-Mustafa Billah Shah and Tunku Azizah Aminah Maimunah Iskandariah, the then-Yang di-Pertuan Agong and then-Raja Permaisuri Agong of Malaysia at Istana Kelantan in Jalan Wickham, Kuala Lumpur. Also in December she welcomed and met with Sultanah Nur Zahirah of Terengganu at Istana Kelantan in Jalan Wickham, Kuala Lumpur.

On 8 March 2024, she participated in a 3-kilometre walk called the "2024 Srikandi Fun Walk" in Kota Bharu, in which Kelantan citizens also participated with her. On 25 March 2024, Sultanah Nur Diana Petra presented SSPN savings account donation awards to 50 Kelantanese students at Perdana Hotel, Kota Bharu. The grant will benefit 300 students in Kelantan State. On 1 April 2024, The Sultanah was in Jeli, Kelantan to attend the 2024 Endowment Ceremony in which she delivered a personal contribution to some ASNAF people of the Kelantan State. On 22 April 2024, she visited KB Permai Silvercraft in Kota Bharu. On 23 April 2024, the Sultanah visited the Cik Minah Songket structure, in Kota Bharu. This establishment is famous for the creation of Kelantan traditional songs. In the structure, the Sultanah also visited the exhibition hall. On 24 April 2024, she attended the 2024 Hi-Tea Ceremony Generasiku Sayang at Perdana Hotel, in Kota Bharu. She spoke to the guests after the ceremony. In September 2024, the Sultanah accompanied her husband at the investiture ceremony in conjunction with the Sultan's 55th birthday celebrations in Kota Bharu. In October 2024, she and her husband received Prime Minister Anwar Ibrahim and wife Wan Azizah Wan Ismail at the Kubang Kerian State Palace. Also in October 2024, the Sultanah traveled to Thailand to attend the "Islamic Fashion Festival" at the Mandarin Oriental Hotel in Bangkok under the patronage of Tunku Azizah Aminah Maimunah Iskandariah, Tengku Ampuan of Pahang: during the event, which also saw a fashion show by famous designers from Malaysia and Indonesia, she also met Queen Suthida of Thailand.

On 27 March 2025, the Sultanah attended the Grand Iftar Nur Kasih Ceremony with the Asnaf and Orphans organized by the Zainab Secondary School Alumni Association (SEMENZA) at Perdana Hotel in Kota Bharu: during the ceremony, she also presented the gifts to 6 representatives of the Asnaf and Orphanage groups. On 12 April 2025, the Sultanah was in Tumpat, Kelantan to attend the 2025 Endowment Ceremony in which she delivered a personal contribution to 30 ASNAF people of Tumpat District. On 13 April 2025, she attended the wedding celebrations of the son of the Tengku Temenggong of Kelantan Tengku Mohamad Rizam, Tengku Yahya Aziz Petra, to Zayana Zaikariah at the Shangri-La Hotel in Kuala Lumpur. On 21 April 2025, the Sultanah accompanied her husband at the opening ceremony of the Third Term of the 15th Kelantan State Legislative Assembly at the Kota Darulnaim Complex in Kota Bharu. On 18 May 2025, she received in audience students Nik Mohamed Firdaus Putra and Nur Syafawati Damia from Kelantan who brought glory to the country by winning the 'International Folklore & Music Competition' held in Prague, Czech Republic in 2024. On 20 May 2025, the Sultanah attended the Dinner Ceremony in conjunction with the Girl Guides Conference and the 60th Annual General Meeting of the Girl Guides Association of Malaysia (PPPM) at Istana Balai Besar in Kota Bharu. This dinner was to honour Raja Zarith Sofiah, Queen of Malaysia's visit to the state of Kelantan as the guest of honour at the annual conference which brought together women leaders from across the country. On 21 May 2025, she attended the 60th conference and annual general meeting of the Girl Guides Association of Malaysia (PPPM) at the Tok Guru Dato’ Bentara Setia hall, Kota Darulnaim Complex in Kota Bharu. On 31 May 2025, the Sultanah attended the wedding celebrations of the son of the President of Pertubuhan Kerabat D’Raja Kelantan (PKDK) Tengku Ramizan, Ahmad Syafiq, to Nur Afifah Qairunnissa at the Glass Hall in Kota Bharu. On 18 June 2025, the Sultanah traveled to the United Kingdom to attend the 2nd day of the Royal Ascot at Ascot Racecourse in Ascot, Berkshire, and for the occasion, she met Prince Edward, Duke of Edinburgh and Sophie, Duchess of Edinburgh. On 20 July 2025, the Sultanah alongside Tunku Azizah Aminah Maimunah Iskandariah, Tengku Ampuan of Pahang attended a Charity Dinner in conjunction with The Kuala Lumpur Men's Fashion Week (TKLMFW) 2025 at the M Resort Hotel in Kuala Lumpur. On 8 August 2025, she received in audience a delegation from the National Registration Department of Malaysia (NRD) at Istana Kelantan in Jalan Wickham, Kuala Lumpur. On 6 September 2025, the Sultanah attended the Opening Ceremony of the Festival Cita Rasa Warisan @ Pantai Timur Kelantan 2025 at the Sultan Muhammad IV Stadium Grounds, Kota Bharu. On 7 September 2025, she attended the Seri Puteri Warisan Dinner at Perdana Hotel, Kota Bharu. On 29 September 2025, the Sultanah accompanied her husband at the Parade Inspection Ceremony and the Investiture Ceremony in conjunction with the Sultan's 56th birthday celebrations in Kota Bharu. Additionally, on 29 September 2025, the Sultanah received in audience H.E. Mr. Juraj Koudelka, the Ambassador of the Czech Republic to Malaysia at the Kubang Kerian State Palace. She and her husband also attended a dinner presented by the Kelantan State Government at the Kompleks Kota Darul Naim in Kota Bharu. On 1 October 2025, the Sultanah and her husband attended the Garden Party (a Ruler with the People Ceremony) at the Dataran Warisan Sultan Muhammad IV Stadium in Kota Bharu. On 2 October 2025, she attended the "2025 Kelantan Flora Festival" at the Tengku Anis Municipal Park in Kota Bharu. On 4 October 2025, the Sultanah and her husband attended the decorated float parade at the Sultan Muhammad IV Stadium in Kota Bharu. On 11 October 2025, she and her husband attended the Majlis Orang-orang Besar Diraja Kelantan Dinner Presentation, one of the celebrations for the Sultan's birthday, at the Shangri-La Hotel in Kuala Lumpur. On 12 October 2025, the Sultanah and her husband attended the Justice of Peace Dinner Presentation, another celebration for the Sultan's birthday, at the Shangri-La Hotel in Kuala Lumpur. On 13 October 2025, she and her husband attended the Kelantan State Administrative Officers Association Dinner Presentation, also part of the Sultan's birthday celebrations, at the Shangri-La Hotel in Kuala Lumpur. On 5 November 2025, the Sultanah and her husband attended The Reception On The Occasion Of The National Day And The Armed Forces Day Of The Czech Republic at The Ritz-Carlton, Kuala Lumpur. On 7 November 2025, the Sultanah was in Gua Musang, Kelantan to attend the Sultan of Kelantan Foundation Endowment Ceremony in which she delivered a contribution to 30 ASNAF people of Gua Musang District. On 11 November 2025, she attended the grand reopening of the Mouawad Boutique in Dubai Mall. On 24 November 2025, the Sultanah alongside Tunku Azizah Aminah Maimunah Iskandariah, Tengku Ampuan of Pahang attended the Islamic Fashion Festival (IFF) 2025 - Royal Charity Gala Dinner at the Mandarin Oriental Hotel in Kuala Lumpur. On 12 December 2025, she received in audience Saifuddin Nasution Ismail, the Minister of Home Affairs at Istana Kelantan in Jalan Wickham, Kuala Lumpur.

On 14 February 2026, the Sultanah and her husband participated in the 'Walkathon D'Raja Walk With Me 2026' at the Sultan Muhammad IV Stadium, Kota Bharu. On 15 February 2026, she attended the Endowment Ceremony to the poor and the disabled at the Kompleks Islam Jubli Perak Sultan Ismail Petra, Panji, Kota Bharu.

== Social contribution ==
Sultanah Nur Diana Petra Abdullah is also the royal patron for various organisations and charities in the state of Kelantan. The organisation under her consists of:

- Girl Guides Association of Kelantan.
- Kelantan Women's Institute (WI).

== Eponym ==
In October 2024, a variety of orchids present at the 2024 Kelantan Flora Festival and one hybrid orchid were named in her honor, with the name of "Orchid Vandachostylis Sultanah Nur Diana Petra", granted by the Royal Horticultural Society, based in the United Kingdom.

== Titles and styles ==
Styles of Sultanah Nur Diana Petra Abdullah
- Reference style: Her Royal Highness
- Spoken style: Your Royal Highness
- Alternative style: Tuanku

- Since 2 August 2022: Her Royal Highness Sultanah Nur Diana Petra Abdullah, Sultanah of Kelantan

As a commoner who became queen consort to a reigning Sultan of Kelantan, she was conferred the title Sultanah of Kelantan by her husband Sultan Muhammad V on 2 August 2022.

== Honours ==
- Kelantan
  - Recipient of the Royal Family Order of Kelantan (DK) (2022)
  - Knight Grand Commander of the Order of the Crown of Kelantan (SPMK) – Dato' (2022)

Malaysian royalty
Preceded by Tengku Anis (as Raja Perempuan)	Consort of the Sultan of Kelantan; Sultanah; 2022–present	Incumbent
