= Tengku Muhammad Fakhry Petra =

Crown Prince of Kelantan (born 1978)

Tengku Muhammad Fakhry Petra تڠكو محمد فخري ڤيترا
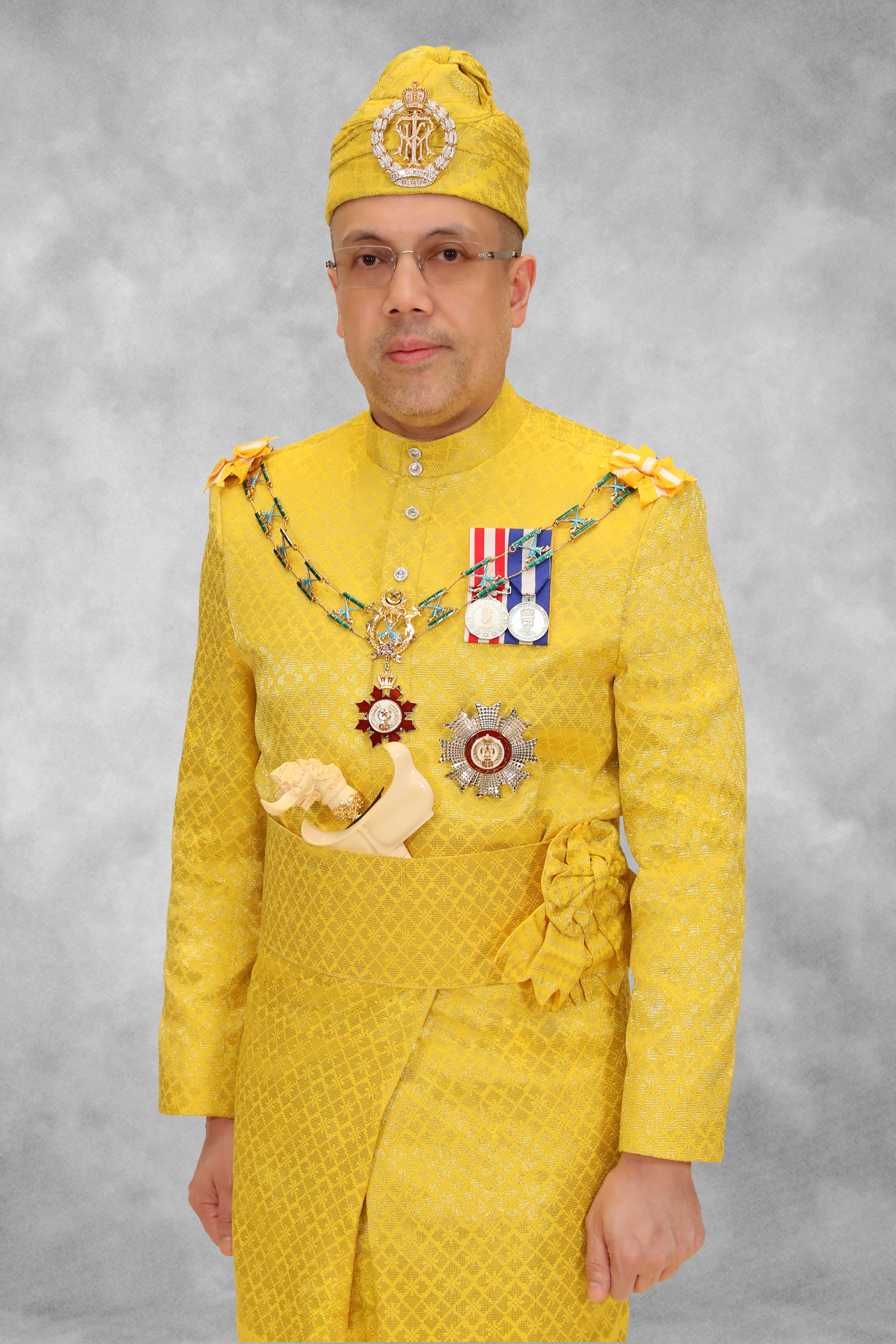

Tengku Mahkota of Kelantan
- Tenure: 4 January 2024 – present
- Predecessor: Tengku Muhammad Fa-iz Petra
- Born: Tengku Muhammad Fakhry Petra bin Tengku Ismail Petra; 7 April 1978 (age 48); Kota Bharu, Kelantan, Malaysia
- Spouse: Manohara Odelia Pinot (m. 2008; div. 2009)
Names
- Tengku Muhammad Fakhry Petra ibni Almarhum Sultan Ismail Petra
- House: Long Yunus
- Father: Sultan Ismail Petra Ibni Almarhum Sultan Yahya Petra
- Mother: Tengku Anis Binti Almarhum Tengku Abdul Hamid
- Religion: Sunni Islam

Tengku Muhammad Fakhry Petra ibni Almarhum Sultan Ismail Petra (Jawi: تڠكو محمد فخري ڤيترا ابن المرحوم سلطان إسماعيل ڤيترا; born 7 April 1978) is the current Tengku Mahkota (Crown Prince) of Kelantan. He is a younger brother of the current Sultan of Kelantan, Sultan Muhammad V.

== Early life and education ==
Tengku Fakhry was born in Kota Bharu, Kelantan on 7 April 1978 as the third of four children of the 28th Sultan of Kelantan, Sultan Ismail Petra and Raja Perempuan Tengku Anis. His two elder brothers are Sultan Muhammad V, the current Sultan of Kelantan and the 15th Yang di-Pertuan Agong of Malaysia, and Tengku Muhammad Faiz Petra, the former Tengku Mahkota of Kelantan. His younger sister is Tengku Amalin A’ishah Putri, the Tengku Maharani Putri.

Tengku Fakhry began his early education at Sultan Ismail Primary School (1) in Kota Bharu, Kelantan. He continued his studies at the United World College in Singapore and then studied A-Levels at Hurtwood House in England. He graduated with a Bachelor's degree in Finance from the University of Westminster, London.

== Personal life ==
Tengku Fakhry married Manohara Odelia Pinot, an Indonesian model, on 26 August 2008 in Kota Bharu, Kelantan. At the time of their marriage, Tengku Fakhry was 30 years old, while Manohara was 16. They met in December 2006 at a dinner attended by the Deputy Prime Minister of Malaysia at that time, Najib Razak in Jakarta, Indonesia, when Manohara was only 14, then only half the age of Tengku Fakhry. Manohara filed for divorce in May 2009, alleging that she had endured physical and mental abuse from her husband. Tengku Fakhry denied these claims, and his lawyer alleged that she was acting "out of spite" and "motivated by a desire of financial gains". The following year, Malaysia's high court awarded Tengku Fakhry RM6 million in damages after he filed a defamation suit over allegations of abuse against Manohara and her mother Daisy Fajarina. The scandal received widespread media attention.

== Royal titles ==
Tengku Fakhry was previously conferred the title of Tengku Temenggong of Kelantan in March 1997 by his father, Sultan Ismail Petra; however, he was stripped of his title by his brother, Sultan Muhammad V, in September 2010. In March 2022, Tengku Fakhry was bestowed the title of Tengku Bendahara of Kelantan by Sultan Muhammad V. In January 2024, he was proclaimed Tengku Mahkota of Kelantan by the Kelantan Royal Succession Council. Between late March and late May 2026, Tengku Fakhry served as the Regent of Kelantan.

== Royal duties ==
On 5 May 2025, Tengku Fakhry was proclaimed as the Pro Chancellor of Universiti Malaysia Kelantan (UMK) at the university's 14th convocation at Dewan Tuanku Canselor, UMK Bachok, Kelantan.

Tengku Fakhry was sworn in as Chairman of the Kelantan State Service Commission (SPN) at Istana Kota Lama, Kota Bharu, Kelantan, on 29 March 2026.

On 22 June 2026, he was conferred the rank of Brigadier General (Honorary) as the Patron of the Territorial Army Support Committee (JAKPAW) for Kelantan at Wisma Pertahanan, Kuala Lumpur.

== Titles and styles ==
Styles of Tengku Muhammad Fakhry Petra
- Reference style: His Highness
- Spoken style: Your Highness
- Alternative style: Tuanku

The full title and style of Tengku Muhammad Fakhry Petra :

His Highness Tengku Muhammad Fakhry Petra ibni Almarhum Sultan Ismail Petra, D.K., S.P.M.K., Tengku Mahkota of Kelantan

== Honours ==
=== Honours of Kelantan ===
- Recipient of the Royal Family Order of Kelantan (DK) (2003, revoked in 2010 and reinstated 2019)
- Knight Grand Commander of the Order of the Crown of Kelantan (SPMK) – Dato' (revoked in 2010 and reinstated 2025)
- Recipient of the Sultan Ismail Petra Silver Jubilee Medal (30 March 2004)
- Recipient of the Sultan Muhammad V Proclamation Medal (13 September 2010)

=== Honours of Malaysia ===
- Recipient of the 17th Yang di-Pertuan Agong Installation Medal (20 July 2024)

Note: ^{*} The DK and SPMK awards were rescinded in 2010. However, they were subsequently reinstated in 2019 and 2025, respectively.
