= Royal Family Order of Kelantan =

Honorific order of the Sultanate of Kelantan

Royal Family Order of Kelantan Darjah Kerabat Yang Amat Di-Hormati Kelantan

Awarded by Sultan of Kelantan
- Type: Order
- Founded: 9 August 1916
- Status: Currently constituted
- Sovereign: Sultan Muhammad V
- Grades: Star of Yunus (DK)

Precedence
- Next (higher): None
- Next (lower): Order of the Crown of Kelantan
- Ribbon bar of the order

The Most Esteemed Royal Family Order of Kelantan or the Star of Yunus (Malay: Darjah Kerabat Yang Amat Di-Hormati or Bintang Al-Yunusi) is an honorific order of the Sultanate of Kelantan.

== History ==
Instituted on 9 August 1916, this order is conferred on members of the Kelantan royal family and members of other royal families in Malaysia. It is also presented to individuals in high positions who have contributed significantly to the State.

== Classes ==
The order is awarded in a single class, Star of Yunus or Bintang al-Yunusi (DK). The maximum number of recipients at one time is 25 living persons, but there are no limits for honorary recipients of the order.

== Notable recipients ==
- Ibrahim of Kelantan
- Nik Ahmad Kamil Nik Mahmud
- Abdul Razak Hussein
- Raja Perempuan Tengku Anis
- Raja Perempuan Zainab II
- Yahya Petra of Kelantan (1939)
- Hassanal Bolkiah of Brunei (1968)
- Ismail Petra of Kelantan (1968)
- Tengku Abdul Aziz (1968, revoked 2014, reinstated 2018)
- Abdul Halim of Kedah (1969)
- Tunku Abdul Rahman (1970)
- Tengku Razaleigh Hamzah (1978, revoked 2010, reinstated 2018)
- Mahmud of Terengganu (1985)
- Muhammad V of Kelantan (1986)
- Queen Saleha of Brunei (1999)
- Pengiran Isteri Mariam (1999)
- Queen Sirikit (2000)
- Mahathir Mohamad (2002)
- Sharafuddin of Selangor (2002)
- Sirajuddin of Perlis (2002)
- Mizan Zainal Abidin of Terengganu (2002)
- Tengku Muhammad Fa-iz Petra (2003)
- Tengku Muhammad Fakhry Petra (2003, revoked 2010, reinstated 2019)
- Tuanku Tengku Fauziah (2004)
- Vajiralongkorn (2004)
- Abdullah Ahmad Badawi (2006)
- Tengku Amalin A’ishah Putri (2006)
- Muhriz of Negeri Sembilan (2010)
- Ibrahim Ismail of Johor (2010)
- Nazrin Shah of Perak (2015)
- Tengku Mohamad Rizam (2017)
- Sallehuddin of Kedah (2017)
- Sultanah Nur Diana Petra Abdullah (2022)
- Prince Mohamed Bolkiah (2022)
- Abdullah of Pahang (2023)

== See also ==
- Orders, decorations, and medals of the Malaysian states and federal territories
- Orders, decorations, and medals of Kelantan
- List of post-nominal letters (Kelantan)
