= Tengku Zubaidah Tengku Norudin =

Former Tengku Ampuan Mahkota of Kelantan

Tengku Zubaidah تڠکو زبيدة

Tengku Ampuan Mahkota of Kelantan
- Tenure: 15 November 2004 – 2008
- Predecessor: Tengku Anis binti Almarhum Tengku Abdul Hamid (as Tengku Ampuan Mahkota)
- Successor: Che Puan Sofie Louise Johansson Petra (as Che Puan Mahkota)
- Born: Kangsadal Pipitpakdee; 1979 (age 46–47); Jering Royal Palace, Pattani, Thailand
- Spouse: Tengku Muhammad Faris Petra (later Sultan Muhammad V) (m. 2004; div. 2008)
- House: Sultanate of Patani
- Father: Wairot Phiphitphakdee (Tengku Norudin bin Tengku Muda)
- Mother: Yaowalak Phiphiphakdi (Cik Jamilah binti Cik Abdullah)
- Religion: Sunni Islam

Tengku Zubaidah binti Tengku Norudin (Jawi: تڠکو زبيدة بنت تڠکو نورالدين; née Kangsadal Pipitpakdee (Thai: กังสดาล พิพิธภักดี)) is a Thai woman of Malay descent and member of Pattani royal family. She is the former wife of Sultan Muhammad V (then Tengku Muhammad Faris Petra), the 29th Sultan of Kelantan.

== Early life ==
Tengku Zubaidah is the third child of Wairot Phiphitphakdi (Tengku Norudin bin Tengku Muda) and Yaowalak Phiphitphakdi (Cik Jamilah binti Cik Abdullah). Her father, Wairot was a former Thai politician from the Thai Rak Thai Party and a member of Parliament for Pattani for five terms. She was born in 1979 at the Jering Royal Palace, Pattani, Thailand.

Tengku Zubaidah's family is a descendant of the royal family of Pattani who once led Pattani before it was conquered by Thailand in 1902. Her father, Wairot was the son of Phra Phiphitphakdi (Tengku Muda Abdul Putra) and his third wife, Sawas (formerly Darachat), who was a Thai citizen of Chinese descent from Bangkok.

Tengku Zubaidah is the cousin of Raja Perempuan Tengku Anis, the mother of Sultan Muhammad V. Her father, Wairot is a half-brother of Raja Perempuan Tengku Anis's father, Tengku Abdul Hamid bin Tengku Muda Abdul Putra.

== Education ==
Tengku Zubaidah studied at the Demonstration School of Prince of Songkla University, Pattani and obtained a Bachelor’s Degree of Science from Mahidol University, Bangkok in 2003.

== Personal life ==
On 15 November 2004, Tengku Zubaidah married Tengku Muhammad Faris Petra (now Sultan Muhammad V), the eldest son of Sultan Ismail Petra and Raja Perempuan Tengku Anis. After their marriage, her official title became Yang Teramat Mulia (Her Highness) Tengku Zubaidah binti Tengku Norudin, the Tengku Ampuan Mahkota (Crown Princess) of Kelantan. The marriage ended in divorce in 2008.
