= House of Long Yunus =

Family consisting of the close relatives of the monarch of Kelantan

House of Long Yunus Kelantan royal family
- Royal house
- Parent family: House of Jembal
- Country: Malaysia
- Current region: Kelantan
- Origin: Kelantan, Malaya
- Founded: 1763; 263 years ago
- Founder: Long Yunus
- Current head: Muhammad V of Kelantan
- Seat: Istana Negeri Kubang Kerian
- Historic seat: Istana Balai Besar; Istana Kota Lama

The House of Long Yunus is the ruling house of the Malaysian state of Kelantan. The state is currently led by Sultan Muhammad V.

== History ==
Following the power struggle which resulted in the murder of his father Long Sulaiman in 1756, Long Yunus fled to the neighboring Terengganu Sultanate, placing himself under the protection of its powerful ruler, Mansur Shah I. In 1763, Sultan Mansur launched first of a series of attack against Kelantan, successfully brought his protege Long Yunus to the throne of Kelantan 11 years later. Until the end of the 18th century, Kelantan remained under the overlordship of Terengganu. In spite of this, Long Yunus is regarded as the founder of the modern state of Kelantan, as he was credited for unifying the state and successfully brought all the warring chiefs under his control.

== Roles ==
Several members of the royal family are also the members of the State Royal Succession Council (Malay: Majlis Perajaan Negeri) or the Advisory Council to the Ruler (Malay: Majlis Penasihat Raja). The State Royal Succession Council role is to confirm the ascension to the throne while the Advisory Council to the Ruler role is to assist the Sultan in carrying out his duty to the state by acting as an advisory body to the Sultan. Some members are made Kerabat D’Raja Bergelar or in English, royal family members with titles, whom are responsible for any engagement involving the palace.

== Titles and styles ==
The full title of the Sultan of Kelantan is Sultan dan Yang di-Pertuan bagi Negeri Kelantan Darul Naim serta Jajahan Takluknya, or in English, The Sultan and Sovereign Ruler of Kelantan Abode of Bliss and its Dependencies.

The title Raja Perempuan Kelantan may be conferred to a spouse of the Sultan, given that she is of a royal descent. The title Sultanah Kelantan can be conferred instead to the spouse that is not of a royal descent. The regnal name of the consort of the Sultan will be the title, followed by her given name. For example: Sultanah Nur Diana Petra Abdullah.

The heir apparent is conferred the title Tengku Mahkota Kelantan or in English, the Crown Prince of Kelantan. His wife will receive the title Tengku Ampuan Mahkota Kelantan if she is of royal descent. The title Che Puan Mahkota Kelantan can be conferred instead to the wife that is not of royal descent.

The Sultan's mother will receive the title and honorific prefix of Raja Perempuan before her given name upon his ascension to the throne. For example, Muhammad V of Kelantan's mother is styled Raja Perempuan Tengku Anis binti Almarhum Tengku Abdul Hamid.

Family members that were given titles are called Kerabat Diraja Bergelar, which literally means "royal family members with titles". The spouses of Kerabat Diraja Bergelar will carry titles that complemented their husbands' titles. For example, the wife of Tengku Temenggong Kelantan is styled Tengku Puan Temenggong Kelantan if she is of royal descent. The title Che Puan Temenggong Kelantan can be conferred instead to the wife that is not of royal descent.

== Members ==
As of 2026, the members are:

=== Immediate family ===
- Sultan Muhammad V of Kelantan (b. 1969) and Sultanah Nur Diana Petra, the Sultanah of Kelantan (b. 1988)
  (the Sultan and his wife)
  - Tengku Ismail Leon Petra (b. 2019)
    (the Sultan's son by Oksana Voevodina)
- Raja Perempuan Tengku Anis (b. 1949)
  (the Sultan's mother)
  - Tengku Muhammad Fa-iz Petra (b. 1974) and Che Puan Sofie Louise Johansson Petra (b. 1986)
    (the Sultan's brother and sister-in-law)
    - Tengku Muhammad Johan Petra (b. 2023)
      (the Sultan's nephew)
  - Tengku Muhammad Fakhry Petra, the Tengku Mahkota of Kelantan (b. 1978)
    (the Sultan's brother)
  - Tengku Amalin A’ishah Putri, the Tengku Maharani Putri (b. 1984) and Pengiran Muda Abdul Qawi, the Tengku Sri Utama Raja (b. 1974)
    (the Sultan's sister and brother-in-law)
    - Pengiran Anak Tengku Afeefah Musyafaah Bolkiah Putri (b. 2014)
      (the Sultan's niece)
    - Pengiran Anak Tengku Azzahra Iffatul Bolkiah Putri (b. 2016)
      (the Sultan's niece)
    - Pengiran Anak Tengku Zaafirah Muizzah Bolkiah Putri (b. 2020)
      (the Sultan's niece)
    - Pengiran Anak Tengku Abdul Muhaimin Bolkiah Petra (b. 2022)
      (the Sultan's nephew)

=== Extended family ===
(Descendants of Sultan Yahya Petra (1917–1979) and Raja Perempuan Zainab II (1917–1993)):

- Tengku Merjan binti Almarhum Sultan Yahya Petra (1940–2020) and Tengku Abdul Aziz bin Tengku Mohd Hamzah (1933–2020)
  (the Sultan's aunt and uncle-in-law)
  - Tengku Tan Sri Dato' Haji Mohamad Rizam bin Tengku Abdul Aziz, the Tengku Temenggong of Kelantan (b. 1961) and Tunku Puan Sri Dato' Hajah Noor Hayati binti Tunku Abdul Rahman Putra Al-Haj, the Tengku Puan Temenggong of Kelantan (b. 1967)
    (the Sultan's first cousin and cousin-in-law)
    - Tengku Nur Qistina Petri (b. 1992)
      (the Sultan's first cousin once removed)
    - Tengku Abdul Rahman Petra (b. 1994) and Cik Miera Leydia binti Dato' Sri Kasmi
      (the Sultan's first cousin once removed and cousin-in-law once removed)
    - Tengku Yahya Aziz Petra (b. 1998) and Cik Zayana binti Zaikariah
      (the Sultan's first cousin once removed and cousin-in-law once removed)
  - Dato' Tengku Ramizan binti Tengku Abdul Aziz (b. 1963) and Dato' Dr. Ahmad Barhanudin bin Dato' Haji Mohamed
    (the Sultan's first cousin and first cousin-in-law)
  - Tengku Mohamed Rizal bin Tengku Abdul Aziz (b. 1965) and Puan Julia binti Dato' Hashim
    (the Sultan's first cousin and first cousin-in-law)
  - Datuk Tengku Mohamad Ridzman bin Tengku Abdul Aziz (b. 1967)
    (the Sultan's first cousin)
- Dato' Tengku Rozan binti Almarhum Sultan Yahya Petra (1942–2026) and Dato' Saharudin bin Samsudin (b. 1950)
  (the Sultan's aunt and uncle-in-law)
  - Dato' Tengku Rozanna Petri binti Tengku Mohamed Nasrun (b. 1970) and Dato' Azahar bin Mohd Shariff
    (the Sultan's first cousin and first cousin-in-law)
  - Dato' Tengku Rozlynda Petri binti Tengku Mohamed Nasrun (b. 1973) and Rizal lL-Ehzan bin Fadil Azim
    (the Sultan's first cousin and first cousin-in-law)
- Dato' Tengku Salwani binti Almarhum Sultan Yahya Petra (1944–2026)
  (the Sultan's aunt)
  - Dato' Sri Raja Shah Zurin bin Raja Aman Shah, the Tengku Sri Kelana D'Raja (b. 1961)
    (the Sultan's first cousin)
  - Raja Amir Saifuddin Shah bin Raja Aman Shah (b. 1968)
    (the Sultan's first cousin)
- Tengku Rohani binti Almarhum Sultan Yahya Petra (1947-2021)
  (the Sultan's aunt)

(Descendants of Sultan Yahya Petra (1917–1979) and Tengku Alexandria binti Tengku Yusof):

- Tengku Mohamed ibni Almarhum Sultan Yahya Petra (1967–2025)
  (the Sultan's uncle)
- Tengku Maziah binti Almarhum Sultan Yahya Petra and Azman bin Ismail
  (the Sultan's aunt and uncle-in-law)
- Tengku Zubaidah binti Almarhum Sultan Yahya Petra and Nordin bin Talib
  (the Sultan's aunt and uncle-in-law)

(Descendants of Sultan Ibrahim (1897–1960) and Raja Perempuan Zainab I (1897-1985)):

- Tengku Petra ibni Almarhum Sultan Ibrahim
  (the Sultan's granduncle)
- Tengku Indra Petra ibni Almarhum Sultan Ibrahim (1916–1983) and Zainab binti Ali
  (the Sultan's granduncle and grandaunt-in-law)
  - Tengku Elani binti Tengku Indra Petra
    (the Sultan's first cousin once removed)
  - Dato' Tengku Ibrahim Petra bin Tengku Indra Petra (b. 1955) and Datin Nariza Hajjar Hashim (b. 1961)
    (the Sultan's first cousin once removed and cousin-in-law once removed)
  - Tengku Ishan Petra bin Tengku Indra Petra
    (the Sultan's first cousin once removed)
  - Tengku Imran Petra bin Tengku Indra Petra
    (the Sultan's first cousin once removed)
  - Tengku Idris Petra bin Tengku Indra Petra
    (the Sultan's first cousin once removed)
  - Tengku Ikram Petra bin Tengku Indra Petra
    (the Sultan's first cousin once removed)
- Tengku Thuraya binti Almarhum Sultan Ibrahim (1928–2021) and Tengku Azman Shah Al-Haj ibni Almarhum Sultan Hisamuddin Alam Shah Al-Haj (1931–2014)
  (the Sultan's grandaunt and granduncle-in-law)
  - Tengku Dato' Setia Putra Al-Haj bin Tengku Azman Shah, the Tengku Indera Pahlawan Diraja of Selangor and Pengiran Hajah Zaliha of Brunei (the Sultan's first cousin once removed and cousin-in-law once removed)
    - Tengku Saidatul Rehan (the Sultan's second cousin)
    - Tengku Saifan Rafhan, the Tengku Maha Kurnia Bijaya Diraja of Selangor (the Sultan's second cousin)
    - Tengku Ainul Nur Syuhada (the Sultan's second cousin)
  - Tengku Nazri bin Tengku Azman Shah (the Sultan's first cousin once removed)
  - Tengku Puteri Insani binti Tengku Azman Shah (the Sultan's first cousin once removed)
  - Tengku Dato' Shamsulbhari bin Tengku Azman Shah and Datin Tengku Zubaidah binti Tengku Mohammad (the Sultan's first cousin once removed and cousin-in-law once removed)
  - Tengku Dato' Hishamuddin Zaizi bin Tengku Azman Shah and Datin Hezeita binti Muhammad Hafidz (the Sultan's first cousin once removed and cousin-in-law once removed)
  - Tengku Puteri Saidatul Aini binti Tengku Azman Shah (the Sultan's first cousin once removed)

(Descendants of Sultan Ibrahim (1897–1960) and Tengku Yah):

- Tengku Mariam binti Almarhum Sultan Ibrahim
  (the Sultan's granduaunt)
- Tengku Petri binti Almarhum Sultan Ibrahim and Tengku Abdul Rashid ibni Almarhun Sultan Sulaiman Badrul Alam Shah
  (the Sultan's grandaunt and granduncle-in-law)
  - Tengku Ahmad Petra bin Tengku Abdul Rashid
    (the Sultan's first cousin once removed)
  - Tuanku Tengku Fauziah binti Almarhum Tengku Abdul Rashid, the Raja Perempuan of Perlis
    (the Sultan's first cousin once removed)
  - Tengku Zaida binti Tengku Abdul Rashid
    (the Sultan's first cousin once removed)

(Descendants of Sultan Ibrahim (1897–1960) and Cik Puan Besar Embong):

- Tengku Wok binti Almarhum Sultan Ibrahim
  (the Sultan's grandaunt)
- Tengku Nurulaini binti Almarhum Sultan Ibrahim and Tengku Abdul Khalid ibni Almarhum Sultan Abdullah Al-Muhtasim Billah Shah
  (the Sultan's grandaunt and granduncle-in-law)
  - Tengku Ahmad Bashiruddin bin Tengku Abdul Khalid
    (the Sultan's first cousin once removed)
- Tengku Zainal Mulok ibni Almarhum Sultan Ibrahim
  (the Sultan's granduncle)
  - Tengku Hanasiah binti Tengku Zainal Mulok
    (the Sultan's first cousin once removed)
  - Tengku Roziah binti Tengku Zainal Mulok
    (the Sultan's first cousin once removed)
  - Tengku Naziah binti Tengku Zainal Mulok
    (the Sultan's first cousin once removed)
  - Dato' Tengku Adida binti Tengku Zainal Mulok
    (the Sultan's first cousin once removed)
  - Tengku Elida binti Tengku Zainal Mulok
    (the Sultan's first cousin once removed)
- Tengku Iskandar Shah ibni Almarhum Sultan Ibrahim
  (the Sultan's granduncle)
- Tengku Mastura binti Almarhum Sultan Ibrahim
  (the Sultan's grandaunt)

(Descendants of Sultan Ibrahim (1897–1960) and Cik Siti):

- Tengku Feissal ibni Almarhum Sultan Ibrahim and Nik Sharifah binti Haji Nik Jaafar
  (the Sultan's granduncle and grandaunt-in-law)
  - Dato' Dr. Tengku Mohamed Faziharudean Al-Haj bin Tengku Feissal, the Tengku Kaya Perkasa (b. 1966)
    (the Sultan's first cousin once removed)
  - Tengku Faireen Sadira binti Tengku Feissal (b. 1970)
    (the Sultan's first cousin once removed)
  - Dato' Tengku Ainura binti Tengku Feissal (b. 1973)
    (the Sultan's first cousin once removed)
  - Dato' Tengku Ibrahim Farihaddin bin Tengku Feissal (b. 1975)
    (the Sultan's first cousin once removed)
  - Tengku Farini Amalina binti Tengku Feissal
    (the Sultan's first cousin once removed)
  - Tengku Farah Aliza binti Tengku Feissal
    (the Sultan's first cousin once removed)
  - Tengku Ismail Fadhil bin Tengku Feissal (b. 1980)
    (the Sultan's first cousin once removed)
- Tengku Faridah binti Almarhum Sultan Ibrahim (b. 1939) and Dato' Captain Khairi bin Mohamad (b. 1940)
  (the Sultan's grandaunt and granduncle-in-law)
  - Dato' Captain Tengku Ahmad Farizanudean bin Tengku Ibrahim (b. 1962) and Dato' Norasni binti Ayob (b. 1962)
    (the Sultan's first cousin once removed and cousin-in-law once removed)
    - Tengku Ahmad Farhan Putra bin Tengku Ahmad Farizanudean and Nik Alya Aisya Sapeia binti Dato' Haji Nik Raisnan (the Sultan's second cousin and cousin-in-law)
    - Tengku Farisa binti Tengku Ahmad Farizanudean (the Sultan's second cousin)
- Tengku Rashida binti Almarhum Sultan Ibrahim
  (the Sultan's grandaunt)
- Tengku Badrol Alam ibni Almarhum Sultan Ibrahim
  (the Sultan's granduncle)
- Tengku Anis binti Almarhum Sultan Ibrahim
  (the Sultan's grandaunt)

(Descendants of Sultan Ibrahim (1897–1960) and Cik Safiah):

- Tengku Abdul Halim Al-Haj ibni Almarhum Sultan Ibrahim, the Tengku Laksamana of Kelantan (b. 1943) and Dato' Seri Diraja Sharifah Azwan binti Almarhum Tuanku Syed Putra Jamalullail, the Tengku Puan Laksamana of Kelantan (b. 1947)
  (the Sultan's granduncle and grandaunt-in-law)
  - Dato' Paduka Tengku Ariez Hazaril (b. 1971) and Datin Paduka Tunku Dayang Adelene Bahjah binti Tan Sri Abang Abu Bakar (b. 1975)
    (the Sultan's first cousin once removed and cousin-in-law once removed)
    - Tengku Adrei bin Tengku Ariez Hazaril
    - Tengku Dayang Adeira binti Tengku Ariez Hazaril
  - Tengku Adyl Hazraque and Cik Shirena binti Hamzah
    (the Sultan's first cousin once removed and cousin-in-law once removed)
  - Tengku To' Puan Aressa Helanie and Dato' Syed Budriz Putra Jamalullail bin Syed Amir Abidin Jamalullail, the Engku Maharaja Lela Setia Paduka of Selangor (b. 1972)
    (the Sultan's first cousin once removed and cousin-in-law once removed)
    - Syed Aqil Harryth Jamalullail (the Sultan's second cousin)
    - Sharifah Allyssa Hanis (the Sultan's second cousin)
- Tengku Faridah Hanim binti Almarhum Sultan Ibrahim
  (the Sultan's granduaunt)
- Tengku Fatihah binti Almarhum Sultan Ibrahim and Dato' Haji Muhammad Arif bin Abu Bakar
  (the Sultan's grandaunt and granduncle-in-law)
- Tengku Rostam ibni Almarhum Sultan Ibrahim
  (the Sultan's granduncle)
- Tengku Shibli Shah ibni Almarhum Sultan Ibrahim
  (the Sultan's granduncle)

(Descendants of Sultan Ibrahim (1897–1960) and Cik Habibah):

- Tengku Nizam ibni Almarhum Sultan Ibrahim
  (the Sultan's granduncle)
- Tengku Aman Shah ibni Almarhum Sultan Ibrahim
  (the Sultan's granduncle)
- Tengku Shahariman ibni Almarhum Sultan Ibrahim
  (the Sultan's granduncle)

(Descendants of Sultan Ismail (1880–1944)):

- Tengku Petri Kisman Ja’ajan binti Almarhum Sultan Ismail and Tengku Ahmad Alham Shah ibni Almarhum Sultan Alaudin Sulaiman Shah (the Sultan's grandaunt and granduncle-in-law)

(Descendants of Sultan Muhammad IV (1870–1920)):

- Tengku Yusoff ibni Almarhum Sultan Muhammad IV (the Sultan's great granduncle)
- Tengku Mahmood ibni Almarhum Sultan Muhammad IV and Mahani binti Abdullah Sabit (the Sultan's great granduncle and great grandaunt-in-law)
  - Tengku Mustapha bin Tengku Mahmood (the Sultan's first cousin twice removed)
    - Tengku Mahisham bin Tengku Mustapha and Izzuny binti Abdul Ghani (the Sultan's second cousin once removed and second cousin once removed-in-law)
    - Tengku Mariena binti Tengku Mustapha (the Sultan's second cousin once removed)
    - Tengku Marinie binti Tengku Mustapha (the Sultan's second cousin once removed)
  - Tengku Alias bin Tengku Mahmood and Rokiah binti Yusuf (the Sultan's first cousin twice removed and first cousin twice removed-in-law)
    - Tengku Harun Al Rashid bin Tengku Alias (the Sultan's second cousin once removed)
    - Tengku Kamaruddin bin Tengku Alias and Wan Rahayu binti Wan Jusoh (the Sultan's second cousin once removed and second cousin once removed-in-law)
    - Tengku Badli Shah bin Tengku Alias and Wan Rafida binti Wan Muhamad (the Sultan's second cousin once removed and second cousin once removed-in-law)
    - Tengku Normila binti Tengku Alias and Muhammad Ezazee bin Muhammad Embong (the Sultan's second cousin once removed and second cousin once removed-in-law)
    - Tengku Normi Suriani binti Tengku Alias and Muhammad Ihsan bin Muhammad Noordin (the Sultan's second cousin once removed and second cousin once removed-in-law)
  - Tengku Noone Aziz bin Tengku Mahmood and Tunku Puteri Munawirah binti Almarhum Tuanku Munawir (the Sultan's first cousin twice removed and first cousin twice removed-in-law)
    - Tengku Mu'adzam Sadruddin bin Tengku Noone Aziz and Anizah binti Baharuddin (the Sultan's second cousin once removed and second cousin once removed-in-law)
    - Tengku Munawir Islahuddin bin Tengku Noone Aziz and Suzie Yanti binti Muhammad Lagis (the Sultan's second cousin once removed and second cousin once removed-in-law)
    - Tengku Mu’amir Izzuddin bin Tengku Noone Aziz and Athiya binti Hamid (the Sultan's second cousin once removed and second cousin once removed-in-law)
  - Tengku Zainal Rashid bin Tengku Mahmood and Zanariah binti Abdullah (the Sultan's first cousin twice removed and first cousin twice removed-in-law)
    - Tengku Zain Rashidean bin Tengku Zainal Rashid (the Sultan's second cousin once removed)
    - Tengku Zurina binti Tengku Zainal Rashid and Mohammad Nageb bin Abdul Majid (the Sultan's second cousin once removed and second cousin once removed-in-law)
  - Tengku Zainal Adlin bin Tengku Mahamood (the Sultan's first cousin twice removed)
    - Tengku Zainal Aldrin bin Tengku Zainal Adlin (the Sultan's second cousin once removed)
    - Tengku Putri Soraya binti Tengku Zainal Adlin and Tunku Mahmud bin Tunku Yahya (the Sultan's second cousin once removed and second cousin once removed-in-law)
    - Tengku Adlina Marita binti Tengku Zainal Adlin and Anuar bin Ayub (the Sultan's second cousin once removed and second cousin once removed-in-law)
    - Tengku Putri Marilyn binti Tengku Zainal Adlin (the Sultan's second cousin once removed)
  - Tengku Zahar bin Tengku Mahmood and Aniza binti Abdullah (the Sultan's first cousin twice removed and first cousin twice removed-in-law)
- Tengku Muhammad ibni Almarhum Sultan Muhammad IV and Tuan Sharifa Zainab binti Sayyid Ahmad (the Sultan's great granduncle and great grandaunt-in-law)
  - Tengku Zainimah binti Tengku Muhammad and Sayyid Noh bin Sayyid Omar (the Sultan's first cousin twice removed and first cousin twice removed-in-law)
  - Tengku Noor Mariam binti Tengku Muhammad and Shukri bin Abdullah (the Sultan's first cousin twice removed and first cousin twice removed-in-law)
- Tengku Embong binti Almarhum Sultan Muhammad IV (the Sultan's great grandaunt)
- Tengku Kembang Petri binti Almarhum Sultan Muhammad IV and Tengku Muhammad Petra bin Almarhum Tengku Petra Semerak Idris (the Sultan's great grandaunt and great granduncle)
- Tengku Zubaidah binti Almarhum Sultan Muhammad IV (the Sultan's great grandaunt)
- Tengku Zainab binti Almarhum Sultan Muhammad IV (the Sultan's great grandaunt)

(Descendants of Tengku Abdul Hamid bin Tengku Muda Sulong Abdul Putra and Tengku Azizah binti Tengku Mohd Hamzah):

- Tengku Iskandar @ Tengku Kamarudin bin Tengku Abdul Hamid (b. 1945)
  (the Sultan's uncle)
- Dato' Tengku Mahmood bin Tengku Abdul Hamid and Datin Nazirah
  (the Sultan's uncle and aunt-in-law)
- Datin Tengku Anisah binti Tengku Abdul Hamid, the Tengku Keso’ma Mastika (b. 1950) and Dato' Mohamed bin Dato' Haji Hussein (b. 1950)
  (the Sultan's aunt and uncle-in-law)
- Tengku Abdul Rahman bin Tengku Abdul Hamid (b. 1952) and Chesaya Yike
  (the Sultan's uncle and aunt-in-law)
- Prof. Dato' Dr. Tengku Aizan binti Tengku Abdul Hamid (b. 1958) and Dr. Mohamed bin Mohd Salleh
  (the Sultan's aunt and uncle-in-law)
- Dato' Tengku Aniza binti Tengku Abdul Hamid (b. 1960)
  (the Sultan's aunt)

== See also ==
- Sultan of Kelantan
- Family tree of Kelantanese monarchs
- Family tree of Malaysian monarchs
