= Tengku Amalin A'ishah Putri =

Malaysian princess (born 1984)

Tengku Amalin A'ishah Putri تڠكو عملين عائشة ڤوتري
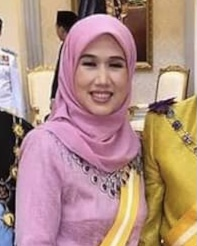
- Tengku Amalin A'ishah Putri in 2019

Tengku Maharani Putri
- Tenure: 3 March 2019 – present
- Born: Tengku Amalin A'ishah Putri binti Sultan Ismail Petra; 26 June 1984 (age 42); Kota Bharu, Kelantan, Malaysia
- Spouse: Pengiran Muda Abdul Qawi (m. 2013)
- Issue: List: Pengiran Anak Tengku Afeefah Musyafaah Bolkiah Putri; Pengiran Anak Tengku Azzahra Iffatul Bolkiah Putri; Pengiran Anak Tengku Zaafirah Muizzah Bolkiah Putri; Pengiran Anak Tengku Abdul Muhaimin Bolkiah Petra
Names
- Tengku Amalin A'ishah Putri binti Almarhum Sultan Ismail Petra
- House: Long Yunus (by birth); Bolkiah (by marriage)
- Father: Sultan Ismail Petra
- Mother: Raja Perempuan Tengku Anis

Tengku Amalin A'ishah Putri binti Almarhum Sultan Ismail Petra (born 26 June 1984) is a member of the Kelantan royal family who is the Tengku Maharani Putri. She is the youngest child and only daughter of the 28th Sultan of Kelantan, Sultan Ismail Petra and Raja Perempuan Tengku Anis, and the youngest sibling of the 29th and current Sultan of Kelantan, Sultan Muhammad V.

== Early life and education ==
Tengku Amalin was born in Kota Bharu, Kelantan on 26 June 1984 as the youngest child and only daughter of the 28th Sultan of Kelantan, Sultan Ismail Petra and Raja Perempuan Tengku Anis. Her siblings are Sultan Muhammad V (the 29th Sultan of Kelantan and the 15th Yang di-Pertuan Agong of Malaysia), Tengku Muhammad Fa-iz Petra and Tengku Muhammad Fakhry Petra.

Tengku Amalin received her early education at Tengku Anis Kindergarten. She continued her primary education at Zainab Primary School (2) and her secondary education at Naim Lil-Banat Islamic Secondary School. She attended Centre for Foundation Studies, at International Islamic University of Malaysia (lIUM) and continued with her studies at IIUM reading both Civil Laws and Shariah Laws. Later, she obtained her Bachelor of Laws (LLB) (Hons). She then pursued her Master of Law (LLM) studies at the University of Melbourne.

== Career ==
On 20 June 2006, Tengku Amalin joined the Judicial and Legal Service Commission as a judicial officer. Kota Bharu Magistrate's Court was Tengku Amalin’s first posting until 15 July 2009. One of the cases she handled was of businessman Datuk Nik Sapeia Nik Yusoff spraying the former Prime Minister of Malaysia Tun Dr Mahathir Mohamad's eyes with a dangerous chemical sprayer. She also received criticism from scholars in Kelantan and caused controversy in the state for sentencing a religious school student to prison for only wearing turban while riding a motorcycle before being arrested by law enforcement in Kubang Kerian in January 2009.

Tengku Amalin then was posted as Senior Deputy Registrar and Deputy Registrar at Kuala Lumpur High Court (Civil) until 15 July 2012. Her task was to hear and determine disputes between litigants in civil cases, and their sentences if convicted.

== Personal life ==
Tengku Amalin married Pengiran Muda Abdul Qawi, a member of the Brunei Royal Family at Istana Mahkota in Kubang Kerian, Kelantan on 27 June 2013.

She gave birth to their first child and eldest daughter, Pengiran Anak Tengku Afeefah Musyafaah Bolkiah Putri, on 13 April 2014. On 24 June 2016, she gave birth to their second child and second daughter, Pengiran Anak Tengku Azzahra Iffatul Bolkiah Putri. She gave birth to their third child and third daughter, Pengiran Anak Tengku Zaafirah Muizzah Bolkiah Putri, who was born on 12 February 2020. On 26 June 2022, she gave birth to their fourth child and first son, Pengiran Anak Tengku Abdul Muhaimin Bolkiah Petra.

== Honours ==
Styles of Tengku Amalin A'ishah Putri
- Reference style: Her Highness
- Spoken style: Your Highness
- Alternative style: Tengku

- Kelantan
  - Tengku Maharani Putri (3 March 2019)
  - Recipient of the Royal Family Order of Kelantan (DK) (26 June 2006)
  - Recipient of the Sultan Muhammad V Proclamation Medal (13 September 2010)

=== Foreign honours ===
- Brunei
  - Sultan of Brunei Golden Jubilee Medal (5 October 2017)

== Namesakes ==
Several places were named after her, including:

- Sekolah Menengah Kebangsaan Agama Tengku Amalin A'Ishah Putri, an Islamic secondary school in Kota Bharu, Kelantan
- Sekolah Rendah Agama Tengku Amalin A'Ishah Putri, an Islamic primary school in Kota Bharu, Kelantan
