= Istana Jahar =

Royal residence in Kota Bharu, Malaysia

Coordinates: 6°07′54.3″N 102°14′13.9″E

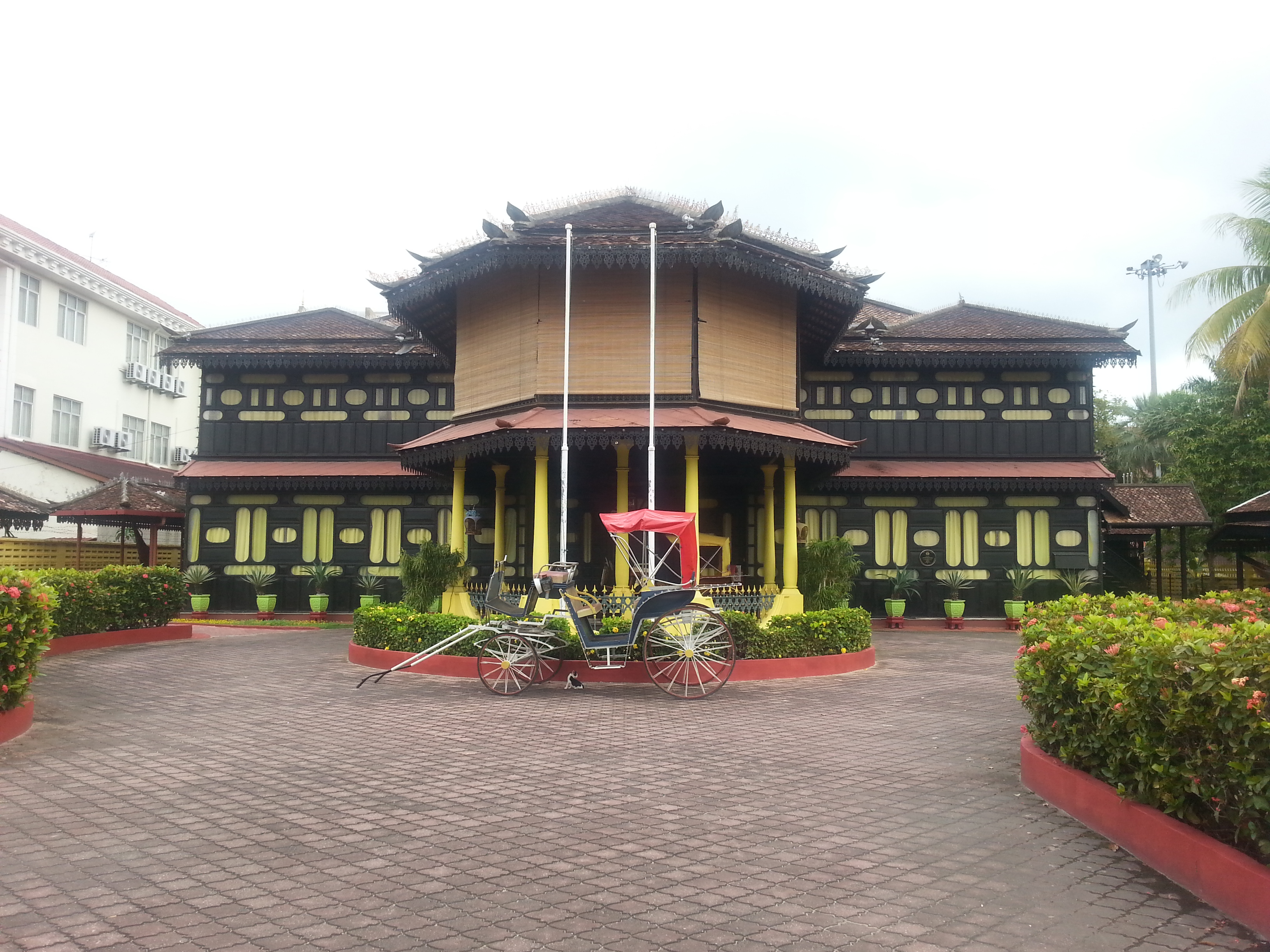
Istana Jahar

The Istana Jahar was a royal residence in Kota Bharu, Kelantan, Malaysia.

It was built in 1855 by Sultan Muhammad II of Kelantan for his grandson Raja Bendahara Long Kundor. The palace has a pentagon-shaped porte-cochère with the first floor balcony from which members of the royal family could watch ceremonies held in front of the palace. It was named after a jahar tree which was growing in the grounds at the time.

Today, the palace houses the Museum of Royal Traditions and Customs of Kelantan.
