= Pengiran Muda Abdul Qawi =

Bruneian prince (born 1974)

Pengiran Muda Abdul Qawi ڤڠيرن مودا عبدالقوى
- Tengku Sri Utama Raja
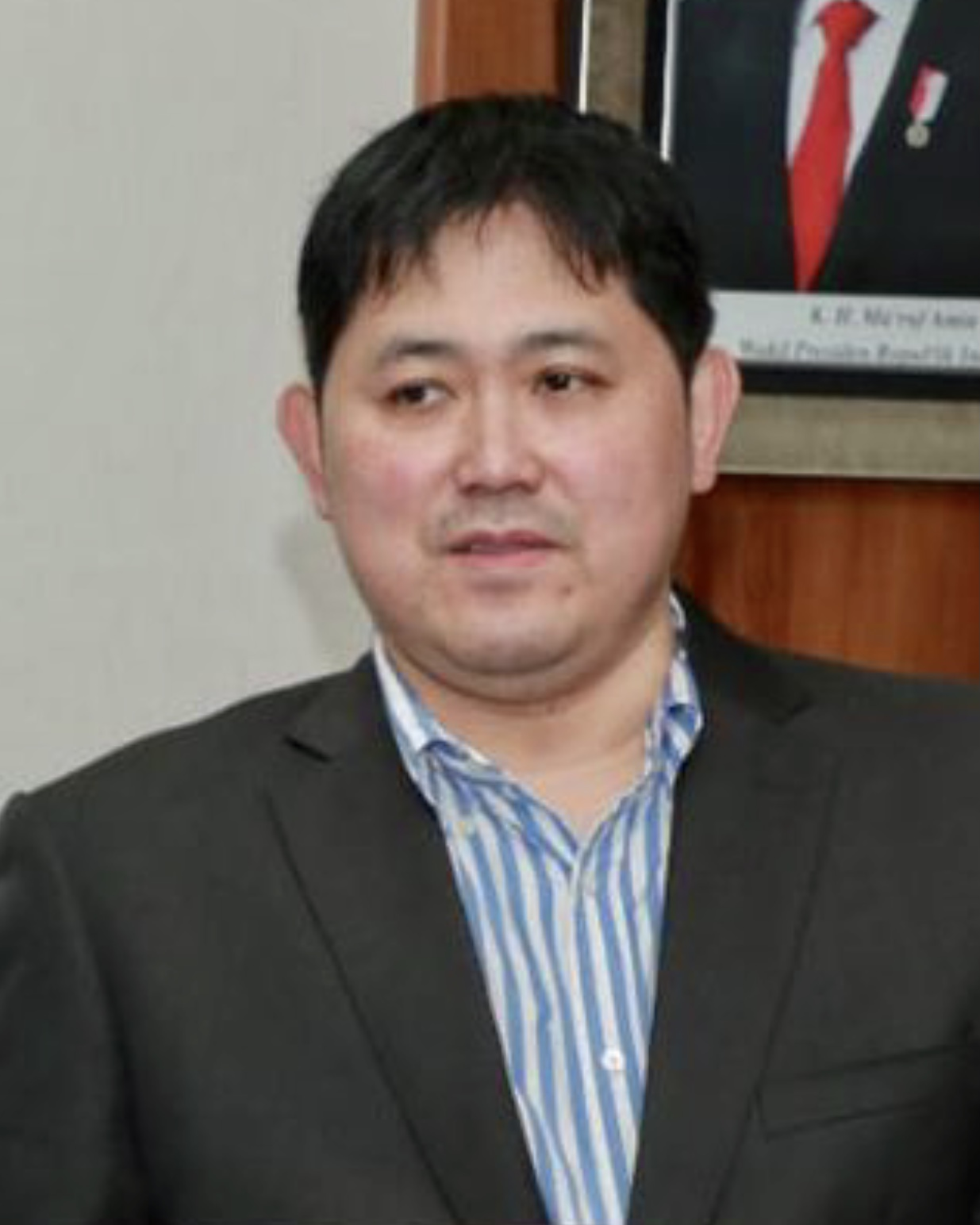
- Abdul Qawi in 2022
- Born: 27 January 1974 (age 52); Bandar Seri Begawan, Brunei
- Spouse: Tengku Amalin A'ishah Putri (m. 2013)
- Issue: List: Pengiran Anak Tengku Afeefah Musyafaah Bolkiah Putri; Pengiran Anak Tengku Azzahra Iffatul Bolkiah Putri; Pengiran Anak Tengku Zaafirah Muizzah Bolkiah Putri; Pengiran Anak Tengku Abdul Muhaimin Bolkiah Petra
- House: Bolkiah (by birth); Long Yunus (by marriage)
- Father: Prince Mohamed Bolkiah
- Mother: Pengiran Anak Zariah
- Sports career
- Country: Brunei
- Sport: Polo
Medal record
Polo
Representing Brunei
SEA Games
Bronze medal – third place	2017 Kuala Lumpur	Men's tournament
Gold medal – first place	2019 Philippines	Men's tournament

Abdul Qawi ibni Mohamed Bolkiah (Note: State publications still refer to him as Pengiran Muda Abdul Qawi rather than Prince Abdul Qawi, even though sons of the sultan and the oldest son of the Wazirs with their royal spouses are referred to as Pengiran Muda, a Bruneian aristocratic title that means "Prince" in English.) (born 27 January 1974) is a businessman and member of the Brunei royal family. He is the nephew of Sultan Hassanal Bolkiah of Brunei and the brother-in-law of Sultan Muhammad V of Kelantan, Malaysia.

== Early life and education ==
Pengiran Muda Abdul Qawi was born on 27 August 1974 at 2 p.m. in Bandar Seri Begawan, Brunei. He is the eldest son of Prince Mohamed Bolkiah and Pengiran Anak Hajah Zariah. He received his early education at St. Andrew's School before continuing his secondary education at Paduka Seri Begawan Sultan Science College, where he passed the GCE Ordinary Level. Following this, he pursued his GCE A Levels at St Andrew's College in the United Kingdom and later continued his studies at Queen Mary and Westfield College, University of London, where he earned a Bachelor of Politics with business management degree. Additionally, he attended the Singapore Armed Forces' Commando School.

== Business career ==
After graduating in 1998, Abdul Qawi began his career as a research officer at the Ministry of Foreign Affairs and Trade. (Note: Abdul Qawi was allegedly being prepared by his father to assume the foreign affairs ministry.) However, in 2000, he resigned from his role to pursue a career in business. Over the years, he has held several significant leadership positions. He was the chairman of The Brunei Hotel, and served as deputy and executive chairman of QAF Brunei. He was also a member of the Baiduri Group and a director at Baiduri Bank from 2000 to 2010.

From 2002 to 2012, he was a member of the ASEAN Business Advisory Council, and since 2005, he has actively participated in the INSEAD East Asia Business Council and patron to the Brunei–Britain Business Forum. He has been involved with the Confederation of Asia-Pacific Chambers of Commerce and Industry since 2004, and in 2010, he became a patron of the Young Entrepreneurs Association Brunei.

Abdul Qawi also serves as the non-executive chairman of HS Optimus Holdings, a role he took up on 30 September 2014 and was re-elected to on 28 July 2022. In addition, he is the chairman of National Insurance, QOS, Everon, and Supremo Management Services in Brunei. His extensive experience and leadership have made him a key figure in both the business and diplomatic landscapes of Brunei.

== Diplomatic career ==
Abdul Qawi has played a prominent role in numerous key diplomatic and business engagements, particularly during international visits. In March 2002, accompanying Crown Prince Al-Muhtadee Billah on a working visit to China and Japan, he contributed significantly to Brunei’s diplomatic efforts. In China, the delegation engaged in high-level discussions with Vice President Hu Jintao and President Jiang Zemin, focusing on strengthening economic and trade relations. In Japan, he participated in meetings with Prime Minister Junichiro Koizumi and Foreign Minister Yoriko Kawaguchi, exploring opportunities for increased tourism cooperation between the two nations.

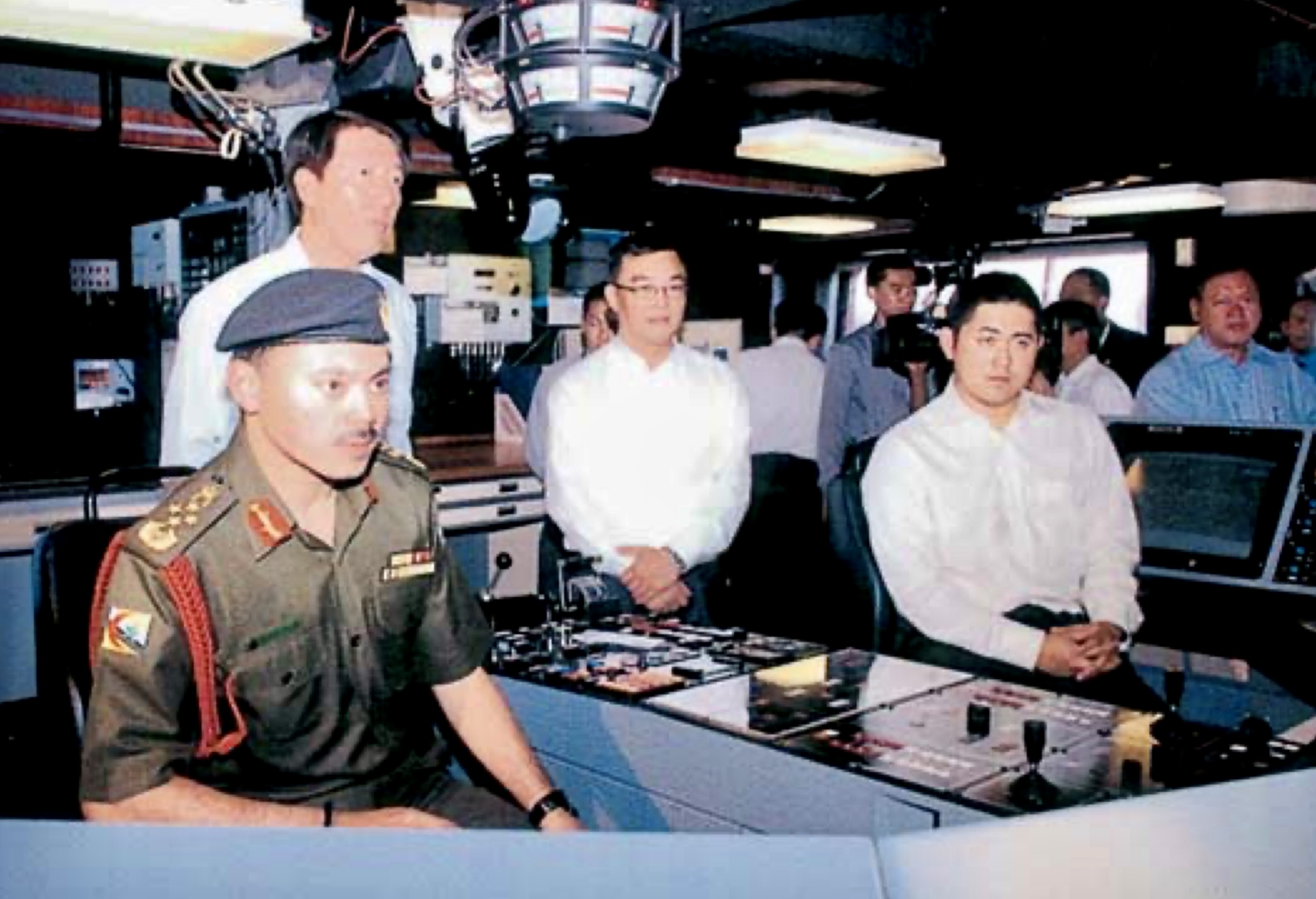
Prince Al-Muhtadee Billah and Abdul Qawi touring the RSS Persistence (209) on 10 March 2005

Further cementing his diplomatic involvement, Abdul Qawi joined Al-Muhtadee Billah during an official visit to Singapore in March 2005. The visit, which also included Princess Sarah, offered him the opportunity to learn about Singapore's defence strategies, international terrorism, and regional security, as well as the country's developments in broadcasting through a visit to MediaCorp Caldecott Broadcast Centre.

In August 2010, Abdul Qawi accompanied the Al-Muhtadee Billah to Kuwait, where he participated in high-level meetings with officials, including the Deputy Speaker of the National Assembly, the Acting Prime Minister and Minister of Defense, and the deputy chairman of the Kuwait Fund for Arab Economic Development. This visit also saw him attend official events, such as a luncheon with the Acting Prime Minister and a supper hosted by the President of the National Security Bureau at the Kuwait Towers, further strengthening bilateral relations.

Abdul Qawi's role as an international ambassador continued in September 2011, when he joined Al-Muhtadee Billah at George Washington University. Their discussions focused on potential collaborations in foreign affairs, science, sustainability, faculty research, and student exchanges, advancing Brunei’s educational and research partnerships.

In July 2013, his father, Prince Mohamed Bolkiah, discussed Abdul Qawi's involvement in foreign relations with Japan's Foreign Minister Fumio Kishida. The talks highlighted Japan’s support for Brunei's ASEAN chairmanship and extended congratulations on his wedding, reaffirming Japan's diplomatic support for Brunei.

Abdul Qawi's business acumen was evident in May 2016 when he led an international business delegation seeking investment opportunities in Vietnam's Thanh Hóa province. He was welcomed by State President Tran Dai Quang. His efforts attracted investments from Canada, Singapore, Indonesia, Hong Kong, Taiwan, and Spain, focusing on energy, infrastructure, and industrial development.

In November 2022, he met with Zainal Fatah, the secretary general of Indonesia's public works ministry, to discuss Brunei’s involvement in the construction of Nusantara, Indonesia’s new capital. Their discussions centred on potential collaboration in government-business partnerships for infrastructure projects, such as water supply systems and toll roads, showcasing Qawi’s continuous engagement in international business ventures.

== Personal life ==
=== Personal interests ===
On 9 May 2006, Abdul Qawi visited the Singapore Badminton Association (SBA), where he participated in a friendly badminton match. He partnered with Lim Swee Say, president of the SBA and Minister in the Prime Minister's Office. Subsequently, he joined forces with Crown Prince Haji Al-Muhtadee Billah in a competitive match against Singaporean national players Erwin and Kendrick Lee.

On 24 January 2007, QAF FC's captain, Abdul Qawi, guided his squad with a positive attitude throughout the 2007–08 Brunei Premier League final. Christopher Ambun and Viban Francis Bayong both headed goals from corner kicks to give QAF FC an early lead under his direction. Despite QAF FC's ultimate 3-2 loss against MS ABDB in extra time, he was able to keep the team's morale up throughout the game.

The equestrian polo competition at the 2017 SEA Games, Kuala Lumpur began on 22 August at the Putrajaya Equestrian Park. According to the list of competing teams, four of the seven players mentioned in the Brunei polo squad—Prince Abdul Mateen, Princess Azemah Ni'matul Bolkiah, Pengiran Muda Bahar, and Abdul Qawi.

=== Marriage ===
On 24 June 2013, the parents of Pengiran Muda Abdul Qawi attended the wedding ceremony in Kota Bharu, Kelantan, marking the union of their son with Tengku Amalin A'ishah Putri, daughter of Sultan Ismail Petra. The Majlis Akad Nikah ceremony took place on 27 June 2013 at Istana Mahkota, where formal messages were exchanged between representatives of the royal families during the engagement ceremony took place at Istana Negeri Kubang Kerian. The exchange of gifts on bronze trays and adherence to traditional customs underscored the ceremonial legacy shared by both royal families.

A key moment in the engagement ceremony, officially known as the Majlis Istiadat Pertunangan, involved Pengiran Anak Haji Puteh, the personal representative of Prince Mohamed Bolkiah and Pengiran Anak Hajah Zariah, delivering a formal request for marriage approval to Tengku Mohamad Rizam, the representative of the Sultan of Kelantan. This gesture symbolised the formal sanction of the union and highlighted the significance of traditional protocol in the royal wedding process.

Following the wedding, a series of celebratory events took place. On 7 July 2013, a Majlis Istiadat Doa Kesyukuran was held at Balai Penghadapan, Bukit Kayangan, honouring the newlyweds. The event featured a Dikir recital and Doa Kesyukuran, followed by a banquet attended by members of Brunei's and Kelantan's royal families, government officials, and diplomats. Another significant event, the Majlis Kesyukuran and Doa Selamat on 8 July 2013, commenced with the lighting of the Dian Empat candles and the recitation of prayers, symbolising blessings for the union. Distinguished guests, including members of the royal family, Pengiran Cheterias, and high-ranking officials, gathered to celebrate the historic union of the two royal families.

=== Issue ===
From their marriage, the royal couple has four children. On 13 April 2014, the royal couple welcomed their first child, a princess named Pengiran Anak Tengku Afeefah Musyafaah Bolkiah Putri. Their second child, a daughter, Pengiran Anak Tengku Azzahra Iffatul Bolkiah Putri, was born on 24 June 2016. A third child, a daughter named Pengiran Anak Tengku Zaafirah Muizzah Bolkiah Putri was born on 12 February 2020. A fourth child and first son, Pengiran Anak Tengku Abdul Muhaimin Bolkiah Petra was born on 26 June 2022.

Name	Born	Place Birth	Age
Pengiran Anak Tengku Afeefah Musyafaah Bolkiah Putri	13 April 2014	Singapore	12 years, 6 months and 23 days
Pengiran Anak Tengku Azzahra Iffatul Bolkiah Putri	24 June 2016	Singapore	10 years, 4 months and 12 days
Pengiran Anak Tengku Zaafirah Muizzah Bolkiah Putri	12 February 2020	Kelantan, Malaysia	6 years, 8 months and 24 days
Pengiran Anak Tengku Abdul Muhaimin Bolkiah Petra	26 June 2022	Brunei	4 years, 4 months and 10 days

== Titles, styles and honours ==
=== Titles and styles ===
Abdul Qawi was honoured with the title of Tengku Sri Utama Raja during the investiture ceremony held in conjunction with Sultan Muhammad V's 53rd birthday celebration in Kota Bharu in 2022. This prestigious award, presented by the Sultan, was part of a broader ceremony recognising the contributions of several dignitaries. In addition to this, Abdul Qawi was also awarded the Darjah Kebesaran Mahkota Kelantan Yang Amat Mulia (SPMK) which carries the title of Dato'.

=== Honours ===
Honours awarded to him are as follows:

National

- Proclamation of Independence Medal (1 January 1984)
- Sultan of Brunei Silver Jubilee Medal (5 October 1992)
- Sultan of Brunei Golden Jubilee Medal (5 October 2017)
- National Day Silver Jubilee Medal (23 February 2009)
- Meritorious Service Medal (PJK; 2 June 2022)

Foreign

- Kelantan:
  - Tengku Sri Utama Raja (2022)
  - Knight Grand Commander of the Order of the Crown of Kelantan (SPMK) – Dato' (24 October 2022)

== Notes ==
Pengiran Muda Abdul Qawi House of Bolkiah Born: 27 January 1974
Preceded by Mohamed Bolkiah	Succession to the Bruneian throne 8th position	Succeeded by Abdul Muhaimin
Malaysian royalty
Preceded by Tengku Abdul Aziz	Tengku Sri Utama Raja; 2022–present	Incumbent
