= Istana Balai Besar =

Royal residence in Kelantan, Malaysia

Grand Hall Palace
- Istana Balai Besar ايستان بالاي بسر; Istano Bala Besa
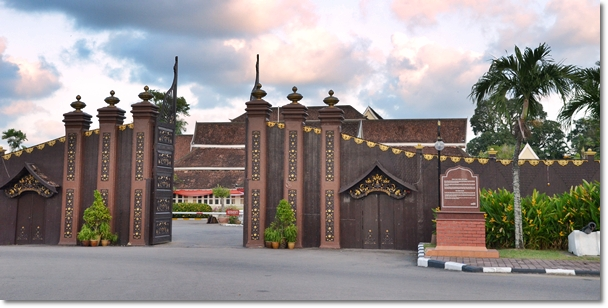
- Interactive map of the Grand Hall Palace area

General information
- Type: Palace
- Location: Kota Bharu, Kelantan, Malaysia
- Coordinates: 6.1310°N 102.2379°E
- Completed: 1844

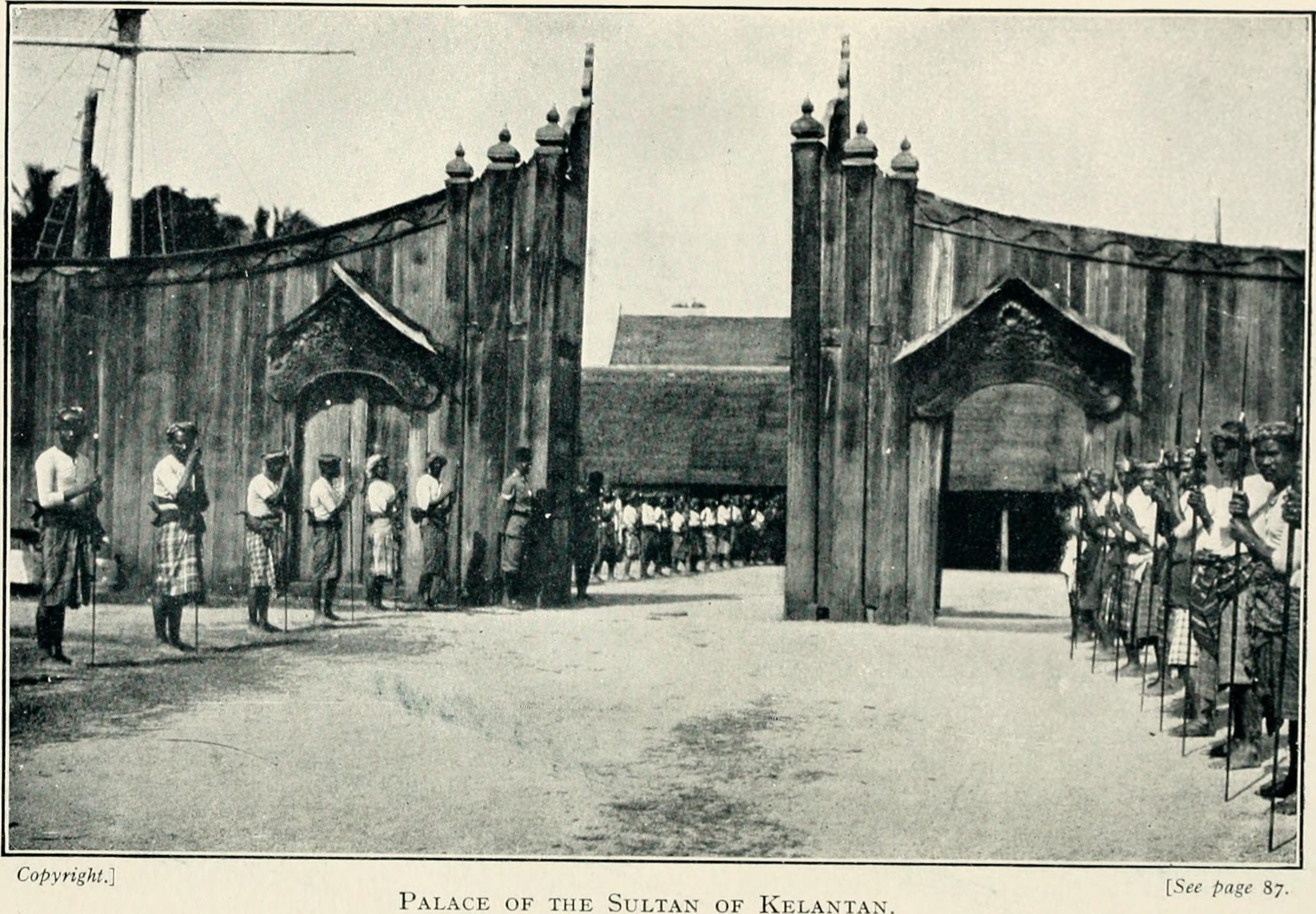
Istana Balai Besar, 1912.

Istana Balai Besar or Grand Hall Palace is the royal palace of the Sultan of Kelantan which is located in Kota Bharu, Kelantan, Malaysia.

== History ==
Istana Balai Besar (Grand Hall Palace) was first built by Sultan Muhammad II to replace the Kelantan Administration Center at Istana Kota Lama (Kampung Galuh) and Kota Kebun Menseta (Pulau Saba), transitioning to the current location in Kota Bharu. Construction began around 1842 and was completed by 1844. The palace was constructed by a renowned carpenter and wood carver, led by Muhamad Salleh, who was from Terengganu. He was one of the few professional craftsmen available during that time.

Covering approximately 1.6 hectares in the heart of Kota Bharu, it hosted the first significant historic event: receiving the “Surat Pejabat” (Official Letter) from the Raja Maha Besar Siam, acknowledging and recognizing the royal throne of Kelantan, under the leadership of Sultan Muhammad II. Since then, Istana Balai Besar has hosted numerous royal and state events.

Istana Balai Besar served as the official royal residence of Sultan Muhammad II (1839–1886), Sultan Ahmad (1886–1889), Sultan Muhammad III (1890–1891), Sultan Mansur (1891–1900), and Sultan Muhammad IV (1900–1920). After Sultan Muhammad IV, the palace became the venue for grand royal and traditional events, a role it continues to fulfill to this day.

Istana Balai Besar is currently used only for investitures, state banquets and royal functions.
