= Sofie Louise Johansson Petra =

Former Crown Princess of Kelantan (born 1986)

Sofie Louise Johansson Petra سوفي لوءيس يوهنسون ڤيترا
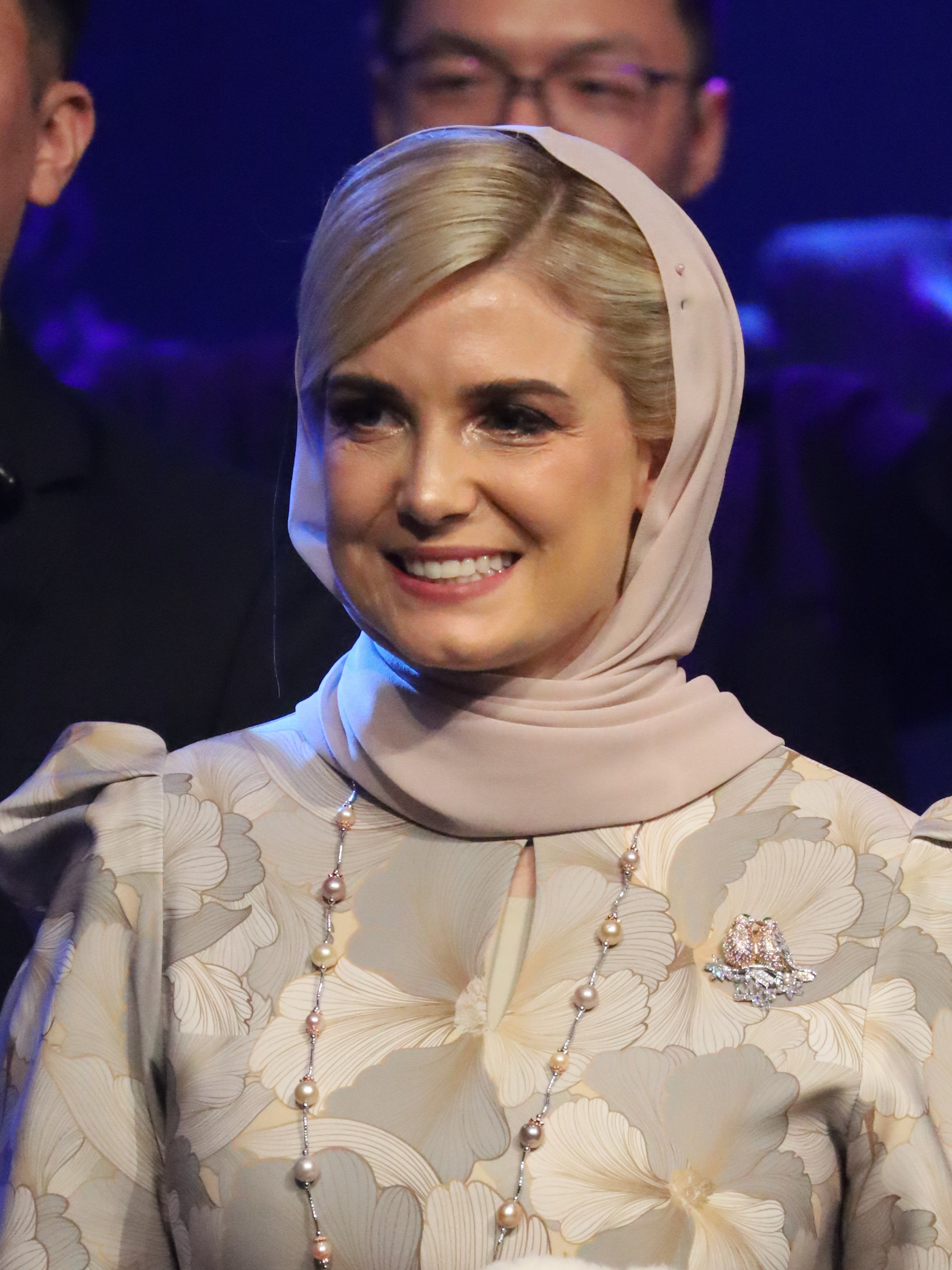
- Sofie Louise Johansson Petra in 2025

Che Puan Mahkota of Kelantan
- Tenure: 2 August 2022 – 4 January 2024
- Proclamation: 12 November 2022
- Predecessor: Tengku Zubaidah (as Tengku Ampuan Mahkota)
- Successor: Vacant
- Born: Sofie Louise Johansson; 6 June 1986 (age 40); Mjölby, Kingdom of Sweden
- Spouse: Tengku Muhammad Fa-iz Petra (m. 2019)
- Issue: Tengku Muhammad Johan Petra
Regnal name
- Che Puan Sofie Louise Johansson Petra
- House: Long Yunus (by marriage)
- Religion: Sunni Islam

Che Puan Sofie Louise Johansson Petra (Jawi: چيء ڤوان سوفي لوءيس يوهنسون ڤيترا; born 6 June 1986) is a Swedish member of the Kelantan royal family as the wife of Tengku Muhammad Fa-iz Petra, the former Tengku Mahkota (Crown Prince) of Kelantan state in Malaysia.

== Early life ==
Johansson was born and raised in Mantorp, Mjölby, Sweden. She graduated in English and Sociology Studies.

She moved to the United Kingdom to work as an au pair.

== Personal life ==
Johansson married the then-Tengku Mahkota (Crown Prince) of Kelantan Tengku Muhammad Fa-iz Petra on 19 April 2019 at Istana Balai Besar, Kota Bharu, Kelantan.

She gave birth to their first child and eldest son, Tengku Muhammad Johan Petra, on 17 July 2023.

== Titles and styles ==
Styles of Che Puan Sofie Louise Johansson Petra
- Reference style: The Honourable
- Spoken style: The Honourable
- Alternative style: Che Puan

As a commoner who became consort to a prince and senior member of the royal family, she was granted the honorific form of address as Che Puan (glossed as "Lady") and the style of Yang Berbahagia (translated as "The Honourable").

She was previously bestowed the title Che Puan Mahkota of Kelantan (equivalent to the Crown Princess) by her brother-in-law, Sultan Muhammad V. She was styled as Her Highness Che Puan Sofie Louise Johansson Petra, Che Puan Mahkota of Kelantan effectively from 2 August 2022 until 4 January 2024.

The full title and style of Che Puan Sofie Louise is:

The Honourable Che Puan Sofie Louise Johansson Petra, S.P.M.K.

== Issue ==
| Name | Born | Place birth | Age |
|---|---|---|---|
| His Highness Tengku Muhammad Johan Petra Bin Tengku Muhammad Fa-iz Petra | 17 July 2023 | Hospital Universiti Sains Malaysia (HUSM), Kubang Kerian, Kota Bharu, Kelantan | 3 years |

== Honour ==
- Kelantan
  - Knight Grand Commander of the Order of the Crown of Kelantan (SPMK) – Dato' (2022)

== Award and nomination ==
| Year | Award | Category | Result |
|---|---|---|---|
| 2020 | NONA Superwoman Award | NONA Royal Award | Won |
