= Orders, decorations, and medals of Kelantan =

Honorific order of the Sultanate of Kelantan

The following is the orders, decorations, and medals given by Sultan of Kelantan. When applicable, post-nominal letters and non-hereditary titles are indicated.

== Order of precedence for the wearing of order insignias, decorations, and medals ==
Precedence:

1.
Darjah Kerabat Yang Amat Di-Hormati (Al-Yunusi)
D.K.
--
2.
The Order for Kerabat Titleholders
Darjah Kerabat Bergelar
and The Order for Dato' Titleholders
Darjah Dato' Bergelar

BERGELAR
- Tengku Besar Indera Raja
- Tengku Sri Maharaja
- Tengku Sri Utama Raja
- Tengku Sri Mara Raja
- Tengku Seriwa Raja
- Tengku Sri Wangsa
- Tengku Sri Kelana D'Raja
- Tengku Sri Ismara Raja
- Tengku Sri Wangsa Raja
- Tengku Sri Indera Mahkota
- Tengku Sri Pekerma Raja
- Tengku Sri Akar Raja
- Tengku Temenggong Aria Pahlawan
- Tengku Kaya Pahlawan
- Tengku Kaya Perkasa
- Tengku Sri Jaya Raja
- Tengku Selia Raja
- Tengku Petra Semerak
- Tengku Maharani Putri
- Tengku Maharani
- Tengku Keso'ma Mastika
- Dato' Sri Paduka Raja
- Dato' Sri Setia Raja
- Dato' Sri Amar D'Raja
- Dato' Sri D'Raja
- Dato' Sri Nara D'Raja
- Dato' Sri Nirmala
- Dato' Sri Ratna D'Raja
- Dato' Sri Derma
- Dato' Amar D'Raja
- Dato' Aria D'Raja
- Dato' Bentara Setia
- Dato' Wira Jaya
- Dato' Istiadat Mahkota
- Dato' Bentara Kanan
- Dato' Bentara Kiri
- Dato' Bentara Dalam
- Dato' Bentara Luar
- Dato' Kaya Muda
- Dato' Bentara Muda
- Dato' Bentara Jaya
- Dato' Biji Sura
- Dato' Lela D'Raja
- Dato' Adika Raja
- Dato' Kaya Setia
- Dato' Lela Negara
- Dato' Lela Jasa
- Dato' Kaya Bakti
- Dato' Kaya Nara
- Dato' Kaya Ratna
- Dato' Kaya Pati
- Dato' Kaya Perba
- Dato' Perwira Raja
- Dato' Kaya Derma
- Dato' Kaya Budi
- Dato' Megat Lela D'Raja
- Dato' Bandar
- Dato' Panglima Laut
- Dato' Panglima Perang
- Dato' Lela Muda
- Dato' Bentara Guna
- Dato' Penghulu Balai
- Dato' Kaya Hulubalang
- Dato' Kaya Perwara
- Dato' Biji Wangsa
- Dato' Bentara Sakti
- Dato' Bentara Ratna
- Dato' Megat Muda
- Dato' Lela Perkasa
- Dato' Panglima Dalam
- Dato' Megat Mahkota
- Dato' Ratna Nila
3.
Darjah Seri Paduka Mahkota Kelantan (Al-Muhammadi I)
S.P.M.K.
Dato'
4.
Darjah Seri Paduka Jiwa Mahkota Kelantan (Al-Ismaili I)
S.J.M.K.
Dato'
5.
Darjah Seri Paduka Kesateria Mahkota Kelantan (Al-Yahyawi I)
S.P.K.K.
Dato'
6.
Darjah Seri Paduka Setia Mahkota Kelantan (Al-Ibrahimi I)
S.P.S.K.
Dato'
7.
Darjah Seri Paduka Jasa Mahkota Kelantan (Al-Petrawi I)
S.P.J.K.
Dato'
8.
Darjah Pahlawan Yang Amat Gagah Perkasa
P.Y.G.P.
--
9.
Darjah Dato' Paduka Mahkota Kelantan (Al-Muhammadi II)
D.P.M.K.
Dato’
10.
Darjah Dato' Paduka Jiwa Mahkota Kelantan (Al-Ismaili II)
D.J.M.K.
Dato’
11.
Darjah Dato' Paduka Kesateria Mahkota Kelantan (Al-Yahyawi II)
D.P.K.K.
Dato’
12.
Darjah Dato' Paduka Setia Mahkota Kelantan (Al-Ibrahimi II)
D.P.S.K.
Dato’
13.
Darjah Dato' Paduka Jasa Mahkota Kelantan (Al-Petrawi II)
D.P.J.K.
Dato’
14.
Paduka Mahkota Kelantan (Al-Muhammadi III)
P.M.K.
--
15.
Paduka Setia Jiwa Mahkota Kelantan (Al-Ismaili III)
J.M.K.
--
16.
Paduka Kesateria Mahkota Kelantan (Al-Yahyawi III)
P.K.K.
--
17.
Paduka Setia Mahkota Kelantan (Al-Ibrahimi III)
P.S.K.
--
18.
Paduka Jasa Mahkota Kelantan (Al-Petrawi III)
P.J.K.
--
19.
Bentara Setia Mahkota Kelantan (Al-Ibrahimi IV)
B.S.K.
--
20.
Bentara Jasa Mahkota Kelantan (Al-Petrawi IV)
B.J.K.
--
21.
Ahli Setia Mahkota Kelantan (Al-Ibrahimi V)
A.S.K.
--
22.
Ahli Jasa Mahkota Kelantan (Al-Petrawi V)
A.J.K.
--
23.
Seri Mahkota Kelantan
S.M.K.
--
24.
Seri Kelantan
S.K.
--
25.
Ahli Kelantan
A.K.
--
26.
Jaksa Pendamai
J.P.
--
27.
Pingat Bakti
P.B.
--
28.
Pingat Setia Mahkota Kelantan
P.S.
--
29.
Pingat Taat
P.T.
--
30.
Pingat Perangai Baik
P.P.B.
--

== Orders, decorations, and medals ==
The Most Esteemed Royal Family Order of Kelantan or the Star of Yunus - Darjah Kerabat Yang Amat Dihormati (Bintang Al-Yunusi)

- Founded by Sultan Muhammad IV in honour of Long Yunus on 9 August 1916.
- Awarded in a single class (D.K.), limited to 25 recipients at any one time and reserved for members of the royal families and state dignitaries.
- The sash of the order is worn from the left shoulder to the right hip.

The Order for Kerabat Titleholders - Darjah Kerabat Bergelar

  - Tengku Besar Indera Raja
  - Tengku Sri Maharaja
  - Tengku Sri Utama Raja
  - Tengku Sri Mara Raja
  - Tengku Seriwa Raja
  - Tengku Sri Wangsa
  - Tengku Sri Kelana D'Raja
  - Tengku Sri Ismara Raja
  - Tengku Sri Wangsa Raja
  - Tengku Sri Indera Mahkota
  - Tengku Sri Pekerma Raja
  - Tengku Sri Akar Raja
  - Tengku Temenggong Aria Pahlawan
  - Tengku Kaya Pahlawan
  - Tengku Kaya Perkasa
  - Tengku Sri Jaya Raja
  - Tengku Selia Raja
  - Tengku Petra Semerak
  - Tengku Maharani Putri
  - Tengku Maharani
  - Tengku Keso'ma Mastika

The Order for Dato' Titleholders - Darjah Dato' Bergelar

  - Dato' Sri Paduka Raja
  - Dato' Sri Setia Raja
  - Dato' Sri Amar D'Raja
  - Dato' Sri D'Raja
  - Dato' Sri Nara D'Raja
  - Dato' Sri Nirmala
  - Dato' Sri Ratna D'Raja
  - Dato' Sri Derma
  - Dato' Amar D'Raja
  - Dato' Aria D'Raja
  - Dato' Bentara Setia
  - Dato' Wira Jaya
  - Dato' Istiadat Mahkota
  - Dato' Bentara Kanan
  - Dato' Bentara Kiri
  - Dato' Bentara Dalam
  - Dato' Bentara Luar
  - Dato' Kaya Muda
  - Dato' Bentara Muda
  - Dato' Bentara Jaya
  - Dato' Biji Sura
  - Dato' Lela D'Raja
  - Dato' Adika Raja
  - Dato' Kaya Setia
  - Dato' Lela Negara
  - Dato' Lela Jasa
  - Dato' Kaya Bakti
  - Dato' Kaya Nara
  - Dato' Kaya Ratna
  - Dato' Kaya Pati
  - Dato' Kaya Perba
  - Dato' Perwira Raja
  - Dato' Kaya Derma
  - Dato' Kaya Budi
  - Dato' Megat Lela D'Raja
  - Dato' Bandar
  - Dato' Panglima Laut
  - Dato' Panglima Perang
  - Dato' Lela Muda
  - Dato' Bentara Guna
  - Dato' Penghulu Balai
  - Dato' Kaya Hulubalang
  - Dato' Kaya Perwara
  - Dato' Biji Wangsa
  - Dato' Bentara Sakti
  - Dato' Bentara Ratna
  - Dato' Megat Muda
  - Dato' Lela Perkasa
  - Dato' Panglima Dalam
  - Dato' Megat Mahkota
  - Dato' Ratna Nila

The Most Illustrious Order of the Crown of Kelantan or the Star of Muhammad - Darjah Kebesaran Mahkota Kelantan Yang Amat Mulia (Bintang Al-Muhammadi)

- Founded by Sultan Muhammad IV in honour of Sultan Muhammad I on 9 August 1916.
- Awarded in three classes :
  - 1. Knight Grand Commander or Seri Paduka - limited to 40 recipients - S.P.M.K.
  - 2. Knight Commander or Dato Paduka - limited to 60 recipients - D.P.M.K.
  - 3. Commander or Paduka - P.M.K.
  - see also The Crown of Kelantan Decoration - Seri Mahkota Kelantan (S.M.K.)
  - see also The Seri Kelantan Decoration - Seri Kelantan (S.K.)

The Most Illustrious Order of the Life of the Crown of Kelantan or the Star of Ismail - Darjah Kebesaran Jiwa Mahkota Kelantan Yang Amat Mulia (Bintang Al-Ismaili)

- Founded by Sultan Ismail on 21 July 1925.
- Awarded in three classes :
  - 1. Knight Grand Commander or Seri Paduka - limited to 50 recipients - S.J.M.K.
  - 2. Knight Commander or Dato Paduka - limited to 75 recipients - D.J.M.K.
  - 3. Companion or Taulan - J.M.K.
  - see also The Ahli Kelantan Decoration - Ahli Kelantan (A.K.)

The Most Valiant Order of the Noble Crown of Kelantan or the Star of Yahya - Darjah Kebesaran Kesateria Mahkota Kelantan Yang Amat Perkasa (Bintang Al-Yahyawi)

- Founded by Sultan Ismail Petra in honour of Sultan Yahya Petra on 29 March 1988.
- Awarded in three classes :
  - 1. Knight Grand Commander or Seri Paduka - limited to 40 recipients - S.P.K.K.
  - 2. Knight Commander or Dato Paduka - limited to 60 recipients - D.P.K.K.
  - 3. Commander or Paduka - P.K.K.

The Most Distinguished Order of the Loyalty to the Crown of Kelantan or the Star of Ibrahim - Darjah Kebesaran Setia Mahkota Kelantan Yang Amat Terbilang (Bintang Al-Ibrahimi)

- Founded by Sultan Yahya Petra in honour of Sultan Ibrahim on 10 December 1967.
- Awarded in five classes :
  - 1. Knight Grand Commander or Seri Paduka - limited to 50 recipients - S.P.S.K.
  - 2. Knight Commander or Dato Paduka - limited to 75 recipients - D.P.S.K.
  - 3. Commander or Paduka - P.S.K.
  - 4. Officer or Bentara - B.S.K.
  - 5. Member or Ahli - A.S.K.
  - and a medal of merit (Pingat Setia Mahkota Kelantan) - P.S.

The Most Loyal Order of the Services to the Crown of Kelantan or the Star of Petra - Darjah Kebesaran Jasa Mahkota Kelantan (Bintang Al-Petrawi)

- Founded by Sultan Muhammad V in honour of Sultan Ismail Petra on 15 May 2016.
- Awarded in five classes :
  - 1. Knight Grand Commander or Seri Paduka - S.P.J.K.
  - 2. Knight Commander or Dato Paduka - D.P.J.K.
  - 3. Commander or Paduka - P.J.K.
  - 4. Officer or Bentara - B.J.K.
  - 5. Member or Ahli - A.J.K.

The Order of the Most Distinguished and Most Valiant Warrior - Darjah Pahlawan Yang Amat Gagah Perkasa Yang Amat Mulia

- Founded by Sultan Muhammad IV on 9 August 1919 as a reward for individual acts of supreme gallantry and valour.
- Awarded in one class (P.Y.G.P.)

Crown of Kelantan Decoration - Seri Mahkota Kelantan

- Instituted by Sultan Muhammad IV in 1916 as a reward for those whose civil services do not qualify for the ordinary classes of the Order of the Crown of Kelantan.
- Awarded in a single class (S.M.K.)
- In reality this decoration functions as the fourth class of the Order of the Crown of Kelantan.

Seri Kelantan Decoration - Seri Kelantan

- Instituted by Sultan Muhammad IV in 1916 as a reward for those whose services do not qualify for the ordinary classes of the Order of the Crown of Kelantan.
- Awarded in a single class (S.K.)
- Originally a military decoration which now functions essentially as the fifth class of the Order of the Crown of Kelantan.

Ahli Kelantan Decoration - Ahli Kelantan

- Instituted by Sultan Ismail in 1925 as a reward for those whose services do not qualify for the ordinary classes of the Order of the Life of the Crown of Kelantan.
- Awarded in a single class (A.K.)
- In reality this decoration functions as the fourth class of the Order of the Life of the Crown of Kelantan.

Meritorious Service Medal - Pingat Bakti

- Instituted by Sultan Ismail in 1925 as a reward for general service and awarded principally to military officers.
- Awarded in a single class, a silver medal (P.B.)

Medal of Loyalty to the Crown of Kelantan - Pingat Setia Mahkota Kelantan

- Instituted by Sultan Yahya Petra in 1967 as a reward for civil servants.
- Awarded in a single class, a silver medal (P.S.)
- In reality this decoration functions as the sixth class of the Order of the Loyalty to the Crown of Kelantan.

Loyal Service Medal - Pingat Taat

- Instituted by Sultan Ismail in 1925 as a reward for long service awarded principally to military personnel.
- Awarded in a single class, a silver medal (P.T.)

Good Conduct Medal - Pingat Perangai Baik

- Instituted by Sultan Ismail in 1939 to reward long service and good conduct in government service.
- Awarded in a single class, a silver medal (P.P.B.)

State Council Opening Commemorative Medal 1939 - Pingat Peringatan Pembukaan Dewan Tinggi 1939

- Instituted by Sultan Muhammad IV to commemorate the opening of the inauguration of the first Kelantan State Council in 1939.
- Awarded in a single class, a silver medal (P.P.M.)

Sultan Ibrahim Coronation Medal - Pingat Kemahkotaan Sultan Ibrahim

- Instituted by Sultan Ibrahim to commemorate his Coronation on 25 October 1944.
- Awarded in a single class, a silver medal.

Sultan Yahya Petra Coronation Medal - Pingat Kemahkotaan Sultan Yahya Petra

- Instituted by Sultan Yahya Petra on 17 July 1961 to commemorate his Coronation.
- Awarded in two classes :
  - 1. Gold - for rulers and royal families
  - 2. Silver - for ordinary recipients.

Sultan Ismail Petra Coronation Medal - Pingat Kemahkotaan Sultan Ismail Petra

- Instituted by Sultan Ismail Petra to commemorate his Coronation on 30 March 1980.
- Awarded in two classes :
  - 1. Gold - for rulers and royal families
  - 2. Silver - for ordinary recipients.

Silver Jubilee Medal - Pingat Jubli Perak

- Instituted by Sultan Ismail Petra to commemorate his Silver Jubilee on 30 March 2004.
- Awarded in two classes :
  - 1. Gold - for rulers and royal families (P.J.P.)
  - 2. Silver - for ordinary recipients (P.J.P.).

Sultan Muhammad V Proclamation Medal - Pingat Pemasyhuran Sultan Muhammad V

- Instituted by Sultan Muhammad V to commemorate his Proclamation on 13 September 2010.
- Awarded in two classes :
  - 1. Gold - for rulers and royal families
  - 2. Silver - for ordinary recipients.

== See also ==
- Orders, decorations, and medals of the Malaysian states and federal territories#Kelantan
- List of post-nominal letters (Kelantan)
