= Juliana Evans =

Malaysian actress and media personality (born 1989)

- Born: Juliana Sophie binti Johari Evans; 5 July 1989 (age 37); Shah Alam, Selangor, Malaysia
- Education: Western Michigan University (BA)
- Occupations: Actress; media personality
- Years active: 2001–present
- Height: 5 ft 5 in (1.65 m)
- Spouse: Tengku Shariffuddin Shah (m. 2017)
- Children: Tengku Kamiliah Zanariah Ruby Ehsan Putri; Tengku Saidatul'Ihsan Zabedah Fauziah Putri; Tengku Ismail Iskandar
- Parents: Johari Evans bin Abdullah (father); Fauziah binti Noordin (mother)

Juliana Sophie binti Johari Evans (born 5 July 1989) is a Malaysian actress and media personality of British and American descent. Evans is a member of the Selangor royal family. She is married to Tengku Shariffuddin Shah, son of Tengku Sulaiman Shah.

Evans made a television appearance at the age of 12 years as a host. She then hosted Remaja, a popular program on TV3. In 2020, Evans was appointed as a Tourism Ambassador for the #PusingSelangorDulu Campaign by the Selangor State Government and the Selangor Ministry of Tourism.

== Early life and education ==
Evans was born on 5 July 1989 in Shah Alam, Selangor. Her father is of British and American descent and her mother is of Malay descent. She is the youngest of three siblings namely Andrew Effendi Evans, Isabelle Evans and Jefri Peter Evans.

At the age of 15, she also represented the state of Selangor in the Artistic Gymnastics event at the national level sports event organized by the Malaysian School Sports Council (MSSC).

She pursued the American Degree Transfer Program at Sunway University as preparation to further her studies in the United States.

In 2012, Evans continued her studies at Western Michigan University, in Kalamazoo, Michigan USA and successfully obtained a Bachelor's Degree of Arts in Film, Video and Media studies with Honours. She's also has been named to the Dean's List Award in recognition of her outstanding scholastic achievement.

Next, upon her graduation in 2014 she also took an acting course for 4 weeks at the New York Film Academy in Los Angeles campus, United States.

== Marriage and issue ==
On 30 April 2017, Evans married His Highness Tengku Shariffuddin Shah bin Tengku Sulaiman Shah, one of a senior members of the Selangor royal family. Currently, her husband is 10th in line to the throne of Selangor.

Through her marriage, Evans became a member of the Royal House of Opu Daeng Celak and are related to notable royal figures, namely:

- The 2nd Yang di-Pertuan Agong, Almarhum Sultan Hisamuddin Alam Shah, husband's paternal great-grandfather.
- The 11th Yang di-Pertuan Agong, Almarhum Sultan Salahuddin Abdul Aziz Shah, husband's paternal grandfather.
- The 8th Yang di-Pertuan Agong, Almarhum Sultan Iskandar, husband's maternal grandfather.
- The 9th Sultan of Selangor, Sultan Sharafuddin Idris Shah, husband's paternal uncle.
- The 17th Yang di-Pertuan Agong and the 5th Sultan of modern Johor, Sultan Ibrahim, husband's maternal uncle.
- The 16th Raja Permaisuri Agong and the 5th Tengku Ampuan of Pahang, Tunku Azizah Aminah Maimunah Iskandariah, husband's maternal aunt.
- The current Raja Muda of Selangor, Tengku Amir Shah, husband's paternal cousin.
- The current Tunku Mahkota of Johor, Tunku Ismail, husband's maternal cousin.
- The current Tengku Mahkota of Pahang, Tengku Hassanal Ibrahim Alam Shah, husband's maternal cousin.

On 13 July 2019, she gave birth to her first daughter named Her Highness Tengku Kamiliah Zanariah Ruby Ehsan Putri.

On 17 June 2023, she gave birth to her second daughter named Her Highness Tengku Saidatul'Ihsan Zabedah Fauziah Putri.

On 10 October 2026, she gave birth to her first son named His Highness Tengku Ismail Iskandar.

== Filmography ==
=== Film ===
Year	Title	Role	Notes	Streaming On
2008	KAMI The Movie	Sofie	Debut films	
2010	Hooperz	Nino		
2011	Hantu Bonceng	Maya/Ayu		
2012	Mael Lambong	Maria		
2012	Adik Manja Returns	Su		
2013	KIL	Gadis Bunuh Diri (The Girl Who Committed Suicide)		Netflix
2013	Dampak	Hana		
2016	Aliff Dalam 7 Dimensi	Anna		
2017	The Secret Life of Pets	Katie	Malay dub	
2017	Mendidih Bro	Suraya		
2018	Pulang	Alia		Netflix
2019	Bella & Jamie	Jamie		
2021	Sa Balik Baju	Myra		Netflix
2022	Cikgu vs Hantu	Cikgu Shima		

=== TV series ===
Year	Title	Role	TV Network	Notes
2007	KAMI - The Series	Sofie	8TV	
2008	Kasut Tumit Tinggi	Mai	Astro Prima	
2009	Ghost (Season 2)	Lydia	8TV	
2010	Sayang Cendana	Cendana	TV3	
2010	Cornetto Inikah Cinta?	Juliana	Astro Ria	
2011	Natrah	Natrah	Astro Citra	
2011	Waktu Rehat (Season 2)	Azza	Disney Channel	Episod: "Gosip"
2015	Oh My English!: Class of 2015	Taylor Marie Smith	Astro TVIQ	
2016	Rumi & Jawi	Elly	Astro Prima	
2016	Oh My English! After School	Taylor Marie Smith	Astro TVIQ	
2017	Mata Cinta	Matahari	Astro Gempak	Web drama
2018	Split TV Series	Meen	Astro Citra	
2019	Mimpi Sabrina	Sabrina	TV3	
2020	Degup Cinta	Jasmin	Astro Ria	
2021	Dukun Diva	Che Yah / Rubiah Samsudin	Astro Citra	
2022	Epilog 3 Naga	Natasha	Awesome TV	
2024	Si Jantung Hati		Astro Ria	

2025 Impiana Fasha Sooka

=== Television films ===
Year	Title	Role	TV Network
2009	Puaka Topeng Putih		Astro Ria
2009	Cinta Lelong		Astro Ria
2009	2nd Hand Henfon		Astro Warna
2010	Sabar	Ramona	TV3
2011	Puteri Kayangan		TV3
2012	Puteri Pulau Tuba		TV2
2013	NY Cinta		Astro First Exclusive
2016	Oh My English!: Oh My Ganu! 2	Taylor Marie Smith	Astro TVIQ
2017	Hisyam dan 3 Hantutiyers		Astro Citra
2018	Miss & Mrs	Airin	ntv7
2018	Vivi Si Perigi	Irene	ntv7

=== Television ===
Year	TV show	TV channel
2001–2002	E-Zone	Astro Ria
2004	Majalah Moral	Astro TVIQ
2006	Bintang Kecil Raya	TV9
2008	Remaja	TV3
2009	Gadis Melayu	TV9
2010	Era TV	Astro Ria

== Awards and nominations ==
Year	Award	Category	Result
2009	Anugerah Bintang Popular Berita Harian 2008	Pengacara TV Wanita Popular	Nominated
2010	FHM 100 Most Wanted Women In The World 2010	—N/a	Won
2022	NONA Superwoman Award 2022	NONA Beauty Award	Won
