= Kuala Langat North Forest Reserve =

Forest preserve in Malaysia

The Kuala Langat North Forest Reserve (KLNFR) is a 957.6 ha protected peat swamp forest in the Kuala Langat District of Selangor, Malaysia. Some forests within the reserve are 8,000 years old. The reserve is used by some members of the indigenous Temuan people.

First gazetted in 1927 with an area of 7,246.96 ha, the reserve has shrunk since then, with land around it developed into housing and agricultural areas. Proposals to degazette the majority of the park occurred in 2020 and 2021, and much of the park was degazetted in 2021. However this action was reversed amid widespread opposition.

== History ==
The reserve was first gazetted in 1927. At the time, it had an area of 7,246.96 ha. Members of the Temuan people (an Orang Asli group) have reportedly used the forest since 1886.

In 1993, a Temuan community was relocated near the reserve, to a village called Busut Baru, as their former land was used to build Kuala Lumpur International Airport. 404.7 ha of land was promised in compensation, although it was not delivered at the time.

On 5 February 2020, the Selangor Forestry Department announced a proposal to degazette the park. Under this plan, 940 ha, or 97% of the reserve, would be degazetted. Selangor Menteri Besar (First Minister) Amirudin Shari, a member of the Pakatan Harapan (PH) coalition, claimed that the area posed a fire risk.

In March, Amirudin announced that two companies had proposed degazetting the reserve. Public hearings in September that year generated 45,423 objections. A private member motion by PH lawmaker Najwan Halimi led to the Selangor State Legislative Assembly voting down the proposal unanimously. One of the companies involved was owned by members of the Selangor royal family, including Crown Prince Tengku Amir Shah. The second company was owned by the state, with Amirudin sitting on its board of directors.

However, the Selangor State Executive Council proceeded with the plans, despite the PH coalition manifesto including reforestation and conservation. On 12 April 2021, the government announced it was continuing to consult on the matter. On 5 May 2020, the area was degazetted, and this decision was confirmed on 19 May 2020, although the information was not made public. 536.7 ha of the remaining 957.6 ha of the park (54%) was degazetted, with plans to convert it into mixed development. The private company Gabungan Indah Sdn. Bhd. was allocated 494.7 ha, of which most was slated to become housing. Gabungan Indah Sdn. Bhd. had been incorporated on 2 November 2020. According to the government, the original proposal was for 931.17 ha to be degazetted.

Selangor requires public hearings for the degazetting of any forest reserves. The degazetting was made public information on 30 August. 2020 Opposition lawmakers, as well as PH backbenchers, protested. Executive Council member Hee Loy Sian stated that the forest in question had been degraded by fire, and that three other forest areas totalling 581.8 ha would be gazetted to compensate. Civil opposition emerged under the Pertahankan Hutan Simpan Kuala Langat Utara group, which had formed in 2020 following the initial proposals. This group published images of the supposedly degraded forest areas, and obtained statements from Orang asli leaders in the area that noted the forests use by these communities. Tengku Amir Shah publicly rejected links to the project. The federal government also announced its opposition. Facing continued opposition from lawmakers, as well as the public, the Selangaor government cancelled its plans to develop the park, including the sale to Gabungan Indah Sdn. Bhd., on 8 September 2020.

The government announced that it would regazette the majority of land, with 42.1 ha set aside to give to the community in Busut Baru. The possibility remained that some land would also be set aside to build the MRL East Coast Rail Link, however on 2 December 2020 the government chose a route which did not pass through the reserve. The new forest reserves that had been established to replace the degazetted forest remained in place as well.

== Geography ==
The park totals 957.6 ha, 13% of its original size. The areas surrounding the park include housing developments, agricultural areas, and Temuan villages. The traditional burial grounds of the Temuan villages are located within the reserve.

== Wildlife ==
The forests of the reserve are old growth forests, some as old as 8,000 years. Much of it is peat swamp forest. Flora in the park includes Rubroshorea leprosula and Shorea uliginosa. Large fauna includes Malayan sun bears, black panthers, clouded leopards, and Malayan tapirs. Fish include the endemic Langat red fighting fish.

There are at least five squirrel species: slender squirrels, three-striped ground squirrels, shrew-faced squirrels, plantain squirrels, and the endemic Selangor pygmy flying squirrel. Two rodents have been identified, Müller's giant Sunda rats and Malayan field rats. Bat species include the lesser short-nosed fruit bat and the trefoil horseshoe bat.

A study in 2020 found 19 species of birds.

Forest crested lizards and oriental garden lizards have been found in the reserve, as well as reticulated pythons. Five species of frogs have been identified.
