= Tengku Sulaiman Shah =

Malaysian royal (born 1950)

Tengku Sulaiman Shah تڨكو سليمان شاه
- Tengku Laksamana of Selangor
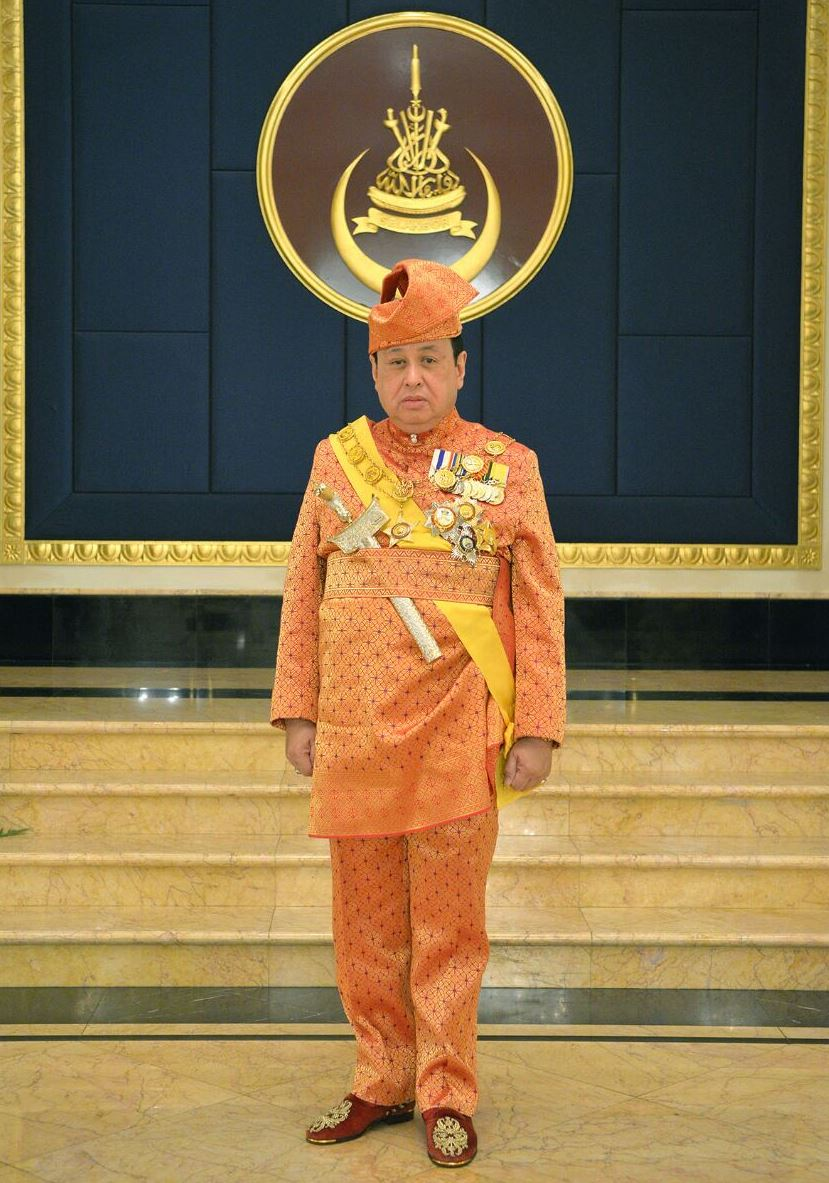
- Born: 17 June 1950 (age 76); Istana Raja Muda Selangor, Kampung Baru, Kuala Lumpur, Selangor, Federation of Malaya (now in present-day Kuala Lumpur, Malaysia)
- Spouse: Tunku Puteri Kamariah Aminah Maimunah Iskandariah binti Al-Marhum Sultan Iskandar (m. 1977; div. 2023)
- Issue: Tengku Shakirinal Shah (1980); Tengku Salehuddin Shah (1982) (Tengku Indera Bijaya Diraja of Selangor); Tengku Shahrain Shah (1985); Tengku Shariffuddin Shah (1987); Tengku Puteri Kathira (1990)
Names
- Tengku Sulaiman Shah Alhaj ibni Almarhum Sultan Salahuddin Abdul Aziz Shah Alhaj
- House: Opu Daeng Chelak
- Father: Sultan Salahuddin Abdul Aziz Shah ibni Almarhum Sultan Hisamuddin Alam Shah
- Mother: Paduka Bonda Raja Selangor Raja Saidatul Ihsan binti Raja Bendahara Badar Shah
- Religion: Sunni Islam

Tengku Sulaiman Shah (Jawi: تڠكو سليمان شاه الحاج ابن المرحوم سلطان صلاح الدين عبدالعزيز شاه الحاج; born 17 June 1950) is a Malaysian corporate figure and member of the Selangor royal family. He is the second son of the 8th Sultan, Sultan Salahuddin Abdul Aziz Shah Al-Haj and the brother of the 9th and current Sultan, Sultan Sharafuddin Idris Shah Al-Haj. Currently, he is second-in-line to throne of Selangor after his nephew, Tengku Amir Shah.

== Biography ==
Tengku Sulaiman Shah was born on 1 Ramadhan 1369 Hijrah (the first day of the holy Islamic month of Ramadan), corresponding to 17 June 1950 of the Gregorian calendar at the Istana Raja Muda Selangor in Kampung Baru, Kuala Lumpur which was the then-state capital of Selangor. He is the fourth child and second son of the then-Raja Muda (Crown Prince) of Selangor, Tengku Abdul Aziz Shah (1926–2001) and his first wife, YMM Raja Saidatul Ihsan binti Almarhum Tengku Badar Shah (Paduka Bonda Raja Selangor) (1923–2011). He was educated in Pakistan and the United Kingdom, at Wellingborough School, Northamptonshire. His father became the Sultan of Selangor on 1 September 1960, after the death of his grandfather, Almarhum Sultan Hisamuddin Alam Shah Al-Haj while serving as the second Yang di-Pertuan Agong and becoming Sultan Salahuddin Abdul Aziz Shah.

On 15 January 1972, his father, the then-Sultan of Selangor, Sultan Salahuddin Abdul Aziz Shah Al-Haj appointed Tengku Sulaiman Shah Al-Haj as the Tengku Panglima Besar and held the post for six years. On 1 August 1978, his father raised the rank of Tengku Sulaiman Shah Al-Haj to Tengku Panglima Diraja and held the post for 38 years.

On 1 July 2016, his elder brother, the incumbent Sultan of Selangor, Sultan Sharafuddin Idris Shah Al-Haj, promoted Tengku Sulaiman Shah Al-Haj to Tengku Laksamana of Selangor. He is also a member of The Council of the Royal Court of Selangor (Dewan Diraja Selangor).

Tengku Sulaiman Shah returned to Malaysia in 1970. In 1971, Sultan Salahuddin Abdul Aziz Shah Al-Haj required him to work with the international advertising company SH Benson Sdn Bhd (later renamed as Ogilvy Benson & Mather (OBM) Sdn Bhd and latest Ogilvy & Mather Sdn Bhd). He was attached in Audio Visual department and gained wide knowledge in the advertising and branding industry. In 1975, he left the company and began venturing into the construction sector. He and other partners founded Syarikat Pembinaan Setia Sdn Bhd which later known as S P Setia a public listed company in the main board. In 1997, he relinquished his stake in the company. Tengku Sulaiman Shah was formerly a Director of the following public listed companies: 1. Malaysian Resources Corporation Berhad (MRCB), 2. Samanda Holding Berhad, 3. MCB Holding Berhad, 4. SIME UEP, 5. Bina Goodyear Berhad, 6. Baneng Holding Berhad, 7. KFC Holding (Malaysia) Berhad, 8. QSR Brands Bhd. As of 2021 he is the Director at Goodway Integrated Industries Berhad (GIIB), WTK Holding Berhad and LLC Berhad. Tengku Sulaiman Shah is the Chairman of Malaysia - UAE Business Council appointed by Ministry of International Trade and Industry (Malaysia) (MITI).

Tengku Sulaiman Shah Al-Haj's interests includes photography and travelling. He is a food lover, particular to Middle Eastern, Japanese, and Western foods.

== Personal life ==
On 2 May 1977, he married Tunku Puteri Kamariah Aminah Maimunah Iskandariah (born 11 July 1956), the eldest daughter of the late Sultan of Johor, Sultan Iskandar and also eldest sister of the current Sultan of Johor, Sultan Ibrahim. In 1982, she was conferred the title of Tunku Puteri Johor by her father. They have 5 children together. Their youngest son, Tengku Shariffuddin Shah, married celebrity Juliana Evans in 2017.

== Honours ==
=== Honours of Selangor ===
- Selangor
  - Second Class of the Royal Family Order of Selangor (DK II) (10 April 2003)
  - Knight Grand Commander of the Order of the Crown of Selangor (SPMS) – Dato' Seri (8 March 1983)
  - Sultan Sharafuddin Coronation Medal (8 March 2003)
  - Sultan Salahuddin Coronation Medal (28 June 1961)
  - Sultan Salahuddin Silver Jubilee Medal (3 September 1985)
  - Sultan Sharafuddin Silver Jubilee Medal (25 October 2026)

=== Honours of Malaysia ===
- Malaysia
  - Recipient of the 8th Yang di-Pertuan Agong Installation Medal (15 November 1984)
  - Recipient of the 11th Yang di-Pertuan Agong Installation Medal (23 September 1999)
  - Recipient of the 16th Yang di-Pertuan Agong Installation Medal (30 July 2019)
- Johor
  - First Class of the Royal Family Order of Johor (DK I) (22 November 2013)
  - Second Class of the Royal Family Order of Johor (DK II) (8 April 1984)
  - Knight Grand Commander of the Order of the Crown of Johor (SPMJ) – Dato'
  - Recipient of the Sultan Ibrahim Coronation Medal (23 March 2015)
- Kelantan
  - Knight Grand Commander of the Order of the Life of the Crown of Kelantan (SJMK) – Dato' (30 March 1986)
  - Recipient of the Sultan Ismail Petra Coronation Medal (30 March 1980)
- Perak
  - Recipient of the Sultan Nazrin Shah Installation Medal (6 May 2015)

Malaysian royalty
First Tengku Amir Shah	Line of succession to the throne of Selangor; 2nd position	Succeeded by Tengku Shakirinal Amin Mahmud Ismail Ahmad Shah bin Tengku Sulaiman Shah
