= Alice Smith School =

Private British international school in Kuala Lumpur, Malaysia

The Alice Smith School

Location
- 2 Jalan Bellamy, 50460 Kuala Lumpur, Malaysia.

Information
- Type: Private British International School
- Motto: Latin: Sic Itur Ad Astra (In this way we shall reach the stars)
- Established: 1946
- Founder: Alice Fairfield-Smith
- Head of School: Dr John Knight
- Gender: Coeducational
- Age: 3 to 18
- Enrolment: ~800 Secondary School; ~700 Primary School
- Houses: Scott; Fairfield; Muir; Fleming
- Colours: Green and Red
- Affiliations: Federation of British International Schools in Asia, Council of British International Schools, Council of International Schools
- Abbreviation: KLASS
- Tuition: RM 17,910-40,790 per term
- Website: www.alice-smith.edu.my

The Alice Smith School is a private coeducational British International School in Kuala Lumpur, Malaysia.

Founded in 1946, it is the oldest British international school in Malaysia. The school is a not-for-profit educational institution situated on two campuses. The Primary Campus that teaches from Preschool to Year 6 is on Jalan Bellamy in Kuala Lumpur and the Secondary Campus which provides Year 7 to Year 13 on Jalan Equine in Seri Kembangan, Selangor.

The Alice Smith School is a member of the Federation of British International Schools in Asia, and the Council of International Schools. It is also a member of the South East Asia Student Activities Conference and Association of International Schools in Malaysia (AIMS). It is accredited as fully compliant by the Council of British International Schools, and received British School Overseas accreditation in 2011 and 2014 from the British Department for Education.

The school offers the National Curriculum for England in Primary and Secondary School. It offers GCSE, IGCSE, and A-Level Options from Edexcel, Cambridge Assessments, and AQA.

It has been a finalist in the 2019, 2022 and 2023 COBIS International Schools Awards and 2021 winner. The school was a finalist for TES International School of the Year 2025 and Finalist for the Independent School of the Year award for British International School of the Year in 2026. It has also been shortlisted by the Daily Telegraph's Independent Schools of the Year Awards in 2020, 2021 and 2022.

The school was ranked as one of the Top Fifteen Schools in China & Southeast Asia one of the top 100 schools in the world by the Carfax Education and Spears' Schools Index from 2022-2026.

== History ==
The school was started in 1946 by Alice Fairfield-Smith at her home on Jalan Eaton, Kuala Lumpur at the end of the Second World War in order to educate the community of British colonial expatriates. She was a biology graduate from Harvard University.

Subsequently, the school rented the Masonic Hall on Damansara Road and later also used St Andrew's Church from 1951 to 1963 for the preschool. When Alice Smith left in 1950, the school formally incorporated. The school relocated behind the old National Palace on Jalan Bellamy in May 1955.

The school's 25-acre secondary campus was opened by Prince Edward in Equine Park, Seri Kembangan, Selangor in September 1998.

The primary school's Jubilee Centre was also awarded GOLD by the Malaysian Architectural Awards, and was opened by Prince Andrew, Duke of York.

== Facilities ==
The secondary school has a 50m, 10 lane Olympic swimming pool, as well as an 8-lane IAAF accredited running track.

== Notable alumni ==
- Tan Sri Tony Fernandes, founder of AirAsia
- Tengku Zatashah binti Sultan Sharafuddin Idris Shah, Selangor Royal
- Tengku Amir Shah, Crown Prince of Selangor
- Sultan Muhammad V, former Yang di-Pertuan Agong of Malaysia and Sultan of Kelantan
- Tengku Muhammad Fa-iz Petra, former Crown Prince of Kelantan
- Tunku Ali Redhauddin, Tunku Besar of Seri Menanti, Negeri Sembilan
- Tunku Zain Al-'Abidin, Negeri Sembilan Royal
- Raja Azlan Muzzaffar Shah, Perak Royal
- Hishammuddin Hussein, former minister and politician
- Nazir Razak, Chairman of CIMB
- Ryan Grant (rugby union), British and Irish Lions
- Ben Proud, Silver Medalist Olympic swimmer
- Gemma Calvert, British Neuroscientist
- Raja Petra Kamarudin, Selangor Royal and political figure
- Niamh Walsh, actress
- Caroline Russell, CEO of BOH Plantations

== See also ==
- Federation of British International Schools in Asia
