= Tengku Amir Shah =

Crown Prince of Selangor (born 1990)

Tengku Amir Shah تڠكو أمير شاه
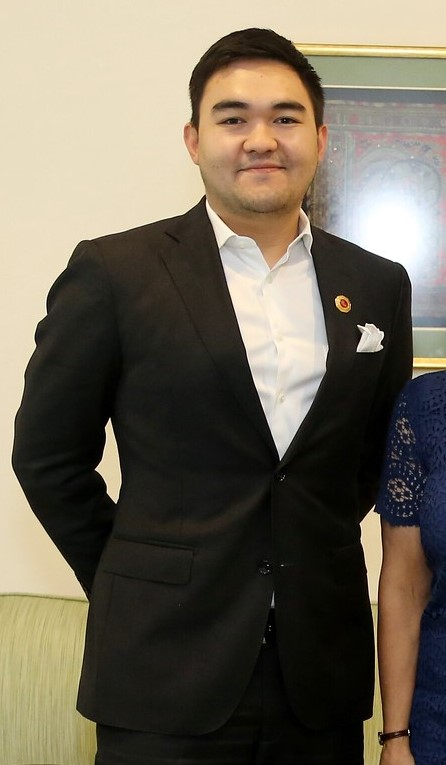

Raja Muda of Selangor
- Proclaimed: 3 May 2002 – present
- Installation: 8 October 2016
- Predecessor: Tengku Idris Shah
- Born: 12 December 1990 (age 35); California Pacific Medical Center, San Francisco, California, United States
- Spouse: Afzaa Fadini Abdul Aziz (m. 2025)
- Issue: Tengku Alia Amira
Names
- Tengku Amir Shah ibni Sultan Sharafuddin Idris Shah Alhaj
- House: Opu Daeng Chelak
- Father: Sultan Sharafuddin Idris Shah Alhaj Ibni Almarhum Sultan Salahuddin Abdul Aziz Alhaj
- Mother: Puan Nur Lisa Idris Binti Abdullah (née Lisa Davis)
- Religion: Sunni Islam
- Occupation: Military
- Military career
- Allegiance: Malaysia
- Branch: Royal Malaysian Navy; Malaysian Army
- Service years: 2025–present 2014–2025
- Rank: See list
- Units: 17th Battalion (Parachute), Royal Malay Regiment; Royal Malaysian Naval Volunteer Reserve
- Commands: Assault Pioneer 'Rintis Serang (RINSER)' Platoon

Tengku Amir Shah ibni Sultan Sharafuddin Idris Shah Alhaj (Jawi: تڠکو أمير شاه ابن سلطان شرف الدين إدريس شاه الحاج; born 12 December 1990) is a member of the Selangor royal family who is the Raja Muda (Crown Prince) of Selangor and heir apparent to the Selangor throne. He is the youngest child and only son of Sultan Sharafuddin of Selangor.

== Early life ==
Tengku Amir was born on 12 December 1990 at California Pacific Medical Center in San Francisco, as the third child and first son of the then Raja Muda of Selangor, Tengku Idris Shah. His mother, Puan Nur Lisa Idris Abdullah (born Lisa Davis), was born in the United States. As such, he has half American ancestry. He has two elder paternal half-sisters, Tengku Zerafina and Tengku Zatashah.

On 3 May 2002, aged 11, Tengku Amir was proclaimed Raja Muda of Selangor. He was formally installed on 8 October 2016 at Istana Alam Shah, Klang.

== Education ==
Tengku Amir received his primary education at Alice Smith School, Kuala Lumpur. He then attended Wellington College in the United Kingdom and graduated in 2009. Tengku Amir graduated from the University of Leeds with a Bachelor's of Science Degree in Ecology and Environmental Biology in 2014. He also completed the Transformational Leadership Fellowship at the Blavatnik School of Government, University of Oxford in 2025.

== Military career ==
In late 2014, pictures of Tengku Amir wearing military uniform were leaked and went viral. It was later confirmed that he was enrolling into Officers Cadet School in Port Dickson, Negeri Sembilan to pursue a military career. He enrolled in Royal Military Academy Sandhurst, Camberley, Surrey on 3 May 2015. He attended the Commissioning Course Intake 152 and graduated on 15 April 2016.

Tengku Amir was commissioned as a Second Lieutenant (Leftenan Muda) in the 17th Battalion Royal Malay Regiment (Para), a regiment of the 10th Parachute Brigade in Malaysian Army in a ceremony on 19 July 2016, which was held at Terendak Camp, Malacca. When asked why he chose to join Malaysian Army instead of following in his father's footstep by joining Malaysian Navy, he said that he was attracted to the challenge offered by the army which demanded strong physical and mental endurance.

Tengku Amir attended and passed the Basic Rapid Deployment Force Course (APAC) Series 2/2016, which was held from 5 September until 2 October 2016. He is the only member of the royal family who had done so. He received the maroon beret and parachutist badge on 15 March 2017. He was promoted to Lieutenant on 15 April 2017, and later Captain on 19 November 2020 after taking promotion examinations between July and September 2020. However, his rank conferment ceremony was delayed to 8 March 2021 due to the COVID-19 pandemic.

== Installation as the Raja Muda of Selangor ==
Tengku Amir was formally installed as the crown prince in 2016, at the age of 26. His installation ceremony was held in two parts, one week apart.

The first part was held on 8 October 2016 at the Balairung Seri, Istana Alam Shah, Klang. In the ceremony, Tengku Amir took the oath as Crown Prince in front of his father, the Sultan and the queen consort, Tengku Permaisuri Norashikin. Tengku Amir also signed the decree witnessed by his uncle, the Tengku Laksamana of Selangor, Tengku Sulaiman Shah, Shah Alam High Court judge, Datuk Mohamad Zabidin Mohd Diah and Selangor state secretary, Datuk Mohd Amin Ahmad Ahya.

Then, Sharafuddin of Selangor presented a royal regalia, the Crown Prince of Selangor's Most Illustrious Kris (Malay: Keris Kebesaran Yang Amat Mulia Raja Muda Selangor) to Tengku Amir, symbolising him being officially installed as the Crown Prince of Selangor.

The ceremony was also attended by his half-sister, Tengku Zatashah and her husband, Aubry Mennesson, and the fellow members of the royal family, the then Defence Minister, Hishammuddin Hussein and wife, Tengku Marsilla Tengku Abdullah, Urban Wellbeing, Housing and Local Government Minister Noh Omar, Menteri Besar of Selangor, Azmin Ali, inspector-general of police, Khalid Abu Bakar, Malaysian Army chief general, Zulkifeli Mohd Zin, Selangor State Executive Council members, state assembly persons and government officers. It ended with prayer led by Selangor mufti, Mohd Tamyes Abdul Wahid. As per tradition, he then set out for a seven days travel outside the state.

Tengku Amir returned on the 15 October 2016. The returning ceremony was called Istiadat Menghadap dan Menjunjung Duli (Greet and serve the king ceremony) and was also held at the Balairung Seri, Istana Alam Shah.

Tengku Laksamana Selangor and the sons of the nobles, accompanied by Tengku Paduka Shah Bandar to Balairung Seri, were present at the ceremony. Tengku Paduka Shah Bandar also brought and laid the Quran on the table at the throne accompanied by Tengku Setia. Sharafuddin of Selangor and Tengku Permaisuri Norashikin then arrived with Tengku Laksamana Selangor as Head of the Royal Customs of Selangor leading, Engku Seri Perdana carrying the kris and Tengku Panglima Besar Selangor.

Tengku Amir walked in to Balairung Seri while holding the kris given by the Sultan earlier in the week. Then, he presented a few souvenir and gifts to his father. After the Sultan accepted his gifts, Tengku Amir took his seat at the Raja Muda throne.

Tengku Amir was also congratulated by Tengku Indera Setia Selangor, Tengku Ahmad Shah Ibni Almarhum Sultan Salahuddin Abdul Aziz Shah, who represented the other heirs and royal family members, and members of the Selangor Council of the Royal Court. Selangor mufti, Datuk Mohd Tamyes Abdul Wahid again led the prayer at the end of the ceremony.

== Royal duties ==
One of his official duties include welcoming the newly elected Yang di-Pertuan Agong and Raja Permaisuri Agong upon their arrival at Kuala Lumpur International Airport (KLIA) for their oath swearing ceremony. This is because despite its name, the airport is located in Sepang, which is in Selangor.

He welcomed the arrival of Muhammad V of Kelantan on 13 December 2016 upon his arrival at Kompleks Bunga Raya, KLIA. Muhammad V took a flight from Kota Bharu, Kelantan for his swearing in ceremony as the fifteenth Yang-di Pertuan Agong. He also welcomed the arrival of Abdullah of Pahang and his queen consort, Tunku Azizah Aminah Maimunah for the Sultan's oath swearing ceremony as the sixteenth Yang di-Pertuan Agong when they arrived at KLIA on 31 January 2019, after taking a flight from Kuantan, Pahang.

Tengku Amir attended the 2018 Warrior's Day celebration in Selangor with his father at Selangor Memorial Monument on 31 July 2018. He laid wreaths and paid homage to Malaysian fallen heroes during the event.

He made official visits to different area of Selangor as part of his duties as Raja Muda Selangor. In March 2019, he visited the district Kuala Langat with several members of Selangor royal family for three days. There, he visited a few landmarks such as Muzium Insitu, Mount Jugra and Istana Bandar. He climbed Mount Nuang and officiated the re-opening of its hiking track. He also summited Mount Kilimanjaro for charity, raising funds for the Raja Tun Uda library for better accessibility for the hearing impaired. On 11 September 2019, he visited the district Sabak Bernam for three days, making stops at local attraction such as the beach at Bagan Nakhoda Omar and paddy field at Parit 14 Sungai Panjang among others.

Tengku Amir has been the Pro-chancellor of Universiti Putra Malaysia since 18 October 2021.

== Marriage and children ==
On 22 September 2025, the Selangor palace announced that Tengku Amir would marry Cik Afzaa Fadini binti Dato' Abdul Aziz on 2 October. The royal wedding ceremony was held at the Masjid Istana Diraja, Istana Alam Shah on the morning of 2 October 2025. The solemnization was officiated by Selangor's mufti, Dato' Setia Dr Anhar Opir, while the Tengku Panglima Raja of Selangor, Tengku Ahmad Shah and the Tengku Indera Pahlawan Diraja, Tengku Putra acted as witnesses. Upon marriage, the bride was conferred with Order of the Crown of Selangor in first class (S.P.M.S.) by Sharafuddin of Selangor, making her official title Yang Mulia Datin Paduka Seri Afzaa Fadini binti Dato’ Abdul Aziz.

A wedding reception took place at Balairung Seri, Istana Alam Shah on the evening of 22 October 2025. The event started at 7:30 p.m. with the arrival of the Sultan and his queen consort, the Tengku Permaisuri. It was followed by the entrance of the groom and bride accompanied by live music from Selangor Symphony Orchestra. They wore matching cream royal attires as they took their places at the throne for the bersanding ceremony. Then, the ceremonial blessing (Malay: merenjis) which involved sprinkling the couple with bunga rampai, a traditional Malay fragrant potpourri, and scented water was carried out by the Sultan and the Tengku Permaisuri, the groom's mother Puan Nur Lisa Idris Abdullah, the groom's paternal uncles, his two elder sisters and their spouses, and lastly the bride's parents, Dato' Abdul Aziz Mat and Datin Rosmawati Ismail. The event concluded with a prayer recitation led by the Selangor's mufti, before the guests proceeded to Balai Santapan Diraja for a royal banquet. The royal couple greeted the people at a festivity held to celebrate their wedding on 7 November 2025 at Dataran Kemerdekaan Shah Alam, Shah Alam.

On 21 July 2026, the couple welcomed their first child, a daughter, named Yang Mulia Tengku Alia Amira binti Tengku Amir Shah.

== Personal interests ==
=== Sports ===
Tengku Amir founded the amateur football competition, Selangor Champions League in 2016.

He is also well known to be a sports lover and enjoys playing golf and cycling among other things. He joined a 25 kilometers cycling program, Selangor Industrial Ride 1.0 on 30 July 2017. He also led the Selangor leg of the Kuala Lumpur torch run leading up to 2017 Southeast Asian Games. He joined a run to celebrate the opening of the third bridge of Klang on 17 December 2017. He participated in the "Family Fun Run" category, which involved running for five kilometres along the Raja Muda Nala bridge.

On 18 August 2019, he joined Shah Alam International Enduride, a 155 kilometers relaxing cycling program.

==== Selangor Football Club ====
Tengku Amir is the chairman of the football club, Selangor.

After facing four consecutive defeats in August 2016, the head coach of Selangor at the time, Zainal Abidin Hassan was fired from his position. An internal conflict arose in the football club management between the club president, Azmin Ali, who was also the Menteri Besar of Selangor, and the exco members regarding the compensation payment for the leaving coach, and the amount of money the Government of Selangor should allocate to the football club. The supporters of the club pushed for the president to resign, and voiced their support for Tengku Amir to take over as the club president.

On 23 December 2016, Tengku Amir made a statement on his instagram account, suggesting for Selangor to be revamped and for executive committee (EXCO) members who are involved in politics to step down from their post. On 30 December 2016, Azmin resigned from his position as the club president, stated that he "had made the decision to part ways with an organisation and management that is not authoritative and not committed to change for the sake of [returning] the glory of Selangor state football."

In another Instagram post posted in February 2017, Tengku Amir outlined seven steps that can be taken to revamp and rejuvenate the football team. In the statement, he also mentioned that although he was flattered by the support received by him from the people to take over Selangor, he believed that Selangor requires someone with more experience to lead the body. Subsequently, Subahan Kamal was unanimously voted as the new president in an extraordinary congress held on 23 February 2017. In an interview in March 2017, Tengku Amir stated that for the time being, he will remain as the royal patron of the football club. He cited his reason as that he was currently involved in a project called Football Selangor, where he is focusing on building the football community by introducing social leagues and community leagues through Selangor Youth Community. On 31 May 2018, the departing club president, Subahan Kamal confirmed that Tengku Amir will replace him as the football association's president after he left the sports body. He officially became the president of FA Selangor after receiving 81 nominations from 96 affiliates and won uncontested in the extraordinary congress that was held on 3 July 2018. He stated that his goal as the new president is to make Selangor self-sustaining and become a commercially viable club. He aimed for the club to be able to not rely on state funding in five years.

On 3 November 2018, a group of individuals called an Extraordinary Congress (EC) to elect new executive committee, citing that the appointment of several committee members are not lawful, including the position of several vice-presidents. The subsequent re-election showed total change in all posts, barring Tengku Amir who was re-elected as the president. However, Tengku Amir later declared that the EC was invalid since it does not followed the proper procedure. It was also held without his consent and was not recognised by him and the association. This was supported by the Football Association of Malaysia president, Hamidin Mohd Amin, who said that Tengku Amir is still the president of FAS and the congress was invalid as it was held without the president's consent. Tengku Amir called the rogue faction to meet him at the palace to voice out their displeasure but only less than half of them attended it. As a result, he removed 43 affiliate clubs from the association, stating that they no longer hold the same values and dreams as Selangor. The announcement was made through Selangor social media accounts on 15 December 2018.

Under his leadership, the football club underwent moderate transformation, such as the introduction of membership team cards and season passes to the club supporters in 2019. On 24 July 2019, he launched the opening of the new training centre and office complex, located at SUK Sports Complex, Section 5, Shah Alam. He launched the FAS Soccer School program on 29 September 2019. The program which involved five primary schools in Selangor is responsible for providing skilled coaches services, coaching courses, football equipment and games opportunities to students involved.

FA Selangor was privatised and renamed as Selangor F.C. on 2 October 2020. It is owned by Red Giants FC Sdn. Bhd., with Tengku Amir as the largest shareholder of the company.

=== Philanthropy and charity ===
Tengku Amir is a patron of a few charitable organisations, including Cheshire Home and the Raja Muda of Selangor Foundation (Yayasan Raja Muda Selangor) since 2003.

=== Selangor Youth Community ===
Selangor Youth Community (SAY) is a non-government organisation founded by Tengku Amir. In an exclusive interview with Berita Harian, the crown prince stated that he started the program as an initiative to approach the youth in Selangor and discover their interest.

On 20 November 2018, Tengku Amir launched SAY Ignite, a festival that aimed to celebrate and ignite youths through creative content and social activities such as debate, art showcase, kayak race, introduction to sailing classes, football, poetry recital and forums. It was held at Taman Tasik Shah Alam.

== Titles, styles and honours ==
Styles of Tengku Amir Shah
- Reference style: His Highness
- Spoken style: Your Highness
- Alternative style: Tuanku

The full title and style of Tengku Amir is:

His Highness Tengku Amir Shah Ibni Sultan Sharafuddin Idris Shah Alhaj, D.K., S.P.M.S., S.S.I.S., S.P.M.K., Grand Officer of the Order of Saint-Charles (Monaco), Raja Muda of Selangor

=== Military ranks ===
United Kingdom

- British Army
  - 3 May 2015: Officer Cadet

Malaysia

- Malaysian Army
  - 16 April 2016: Second Lieutenant, Malaysian Army
  - 15 April 2017: Lieutenant, 17th Battalion Royal Malay Regiment (PARA)
  - 19 November 2020: Captain, 17th Battalion Royal Malay Regiment (PARA)
- Royal Malaysian Navy
  - 19 November 2025: Lieutenant, Royal Malaysian Naval Volunteer Reserve
  - 24 February 2026: Lieutenant Commander, Royal Malaysian Naval Volunteer Reserve

=== Honours ===
==== Honours of Selangor ====
- First Class of the Royal Family Order of Selangor (DK I) (11 December 2016)
- Knight Grand Commander of the Order of the Crown of Selangor (SPMS) – Dato' Seri (11 December 2005)
- Knight Grand Companion of the Order of Sultan Sharafuddin Idris Shah (SSIS) – Dato' Setia (11 December 2010)
- Sultan Salahuddin Coronation Medal (12 December 1990)
- Sultan Salahuddin Silver Jubilee Medal (12 December 1990)
- Sultan Sharafuddin Coronation Medal First Class in Gold (8 March 2003)
- Sultan Sharafuddin Silver Jubilee Medal (25 October 2026)

==== Honours of Malaysia ====
- Malaysia
  - Recipient of the 11th Yang di-Pertuan Agong Installation Medal (23 September 1999)
- Kedah
  - Recipient of the Sultan Sallehuddin Installation Medal (22 October 2018)
- Kelantan
  - Knight Grand Commander of the Order of the Crown of Kelantan (SPMK) – Dato' (5 January 2011)
  - Recipient of the Sultan Ismail Petra Silver Jubilee Medal (30 March 2004)
- Negeri Sembilan
  - Recipient of the Tuanku Muhriz Installation Medal (26 October 2009)

==== Foreign honours ====
- Monaco
  - Grand Officer of the Order of Saint Charles (27 November 2023)

== Trivia ==
He was eligible for United States citizenship since he was born in the United States but since Malaysia does not allow dual citizenship, he is not an American citizen.

Lines of succession
| First Heir apparent | Line of succession to the throne of Selangor; 1st in line | Followed by Tengku Sulaiman Shah |
Malaysian royalty
| Previous: Tengku Idris Shah | Crown Prince of Selangor since 2002 | Incumbent |
