= Mael Lambong =

- Theatrical poster
- Directed by: Ahmad Idham
- Starring: Zizan Razak; Juliana Evans; Taiyuddin Bakar
- Distributed by: Excellent Pictures
- Release date: 21 June 2012
- Running time: 90 minutes
- Country: Malaysia
- Language: Malay
- Box office: MYR 4.88 million

Mael Lambong is a 2012 Malaysian Malay-language action comedy film directed by Ahmad Idham, starring Zizan Razak, Juliana Evans and Taiyuddin Bakar. This film aired on June 21, 2012 in all Malaysian cinema.

== Plot ==
Mael Lambong (Zizan Razak) is a well-known automobile repo man in Kuala Lumpur. His life begins to change and become chaotic when he meets Maria (Juliana Evans) who asks for his help to save her from criminals.

Their escape to save themselves brought Mael and Maria to Terengganu which is also Mael's hometown. Apparently, Mael has long left the land of his birth because of self-indulgence.

In the village, Mael meets Rozie (Shenthy Feliziana), his former lover who is now engaged to Tiger (Taiyudin Bakar). Conflict began to arise when Tiger did not like Mael's return because he was jealous of the relationship that had been established between Mael and Rozie before.

Criminals hunting Maria because they want the microchip containing the tender information of the government project can finally track them in Terengganu. What happened next?

== Cast ==
- Zizan Razak as Mael Lambong
- Juliana Evans as Maria
- Taiyuddin Bakar as Mat Tiger
- Shenty Feliziana as Rozie
- Azlan Komeng as villain
- Shuib Sepahtu as agent
- Sabri Yunus as chief agent

=== Cameo ===
- Dian P. Ramlee as Rozie's mom
- Aziz M. Osman as Businessman
- Dr. Ahmad Idham as Maria's Boss
- Siti Elizad as beautiful woman
