= Selangor Symphony Orchestra =

Professional orchestra based in Selangor, Malaysia

Selangor Symphony Orchestra (SSO)
- Orchestra
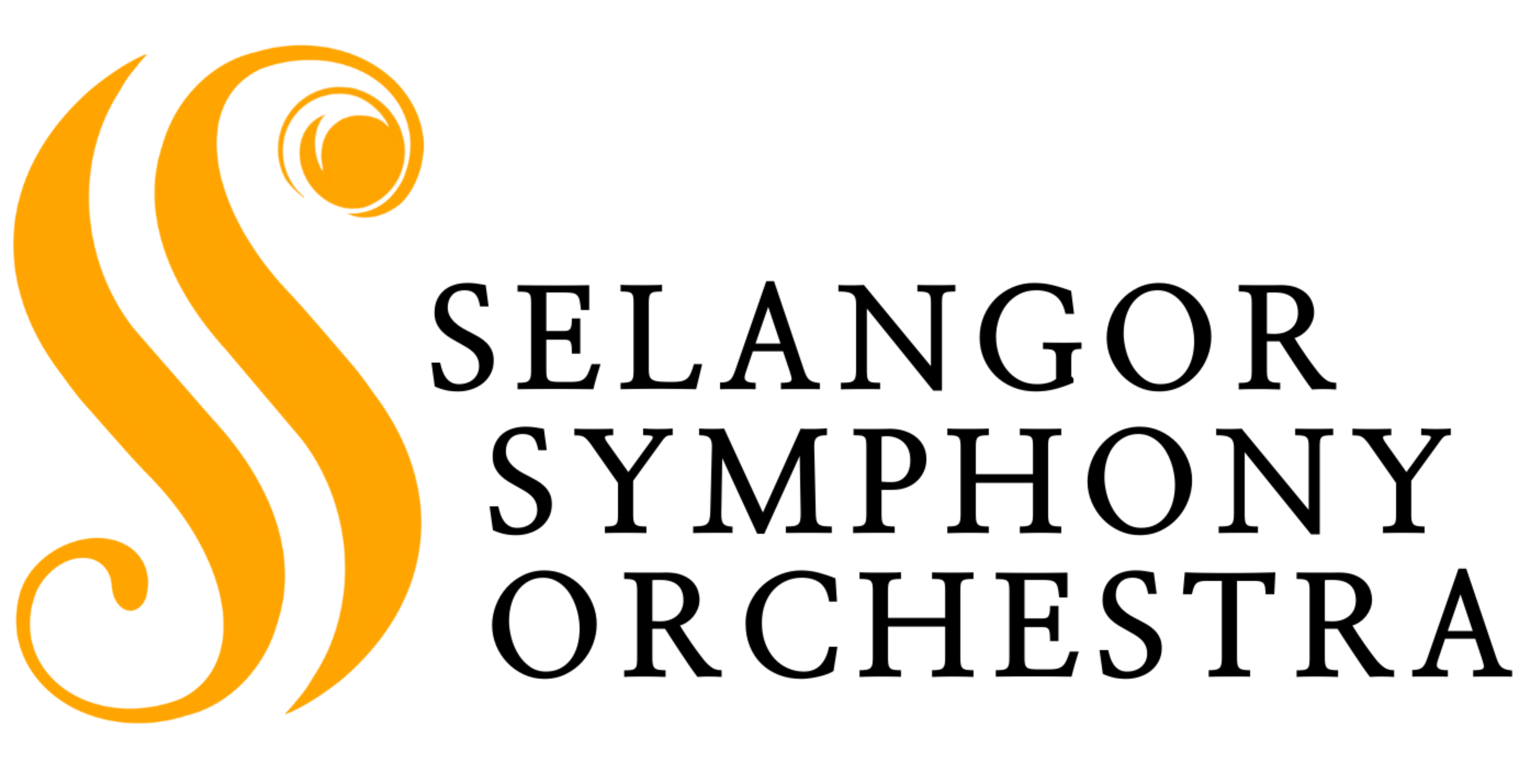
- Founded: 2015
- Location: Selangor, Malaysia
- Music director: Eugene Pook
- Website: https://www.sso.org.my/

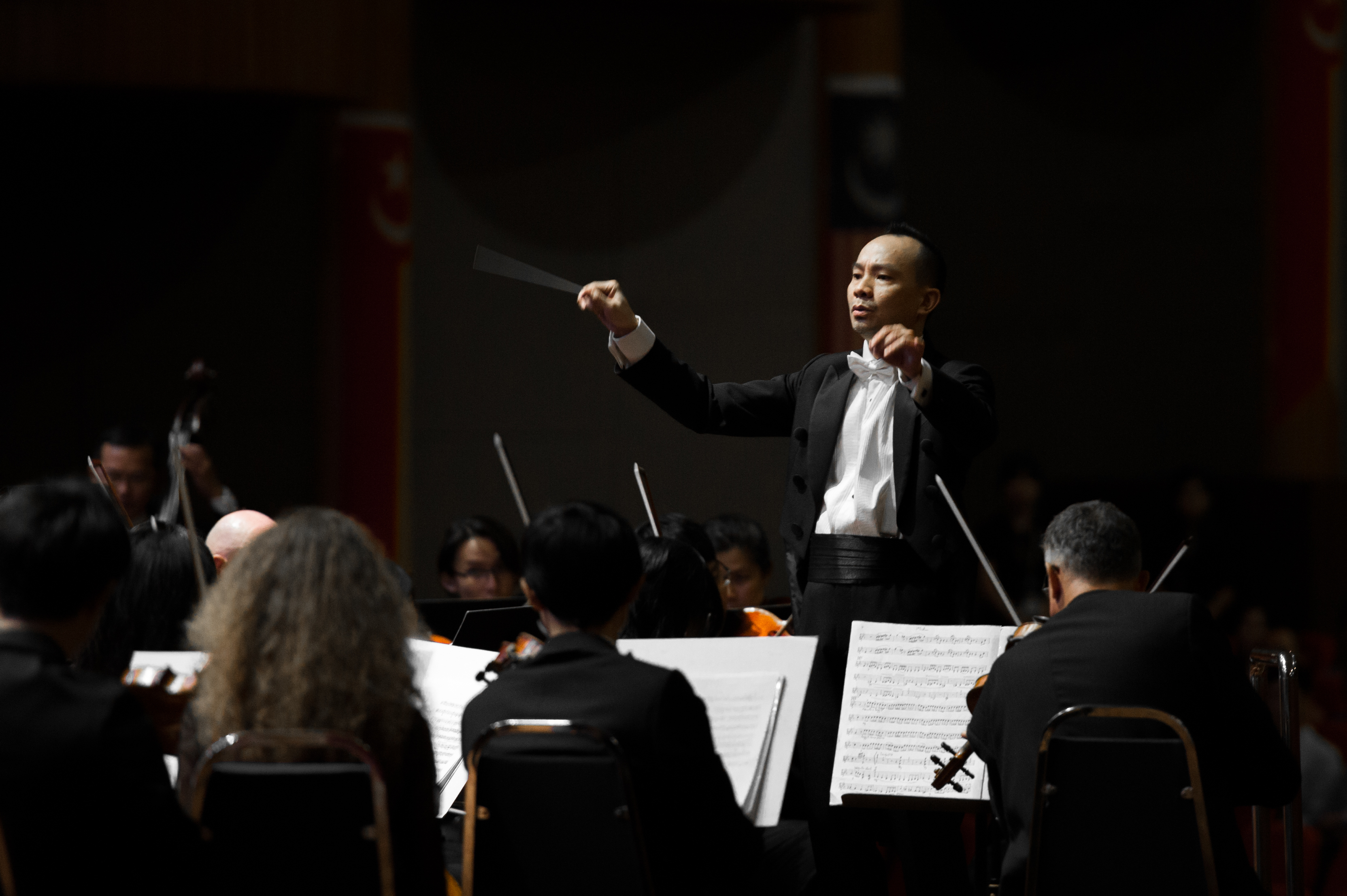

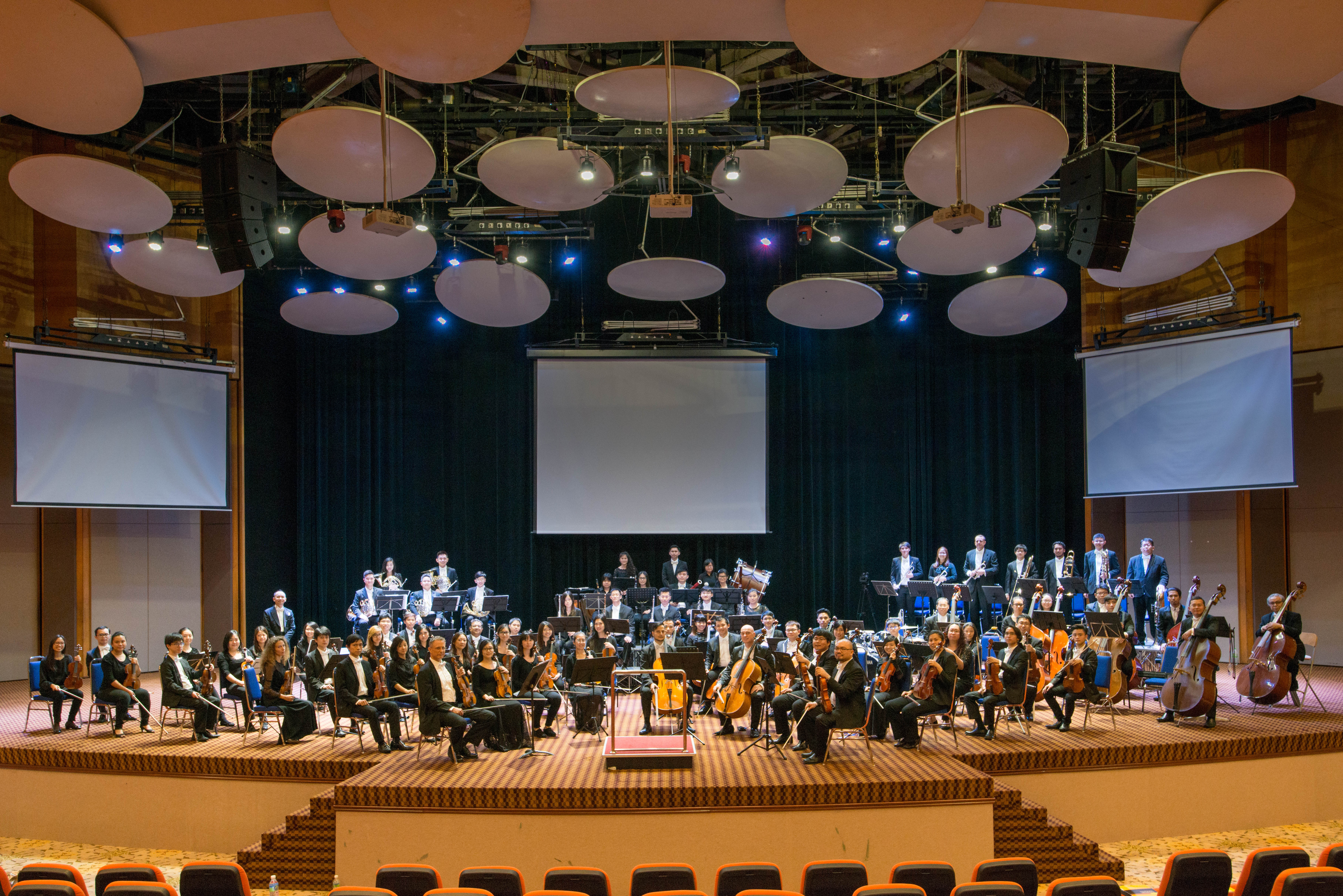

The Selangor Symphonic Orchestra (SSO) is a professional orchestra based in Selangor, Malaysia. SSO consists of around 50 contracted musicians and with majority of the musicians being Malaysians. The orchestra's founder and inaugural music director is conductor Eugene Pook. The SSO's youth orchestra, the Selangor Symphony Youth Orchestra (SSYO), offers weekly orchestra training programs for young musicians.

== History ==
The SSO was founded in 2015 by Pook to create a platform for local professional classical musicians to thrive in, and to promote the expansion of Malaysian classical music. The SSO was launched by its past royal patron Tengku Zatashah, Princess of Selangor, who aided the orchestra's funds through the Make-A-Wish Malaysia campaign at 2015.

The orchestra's inaugural concert took place at the Jubli Perak Auditorium, SUK Negeri Selangor on 21 November 2015, and featured violin soloist Zhang Le.

== Concerts and repertoire ==
Since its establishment, SSO has performed a total of 12 concerts, from a small 4-piece string quartet to a 50-piece full orchestra. Currently, all of the SSO concerts were held in various venues in Klang Valley. All music is selected by their music director and conductors. The orchestra's annual season calendar consists of full orchestra concerts, series of chamber music events, and programs for education and outreach.
