= Afzaa Fadini Abdul Aziz =

Consort of the Raja Muda of Selangor (born 1993)

Afzaa Fadini افزا فاديني
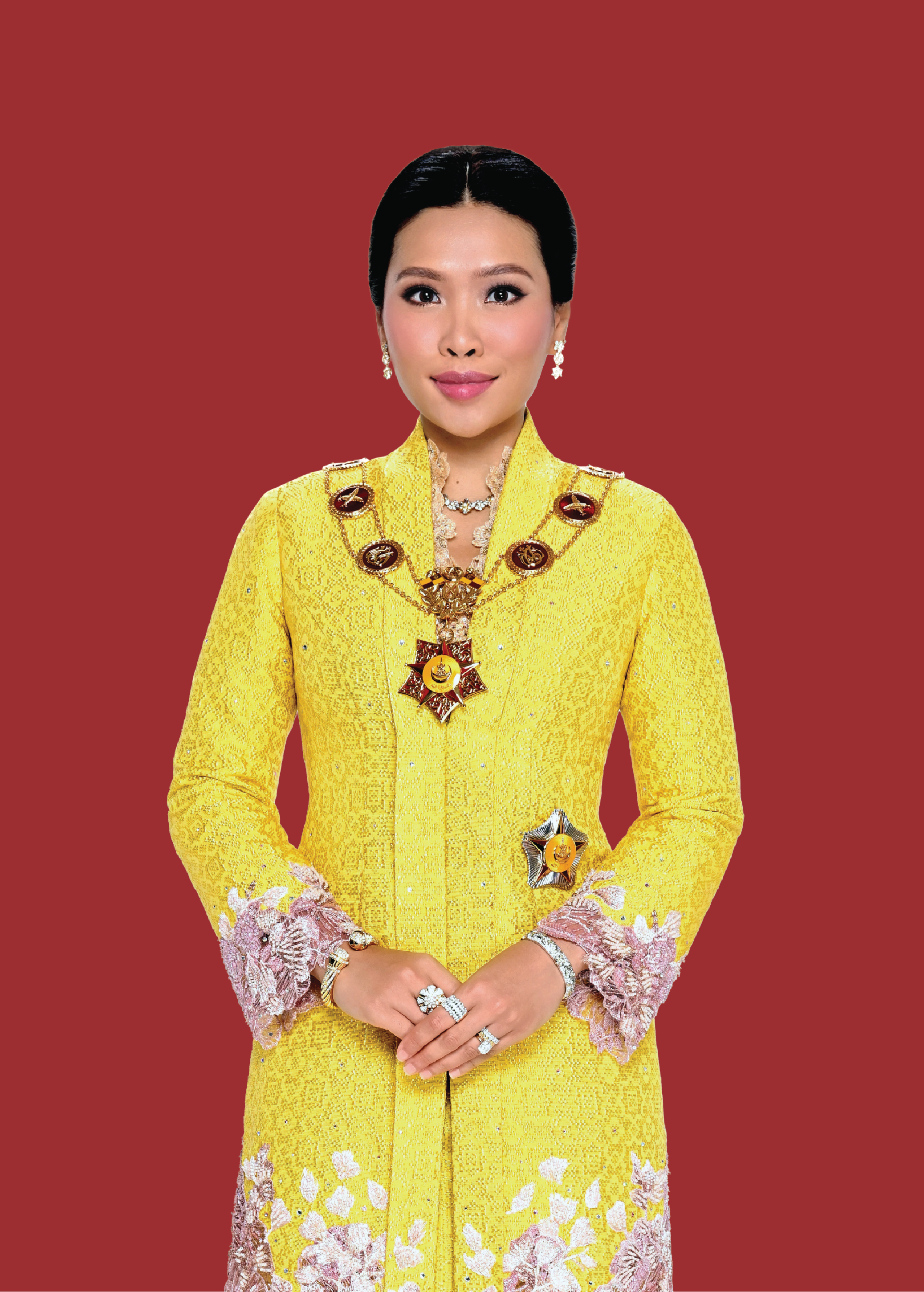

Consort of the Crown Prince of Selangor
- Reign: 2 October 2025 – present
- Predecessor: Puan Nur Lisa Idris binti Abdullah
- Born: Afzaa Fadini binti Abdul Aziz; 11 April 1993 (age 33); Pantai Hospital, Kuala Lumpur, Malaysia
- Spouse: Tengku Amir Shah (m. 2025)
- Issue: Tengku Alia Amira
Regnal name
- Datin Paduka Seri Afzaa Fadini binti Dato' Abdul Aziz
- House: Opu Daeng Chelak (by marriage)
- Religion: Sunni Islam

Afzaa Fadini binti Abdul Aziz (Jawi: داتين ڤدوک سري افزاء فاديني بنتي داتوء عبد العزيز; born 11 April 1993) is a member of Selangor royal family as the consort of Tengku Amir Shah, Raja Muda (Crown Prince) of Selangor, who is first in-line to the Selangor Sultanate.

== Early life and education ==
Afzaa was born on 11 April 1993 at Pantai Hospital, Kuala Lumpur as third child and only daughter of Abdul Aziz and Rosmawati Ismail. She completed her early education at Garden International School, Kuala Lumpur before pursuing A-Levels at St George's School, Ascot, United Kingdom. She graduated Bachelor of Arts in Development Studies & Economics from the School of Oriental and African Studies, University of London, and also graduated Master of Arts in Sustainable Cities from King’s College London. She is also a certified arborist with the International Society of Arboriculture.

== Career ==
Afzaa was project manager at the Tropical Rainforest Conservation & Research Centre (TRCRC) from October 2020 to March 2025. During that period, she assumed responsibilities in the management and protection of conservation areas under the active forest restoration programme in Peninsular Malaysia.

Afzaa was invited to share her views at the 2023 United Nations Climate Change Conference, where she voiced the importance of a community-centered, nature-based approach in addressing environmental challenges. She has also volunteered with Free Food Society on food security efforts for indigenous communities and was involved in human rights advocacy with Amnesty International.

== Marriage and children ==
On 22 September 2025, the Selangor palace announced that Tengku Amir Shah would marry Afzaa Fadini on 2 October. The royal wedding ceremony was held at the Masjid Istana Diraja, Istana Alam Shah on the morning of 2 October 2025. The solemnization was officiated by Selangor's mufti, Anhar Opir, while the Tengku Panglima Raja of Selangor, Tengku Ahmad Shah and the Tengku Indera Pahlawan Diraja, Tengku Putra acted as witnesses. A wedding reception took place at Balairung Seri, Istana Alam Shah on 22 October 2025.

On 21 July 2026, Afzaa gave birth to their first child, a daughter, named Yang Mulia Tengku Alia Amira binti Tengku Amir Shah.

== Titles, styles and honours ==
Styles of Datin Paduka Seri Afzaa Fadini
- Reference style: Her Highness
- Spoken style: Your Highness
- Alternative style: Datin Paduka Seri

The full title and style of Afzaa Fadini is:

Her Highness Datin Paduka Seri Afzaa Fadini binti Dato' Abdul Aziz, S.P.M.S.

=== Honours ===
==== Honours of Selangor ====
- Knight Grand Commander of the Order of the Crown of Selangor (SPMS) – Datin Paduka Seri (2 October 2025)
- Recipient of the Sultan Sharafuddin Silver Jubilee Medal (25 October 2026)
