= Tengku Putra =

Malaysian royal and businessman

- Tengku Indera Pahlawan Diraja
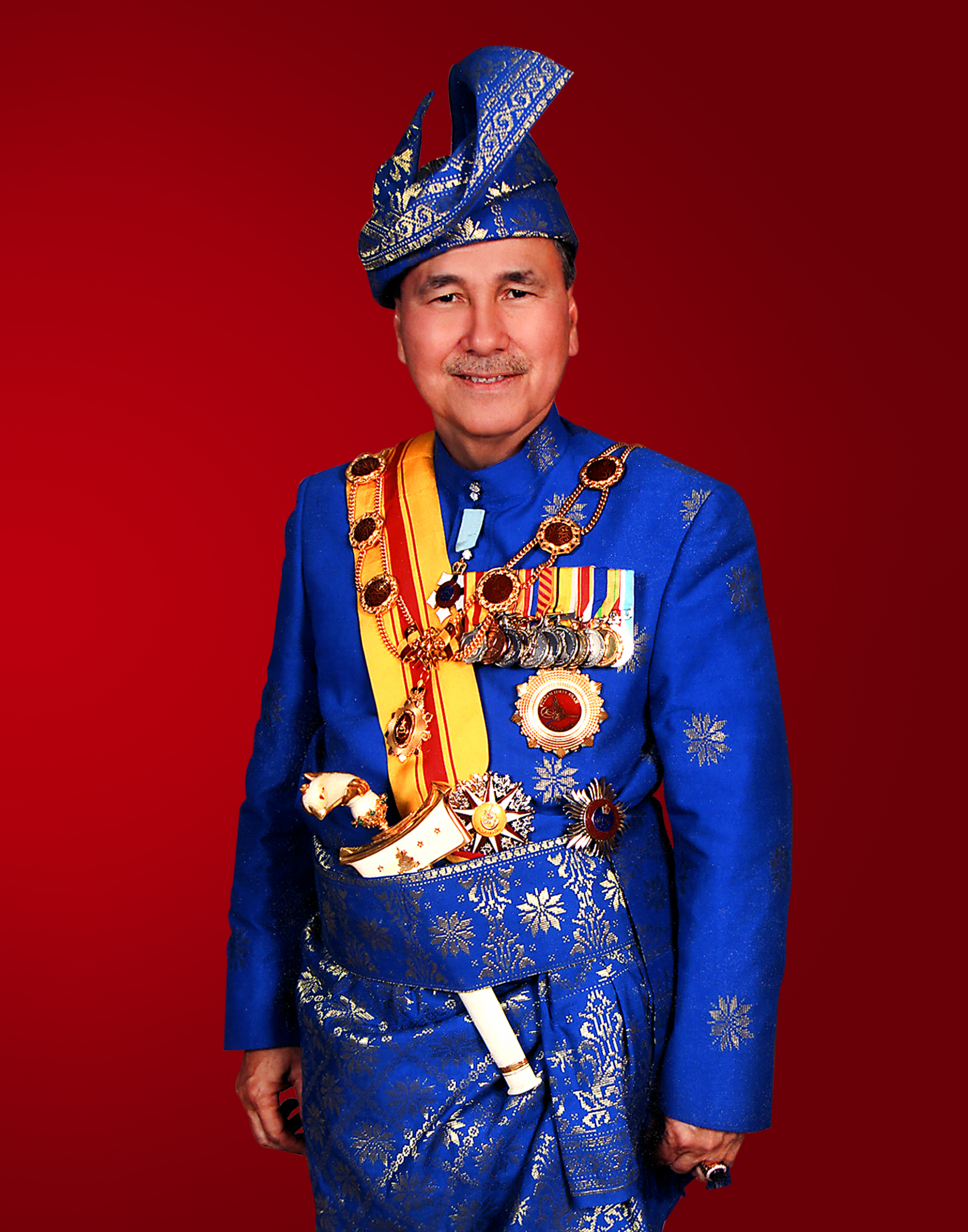
- YAD Tengku Dato' Setia Putra Alhaj
- Born: Tengku Putra bin Tengku Azman Shah; 22 July 1951 (age 75); Kota Bharu, Kelantan
- Spouse: To' Puan Pengiran Hajah Zaliha binti Pengiran Haji Tengah-(Brunei Royal Family) (died 2022)
- Issue: Tengku Saidatul Rehan; Tengku Saifan Rafhan Putra; Tengku Ainul Nur Syuhada
Regnal name
- Tengku Indera Pahlawan Diraja
- House: Opu Daeng Chelak
- Father: Tengku Bendahara; Tengku Azman Shah Al-Haj ibni Almarhum Sultan Hisamuddin Alam Shah Al-Haj
- Mother: Tengku Thuraya Puteri binti Almarhum Sultan Ibrahim
- Occupation: Selangor Council of the Royal Court

Styles of Tengku Dato' Setia Putra Alhaj
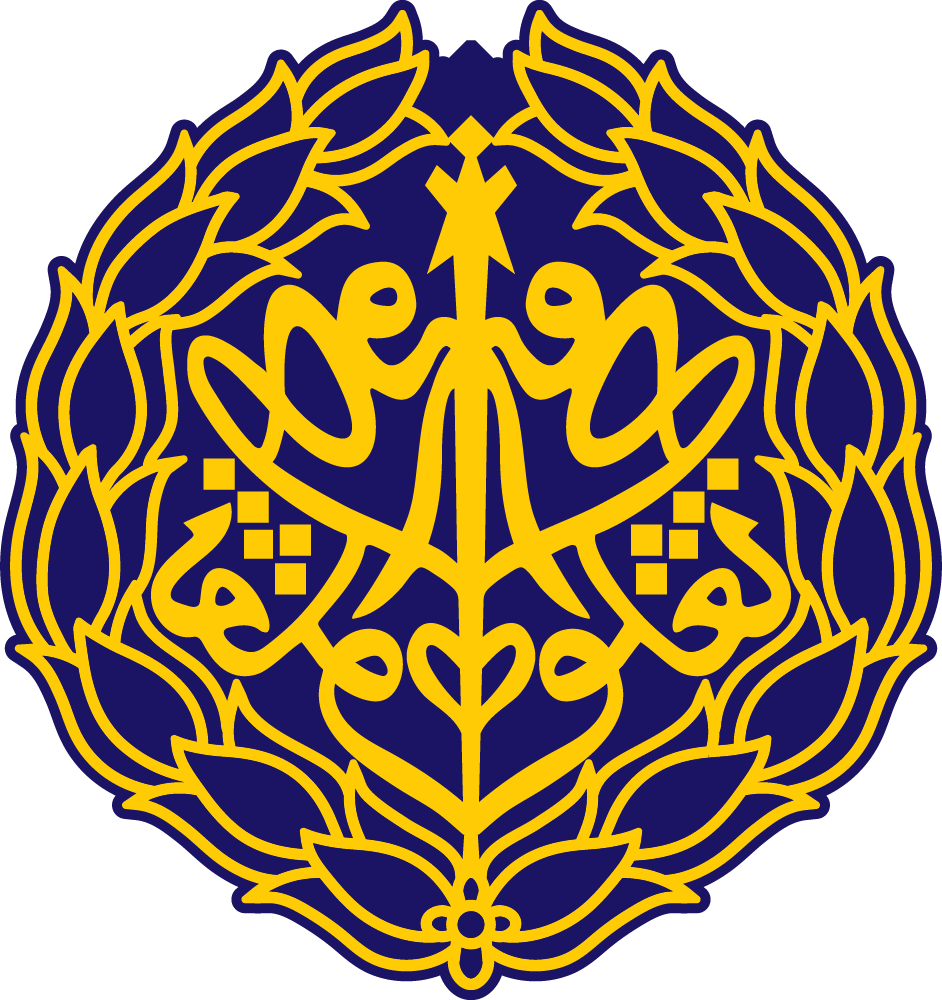
- Reference style: His Highness
- Spoken style: Your Highness
- Alternative style: Tengku

Tengku Dato' Setia Putra Al-Haj bin Tengku Azman Shah Al-Haj (Jawi: تڠكو داتوء ستيا ڤوترا الهاج ابن تڠكو عزمن شاه الهاج; born 22 July 1951) is a Malaysian corporate figure and member of the Selangor royal family and Kelantan royal family. He is the first son of Tengku Bendahara Tengku Azman Shah ibni Al-Marhum Sultan Hisamuddin Alam Shah. He is a first cousin of the current Sultan of Selangor, Sultan Sharafuddin Idris Shah and also a first cousin once removed to the current Sultan of Kelantan, Sultan Muhammad V. He is currently holding the position as Selangor Palace Major Chief (Orang Besar Istana) and has been appointed as a royal council member of Selangor Council of the Royal Court for 6 terms since 2007, which been re-appointed lately on 1 December 2022 as one of the major members in advisory body to the Sultan of Selangor.

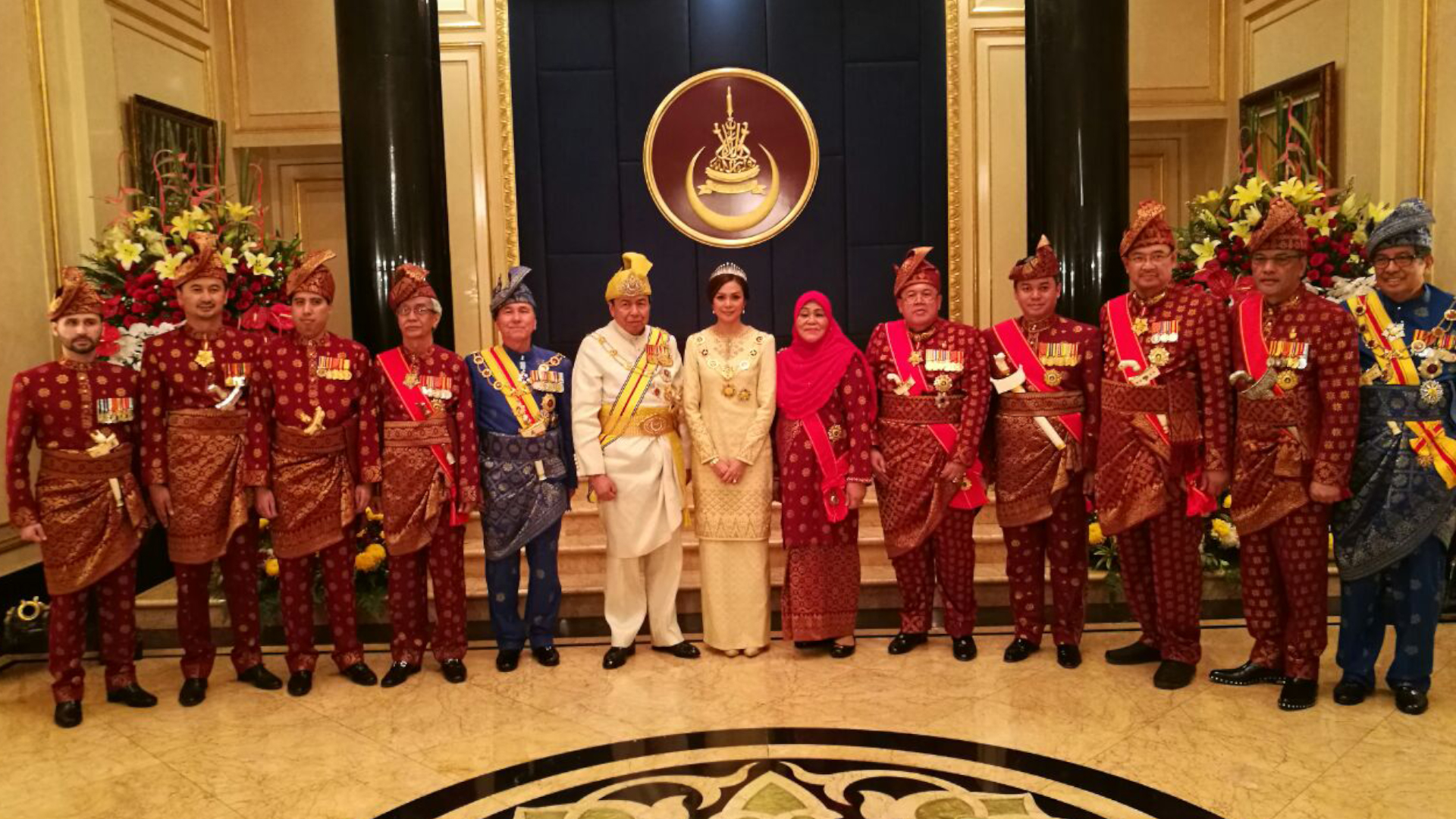
Tengku Dato' Setia Putra Alhaj with Sultan Sharafuddin, Tengku Permaisuri Norashikin and Orang Besar Istana in 2016.

== Biography ==
Tengku Dato' Setia Putra Alhaj was born on 22 July 1951 in Kota Bharu, Kelantan, the state capital of Kelantan. He is the first child of the Tengku Bendahara of Selangor Tengku Azman Shah ibni Al-Marhum Sultan Hisamuddin Alam Shah, (Appointed Regent of Selangor on 13 May 1959) and the Tengku Puan Bendahara of Selangor Tengku Thuraya Puteri binti Al-Marhum Sultan Ibrahim, a Princess of Kelantan.

His uncle Sultan Salahuddin Abdul Aziz Shah Alhaj became the Sultan of Selangor on 1 September 1960, after the death of his grandfather Almarhum Sultan Hisamudin Alam Shah Alhaj. Tengku Dato' Setia Putra Alhaj was a Navy Aide-de-Camp (A.D.C.) and personal assistant to his uncle Sultan Salahuddin Abdul Aziz Shah Alhaj, the 8th Sultan of Selangor and the 11th Yang di-Pertuan Agong of Malaysia before joining cooperate business.

Tengku Dato' Setia Putra Alhaj has extensive interest in Civil and Building Construction, Property Development, Design and Manufacturing Specialist Vehicles such as Fire Engine and Ambulance. Under his leadership, he and his partner companies had successfully completed several Privatize and Joint Venture development projects with the State governments of Selangor and Johor. One of the well known achievement is the development of a premier resort cum resident and USGA class championship Golf Course Kelab Golf Sultan Abdul Aziz Shah in Shah Alam, Malaysia. He is co-chairman of Power Root Berhad and was the Independent Non-Executive Director of CME Berhad which both listed in Bursa Malaysia. Furthermore, he had been appointed as the chairman for Selangor Royal Galley, Sultan Abdul Aziz Royal Gallery to preserve the royal culture for his ancestors.

Taman Tengku Bendahara Azman, located in Klang, Selangor and Two school, SK Tengku Bendahara Azman (1) and SK Tengku Bendahara Azman (2) that named after his late father Tengku Bendahara Tengku Azman Shah had now been chaired by him after his father died on 23 March 2014

== Honours ==
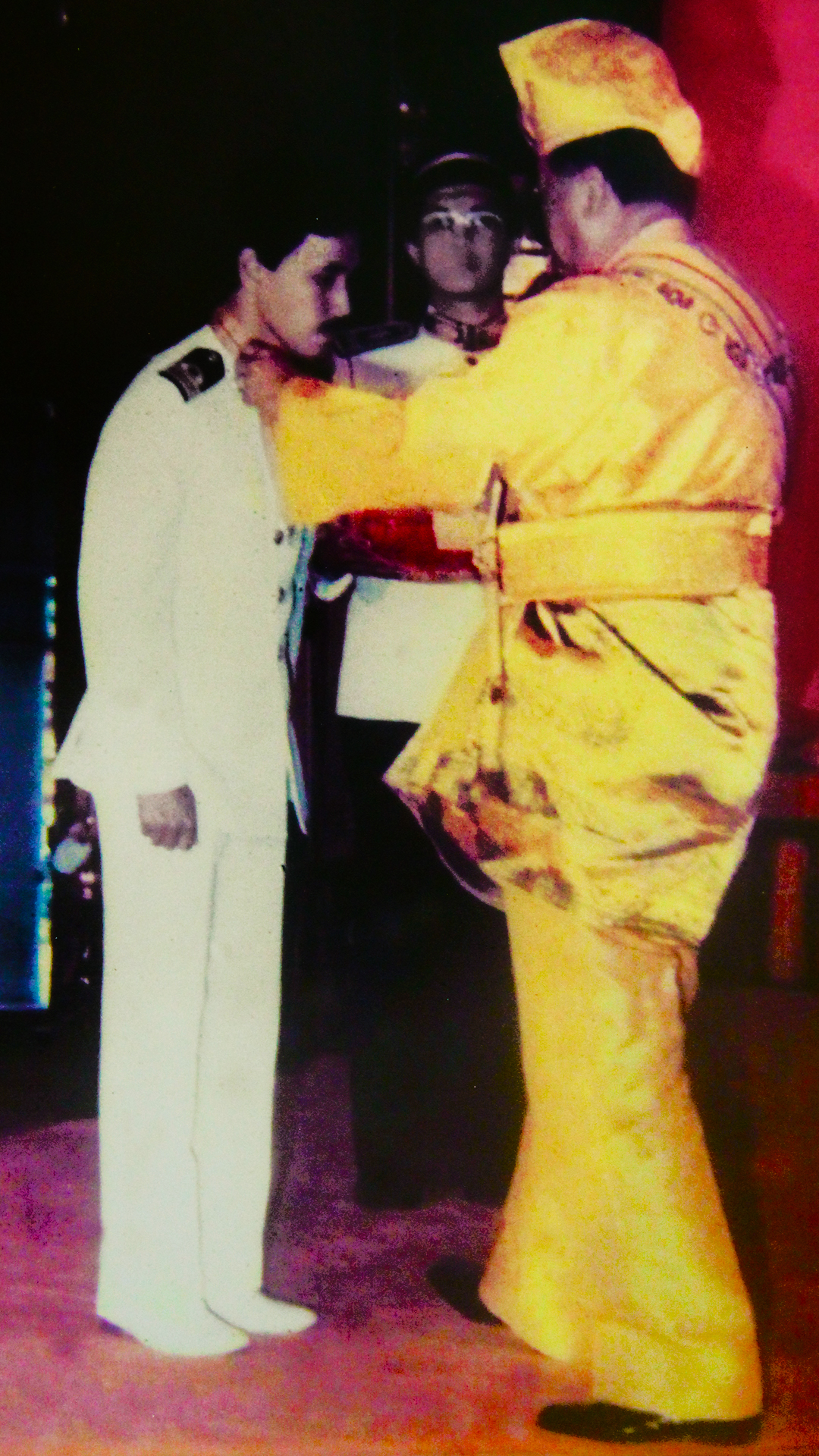
Tengku Dato' Setia Putra Al-Haj receiving SSA from the late Sultan of Selangor

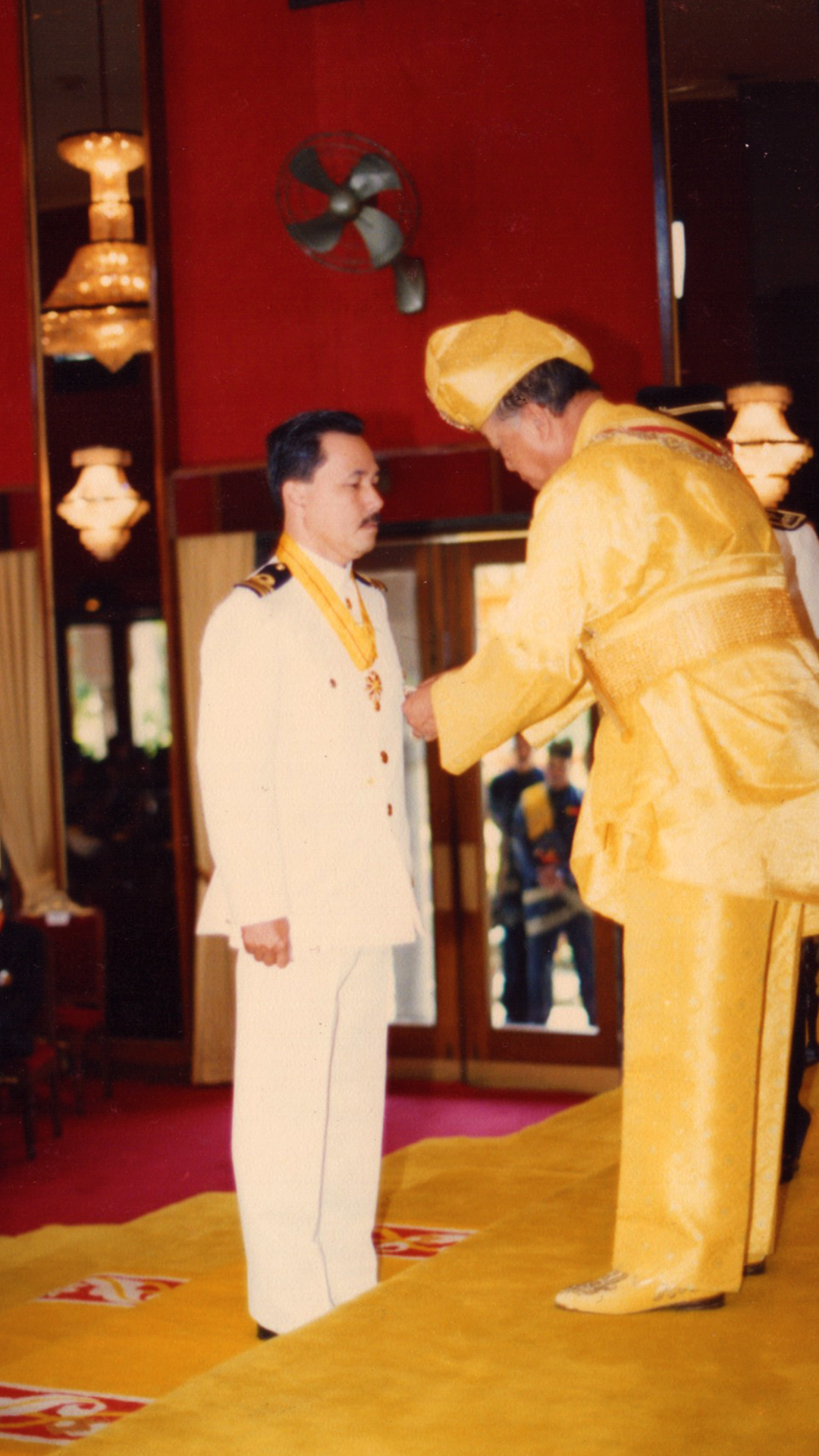
Tengku Dato' Setia Putra Al-Haj receiving DSSA

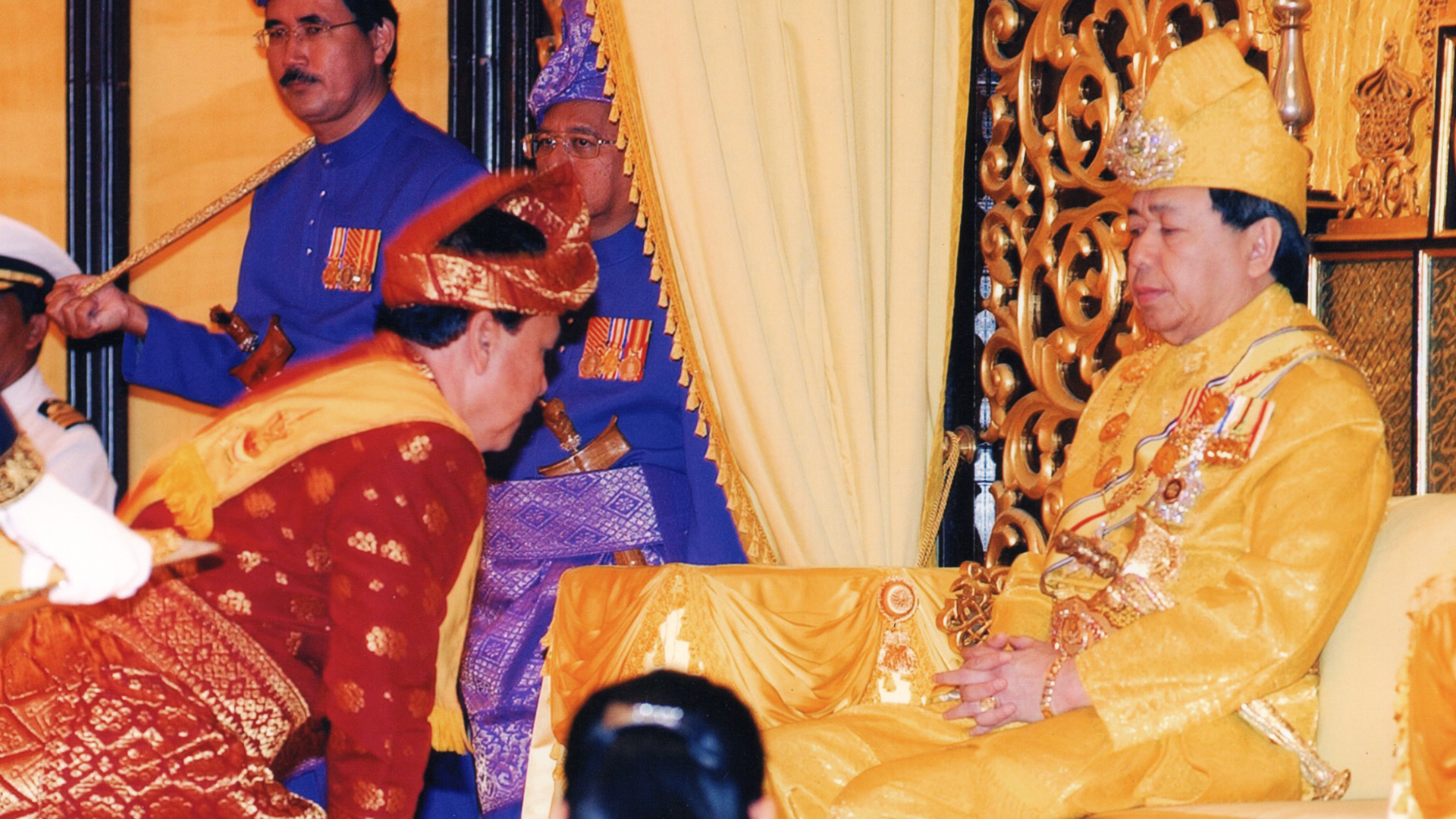
Tengku Dato' Setia Putra Al-Haj received the title and position of Orang Besar Istana Selangor which carried the title "Tengku Indera Pahlawan Diraja"

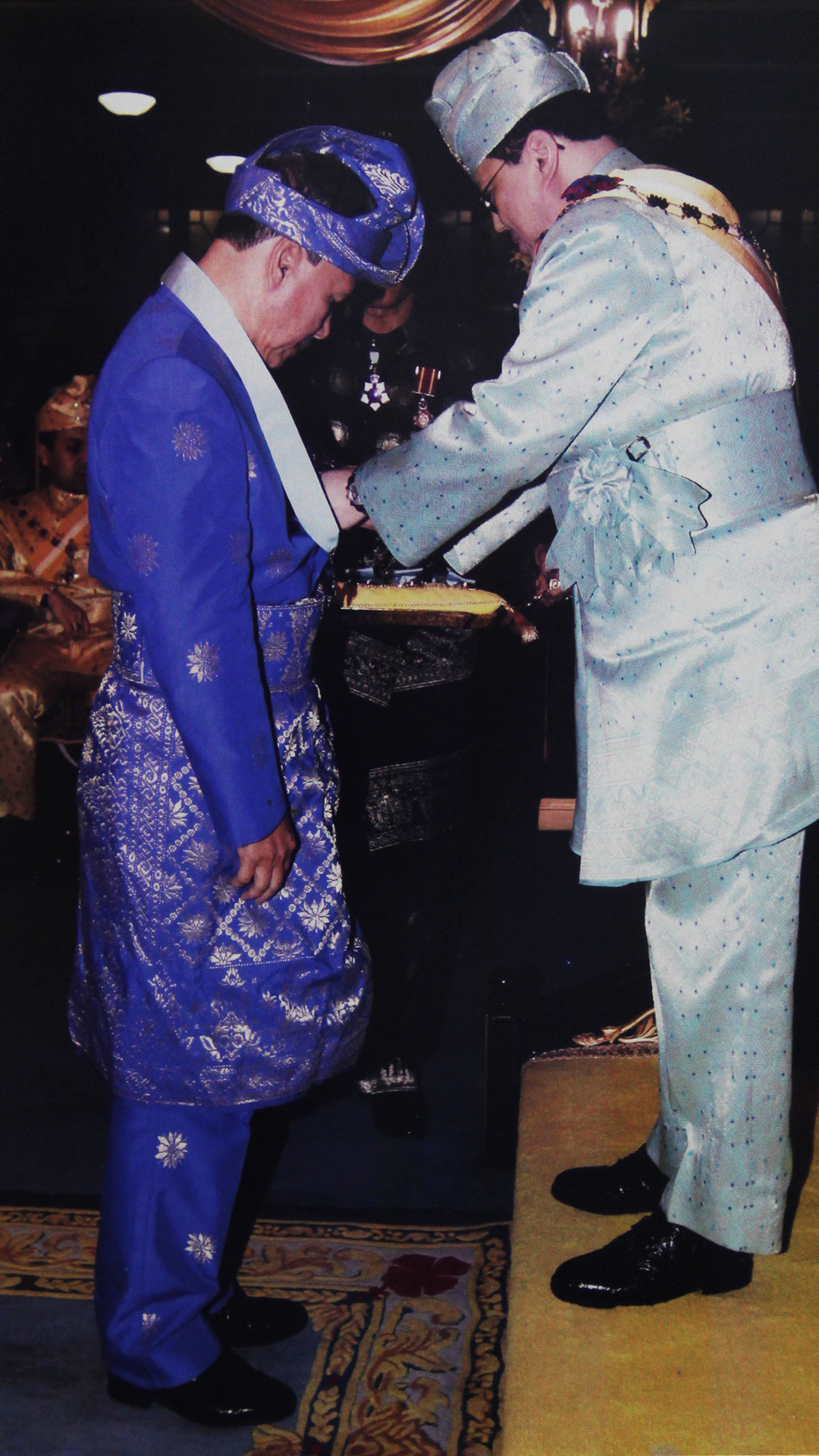
Tengku Dato' Setia Putra Al-Haj receiving DJMK from the late Sultan of Kelantan

=== Titles ===
- Selangor: Tengku Indera Pahlawan Diraja (1 December 2004)
- Selangor: Dewan Diraja Selangor (1 December 2007)

=== Honours of Selangor ===
- Second Class of the Royal Family Order of Selangor (DK II) (11 December 2023)
- Knight Grand Companion of the Order of Sultan Sharafuddin Idris Shah (SSIS) (12 December 2015)
- Knight Companion of the Order of Sultan Salahuddin Abdul Aziz Shah (DSSA) (3 April 1993)
- Companion of the Order of Sultan Salahuddin Abdul Aziz Shah (SSA) (7 September 1985)
- Sultan Sharafuddin Coronation Medal (8 March 2003)
- Sultan Salahuddin Coronation Medal (28 June 1961)
- Sultan Salahuddin Silver Jubilee Medal (3 September 1985)
- Recipient of the Sultan Sharafuddin Silver Jubilee Medal (25 October 2026)

=== Honours of Malaysia ===
- Malaysia
  - Recipient of the 11th Yang di-Pertuan Agong Installation Medal (23 September 1999)
- Kelantan
  - Knight Commander of the Order of the Life of the Crown of Kelantan or Star of Ismail (DJMK) (30 March 2009)
  - Recipient of the Sultan Ismail Petra Silver Jubilee Medal (30 March 2004)
