= Tengku Zatashah =

Malaysian noblewoman

Zatashah
- Princess of Selangor (Note: Princess of Selangor is not a formal title, but many news outlet referred her as such.)
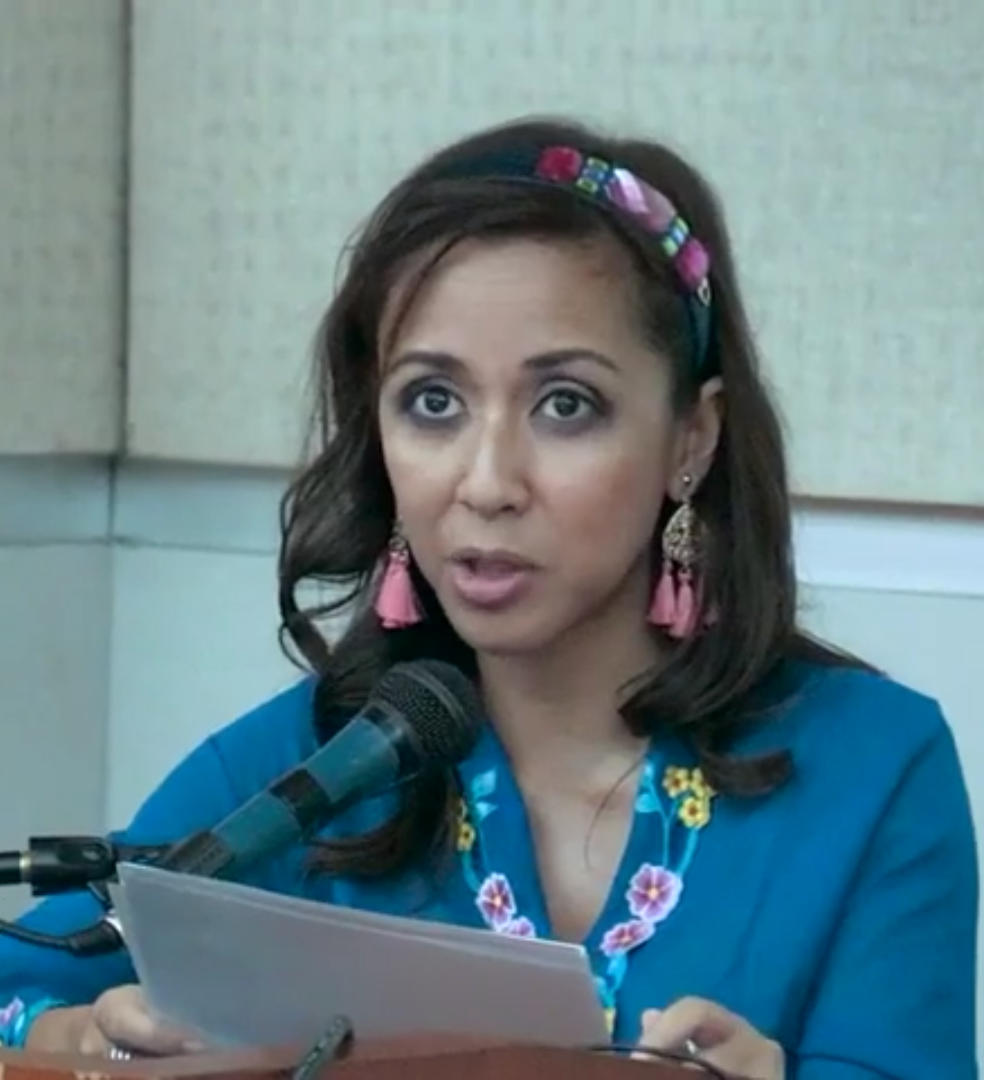
- Zatashah in 2019
- Born: Tengku Zatashah; 12 October 1973 (age 53)
- Spouse: Aubry Rahim Mennesson (m. 2007)
- House: Opu Daeng Chelak
- Father: Sultan Sharafuddin Idris Shah Alhaj Ibni Almarhum Sultan Salahuddin Abdul Aziz Alhaj
- Mother: Raja Zarina
- Religion: Sunni Islam
- Occupation: Journalist, businessperson, environmentalist

Tengku Zatashah (born 12 October 1973) is a member of the Selangor royal family and the second daughter of Sultan Sharafuddin Idris Shah, the 9th and current Sultan of Selangor.

== Early life ==
Zatashah was born on 12 October 1973 to the then Raja Muda of Selangor Sharafuddin Idris Shah and his first wife Zarina. Her parents were divorced in 1987, when she was fourteen. She has an elder sister, Tengku Zerafina, and a younger half-brother, Tengku Amir Shah.

She attended Alice Smith School, Kuala Lumpur from 1978 to 1983. She received her secondary education at a public school in London. She received her Bachelor of Arts (Hons) in Spanish and French from Middlesex University, London in 1996. She also went to Université de la Sorbonne, receiving her diploma, Diplôme Cours de Civilisations française in 2001. She furthered her study to the American Graduate School of International Relations and Diplomacy (ASGIRD), Paris and received her Masters in International Relations & Diplomacy in 2007. At some point, she also studied and graduated from INSEAD in Finance for Executives programme, in Fontainebleau, France.

She is fluent in Malay, English, French and Spanish, and is currently learning Mandarin. Zatashah is also a holder of Teaching of English in Foreign Language (TEFL) Cambridge diploma, which she received from British Council, Kuala Lumpur.

== Career ==
She started her career as an account executive of BDDP, an advertising agency in Barcelona, Spain from 1995 to 1996. She also worked as Front Desk Manager of Ascott Hotel, London from 1996 to 1997. Her first journalist career started when she became a featured writer and journalist in New Straits Times from 2001 to 2003, writing in Life and Times section. She is also the Editor-in-chief of Malaysian Association France from 2005 to 2007.

From 2005 until 2009, she worked as International Corporate Communications Manager at L'Oréal Paris, in France. There, she spearheaded communication policies in sustainable development, Human Resources, media training of Management Committee, and was a key member of crisis management. She became a columnist on The Edge (Malaysia) from 2009 to 2010.

She shifted her career focus in 2009 when she became the joint managing director, with her husband, to Originalo Sdn Bhd from 2009 until 2014. She is also the chairman and CEO of Light Cibles Malaysia, an international lighting design consultancy firm since 2011. Some of her projects include Kuala Lumpur Lighting Master Plan and development of Four Seasons Place Kuala Lumpur, and PJ Sentral Garden City. Zatashah is also an independent non-executive director of Kim teck Cheong Holdings Berhad, a Sabah-based Consumer Packaged Goods (CPG) distribution company since December 2014. She is currently independent non-executive director of InNature Berhad, a leading regional cosmetics retailer that comprises The Body Shop Malaysia, Vietnam, Singapore and Cambodia, and Burger & Lobster restaurant franchise Malaysia and Indonesia, and Yves Rocher Malaysia France's leading biocosmetics brand.

== Personal life ==
Zatashah met her husband, Aubry Rahim Mennesson (né Aubry Marie Mennesson), SSIS, (born 12 February 1972), a French born film producer and entrepreneur, in 2005 through mutual friends, while working for L'Oreal and completing her masters in Paris. Mennesson, a native of Paris was asked to show the city around to Zatashah, who was new in the region. Mennesson did not know of her royal status in the first few months they started seeing each other, as Zatashah had introduced herself as only a "diplomat girl". He only realised that she was a princess after seeing a card from her father with a picture of him in full regalia.

Mennesson converted to Islam prior to their wedding and learnt under Algerian-born Dr Dalil Boubakeur, the Grand Imam and rector of the Grande Mosquée de Paris, who is also the head of the French-Muslim association. The couple married at the Grande Mosquée de Paris, France on 10 November 2007. The solemnization ceremony was also officiated by Dr Dalil Boubakeur.

A wedding reception was held on 28 February 2008 at Istana Alam Shah, Klang. Sharafuddin of Selangor hosted the dinner at the Royal Banquet Hall, which was served by personnel from Royal Malaysian Navy. Tengku Amir Shah gave a speech at the event, saying that his sister is a "funny and hardworking girl". Among the guests who attended the reception were the then-Regent of Perak, Raja Dr Nazrin Shah and his wife Raja Puan Besar Perak Tuanku Zara Salim, the then-Selangor Mentri Besar, Khir Toyo and wife, and the wife to the then-Deputy Prime Minister of Malaysia, Rosmah Mansor. Guests were entertained by musicians from Gamelan Diraja Selangor and Shah Alam City Council orchestra.

In 2025, Zatashah was commended Honorary Vice-Commander of Malaysian Civil Defence Force (Angkatan Pertahanan Awam Malaysia) for her work with Food Bank Malaysia Foundation, involving herself in rescue missions to deliver food to victims with APM.

== Philanthropy ==
Upon her return to Malaysia in 2010, Zatashah joined Alliance Française Kuala Lumpur as vice-president, and was later elected as president. As president, she helmed the development of strategic expansion of satellite classes, and increased awareness of its cultural activity. She was nominated to represent Asia and Malaysia at the Foundation Alliance Francaise Convention 2013 in Paris. As president, she organised a French cultural festival, Le French Festival in April 2019, featuring the largest French Film Festival in Malaysia, live theatre and dance performances, among others.

Zatashah is the royal patron of Make-A-Wish-Malaysia since 2015. She is also a volunteer at Kechara Soup Kitchen, a non-profit organisation that focused on feeding the homeless since 2015.

In 2016, through Make-A-Wish Malaysia, she launched the #ZeroFoodWestage campaign, encouraging major hotels in Klang Valley to direct their excess food to Kechara Soup Kitchen. The campaign was launched after she learnt that Ramadan buffet waste at least 270,000 tonnes of food.

She also kicked-off a social media campaign, #SayNo2Plastic in 2016, encouraging Malaysian to avoid using single-used plastic, and it became one of the biggest anti single-used plastic movement in the country. She posted pictures of her and the members of the royal family carrying their Tiffin carrier while going to bazaar Ramadan in her instagram account. She also showed how she gave up plastic straws and swapped them for metal straws. Zatashah carried her own collapsible coffee cup and tumbler around in effort to not use plastic water bottles. As a result of her eco-friendly ways, she is known as "the girl with the tiffin" among the vendor owners. She received an award for her campaign at International Dive and Maritime Expo Adex Singapore in April 2019. She is also named as Adex Ocean Ambassador.

On 8 October 2018, she collaborated with CH Carolina Herrera in a campaign, "Shop with a cause". She invited several guests to the shop, where ten percent proceeds from every purchase in-store will go to Make-A-Wish Malaysia.

Zatashah hosted a beach clean-up in Pulau Redang, where volunteers managed to collect 4,655 plastic water bottles in two hours in May 2019. In July 2019, she hosted a beach clean-up programme at Pantai Morib Baru. She and a group of 500 volunteers end up collecting about 780kg of trash, nearly half of them are from plastic waste.

She launched a collection of hairband, in collaboration with Sereni & Shentel named, SSxTZ. The collection featured seven distinct limited edition Blair headband with coloured inspired by Zatashah's personal batik collection. All the proceeds of the collection will go towards Make-A-Wish Malaysia.

Zatashah is Chairperson of Food Bank Malaysia Foundation, rescuing surplus food to feed the community in need throughout Malaysia since 2019. She is also Board of Trustee for Selangor Youth Community (SAY) and Crown Prince of Selangor Foundation (YRMS) to champion youth empowerment and vocational training programmes for youths at risk. Zatashah has also worked with Kajang Prison for Women prospects in support of the women getting a second chance in life, learning skills and earning an income. She also spearheaded a book drive donation to Kajang Prison with BookXcess who donated 800 books to the prison library.

== Honours and awards ==
=== Honours of Selangor ===
- Knight Grand Companion of the Order of Sultan Sharafuddin Idris Shah (SSIS) – Datin Paduka Setia (11 December 2009)
- Sultan Sharafuddin Coronation Medal First Class in gold (8 March 2003)
- Sultan Salahuddin Silver Jubilee Medal (3 September 1985)
- Recipient of the Sultan Sharafuddin Silver Jubilee Medal (25 October 2026)

=== Honours of Malaysia ===
- Malaysia
  - Recipient of the 11th Yang di-Pertuan Agong Installation Medal (23 September 1999)

=== Foreign honours ===
- France
  - Chevalier (Knight) of the National Order of the Legion of Honour (19 April 2017)
  - Officer of the Order of Academic Palms (3 December 2024)
