= Sharafuddin of Selangor =

Sultan of Selangor since 2001

Sharafuddin
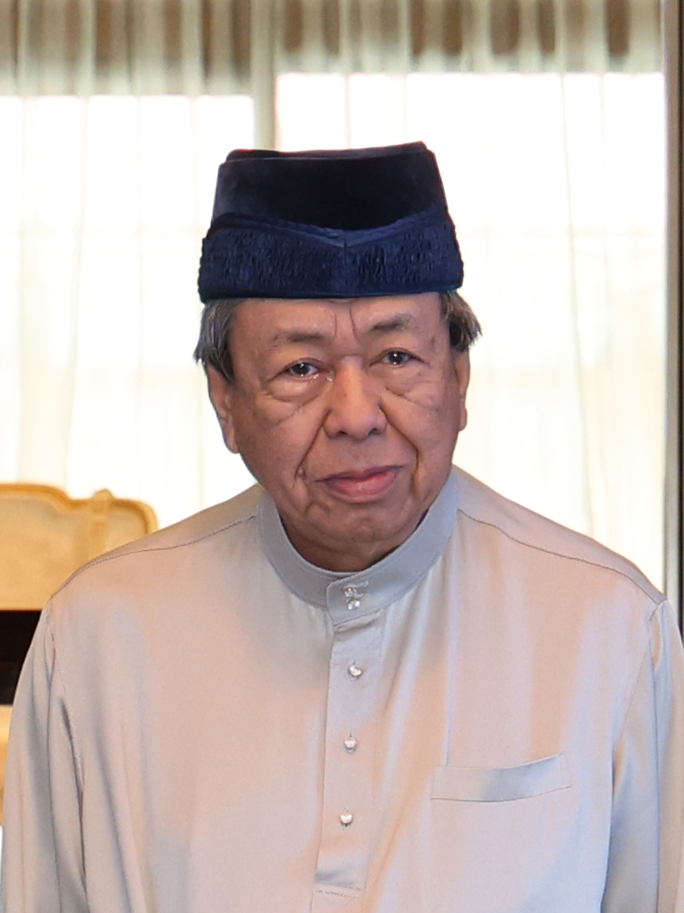
- Sharafuddin in 2024

Sultan of Selangor
- Reign: 22 November 2001 – present
- Coronation: 8 March 2003
- Predecessor: Salahuddin
- Heir apparent: Tengku Amir Shah
- Menteri Besar: See list: Khir Toyo; Khalid Ibrahim; Azmin Ali; Amirudin Shari
- Born: 24 December 1945 (age 80) (Note: His birthday is celebrated on 11 December); Istana Jema'ah, Klang, Selangor (now Kolej Islam Sultan Alam Shah, Klang)
- Spouse: Raja Zarina binti Raja Zainal Abidin (m. 1968; div. 1986) Nur Lisa Idris binti Abdullah (m. 1988; div. 1997) Tengku Permaisuri Norashikin (m. 2016)
- Issue: Tengku Zerafina; Tengku Zatashah; Tengku Amir Shah
Names
- Tengku Idris Shah ibni Tengku Abdul Aziz Shah
Regnal name
- Sultan Sharafuddin Idris Shah Alhaj ibni Almarhum Sultan Salahuddin Abdul Aziz Shah Alhaj
- House: Opu Daeng Chelak
- Father: Sultan Salahuddin Abdul Aziz Shah Alhaj ibni Almarhum Sultan Hisamuddin Alam Shah Alhaj
- Mother: Paduka Bonda Raja Selangor; Raja Saidatul Ihsan binti Almarhum Raja Bendahara Tengku Badar Shah
- Religion: Sunni Islam

Sharafuddin Idris Shah Alhaj Ibni Almarhum Sultan Salahuddin Abdul Aziz Shah Alhaj (Jawi: سلطان شرف الدين إدريس شاه الحاج ابن المرحوم سلطان صلاح الدين عبدالعزيز شاه الحاج; born 24 December 1945) has been the Sultan of Selangor since ascending to the throne in November 2001.

== Early life and education ==
Sharafuddin was born on 24 December 1945, at the Istana Jema'ah in Klang, as the first son of the Raja Muda (Crown Prince) of Selangor, Tengku Abdul Aziz Shah and his first wife, Raja Saidatul Ihsan binti Tengku Badar Shah (1923–2011). He was named Tengku Idris Shah at birth. His father was the eldest son of Hisamuddin of Selangor and Raja Jemaah, who later became the second Yang di-Pertuan Agong (King of Malaysia) and his mother the Raja Permaisuri Agong (Queen of Malaysia). His mother was the grandchild of both Sulaiman of Selangor and Abdul Jalil of Perak. As such, his parents were first cousins.

He received his primary education at Malay Primary School, Kuala Lumpur when he was nine. He then attended St. John's Institution from 1954 until 1959.

In 1960, his father became the Sultan of Selangor, taking the regnal name Sultan Salahuddin Abdul Aziz Shah. In the same year, Sharafuddin was proclaimed the Raja Muda of Selangor at age fifteen. He was sent abroad to continue his education, attending the Kinross Wolaroi School in Orange, New South Wales, Australia, from 1970 and later Langhurst College in Surrey, United Kingdom, from 1974.

After returning from the United Kingdom in 1968, Sharafuddin joined the government as a public servant, and was attached to the Selangor State Secretariat under the administration of Menteri Besar Harun Idris. He served in the Kuala Lumpur District Office and Kuala Lumpur police department.

In 1970, he was formally installed and took oath as the 8th Raja Muda of Selangor in a ceremony held at the Istana Alam Shah, Klang.

On 24 April 1999, he was appointed as Regent of Selangor after his father became the 11th Yang di-Pertuan Agong.

== Sultan of Selangor ==
On 22 November 2001, Sharafuddin was proclaimed as the ninth sultan of Selangor, succeeding his father, who died after serving two years as Yang di-Pertuan Agong. He took the regnal name Sharafuddin (connoting 'religious enlightenment' in Arabic), and is styled as Sultan Sharafuddin Idris Shah.

=== Coronation ===
His formal coronation took place on 8 March 2003 at the Istana Alam Shah in Klang.

The event started with inspection of Royal Guard of Honour made up of 103 members of the Royal Malaysian Navy by Sharafuddin. He entered the throne room accompanied by a procession of palace officers. He carried out a few rituals including kissing the Quran and kissing the royal regalia, Keris Terapang Gabus before being crowned by the Selangor Mufti.

The ceremony was attended by royal family members of the monarchies of Malaysia and federal government officers. Those who were in attendance include Raja Muda of Selangor Tengku Amir Shah, Tengku Sri Bendahara Raja of Terengganu Tengku Mustaffa Kamel, Tunku Laxamana of Negeri Sembilan Tunku Naquiyuddin, Raja Muda of Perak Raja Nazrin Shah, Tengku Mahkota of Kelantan Tengku Muhammad Faris Petra, Raja Muda of Kedah Tunku Abdul Malik, Tunku Mahkota of Johor Tunku Ibrahim Ismail and Tengku Mahkota of Pahang Tengku Abdullah. Also in attendance were acting Prime Minister Abdullah Ahmad Badawi, who represented the Yang di-Pertuan Agong Tuanku Syed Sirajuddin, Regent of Perlis Tuanku Syed Faizuddin Putra Jamalullail, and Pengiran Muda Mahkota Pengiran Muda Haji Al Muhtadee Billah.

== Reign ==
As sultan, he is known to have revoked state awards conferred by him or by his father. In 2007, he revoked the Dato' title of a businessman who pleaded guilty to financial fraud. He has also suspended others who have been charged in court for various misdealings or faced bankruptcy. In 2011, he suspended the datukship of former transport minister Chan Kong Choy in relation to the latter being charged in court over the Port Klang Free Zone scandal.

The 2008 general election saw sweeping political change in Selangor. For the first time, Barisan Nasional (BN) did not win control of the state assembly. Sharafuddin presided over the swearing-in of the first non-BN Menteri Besar of Selangor.

In May 2009, he underwent a ten-hour open heart surgery at Stanford University Medical Center in Palo Alto, California.

In early 2011, Sharafuddin intervened in a crisis over the appointment of the state secretary, the state's highest-ranking civil servant. The federal government appointed Mohd Khusrin Munawi to the position, which was consented to by Sharafuddin. However, the Pakatan Rakyat-led state government opposed the appointment. The state government eventually relented, and Khusrin assumed his duties in February 2011.

In 2014, Sharafuddin revoked the 'Dato' Seri' title of Anwar Ibrahim following the Kajang Move political crisis.

In 2020, The Straits Times reported that Sharafuddin owned shares in a company that planned development in the Kuala Langat North Forest Reserve. Following the report and public uproar, the state government cancelled the plan.

In 2022, Malaysiakini reported that Sharafuddin's family (including his brother, son and daughter) were involved in companies given quarrying leases in the Bukit Lagong Forest Reserve, next to the Forest Research Institute Malaysia (FRIM).

In July 2024, Sharafuddin underwent cataract surgery on his right eye. According to an announcement by the Selangor Royal Office on Facebook, the surgery had been delayed for the past eight months but did not give a reason. He had previously had the same surgery on his left eye.

He was the Pro-chancellor of MARA University of Technology (UiTM) from the year 2000 until 2005, and has been the chancellor of Universiti Putra Malaysia since 2002.

== Marriages and children ==
Sharafuddin married thrice.

In 1968 as Tengku Idris, he married a distant member of the Perak royal family, Raja Zarina binti Raja Tan Sri Zainal Abidin. The marriage ended in divorce in 1986. Sharafuddin and Raja Zarina have two daughters:

- Tengku Zerafina (born 1969), currently an entrepreneur based in London. She married Colin Salem Parbury, a British, on 5 December 2004 and they have one daughter.
- Tengku Zatashah (born 1973), currently the CEO of Light Cibles Malaysia, and an environmental activist. She married Aubry Rahim Mennesson (born 1972), a French, at the Grand Mosque of Paris, France on 10 November 2007. A wedding reception was held on 28 February 2008 at the Istana Alam Shah, Klang.

In 1988, Tengku Idris married American-born Nur Lisa Idris binti Abdullah (née Lisa Davis). They divorced in 1997 and have one son:

- Tengku Amir Shah (born 1990), the current Raja Muda of Selangor. He married Afzaa Fadini Abdul Aziz (born 1993) at the Masjid Istana Diraja, Istana Alam Shah, Klang on 2 October 2025. A wedding reception was held on 22 October 2025 at the Istana Alam Shah, Klang.

In August 2016, as Sultan, he married television personality Norashikin Abdul Rahman, now known as Tengku Permaisuri Norashikin. The solemnisation ceremony was performed by Selangor Mufti Dato’ Mohd Tamyes Abd Wahid at the Masjid Istana Diraja in the Istana Alam Shah, Klang and was witnessed by Selangor deputy mufti Dr Anhar Opir, Imam Mohd Rasid Mahful, former deputy mufti of Selangor Dato’ Abdul Majid Omar and Selangor Islamic Religious Council member Datuk Salehuddin Saidin.

== Interests ==
Sharafuddin is known for being adventurous, having circumnavigated the world and scaled a mountain. At 30, he climbed Mount Kinabalu.

Prior to becoming Sultan, Sharafuddin was an avid sailor. In 1995, he circumnavigated his yacht, SY Jugra, around the world. The journey took 22 months. He sold the yacht before becoming sultan. The Raja Muda Selangor International Regatta, a major annual sailing event, is named after him.

He has also taken part in rallies and long distance car races. He joined and completed the 1997 Peking to Paris Motor Challenge in his 1932 Ford Model B. He covered 16,000 km in 43 days, winning the silver medal in the vintage car category. In 1986, he drove a Proton Saga from Kota Kinabalu to Kuching, covering 1,111 km in two days.

== Titles, styles, honours and recognitions ==
Styles of Sharafuddin Idris Shah
- Reference style: His Royal Highness
- Spoken style: Your Royal Highness
- Alternative style: Tuanku

Sharafuddin's full style and title is: Duli Yang Maha Mulia Sultan Sharafuddin Idris Shah Alhaj ibni Almarhum Sultan Salahuddin Abdul Aziz Shah Alhaj, D.K., D.M.N., D.K. (Terengganu), D.K. (Kelantan), D.K. (Perak), D.K. (Perlis), D.K. (Negeri Sembilan), D.K. (Kedah), D.K. (Johor), D.K. (Pahang), S.P.M.S., S.S.I.S., S.P.M.J., Sultan dan Yang di-Pertuan Selangor Darul Ehsan Serta Segala Daerah Takluknya.

Or in English: His Royal Highness Sultan Sharafuddin Idris Shah Alhaj ibni Almarhum Sultan Salahuddin Abdul Aziz Shah Alhaj, D.K., D.M.N., D.K. (Terengganu), D.K. (Kelantan), D.K. (Perak), D.K. (Perlis), D.K. (Negeri Sembilan), D.K. (Kedah), D.K. (Johor), D.K. (Pahang), S.P.M.S., S.S.I.S., S.P.M.J., The Sultan and Sovereign Ruler of Selangor Abode of Sincerity and its Sovereign Dependencies

=== Military ranks ===
Malaysia

- 1974: Honorary Major, Rejimen Askar Wataniah
- (Malaysia) 1998: Honorary Commander, Royal Malaysian Navy Volunteer Reserve
- (Malaysia) 2001: "Captain-in Chief", Captain, Royal Malaysian Navy
- (Malaysia) 17 April 2002: "Captain-in Chief", Rear Admiral, Royal Malaysian Navy
- 7 October 2004: Honorary Beret, Paskal

=== Honours ===
In 1987, he was appointed Honorary Life President of the Football Association of Selangor.

In March 2001, he received an honorary degree from Universiti Teknologi MARA.

==== Honours of Selangor ====
- Grand Master (since 21 November 2001) and First Class (DK I) (1973) of the Royal Family Order of Selangor
- Grand Master (since 21 November 2001) and Knight Grand Commander (SPMS) (2001) of the Order of the Crown of Selangor
- Founding Grand Master (since 14 December 2002) and Knight Grand Companion of the Order of Sultan Sharafuddin Idris Shah (SSIS)
- Grand Master (since 21 November 2001) of the Order of Sultan Salahuddin Abdul Aziz Shah (SSSA)
- Sultan Sharafuddin Coronation Medal (8 March 2003)
- Sultan Salahuddin Coronation Medal (28 June 1961)
- Sultan Sharafuddin Silver Jubilee Medal (25 October 2026)
- Sultan Salahuddin Silver Jubilee Medal (3 September 1985)

==== Honours of Malaysia ====
- Malaysia
  - Recipient of the Order of the Crown of the Realm (DMN) (19 February 2003)
  - Recipient of the 11th Yang di-Pertuan Agong Installation Medal (23 September 1999)
  - Recipient of the 12th Yang di-Pertuan Agong Installation Medal (25 April 2002)
  - Recipient of the 13th Yang di-Pertuan Agong Installation Medal (26 April 2007)
  - Recipient of the 14th Yang di-Pertuan Agong Installation Medal (11 April 2012)
  - Recipient of the 15th Yang di-Pertuan Agong Installation Medal (24 April 2017)
  - Recipient of the 16th Yang di-Pertuan Agong Installation Medal (30 July 2019)
  - Recipient of the 17th Yang di-Pertuan Agong Installation Medal (20 July 2024)
- Johor
  - First Class of the Royal Family Order of Johor (DK I)
  - Knight Grand Commander of the Order of the Crown of Johor (SPMJ) – Dato' (1975)
- Kedah
  - Member of the Royal Family Order of Kedah (DK) (2003)
- Kelantan
  - Recipient of the Royal Family Order of Kelantan or Star of Yunus (DK) (2002)
- Negeri Sembilan
  - Member of the Royal Family Order of Negeri Sembilan (DKNS) (2002)
- Pahang
  - Member 1st class of the Family Order of the Crown of Indra of Pahang (DK I) (8 April 2021)
- Perak
  - Recipient of the Royal Family Order of Perak (DK) (20 May 2002)
- Perlis
  - Recipient of the Perlis Family Order of the Gallant Prince Syed Putra Jamalullail (DK) (2002)
  - Recipient of Tuanku Syed Sirajuddin Jamalullail Silver Jubilee Medal (2025)
- Terengganu
  - Member first class of the Family Order of Terengganu (DK I) (2003)
  - Member second class of the Family Order of Terengganu (DK II) (1984)

==== Foreign honours ====
- France
  - Commander of the National Order of the Legion of Honour (20 February 2012)
- Brunei
  - Coronation Medal (1 August 1968)
  - Sultan of Brunei Golden Jubilee Medal (5 October 2017)

=== Honorary degrees ===
- United Kingdom
  - Honorary degree of Laws from University of Nottingham - (2018)
  - Honorary degree from Heriot-Watt University - (2018)
- Malaysia
  - Honorary Doctorate of Public Administration from Universiti Teknologi MARA (UiTM) - (2001)

=== Places named after him ===
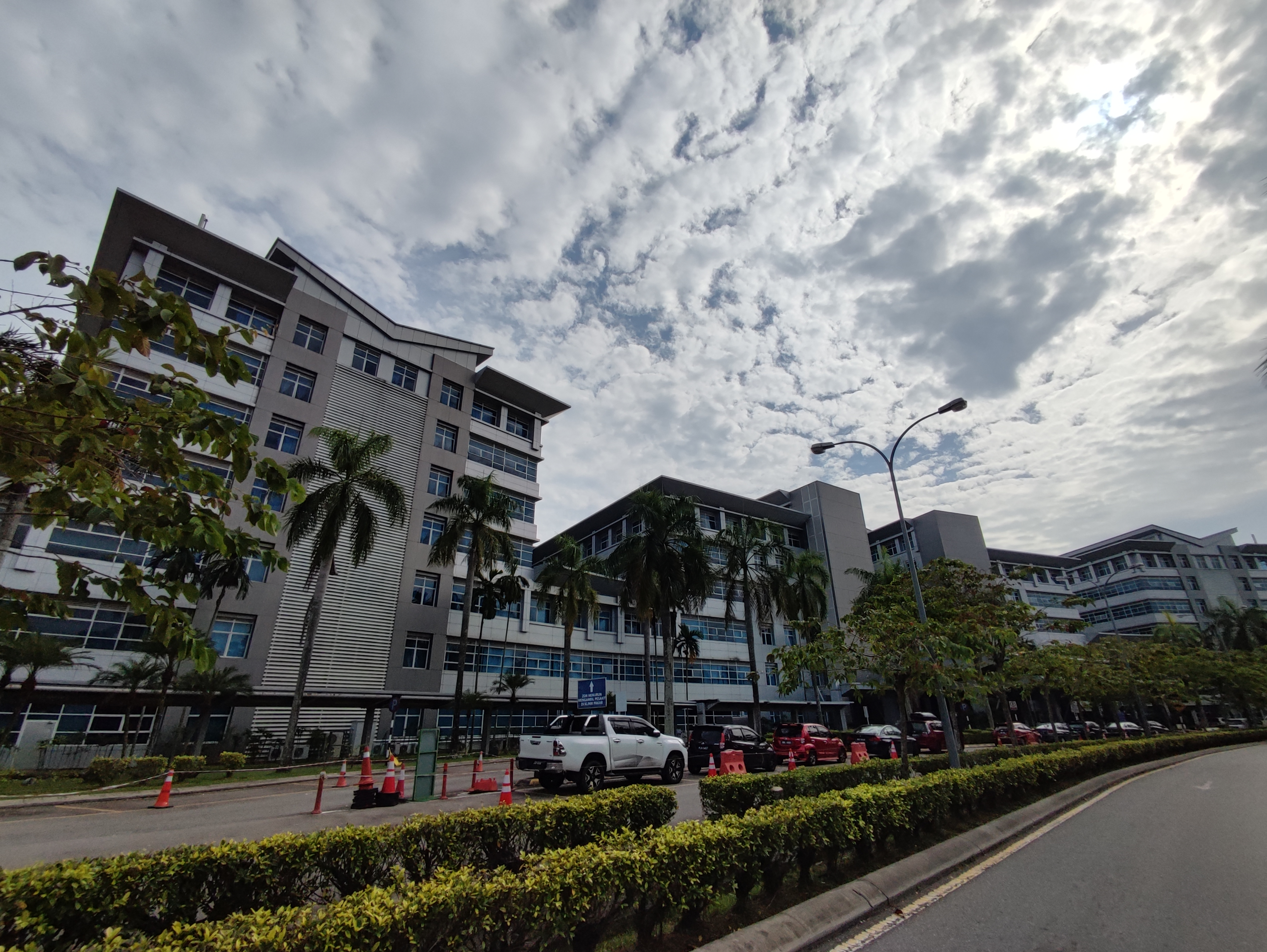
Sultan Idris Shah Serdang Hospital

- Sultan Idris Shah Serdang Hospital, Sepang, Selangor
- Politeknik Sultan Idris Shah in Sungai Air Tawar, Sabak Bernam, Selangor
- Sultan Idris Shah Building in Shah Alam, Selangor

Regnal titles
Preceded by Sultan Salahuddin Abdul Aziz Shah	Sultan of Selangor; 2001 – present	Incumbent; Heir apparent: Tengku Amir Shah
