= House of Opu Daeng Chelak =

Family consisting of the close relatives of the monarch of Selangor

House of Opu Daeng Chelak Selangor Royal Family
- Buginese–Malay royal house
- Parent family: Royal Buginese Riau (Opu Daeng Chelak, 2nd Yang di-Pertuan Muda of Riau) from agnatic line; Royal Buginese Luwu (Raja Opu La Maddusila Petta Mattinroe ri Polka, 19th King of Luwu) from agnatic line
- Country: Malaysia
- Current region: Selangor
- Origin: Selangor, Malaya
- Founded: 1745; 281 years ago
- Founder: Sultan Salehuddin Shah, 1st Sultan of Selangor
- Current head: Sultan Sharafuddin Idris Shah Alhaj, 9th Sultan of Selangor
- Seat: Istana Alam Shah
- Titles: Hereditary Monarchy Titles: King of Luwu; Crown Prince of Luwu; Sultan of Riau-Lingga; Crown Prince of Riau-Lingga; Sultan of Selangor; Crown Prince of Selangor; Yang di-Pertuan Besar of Selangor; Yang di-Pertuan Muda of Riau; Hereditary Royal Titles: Raja (for Men / Women); Tengku (for Men / Women); Pengiran (for Men / Women); Hereditary Noble Titles: Andi (for Men / Women); Daeng (for Men / Women)
- Styles: Monarchy Styles: His/Her Majesty; His/Her Royal Highness; Royal Styles: His / Her Highness; Noble Styles: Mr. / Tuan (for men); Mrs. / Puan (for married women / widowed women); Miss. / Cik (for unmarried women)

The House of Opu Daeng Chelak consists of the family members of the sultan of Selangor. It currently consists of Sharafuddin of Selangor and his close relations.

The sultan and his family belong to the House of Royal Buginese Riau and the House of Royal Buginese Luwu. The ruling house had founded the monarchy in 1745 and continues to be in power to this day.

== Background ==
Members of House of Opu Daeng Chelak are descendants of the first sultan of Selangor, Salehudin of Selangor. He is the eldest son of Opu Daeng Chelak, one of the five Buginese warriors that rose into power in the Johor Sultanate during the Bendahara dynasty. They are considered as the viceregal the ''House of royal Buginese Riau'' in Riau-Lingga Sultanate, and can trace their ancestry from the ''House of royal Buginese Luwu'' in Kingdom of Luwu, South Sulawesi.

On 5 November 1903, upon ascending the throne as the fifth sultan, Sulaiman of Selangor decreed that all his descendants will carry the hereditary first name Tengku instead of Raja. The naming tradition was kept to this day.

== Roles ==
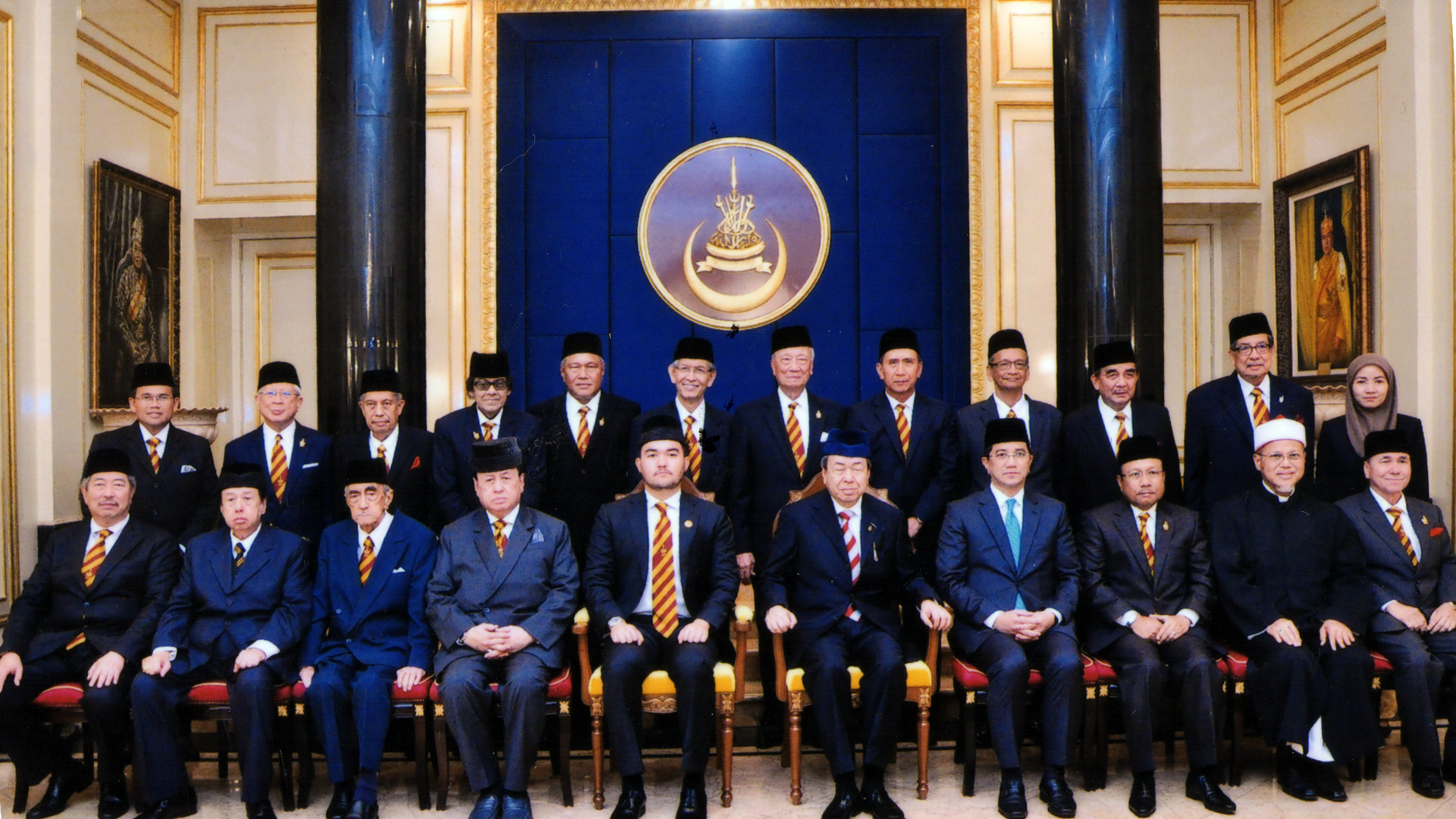
Sharafuddin of Selangor with the Selangor Council of the Royal Court members in 2016

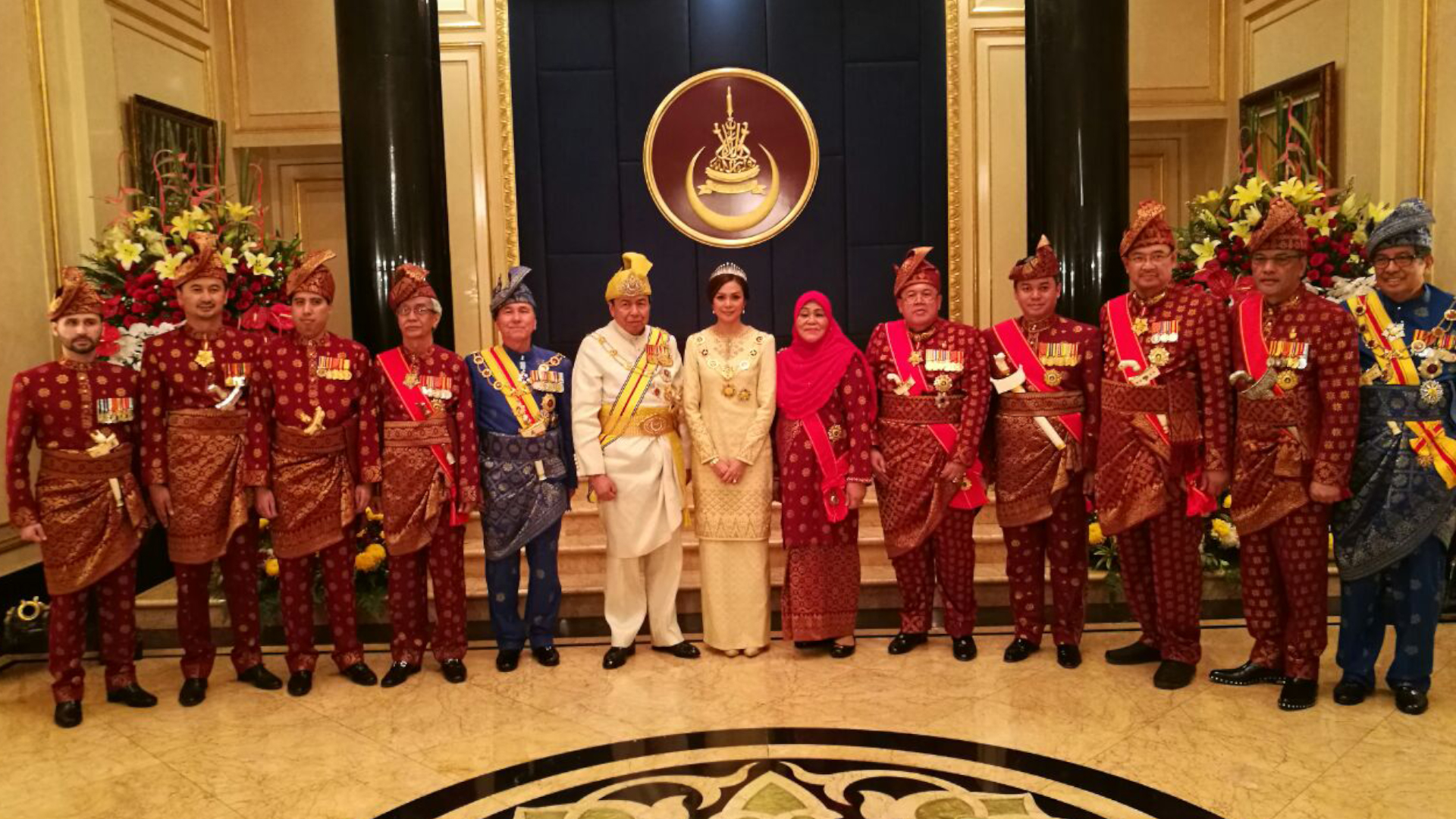
Sharafuddin of Selangor and Tengku Permaisuri Norashikin with Orang Besar Istana in 2016

Several members of the royal family are also the members of the Selangor Council of the Royal Court. The council role is to assist the Sultan in carrying out his duty to the state by acting as an advisory body to the sultan. Some members are made Orang Besar Istana or in English, palace dignitaries, whom are responsible for any engagement involving the palace.

== Titles and styles ==
The full title of the sultan of Selangor is Sultan dan Yang di-Pertuan Negeri Selangor Darul Ehsan Serta Segala Daerah Takluknya, or in English, The Sultan and Sovereign Ruler of Selangor Abode of Sincerity and its Sovereign Dependencies.

The title Tengku Ampuan Selangor may be conferred to a spouse of the sultan, given that she is of a royal descent. The title Tengku Permaisuri Selangor can be conferred instead to the spouse that is not of royal descent. The regnal name of the consort of the sultan will be the title, followed by her given name. For example: Tengku Ampuan Rahimah and Tengku Permaisuri Norashikin.

The heir apparent is conferred the title Raja Muda Selangor or in English, the Crown Prince of Selangor. His wife will receive the title Raja Puan Muda Selangor if she is of royal descent.

The sultan's mother will receive the title Paduka Bonda Raja upon his ascension to the throne. For example, Sharafuddin of Selangor's mother is styled Paduka Bonda Raja, Raja Saidatul Ihsan binti Tengku Badar Shah.

== Members ==
As of 2026, the members are:

=== Immediate family ===
- Sharafuddin of Selangor and Tengku Permaisuri Norashikin, Tengku Permaisuri Selangor (the Sultan and his consort)
  - Tengku Zerafina and Colin Salem Parbury (the Sultan's daughter and son-in-law)
  - Tengku Zatashah and Aubry Rahim Mennesson (the Sultan's daughter and son-in-law)
  - Tengku Amir Shah, Raja Muda Selangor and Datin Paduka Seri Afzaa Fadini binti Dato’ Abdul Aziz (the Sultan's son and heir apparent, and daughter-in-law)
- Permaisuri Siti Aishah (the Sultan's step-mother and Salahuddin of Selangor's widow)
- Tengku Puteri Sofiah
  - Raja Jasrill Ashrul Raja Jaafar (the Sultan's nephew)
  - Raja Jasrina Ashrinn Raja Jaafar (the Sultan's niece)
- Tengku Sulaiman Shah, Tengku Laksamana Selangor (the Sultan's brother)
  - Tengku Shakirinal Amin Mahmood Ismail Alam Shah and Puan Nadiah Khan (the Sultan's nephew and niece-in-law)
    - Tengku Mahmood (the Sultan's grandnephew)
    - Tengku Sulaiman (the Sultan's grandnephew)
    - Tengku Abdul Aziz (the Sultan's grandnephew)
    - Tengku Kamariah Khaleiyah Khadijah Kathirah Zanariah Ihsan (the Sultan's grandniece)
  - Tengku Salehuddin Ismail Iskandar Ibrahim Hishamuddin Shah, Tengku Indera Bijaya Diraja Selangor (the Sultan's nephew)
    - Tengku Ibrahim Shah (the Sultan's grandnephew)
  - Tengku Shahrain Iskandar Ismail Abdul Majid and Puan Melati Artia (the Sultan's nephew and niece-in-law)
  - Tengku Sharifuddin Ibrahim Ismail Iskandar Abdul Aziz Shah and Puan Juliana Sophie Johari Evans (the Sultan's nephew and niece-in-law)
    - Tengku Kamiliah Zanariah Ruby Ehsan Putri (the Sultan's grandniece)
    - Tengku Saidatul’Ihsan Zabedah Fauziah Putri (the Sultan's grandniece)
    - Tengku Ismail Iskandar (the Sultan's grandnephew)
  - Tengku Puteri Kathira Zanariah Ihsan Maimunah Aminah Iskandar (The Sultan's niece)
- Tengku Puteri Zahariah or Ku Yah (the Sultan's sister)
  - Syed Budriz Putra Jamalullail of Perlis, Engku Maharaja Lela Setia Paduka Selangor and Tengku Aressa Helanie of Kelantan (the Sultan's nephew and niece-in-law)
    - Syed Aqil Harryth Jamalullail of Perlis (the Sultan's grandnephew)
    - Sharifah Allyssa Hanis of Perlis (the Sultan's grandniece)
  - Sharifah Rima Irwani Jamalullail of Perlis (the Sultan's niece)
    - Wan Muhammad Khalil Putra Jamalullail of Perlis (the Sultan's grandnephew)
    - Wan Puteri Khadijah Jamalullail of Perlis (the Sultan's grandniece)
  - Sharifah Amilia Safina Jamalullail of Perlis (the Sultan's niece)
  - Adlina Syahira Amir Sharifuddin (the Sultan's grandniece)
  - Atirah Sofea Amir Sharifuddin (the Sultan's grandniece)
  - Raja Sheena Frida of Perak and Iskandar Alam bin Zainal Abidin (the Sultan's niece and nephew-in-law)
  - Megat Muhammad Faez and An-Nuura Nasuha Rasnatrazia (the Sultan's nephew and niece-in-law)
    - Mika Sulaiman Shah (the Sultan's grandnephew)
- Tengku Abdul Samad Shah, Tengku Panglima Besar Selangor (the Sultan's brother)
  - Tengku Dato’ Musahiddin Shah, Tengku Seri Perkasa Diraja Selangor and To' Puan Syazana binti Captain Haji Kelana (the Sultan's nephew and niece-in-law)
    - Tengku Alaya Saira (the Sultan's Grandniece)
  - Tengku Munazirah and Izzat Ilyas bin Muhammad Nasir (the Sultan's niece and nephew-in-law)
- Tengku Puteri Arafiah and Abdul Aziz bin Shariff (the Sultan's sister and brother-in-law)
  - Putera Azamuddin Shah (the Sultan's nephew)
- Tengku Ahmad Shah, Tengku Panglima Raja Selangor and Tunku Irinah of Negeri Sembilan, Tengku Puan Panglima Raja Selangor (the Sultan's brother and sister-in-law)
  - Tengku Alam Shah Amiruddin (the Sultan's nephew)
  - Tengku Alana Iman Shahirah and Faiz Dhiyaulhaq bin Suffian (the Sultan's niece and nephew-in-law)
- Tengku Puteri Nur Marina and Haldun Elci (the Sultan's sister and brother-in-law)
  - Atilla Elci (the Sultan's nephew)
- Tengku Puteri Nor Zehan, Tengku Puan Panglima Perlis and Syed Zainol Anwar Jamalullail, Tengku Syarif Panglima Perlis (the Sultan's sister and brother-in-law)
  - Dato' Syed Haizam Hishamuddin Putra Jamalullail of Perlis, Engku Panglima Setia Diraja Selangor and Datin Nurlin binti Dato' Seri Mohd Salleh of Perak (the Sultan's nephew and niece-in-law)
    - Sharifah Nur Alara Budriah Jamalullail (the Sultan's Grandniece)
    - Syed Azlan Salahuddin Putra Jamalullail (the Sultan's Grandnephew)
    - Sharifah Nur Zahra Hatijah Jamalullail (the Sultan's Grandniece)
    - Sharifah Nur Ilana Bainunsafia Jamalullail (the Sultan's Grandniece)
  - Syed Jufri Dhiauddin Putra Jamalullail of Perlis (the Sultan’s nephew )
    - Syed Ayden Husain Mateen Aziz Putra Jamalullail of Perlis (The Sultan's Grandnephew)
    - Tengku Ammar Shazad
  - YM Datin Dr. Sharifah Eliza Cornelia Putri Jamalullail of Perlis and YTM Dato’ Dr. Tunku Muzafar Shah bin Tunku Jaafar of Kedah (the Sultan's niece and nephew-in-law)
    - Tunku Inaya Rahimah (the Sultan's Grandniece)

=== Extended family ===
- Tengku Putra, Tengku Indera Pahlawan Diraja and Pengiran Hajah Zaliha of Brunei (the Sultan's first cousin and cousin-in-law)
  - Tengku Saidatul Rehan (the Sultan's first cousin children)
  - Tengku Saifan Rafhan, Tengku Maha Kurnia Bijaya Diraja (the Sultan's first cousin children)
  - Tengku Ainul Nur Syuhada (the Sultan's first cousin children)
- Tengku Nazri (the Sultan's cousin)
- Tengku Puteri Insani (the Sultan's cousin)
- Tengku Shamsulbhari and Tengku Zubaidah binti Tengku Mohammad (the Sultan's cousin and cousin-in-law)
- Tengku Hishamuddin Zaizi and Datin Hezeita binti Muhammad Hafidz (the Sultan's cousin and cousin-in-law)
- Tengku Puteri Saidatul Aini (the Sultan's cousin)
- Tengku Rashad, Engku Orang Kaya Diraja Selangor (the Sultan's cousin)
- Tengku Anisha (the Sultan's cousin)
- Tengku Lutfi (the Sultan's cousin)
- Tengku Sakinah (the Sultan's cousin)
- Tengku Shukri (the Sultan's cousin)
- Tengku Narima (the Sultan's cousin)
- Tengku Muhammad Najib (the Sultan's cousin)
- Tengku Iskandar, Tengku Seri Andika Diraja Selangor (the Sultan's cousin)
- Tengku Badariah (the Sultan's cousin)
- Tengku Aina (the Sultan's cousin)
- Tengku Nur Anuwar (the Sultan's grandaunt)
- Tengku Mahmud Shah Al-Haj (the Sultan's granduncle)
- Tengku Ardy Esfandiari, Tengku Seri Paduka Shah Bandar and To' Puan Siti Rahilah Mohd Hashim (the Sultan's first cousin once removed and first cousin-in-law)
  - Tengku Ezrique Ezzuddean, Tengku Orang Kaya Menteri Diraja and To' Puan Syamim Mohd Farid (the Sultan's second cousin and second cousin-in-law)
  - Tengku Ezzer Ezzaruddean, Bentara Raja and Juliana Razman (the Sultan's second cousin and second cousin-in-law)
  - Tengku Ezran Ezzaeddean and Nur Syazana Mustakim (the Sultan's second cousin and second cousin-in-law)

== See also ==
- Tengku Zafrul Aziz
- Nick Kyrgios
- Line of succession to the Malaysian thrones#Selangor
- Family tree of Selangor monarchs
- List of honours of the Selangor royal family by country
- Kingdom of Luwu
- South Sulawesi
- Sulawesi
