= Xenia (name) =

Female given name

- Gender: Female
- Name day: Czech Republic: November 27; Finland: January 24; Greece: January 24; Hungary: July 30; Poland: April 16; Russia: February 6; Slovakia: June 2

Origin
- Origin: Greek
- Meaning: "foreigner", "outlander", "welcomed guest" "hospitality"

Other names
- Variant forms: Ksenia, Kseniia, Ksenija, Xenija
- Related names: Oksana, Senja

Xenia (variants include Ksenia, Kseniia, Ksenija, Kseniya; derived from Greek Ξένια xenia, "hospitality") (Note: Other sources point the word ξένος [ksénos], 'foreigner', as the origin of the name. This would be equivalent to the Latin name Barbara which also means 'foreigner'.) is a female given name. The below sections list notable people with one of the variants of this given name.

Related names include Oksana (Ukrainian: Оксана; Belarusian: Аксана, Russian: Оксана), Ksenija (Slovenia, Croatia, Lithuania; Ксенија, Serbia, Montenegro, North Macedonia); Kseniya (Bulgarian: Ксения); Xénia (Hungary), and Senja (Finland). In Spain, although it started to become more popular during the 1990s, it appears mainly in Galician as Xenia [ˈʃenia], and in Catalan as Xènia [ˈʃɛniə].

== Ksenia ==
=== Actresses ===
- Ksenia Alfyorova (born 1974), Bulgarian-born actress and television presenter in Russia
- Ksenia Khairova (born 1969), Russian stage and film actress
- Ksenia Solo (born 1987), Latvian-Canadian actress
- Ksenia Daniela Kharlamova (born 2002), Canadian actress

=== Artistic gymnasts ===
- Ksenia Afanasyeva (born 1991), Russian artistic gymnast
- Ksenia Dudkina (born 1995), Russian group rhythmic gymnast
- Ksenia Dzhalaganiya (born 1985), Russian group rhythmic gymnast
- Ksenia Kamkova (born 2002), Russian artistic gymnast
- Ksenia Klimenko (born 2003), Russian artistic gymnast
- Ksenia Polyakova (born 2000), Russian group rhythmic gymnast
- Ksenia Sankovich (born 1990), Belarusian rhythmic gymnast
- Ksenia Semyonova (born 1992), Russian artistic gymnast

=== Badminton players ===
- Ksenia Evgenova (born 1996), Russian badminton player
- Ksenia Polikarpova (born 1990), Russian-Israeli badminton player

=== Footballers (soccer players) ===
- Ksenia Garanina (born 1997), Russian-Armenian footballer
- Ksenia Khairulina (born 1997), Kazakhstani footballer
- Ksenia Tsybutovich (born 1987), Russian footballer

=== Ice skaters / ice dancers ===
- Ksenia Antonova (born 1990), Russian ice dancer
- Ksenia Caesar (1889 – after 1939), Russian ice skater
- Ksenia Doronina (born 1990), Russian ice skater
- Ksenia Konkina (born 2001), Russian ice dancer
- Ksenia Krasilnikova (born 1991), Russian ice skater
- Ksenia Makarova (born 1992), Russian-American ice skater
- Ksenia Monko (born 1992), Russian ice dancer
- Ksenia Ozerova (born 1991), Russian ice skater
- Ksenia Pecherkina (born 1993), Latvian ice dancer
- Ksenia Smetanenko (born 1979), Russian-Armenia ice skater
- Ksenia Stolbova (born 1992), Russian ice skater

=== Models ===
- Ksenia Kahnovich (born 1987), Russian fashion model
- Ksenia Kuprina (1908–1981), French model and actress
- Ksenia Sukhinova (born 1987), Russian model, television host, and beauty queen; Miss World 2008

=== Singers ===
- Ksenia Novikova (born 1980), Russian singer
- Ksenia Sitnik (born 1995), Belarusian singer
- Ksenija Knežević (born 1996), Montenegrin singer

=== Tennis players ===
- Ksenia Aleshina (born 2003), Russian tennis player
- Ksenia Efremova (born 2009), French tennis player
- Ksenia Gaydarzhi (born 1995), Russian tennis player
- Ksenia Lykina (born 1990), Russian tennis player
- Ksenia Milevskaya (born 1990), Belarusian tennis player
- Ksenia Palkina (born 1989), Russian tennis player
- Ksenia Pervak (born 1991), Russian tennis player

=== Other sports ===
- Ksenia Alopina (born 1992), Russian alpine ski racer
- Ksenia Chernykh (fl. 2006–2010), Russian mountain biker
- Ksenia Chibisova (born 1988), Russian judoka
- Ksenia Kablukova (born 1998), Russian ski jumper
- Ksenia Kurach (born 1997), Russian sprint canoeist
- Ksenia Ovsyannikova (born 1985), Russian wheelchair fencer
- Ksenia Parubets (born 1994), Russian volleyball player
- Ksenia Perova (born 1989), Russian archer
- Ksenia Popova (born 1988), Russian open water swimmer
- Ksenia Tikhonenko (born 1993), Russian basketball player
- Ksenia Zadorina (born 1987), Russian sprinter
- Ksenia Zakordonskaya (born 2003), Russian handballer
- Ksenia Zsikhotska (born 1989), Ukrainian dancer and choreographer

=== Other non-sporting ===
- Ksenia Anske (born 1976), Russian-born American author of short fiction and novels
- Ksenia Goryacheva (born 1996), Russian political figure
- Ksenia Kepping (1937–2002), Russian linguist
- Ksenia Milicevic (born 1942), French painter, architect and town planner
- Ksenia Pokrovsky (1942–2013), Russian-American religious painter
- Ksenia Aleksandrovna Razumova (born 1931), Russian physicist
- Ksenia Schnaider, Ukrainian clothing designer
- Ksenia Sobchak (born 1981), Russian public figure, TV anchor, and journalist
- Ksenia Svetlova (born 1977), Israeli politician and journalist

== Kseniia ==
- Kseniia Akhanteva (born 2002), Russian pair skater
- Kseniia Aleksandrova (born 2000), Uzbekistani rhythmic gymnast
- Kseniia Krimer (born 1992), Russian water polo player
- Kseniia Levchenko (born 1996), Russian basketball player
- Kseniia Levkovska (born 1989), Ukrainian triathlete
- Kseniia Sinitsyna (born 2004), Russian figure skater
- Kseniia Tsymbalyuk (born 1997), Russian road and track cyclist
- Kseniia Zastavska, Ukrainian poet, writer and screenwriter

== Ksenija ==
=== Actresses ===
- Ksenija Marinković (born 1966), Croatian film, television and theatre actress
- Ksenija Pajić (born 1961), Croatian actress

=== Singers ===
- Ksenija Knežević (born 1996), Serbian-Montenegrin singer
- Ksenija Milošević (born 1982), Serbian singer
- Ksenija Pajčin (1977–2010), Serbian singer and model; sometimes referred to as Xenia or Xenija

=== Sports ===
- Ksenija Balta (born 1986), Estonian long jumper, sprinter, and heptathlete
- Ksenija Jastsenjski (born 1982), Serbian figure skater
- Ksenija Predikaka (born 1970), Slovenian long jumper
- Ksenija Voishal (born 1994), Belarusian basketball player

=== Other ===
- Ksenija Atanasijević (1894–1981), Serbian philosopher
- Ksenija Bulatović (born 1967), Serbian architect
- Ksenija Lukich (born 1990), Serbian-Australian model
- Ksenija Pavlovic, Belgrade-born American journalist and author
- Ksenija Sidorova (born 1988), Latvian accordionist
- Ksenija Turković (born 1964), Croatian jurist
- Ksenija Zečević (1956–2006), Serbian pianist

== Kseniya ==
=== Actresses ===
- Kseniya Alexandrova (born 1994), Russian model and actress
- Kseniya Borodina (born 1983), Russian television presenter and actress
- Kseniya Kachalina (born 1971), Russian actress
- Kseniya Kutepova (born 1971), Russian actress
- Kseniya Mishyna (born 1989), Ukrainian film and stage actress
- Kseniya Rappoport (born 1974), Russian actress

=== Footballers ===
- Kseniya Kovalenko (born 1990), Russian footballer
- Kseniya Senina (fl. 2010), Uzbekistani footballer

=== Handballers ===
- Kseniya Makeyeva (born 1990), Russian handballer
- Kseniya Milova (born 1992), Russian handballer
- Kseniya Nikandrova (born 1987), Kazakhstani handballer

=== Runners / sprinters ===
- Kseniya Agafonova (born 1983), Russian long-distance runner
- Kseniya Aksyonova (born 1988), Russian sprinter
- Kseniya Karandyuk (born 1986), Ukrainian sprinter
- Kseniya Ryzhova (born 1987), Russian sprinter

=== Other sports ===
- Kseniya Baylo (born 2005), Ukrainian diver
- Kseniya Dobrynina (born 1994), Russian racing cyclist
- Kseniya Dziatsuk (born 1986), Belarusian triple jumper
- Kseniya Grigoreva (born 1987), Uzbekistani alpine skier
- Kseniya Liabiodkina (born 2002), Belarusian volleyball player
- Kseniya Markitantova (born 1981), Ukrainian Paralympic archer
- Kseniya Moskvina (born 1989), Russian swimmer
- Kseniya Moustafaeva (born 1995), Belarus-born French rhythmic gymnast
- Kseniya Pantelyeyeva (born 1994), Ukrainian fencer
- Kseniya Sadouskaya (born 1991), Belarusian speed skater
- Kseniya Stankevich (born 1996), Belarusian freestyle wrestler
- Kseniya Sydorenko (born 1986), Ukrainian synchronized swimmer
- Ksenyia Tuhai (born 1995), Belarusian cyclist
- Kseniya Zikunkova (born 1979), Belarusian biathlete

=== Other non-sporting ===
- Kseniya Boguslavskaya (1892–1972), Russian artist
- Kseniya Garaschuk (born 1982), Minsk-born Canadian mathematician
- Kseniya Konstantinova (1925–1943), Red Army medic and Hero of the Soviet Union
- Kseniya Ryabinkina, Russian ballet dancer
- Kseniya Simonova (born 1985), Ukrainian artist
- Kseniya Yorsh (born 1990), Belarusian-born film producer in the United States

== Xenia ==
=== Actresses ===
- Xenia Desni (1894–1962), Ukrainian actress of the silent era
- Xenia Goodwin (born 1994), Australian actress and dancer
- Xenia Gratsos (1940–2018), Greek-American actress
- Xenia Kalogeropoulou (born 1936), Greek actress
- Xenia Seeberg (born 1967), German film and television actress
- Xenia Valderi (1921–2008), Yugoslav-born Italian actress

=== Aristocrats ===
- Grand Duchess Xenia Alexandrovna of Russia (1875–1960), sister of Tsar Nicholas II
- Princess Xenia Georgievna of Russia (1903–1965), daughter of Grand Duke George Mihailovich of Russia
- Princess Xenia of Montenegro (1887–1960), daughter of Nicholas I of Montenegro
- Xenia of Yaroslavl (died c. 1290), regent of Yaroslavl
- Xenia Borisovna (1582–1622), daughter of Tsar Boris Godunov

=== Dancers ===
- Xenia Borovansky (1903–1985), Russian-born dancer and choreographer, based in Australia after 1939
- Xenia Makletzova (1892–1974), Russian ballet dancer
- Xenia Zarina (1903–1967), American dancer

=== Musicians ===
- Xenia Jankovic (born 1958), Serbian-Russian cellist
- Xenia Boodberg Lee (1927–2004), American pianist
- Xénia Maliarevitch (born 1980), French classical pianist

=== Religious figures ===
- Saint Xenia (disambiguation), several people
- Xenia of Rome (died c. 450), saint of the 5th century
- Xenia of Saint Petersburg (c. 1719–1730 – c. 1803), patron saint

=== Singers ===
- Xenia (singer) (born 1994; Xenia Edith Martinez), singer on the TV series The Voice
- Xenia Belmas (1890–1981), Ukrainian soprano
- Xênia França (born 1986), Brazilian singer-songwriter
- Xenia Rubinos (born 1985), American singer-songwriter

=== Swimmers ===
- Xenia Palazzo (born 1998), Italian Paralympic swimmer
- Xenia Peni (born 1983), Papua New Guinean swimmer

=== Volleyball players ===
- Xenia Ivanov (born 1970), Romanian volleyball player
- Xenia Staffelbach (born 1998), Swiss volleyball player

=== Other sports ===
- Xenia Estrada (born 1990), Salvadoran cyclist
- Xenia Georgiou (born 1988), Cypriot footballer
- Xenia Knoll (born 1992), Swiss tennis player
- Xénia Krizsán (born 1993), Hungarian heptathlete
- Xénia Siska (born 1957), Hungarian hurdler
- Xenia Smits (born 1994), Belgian-born German handballer
- Xenia Stad-de Jong (1922–2012), Dutch sprinter

=== Other non-sporting ===
- Xenia, name given by Bryan Sykes to a theoretical founding ancestor of Haplogroup X (mtDNA)
- Xenia Cage (1913–1995), American surrealist sculptor
- Xenia Deli (born 1989), Moldovan-American model
- Xenia Denikina (1892–1973), Russian writer
- Xenia Dyakonova (born 1965), Russian poet and translator
- Xenia Ghali (born 1989), Greek songwriter, record producer and disc jockey
- Xenia Hausner (born 1951), Austrian painter and stage designer
- Xenia de la Ossa (born 1958), Costa Rican physicist
- Xenia Shestova (1560–1631), Russian nun and mother of Mikhail I of Russia
- Xenia Wickett, British-American executive coach and international advisor

=== Fictional characters ===
- Xenia Onatopp, in the 1995 action spy film GoldenEye, played by Famke Janssen

== Other variants ==
- Aksinya Sergeeva (1726–1756), Russian ballerina
- Ksenya Stepanycheva (born 1978), Russian playwright
- Xenija Melnik (born 2001), German politician
- Xeniya Volnukhina (born 1982), Kazakhstani handballer
- Xènius, male version, nom de plume of Eugenio d'Ors
- Zenia Stampe (born 1979), Danish politician

== See also ==
- All pages with titles starting with:,,,,
- All pages with titles containing:,,,,
- Xenia (disambiguation)
- Xena (disambiguation)
- Xene
