= Melnik (surname) =

Melnik, Melnick or Melnyk (Russian or Ukrainian: Мельник; Belarusian: Мельнік) is a gender-neutral Slavic occupational surname literally meaning 'miller'. The surname may refer to:

== Sports ==
- Bohdan Melnyk (born 1997), Ukrainian footballer
- Boris Melnik (1945–2016), Soviet sports shooter
- Evgenia Melnik (born 1988), Belarusian figure skater
- Faina Melnyk (1945–2016), Ukrainian discus thrower
- Galina Melnik (born 1970), Russian table tennis player
- Gerry Melnyk (1934–2001), Canadian ice hockey player
- Ihor Melnyk (disambiguation) – multiple footballers
- Ivan Melnik (born 1991), Russian footballer
- Larry Melnyk (born 1960), Canadian ice hockey player
- Marharyta Melnyk (born 2010), Ukrainian rhythmic gymnast
- Oleksandr Melnyk (born 2000), Ukrainian footballer
- Olga Melnik (born 1974), Russian biathlete
- Roman Melnik (born 1977), Russian footballer
- Serhiy Melnyk (disambiguation), multiple footballers
- Steve Melnyk (born 1947), American golfer
- Tetyana Melnyk (born 1995), Ukrainian sprinter and hurdler
- Vadym Melnyk (born 1980), Ukrainian footballer
- Viktor Melnyk (born 1980), Ukrainian footballer
- Vitaliy Melnik, Soviet luger
- Yona Melnik (born 1949), Israeli judoka

== Business and politics ==
- Andriy Melnyk (disambiguation) – several people
- Christine Melnick (born 1950), Canadian politician
- Emma of Mělník (died 1005/06), Bohemian duchess
- Eugene Melnyk (1959–2022), Canadian businessman and sports team owner
- John L. Melnick (1935–2013), American lawyer and politician from Virginia
- Joseline Peña-Melnyk (born 1966), American politician
- Nicholas Melnyk (1912–1973), Canadian politician
- Stanislav Melnyk (1961–2015), Ukrainian politician
- Valentyna Melnyk (born 1978), New Zealand marketing academic
- Xenija Melnik (born 2001), German politician

== Arts and media ==
- Aleksandr Melnik (1958–2021), Russian film director
- Allison Melnick (born 1971), American socialite and reality TV star
- Anton Melnik, Russian film producer
- Cameron Melnyk, Canadian singer
- Daniel Melnick (1932–2009), American film producer
- David Melnick (1938–2022), American poet
- Elena Melnik (born 1986), Russian fashion model
- Ion Melnik (1935–2018), Russian music composer
- Jeff Melnyk, Canadian electronic music producer
- Lola Melnick (born 1982), Chilean vedette and TV personality
- Lubomyr Melnyk (born 1948), composer and pianist of Ukrainian origin
- Mykhailo Melnyk (1944–1979), Ukrainian historian and poet
- Mitch Melnick (born 1959), Canadian radio sports announcer
- Natasha Melnick (born 1984), American actress
- Peter Rodgers Melnick (born 1958), American composer
- Yaroslav Melnyk (born 1959), Ukrainian/Lithuanian novelist, philosopher and critic

== Pilots ==
- Bruce E. Melnick (born 1949), American pilot and astronaut
- Mykola Melnyk (1953–2013), Soviet-Ukrainian pilot

== Science ==
- Don Melnick (1953–2019), American biologist
- George Melnyk, Canadian historian, academic, and writer
- Joseph L. Melnick (1914–2001), American epidemiologist
- Rafi Melnick, Israeli economist and academic administrator
- Roderick Melnik, Canadian-Australian mathematician
- Tatiana Botkina-Melnik (1898–1986), Russian nurse
- Vijaya Melnick (born 1937), American biologist
- Volodymyr Melnyk (born 1952), Ukrainian academic and philosopher

== Fiction ==
- Danielle Melnick, fictional character on the television series Law & Order
- Herb Melnick, fictional character on the television series Two and a Half Men
