= Xene =

Xene (Greek: Ξένη) is a feminine Greek name, literally meaning "stranger" but having since late antiquity the sense of "devoted to separation from the world". The masculine form is Xenos. It was commonly adopted by women who retired to monasteries and became nuns late in life.

Women who took the name Xene include:

- Saint Xene (5th century), born Eusebeia
- Catherine of Bulgaria (fl. 1057–1056)
- Irene of Alania (fl. c. 1072)
- Irene of Hungary (died 1134)
- Maria of Antioch (died 1182)
- Irene Komnene Doukaina (fl. 1238–1241)
- Rita of Armenia (died 1333)
- Xene Philantropene, granddaughter of Theodora Palaiologina Synadene

== See also ==
- Xenia (name)
