= Oksana =

Female given name

Oksana, Oxana, or Aksana (Ukrainian: Оксана; Belarusian: Аксана, Russian: Оксана), is a female given name of Ukrainian origin. The closest equivalent is the Russian name Kseniya (Russian: Ксения), but the two names coexist in use in both countries, and neither of them is a shortening of the other.

== Origin ==
The names Oksana (Russian: Оксана, romanized: Oxana), Xana (Russian: Ксана, romanized: Xana), Sana (Russian: Сана, romanized: Sana) and Kseniya (Russian: Ксения, romanized: Xenia) are thought to originate from one of two Greek words: Xenia (hospitality) or Xenos (stranger). Axana is another alternative spelling.

== People ==
=== Oksana ===
- Oksana Akinshina (born 1987), Russian actress
- Oksana Wilhelmsson (born 1984 as Oksana Andersson), Soviet Union-born member of Swedish band Sunblock
- Oksana Andrusina-Mert (born 1973), Turkish discus thrower of Russian origin
- Oksana Baiul (born 1977), Ukrainian Olympic and world champion figure skater
- Oksana Bilozir (born 1957), Ukrainian singer and stateswoman
- Oksana Chibisova (born 1977), Russian shot putter
- Oksana Chusovitina (born 1975), Uzbek gymnast
- Oksana Dobrovolskaja (born 1996), Lithuanian para-athlete
- Oksana Domnina (born 1984), Russian ice dancer
- Oksana Dyka (born 1978), Ukrainian opera soprano
- Oksana Epel (born 1972), Ukrainian judge
- Oksana Esipchuk (born 1976), Russian discus thrower
- Oksana Fadeyeva (née Kushch) (born 1975), Russian table tennis player
- Oksana Grigorieva (born 1970), Russian musician
- Oksana Grishina (born 1968), Russian Olympic track cyclist
- Oksana Grishina (born 1978), Russian former gymnast and current professional fitness competitor
- Oksana Grishuk (born 1972), Russian figure skater
- Oksana Hatamkhanova (born 1990), Olympic swimmer from Azerbaijan
- Oksana Ilyushkina née Kochetkova (born 1974), retired Ukrainian athlete
- Oksana Ivanenko (1906–1997), Ukrainian children's writer and translator
- Oksana Kalashnikova (born 1990), Georgian professional tennis player
- Oksana Kazakova (born 1975), Russian figure skater
- Oksana Khvostenko (born 1977), Ukrainian biathlete
- Oksana Klimova (born 1992), Russian ice dancer
- Oksana Kondratyeva (born 1985), Russian hammer thrower
- Oksana Krechunyak (born 1981), paralympic athlete from Ukraine
- Oksana Kurt (or Parkhomenko, born 1984), Azerbaijani volleyball player
- Oksana Lada, Ukrainian actress and model (also known as 'Oksana Babiy')
- Oksana Lyapina (born 1980), Russian gymnast
- Oksana Lyniv (born 1978), Ukrainian conductor
- Oksana Makar (1993–2012), Ukrainian murder victim
- Oksana Masters (born 1989), Ukrainian-born American Paralympic rower
- Oksana Nabatchikova (born 1972), Russian politician
- Oksana Okunyeva (born 1990), Ukrainian high jumper
- Oksana Omelianchik (born 1970), former Soviet gymnast
- Oksana Petrusenko (born Kseniya Borodavkina, 1900–1940), Ukrainian opera singer of the Soviet era
- Oksana Platero (born 1988), Russian ballroom dancer
- Oksana Pochepa (born 1984), Russian pop singer
- Oksana Potdykova (born 1979), former competitive Russian ice dancer
- Oksana Rogova, Russian triple jumper
- Oksana Savchuk, (born 1983), Ukrainian politician
- Oksana Shcherbak née Holodkova (born 1982), Ukrainian sprint athlete
- Oksana Shachko (1987–2018), Ukrainian artist and founder of feminist group FEMEN
- Oksana Serikova (born 1985), Ukrainian swimmer
- Oksana Shvets (1955–2022), Ukrainian actress
- Oksana Skaldina (born 1972), Ukrainian rhythmic gymnast
- Oksana Udmurtova (born 1982), Russian athlete
- Oksana Vashchuk (born 1989), Ukrainian freestyle wrestler
- Oksana Voevodina (born 1992), Russian model, 2015 Miss Moscow winner and former wife of Muhammad V of Kelantan, Malaysia
- Oksana Yarygina (born 1972), Russian javelin thrower
- Oksana Yermakova (born 1973), Estonian and Russian Olympic champion épée fencer
- Oksana Yeremeyeva (née Ryabinicheva, 1990), Russian football defender
- Oksana Zabuzhko (born 1960), Ukrainian writer and poet
- Oksana Zbrozhek (born 1978), Russian middle-distance runner
- Oksana Zubkovska, Ukrainian Paralympian athlete

=== Oxana ===
- Oxana Fedorova or Oksana Fedorova (born 1977), Russian television presenter and Miss Universe 2002
- Oxana Malaya or Oksana Malaya (born 1983), Ukrainian feral child
- Oxana Savchenko or Oksana Savchenko (born 1990), Russian paraolympic swimmer
- Oxana Shevchenko or Oksana Shevchenko (born 1987), Kazakh classical pianist
- Oxana Slivenko or Oksana Slivenko (born 1986), Russian weightlifter

=== Aksana ===
- Aksana (wrestler) (born 1982), Lithuanian professional wrestler
- Aksana Drahun (born 1981), Belarusian sprinter
- Aksana Dziamidava (born 1993), Belarusian swimmer
- Aksana Kavalchuk (born 1979), Belarusian volleyball player
- Aksana Miankova (born 1982), Belarusian hammer thrower
- Aksana Papko, (born 1988), Belarusian track cyclist
- Aksana Sivitskaya, Belarusian paralympic athlete

== Fictional characters ==
- Oxana Vorontsova (in the 2018 novel Codename Villanelle) or Oksana Astankova (in the television series Killing Eve), birth name of fictional assassin Villanelle
- Oksa Pollock in the French children's fantasy series
- Oksana, character in Marco Polo
- Oxana (also known as Kodira), an NPC in actual play podcast The Adventure Zone Ethersea
- Oksana, character in Nikolai Gogol's short story Christmas Eve
- Oksana, name of the Brass Beast mini gun owned by heavy in Team fortress two
- Oksana, second wife of Borat Sagdiyev in the satirical movie Borat.
- Oxana Hauntley, from Vampirina
- Oxanna Kristos, character in Command & Conquer: Tiberian Sun
