= Saint Xenia =

Saint Xenia is the name of:

- Xenia of Peloponnesus (318), May 3, Greek saint, great martyr and wonderworker
- Xenia of Rome (5th-century), January 24, Roman saint
- Irene of Hungary (1088–1134), took the religious name Xenia, wife of Emperor John II Comnenus
- Xenia of Tarusa (c. 1246–1312), Russian Orthodox saint and Grand Princess of Vladimir
- Xenia of Saint Petersburg (c. 1719–1803), January 24, Russian Orthodox saint
