= January 24 (Eastern Orthodox liturgics) =

Day in the Eastern Orthodox liturgical calendar

Eastern Orthodox liturgical calendar
January 23	January 24	January 25
January 24 O.S. ≍ February 6 N.S. January 24 N.S ≍ January 11 O.S.

An Eastern Orthodox cross

January 24 in Eastern Orthodox liturgical calendars is a feast day and a day of commemoration of saints and martyrs. Although some Orthodox churches use the Revised Julian Calendar and others use the traditional Julian calendar, the fixed commemorations for their respective January 24 are broadly the same, no matter which calendar is used. (Note: Despite the dates being the same, the days to which they refer typically differ by 13 days. The notation Old Style or O.S. is sometimes used to indicate a date in the traditional Julian Calendar (the "Old Calendar"). The notation New Style or N.S, indicates a date in the Revised Julian calendar (the "New Calendar").)

== Saints ==
- Hieromartyr Babylas of Sicily, and his two disciples Martyrs Timothy and Agapius (3rd century)
- Martyrs Paul, Pausirius, and Theodotian, brothers, of Egypt (3rd century)
- Hieromartyr Philippikos (Philippicus, Philip) the Presbyter and Martyr Barsimos of Syria and his two brothers, by the sword, in Persia.
- Martyr Chrysoploki (Chrysoploca). (Note: It is unknown where and when the holy martyr Chrysoploki was martyred. Her memory is recorded in the "Patmiako" Codex, together with martyr Theodoulis.)
- Saint Helladios the Commentarisius (prison warden). (see also: January 18)
- Martyrs Hermogenes and Menas (Mamas, Mamatos). (see also: December 10)
- Saints Hermogenes and Philemon, Bishop of Karpathos. (Note: Their memory is recorded in the "Patmiako" Codex.)
- Venerable Macedonius of Syria, hermit of Mt. Silpius, near Antioch (c. 420)
- Saint Xenia (Eusebia) the Righteous, Deaconess of Rome, and her two female slaves (c. 450)
- Saint Philon (Philonas, Philo), Wonderworking Bishop of Karpasia (Carpasia) on Cyprus (5th century)
- Venerable Zosimas, ascetic of the desert.
- Saint Zosimas of Cilicia, Bishop of Babylon in Egypt (6th century)
- Saint Macarius.

== Pre-Schism Western saints ==
- Saint Felician, Bishop of Foligno, Italy (254) (Note: Born in Foligno in Italy, he was consecrated bishop and cared for his diocese for over fifty years, enlightening the whole of Umbria. He was arrested under Decius and died on his way to martyrdom in Rome.)
- Saint Zamas, first Bishop of Bologna, Italy (c. 268) (Note: "At Bologna, St. Zamas, the first bishop of that city, who was consecrated by pope St. Denis, and there wonderfully propagated the Christian faith.")
- Saint Artemius (Arthemius), Bishop of Clermont (396) (Note: An imperial legate who, on his way to Spain, fell sick in Gaul and settled in Clermont in Auvergne in France where eventually he became bishop.)
- Saint Exuperantius, Bishop of Cingoli near Ancona, Italy (5th century)
- Saint Guasacht, converted by Patrick, whom he helped as Bishop of Granard in Ireland (5th century)
- Saint Lupicinus of Lipidiaco, Gaul (500)
- Venerable Martyr Cadoc (Docus, Cathmael, Cadvaci), founder of the monastery of Llancarfan not far from Cardiff in Wales, and hermit (c. 580) (Note: Founder of the monastery of Llancarfan not far from Cardiff in Wales, he later lived as a hermit on an island off the coast of Vannes in Brittany. He returned to Britain and by tradition was martyred by heathen near Weedon in England.)
- Saint Suranus, Abbot of a monastery at Sora near Caserta, martyred by the Lombards (c. 580) (Note: Abbot of a monastery at Sora near Caserta in Italy, who gave away all the goods of the monastery to refugees from the Lombards. When the latter arrived and found that nothing remained to plunder, they martyred Suranus on the spot.)
- Saint Bertrand (Bertram, Bertran, Ebertram), a disciple of Saint Bertinus, helped Saint Omer enlighten the north of France and Flanders, later became Abbot of Saint-Quentin (7th century)
- Saint Erembert I, Abbot of Kremsmünster Abbey in Austria (c. 1050)

== Post-Schism Orthodox saints ==
- Venerable Neophytus the Recluse of Cyprus, Wonderworker (1204)
- Saint Gerasimus, Bishop of Perm (1441) (Note: See: (in Russian) Герасим (епископ Пермский). Википедии. (Russian Wikipedia).)
- Blessed Xenia of Saint Petersburg, Fool for Christ (1806)
- Saint Sophia, first Abbess of Shamordino Convent (1888)

=== New martyrs and confessors ===
- New Martyr John of Kazan (1529) (Note: See: (in Russian) Иоанн Казанский. Википедии. (Russian Wikipedia).)
- Saint Valentina Sulkovskaya of Minsk, Belarus (1966) (Note: See: (in Russian) Валентина Минская. Википедии. (Russian Wikipedia).)

== Other commemorations ==
- Translation of the relics (632) of Venerable Martyr Anastasius the Persian (628)
- Dedication of the Church of St. Zacharias, in Constantinople, founded by St. Domnica of Constantinople (5th century)
- Dedication of the Church of the Holy Prophet and Forerunner John the Baptist, near Taurus.
- Commemoration of the Seven Venerable Saints of Philotheou monastery:

- Philotheos, master builder of the monastery (10th century)
- Theodosius of Mount Athos, Abbott of Philotheou Monastery and Metropolitan of Trebizond (1392) (see also: January 11)
- Dionysius of Olympus, and Mount Athos, Wonderworker (1541) (Note: See: (in Greek) Άγιος Διονύσιος ο εν Ολύμπω. Βικιπαίδεια. (Greek Wikipedia).) (see also: January 23)
- Damianos of Philotheou and Kissavos, at Larissa (1568) (see also: February 14)
- Dometius the Hesychast, of Philotheou Monastery on Mount Athos, the "standard-bearer", and wonderworker (after 1568) (see also: August 7)
- Symeon the Barefoot, of Philotheou Monastery, Mount Athos (1594) (see also: April 19)
- Kosmas of Aetolia, Equal to the Apostles (1779) (see also: August 24)

- Synaxis of Saints Who Taught and Studied at the Orthodox Theological Faculty of the University of Belgrade (2024) (Note: "Summary: With the blessing of the Serbian Patriarch Mr Porfirije was approved the commemoration of the Saints who taught and were taught at the Theological College in Belgrade (Faculty of Orthodox Theology – University of Belgrade). The aim of this contribution is to indicate which saints were professors or students of the Orthodox Theological Faculty in Belgrade, based on the primary source of material from the archives of the Orthodox Theological Faculty and with the help of relevant literature. With the faculty, from the beginning of its work in 1920, and through the next two and a half decades, the names of numerous saints who were later glorified in the Orthodox Church were connected. The name of Saint Irinej Ćirić (sr) is associated with the beginnings of the faculty. Saint Justin Popović taught comparative theology and dogmatics for almost an entire decade. Among the students were: bishops Jovan Maksimović and Varnava Nastić, hieromonks Jovan Rapajić and Mihailo Đusić (sr) from Žica , priest-martyrs Nedeljko Streličić, Luka Vukmanović (sr), Vladimir Petržek (sr) and many others, who suffered during the World War II.")
- Repose of Bishop Nektary (Kontzevitch) of Seattle (1983) (Note: See: (in Russian) Нектарий (Концевич). Википедии. (Russian Wikipedia).)

== Icon gallery ==
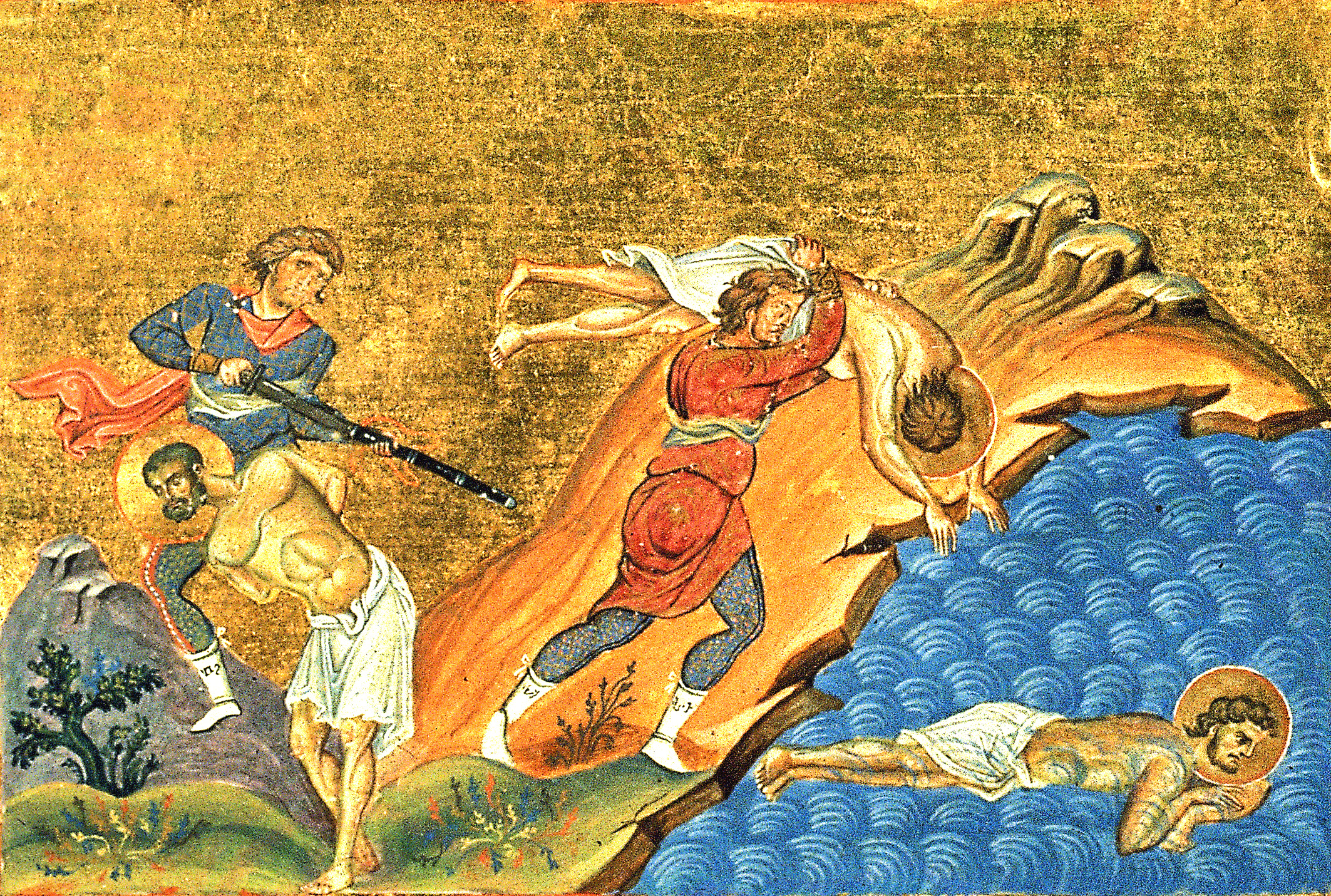
Martyrs Paul, Pausirius, and Theodotian, brothers, of Egypt.
(Menologion of Basil II, 10th century).

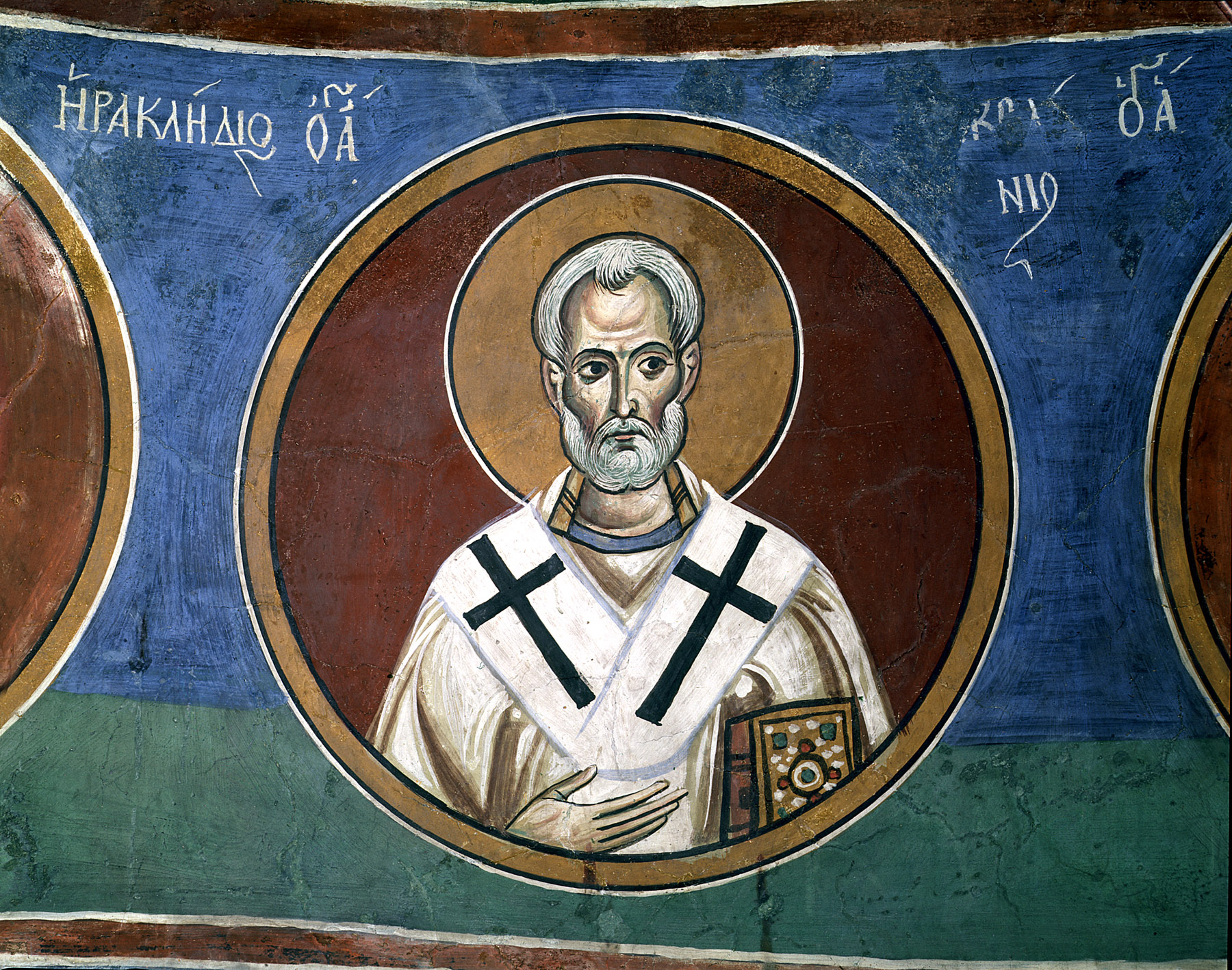
Venerable Macedonius of Syria.

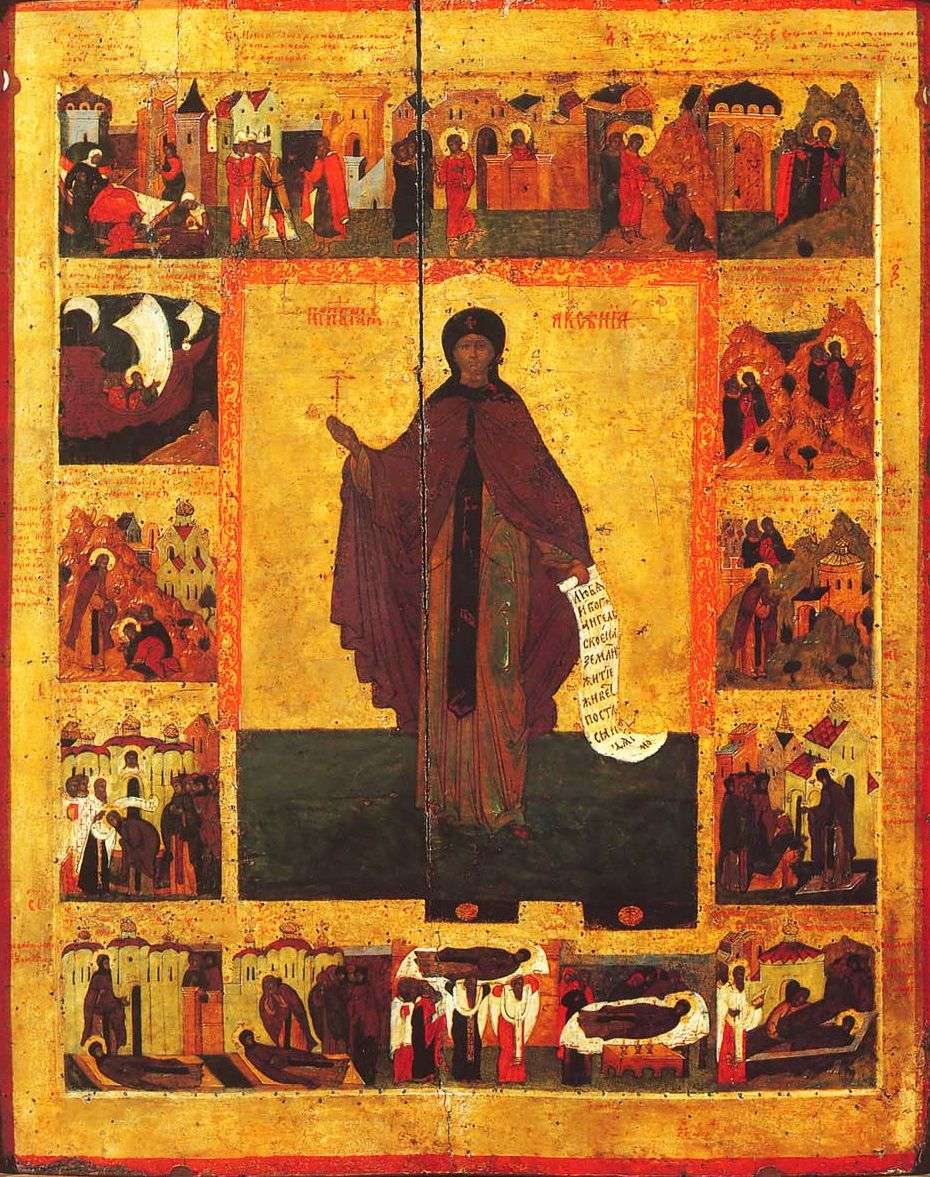
St. Xenia of Rome.

St. Xenia of Rome.
(Menologion of Basil II, 10th century).

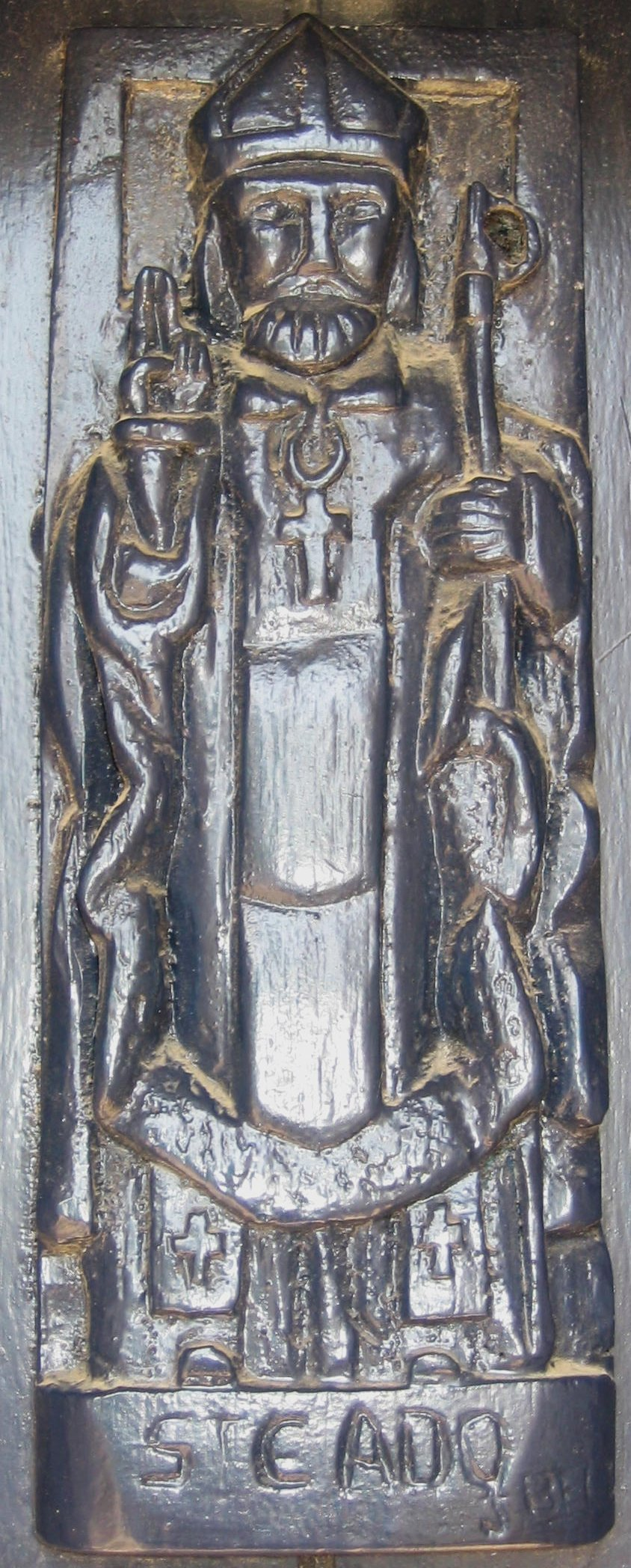
St. Cadoc.(Étel, Brittany).

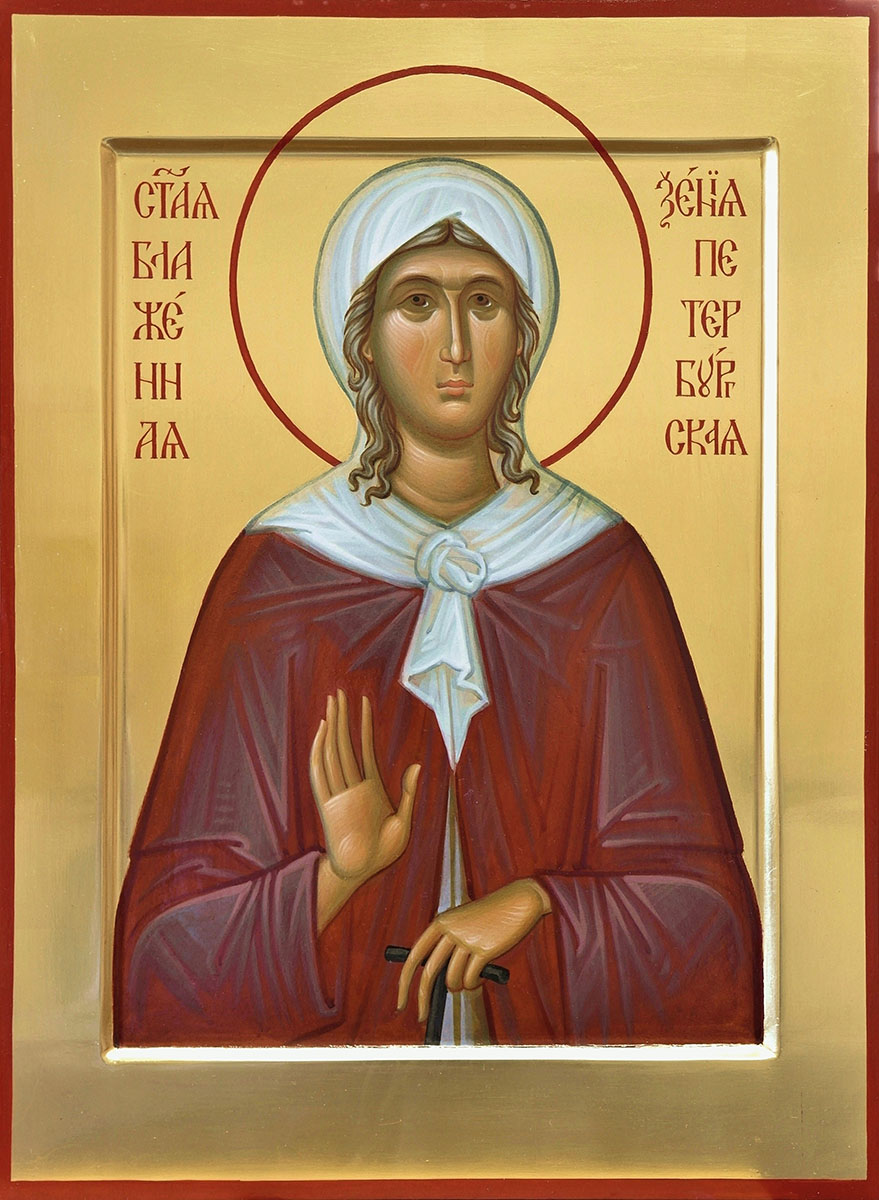
Blessed Xenia of Saint Petersburg, Fool for Christ.

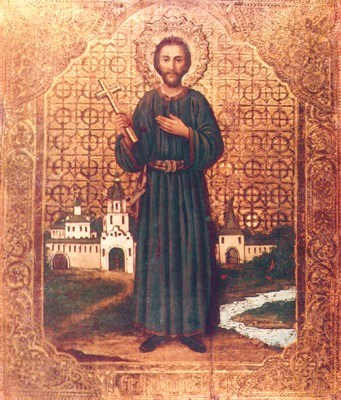
New Martyr John of Kazan.

St. Valentina Sulkovskaya of Minsk.

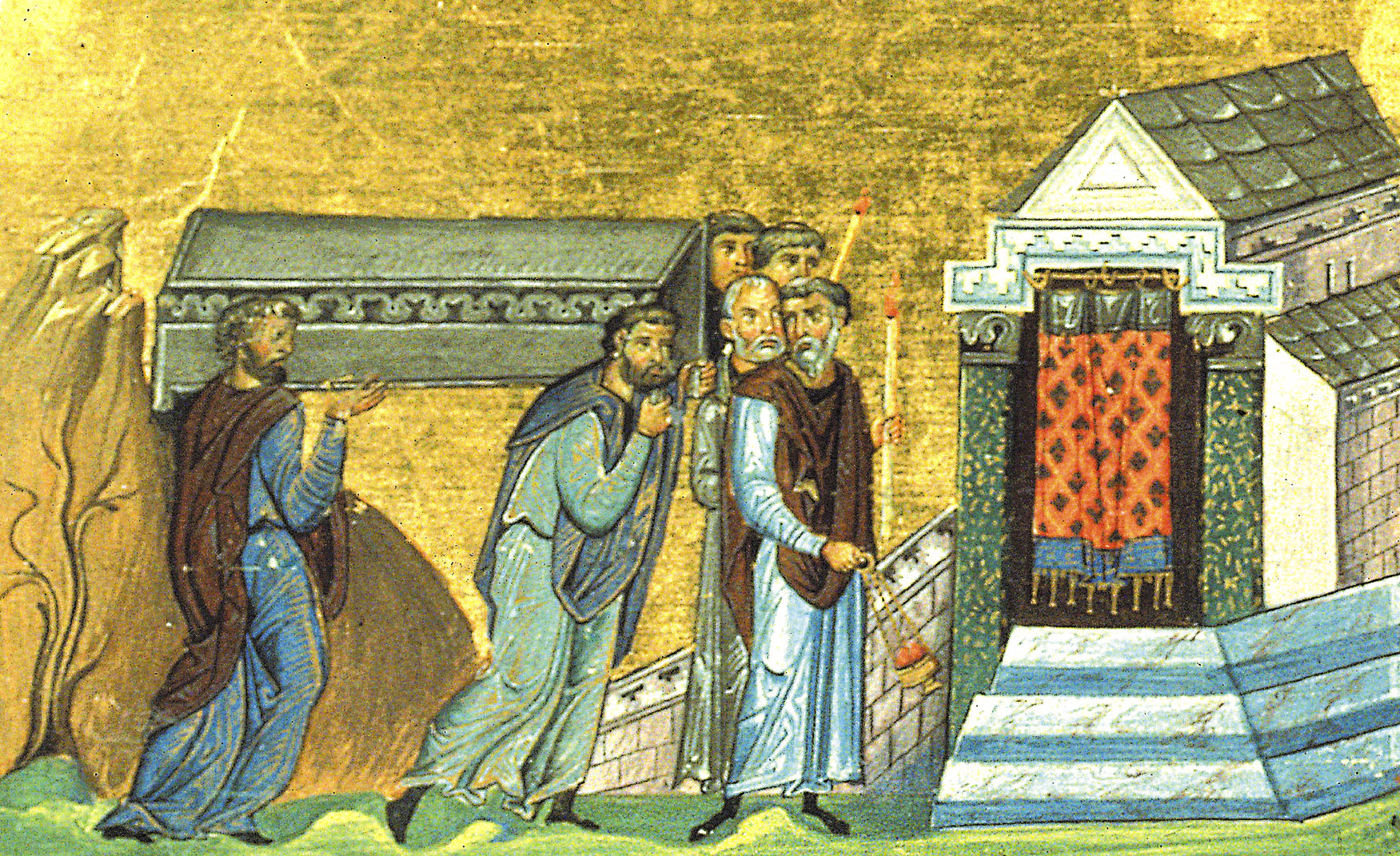
Translation of the relics of Monk-martyr Anastasius the Persian.
(Menologion of Basil II, 10th century).

== Sources ==
- January 24 / February 6. Orthodox Calendar (PRAVOSLAVIE.RU).
- February 6 / January 24. HOLY TRINITY RUSSIAN ORTHODOX CHURCH (A parish of the Patriarchate of Moscow).
- January 24. OCA - The Lives of the Saints.
- The Autonomous Orthodox Metropolia of Western Europe and the Americas (ROCOR). St. Hilarion Calendar of Saints for the year of our Lord 2004. St. Hilarion Press (Austin, TX). pp. 9–10.
- January 24. Latin Saints of the Orthodox Patriarchate of Rome.
- The Roman Martyrology. Transl. by the Archbishop of Baltimore. Last Edition, According to the Copy Printed at Rome in 1914. Revised Edition, with the Imprimatur of His Eminence Cardinal Gibbons. Baltimore: John Murphy Company, 1916. pp. 24–25.

Greek Sources

- Great Synaxaristes: (in Greek) 24 ΙΑΝΟΥΑΡΙΟΥ. ΜΕΓΑΣ ΣΥΝΑΞΑΡΙΣΤΗΣ.
- (in Greek) Συναξαριστής. 24 Ιανουαρίου. ECCLESIA.GR. (H ΕΚΚΛΗΣΙΑ ΤΗΣ ΕΛΛΑΔΟΣ).

Russian Sources

- (in Russian) 6 февраля (24 января). Православная Энциклопедия под редакцией Патриарха Московского и всея Руси Кирилла (электронная версия). (Orthodox Encyclopedia - Pravenc.ru).
- (in Russian) 24 января (ст.ст.) 6 февраля 2013 (нов. ст.). Русская Православная Церковь Отдел внешних церковных связей. (DECR).
