= Kseniya Yorsh =

Belarusian film producer (born 1990)

- Born: Oksana Kseniya Yorsh; Minsk, Belarus
- Education: New York Film Academy, UCLA Extension
- Alma mater: Belarusian State University
- Occupation: Producer
- Years active: 2013–present

Kseniya Yorsh (born February 10, 1990, in Minsk, Belarus) is a Belarusian film producer who resides in Los Angeles.

== Education ==
Yorsh obtained her degree in International Relations at the Belarusian State University in Minsk, Belarus. She later went to receive a 1-Year Conservatory certificate in Documentary Filmmaking from the New York Film Academy in Los Angeles, CA, and a Business and Management of Entertainment certificate from UCLA Extension in Los Angeles, CA.

== Films ==
Kseniya's first documentary Mask-Up talked about perception of female beauty by men and women.

She then went on to produce a live-action short film What's Next? that received nominations at a variety of festivals around the world, such as Miami Independent Film Festival, Roma Cinema DOC, Brocken Knuckle Film Festival, as well as winning InterShort Online Film Awards in September 2015.

A documentary Yorsh produced later that year, Poly, was showcased at Cannes Short Film Corner in 2016 and received distribution in Spain with Feelmakers and US with Play Festival Films.

In 2016 she did an array of films, starting with Unorthodox that was nominated for the Audience Award at the HollyShorts Film Festival and was well-reviewed afterwards.

A short film Visitors was nominated for Best Sci-Fi Short at the New York City International Film Festival, Vail Film Festival, and Newport Beach Film Festival. The film was well received in the review by Tinsel Town News Now.

Yorsh also directed and produced the short documentary Love in Porn - an insider's look into the romantic lives of those who have succeeded in the adult film industry. The film screened at the Cannes Film Festival in 2016 and received distribution in Spain with Feelmakers, in the US with Play Festival Films and in France with Gonella. The bloggers spoke highly of the sex-positive way in which the film depicts the workers of the sex industry.

In 2017 another short film she produced, Stand By Her, is going to Cannes as well.

Kseniya Yorsh's latest collaboration is with a Panamanian director Eric Iglesias for whom she is producing a feature film about one girl's choice and test of her moral values.
