= Muhammad V of Kelantan =

King of Malaysia from 2016 to 2019

Muhammad V مُحَمَّد ٥
- Al-Sultan of Kelantan
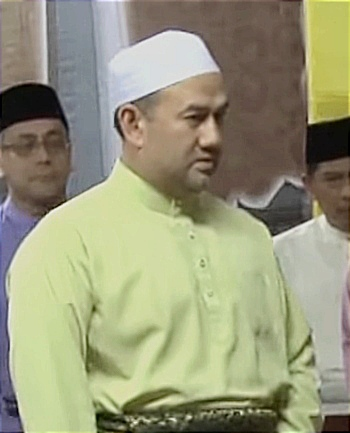

King of Malaysia
- Reign: 13 December 2016 – 6 January 2019
- Installation: 24 April 2017
- Predecessor: Abdul Halim
- Successor: Abdullah

Sultan of Kelantan
- Reign: 13 September 2010 – present
- Predecessor: Ismail Petra
- Heir presumptive: Tengku Muhammad Fa-iz Petra (2010–2024); Tengku Muhammad Fakhry Petra (2024–present)
- Born: Tengku Muhammad Faris Petra bin Tengku Ismail Petra; 6 October 1969 (age 57); Kota Bharu, Kelantan, Malaysia
- Spouse: Kangsadal Pipitpakdee (m. 2004; div. 2008); Jana Jakubková (m. 2010); Oksana Voevodina (m. 2018; div. 2019)
- Issue: Tengku Ismail Leon Petra
Names
- Tengku Muhammad Faris Petra ibni Sultan Ismail Petra
Regnal name
- Sultan Muhammad V
- House: Long Yunus
- Father: Ismail Petra of Kelantan
- Mother: Tengku Anis Binti Tengku Abdul Hamid
- Religion: Sunni Islam
- Education: SK Sultan Ismail (1); Alice Smith School; Oakham School
- Alma mater: St Cross College, Oxford; Oxford Centre for Islamic Studies

Muhammad V (Jawi: سلطان محمد ٥; born 6 October 1969) has been the 29th sultan of Kelantan since ascending to the throne in 2010. He previously reigned as King of Malaysia from 2016 until his abdication in 2019.

He was proclaimed Sultan of Kelantan on 13 September 2010, succeeding his father, Sultan Ismail Petra, who was deemed incapacitated after suffering a stroke. Sultan Muhammad V was later proclaimed Yang di-Pertuan Agong on 13 December 2016. On 6 January 2019, he became the first Yang di-Pertuan Agong to abdicate from the federal throne.

== Early life and education ==
Born Tengku Muhammad Faris Petra bin Tengku Ismail Petra (Jawi: تڠکو محمد فاريس ڤيترا بن تڠکو إسماعيل ڤيترا) in Kota Bharu, Kelantan on 6 October 1969. He is the eldest son of Sultan Ismail Petra and Raja Perempuan Tengku Anis.

Tengku Faris received his early education at Fatima Convent kindergarten from 1974 to 1975. He continued his primary education at SK Sultan Ismail (1), Kota Bharu from 1976 to 1981 and his secondary education at Alice Smith School, Kuala Lumpur before leaving for the United Kingdom to study at Oakham School, Rutland, England from 1983 to 1989. He then furthered his education at St Cross College, Oxford and at the Oxford Centre for Islamic Studies to study diplomatic studies, graduating in 1991.

He also studied at Huron University College, London, Ontario, Canada; Deutsche Stiftung für Internationale Entwicklung (DSE), Berlin, Germany; and the European Business School, London, United Kingdom.

== Crown Prince of Kelantan (1985–2010) ==
Tengku Faris was made the Tengku Mahkota (Crown Prince) of Kelantan on 6 October 1985 and formally installed at Balairong Sri, Istana Balai Besar, Kota Bharu, Kelantan on 6 October 1987.

On 14 May 2009, his father, Sultan Ismail Petra, suffered a massive stroke. He was admitted to Mount Elizabeth Hospital in Singapore and Tengku Faris was appointed the Regent of Kelantan on 25 May in the Sultan's absence.

== Sultan of Kelantan (2010–present) ==
On 13 September 2010, Tengku Muhammad Faris Petra was proclaimed the 29th Al-Sultan of Kelantan, in accordance with Article 29A of the State Constitution which states that a sultan can no longer be ruler if he is not viable to rule for a period of more than a year. He took the regnal name Sultan Muhammad V.

Sultan Muhammad V attended the 222nd Meeting of the Conference of Rulers for the first time as a full member in October 2010. This marked the recognition of his accession as sultan by other rulers.

Sultan Muhammad V is the Colonel in Chief of Royal Intelligence Corps (Malaysia) and Royal Artillery Regiment (Malaysia).

Since 23 November 2022, he has served as the Chancellor of Universiti Malaysia Kelantan (UMK), as per his duties as Sultan of Kelantan.

== Deputy Yang di-Pertuan Agong (2011–2016) ==
Sultan Muhammad V was elected Deputy Yang di-Pertuan Agong in October 2011. He served in the post from 13 December 2011 until his election as Yang di-Pertuan Agong on 13 December 2016.

== Yang di-Pertuan Agong (2016–2019) ==
Sultan Muhammad V was elected by the Conference of Rulers on 14 October 2016 to become the next Yang di-Pertuan Agong, the head of state of Malaysia. His reign began on 13 December 2016, taking over from Abdul Halim, the Sultan of Kedah. Sultan Muhammad V was installed as the fifteenth Yang Di Pertuan Agong of Malaysia on 24 April 2017 in a ceremony held at the Istana Negara, Jalan Duta, Kuala Lumpur.

His younger brother, Tengku Muhammad Faiz Petra, the Tengku Mahkota, served as Regent of Kelantan throughout Sultan Muhammad V's tenure as Yang di-Pertuan Agong.

He was made an Honorary Fellow of his former College, St Cross College, Oxford on 28 February 2018.

It was during his reign when Malaysia witnessed the first change in government in 2018, when the ruling Barisan Nasional coalition government, led by former Prime Minister Najib Razak, was unseated by the Pakatan Harapan government, led by former Prime Minister Mahathir Mohamad. Sultan Muhammad V also granted a royal pardon to Anwar Ibrahim, the current Prime Minister of Malaysia, which paved the way for him to return to the Dewan Rakyat once again in a by-election held later that year.

In an unprecedented move, Sultan Muhammad V became the first Yang di-Pertuan Agong to abdicate from the throne, effective 6 January 2019 while his term was to end on 12 December 2021. This followed a leave of absence from his position following rumours that he had married a former Russian beauty queen.

== Personal life ==
Though Sultan Muhammad V was married at the time, he was the first Yang di-Pertuan Agong in Malaysian history to reign without a Raja Permaisuri Agong or official consort.

=== First marriage ===
On 15 November 2004, Sultan Muhammad V (then the Tengku Mahkota) married Kangsadal Pipitpakdee, a member of the Patani royal family. Upon marriage she took the name Tengku Zubaidah binti Tengku Norudin. They divorced in 2008 without issue.

=== Second marriage ===
On 30 October 2010, Sultan Muhammad V married a Czech, Jana Jakubková, in a private ceremony. Prior to her marriage she converted to Islam and changed her name to Nur Diana Petra Abdullah. She was proclaimed as the Sultanah of Kelantan on 2 August 2022 with the style and title Her Royal Highness Sultanah Nur Diana Petra Abdullah, Sultanah of Kelantan.

=== Third marriage ===
In November 2018, it was reported that while on leave from the country, Sultan Muhammad V had married former beauty pageant winner, Oksana Voevodina in Barvikha, Russia. However, there was no official record of a marriage in Russia and the reported wedding there was only a party to enable her friends and family to celebrate the couple's official Islamic wedding, which had taken place in private on 7 June 2018, in Kota Bharu, Kelantan. Prior to the wedding, Oksana converted to Islam and changed her name to Rihana Oxana Petra. Oksana gave birth to their son, Tengku Ismail Leon Petra, on 21 May 2019. On 22 June, Sultan Muhammad V filled for divorce in Singapore and on 1 July, he divorced her by using talak tiga or triple talaq, the most severe divorce in Islam. On 6 September, over three months after the birth of their son, the sultan publicly acknowledged that the marriage did take place.

=== Alleged fourth marriage ===
In October 2025, it was reported that the Sultan had married for the fourth time to an American, Brittany Porter. According to her, they met in New York City in January 2024. The Sultan proposed in April 2024 with a blue diamond ring and they had an Akad Nikah ceremony in Oman the same month. Porter claimed she did not realize that it was a legally binding marriage and instead thought it was an engagement ceremony. She suffered a miscarriage in July 2024 and he later cut off all contact.

== Awards and recognitions ==
Styles of Muhammad V
- Reference style: His Royal Highness
- Spoken style: Your Royal Highness
- Alternative style: Tuanku

=== Honours ===
==== Kelantan ====
- Grand Master (since 13 September 2010) and Recipient (DK) (6 October 1986) of the Royal Family Order of Kelantan or Star of Yunus
- Grand Master and Knight Grand Commander of the Order of the Crown of Kelantan or Star of Muhammad (SPMK) (since 13 September 2010) – Dato'
- Grand Master and Knight Grand Commander of the Order of the Life of the Crown of Kelantan or Star of Ismail (SJMK) (since 13 September 2010) – Dato'
- Grand Master and Knight Grand Commander of the Order of the Noble Crown of Kelantan or Star of Yahya (SPKK) (since 13 September 2010) – Dato'
- Grand Master and Knight Grand Commander of the Order of the Loyalty to the Crown of Kelantan or Star of Ibrahim (SPSK) (since 13 September 2010) – Dato'
- Founding Grand Master and Knight Grand Commander of the Most Loyal Order of Services to the Crown of Kelantan or Star of Petra (SPJK) (since 15 May 2016) – Dato'
- Grand Master of the Order of the Most Distinguished and Most Valiant Warrior (PYGP) (since 13 September 2010)
- Sultan Ismail Petra Coronation Medal (30 March 1980)
- Sultan Ismail Petra Silver Jubilee Medal (30 March 2004)
- Sultan Muhammad V Proclamation Medal (13 September 2010)

==== Malaysia and its other states ====
- Malaysia
  - Grand Master of the Order of the Royal Family of Malaysia (13 December 2016 – 6 January 2019) and Recipient (DKM) (31 January 2017)
  - Recipient (DMN) (7 December 2011) and Grand Master of the Order of the Crown of the Realm (13 December 2016 – 6 January 2019)
  - Grand Master of the Order of the Defender of the Realm (13 December 2016 – 6 January 2019)
  - Grand Master of the Order of Loyalty to the Crown of Malaysia (13 December 2016 – 6 January 2019)
  - Grand Master of the Order of Merit of Malaysia (13 December 2016 – 6 January 2019)
  - Grand Master of the Order of Meritorious Service (13 December 2016 – 6 January 2019)
  - Grand Master of the Order of Loyalty to the Royal Family of Malaysia (13 December 2016 – 6 January 2019)
  - Recipient of the 9th Yang di-Pertuan Agong Installation Medal (18 September 1989)
  - Recipient of the 10th Yang di-Pertuan Agong Installation Medal (22 September 1994)
  - Recipient of the 11th Yang di-Pertuan Agong Installation Medal (23 September 1999)
  - Recipient of the 12th Yang di-Pertuan Agong Installation Medal (25 April 2002)
  - Recipient of the 13th Yang di-Pertuan Agong Installation Medal (26 April 2007)
  - Recipient of the 14th Yang di-Pertuan Agong Installation Medal (11 April 2012)
  - Recipient of the 15th Yang di-Pertuan Agong Installation Medal (24 April 2017)
- Johor
  - First Class of the Royal Family Order of Johor (DK I) (14 April 2011)
- Kedah
  - Member of the Royal Family Order of Kedah (DK) (26 March 2012)
- Negeri Sembilan
  - Member of the Royal Family Order of Negeri Sembilan (DKNS) (7 April 2011)
  - Recipient of the Tuanku Muhriz Installation Medal (26 October 2009)
- Pahang
  - Member 1st class of the Family Order of the Crown of Indra of Pahang (DK I) (20 December 2023)
- Perak
  - Recipient of the Royal Family Order of Perak (DK) (24 July 2011)
- Perlis
  - Recipient of the Perlis Family Order of the Gallant Prince Syed Putra Jamalullail (DK) (19 October 2011)
  - Recipient of the Tuanku Syed Sirajuddin Jamalullail Installation Medal (7 May 2001)
- Selangor
  - First Class of the Royal Family Order of Selangor (DK I) (2010)
  - Recipient of the Sultan Sharafuddin Coronation Medal (8 March 2003)
- Terengganu
  - Member first class of the Family Order of Terengganu (DK I) (November 2014)
  - Recipient of the Sultan Mizan Zainal Abidin Coronation Medal (4 March 1999)

==== Foreign ====
- Bahrain: Member Special Class of the Order of Sheikh Isa bin Salman Al Khalifa (1 May 2017)
- Brunei: Sultan of Brunei Golden Jubilee Medal (5 October 2017)
- France: Grand Cross of the Order of the Legion of Honour (27 March 2017)
- Qatar: Collar of the Order of Independence (15 October 2017)
- Saudi Arabia: Collar of Badr Chain (26 February 2017)

==== Academic ====
- Honorary Fellow, St Cross College, University of Oxford (28 February 2018)

=== Places named after him ===
- Sultan Muhammad V Mosque in Kampung Lajau, Labuan
- Sultan Muhammad V Mosque in Kompleks Penjara Sungai Udang, Melaka
- Wisma Sultan Muhammad V in Cairo, Egypt
- Sultan Muhammad V Highway in Kota Bharu, Kelantan
- Tengku Muhammad Faris Petra Mosque in Kuala Krai, Kelantan
- Tengku Muhammad Faris Petra Science Secondary School in Pengkalan Chepa, Kelantan

Muhammad V of Kelantan Kelantan Royal Family Born: 1969
Regnal titles
Preceded by Ismail Petra	Sultan of Kelantan; 2010–present	Incumbent; Heir presumptive: Tengku Muhammad Fakhry Petra
Preceded by Abdul Halim of Kedah	Yang di-Pertuan Agong; 2016–2019	Succeeded by Abdullah of Pahang
