= Oksana Voevodina =

Russian model (born 1992)

Oxana Voevodina
- Born: Oxana Andreevna Voevodina; 10 July 1992 (age 34); Taganrog, Russia
- Other names: Rihana Oxana Petra; Rihana Oxana Gorbatenko; Nikol (screen name)
- Education: Plekhanov Russian University of Economics
- Occupation: Model
- Height: 179 cm (5 ft 10 in)
- Spouse: Sultan Muhammad V (m. 2018; div. 2019)
- Children: Tengku Ismail Leon Petra ibni Sultan Muhammad V
- Beauty pageant titleholder
- Title: Miss Moscow 2015
- Hair color: Brown
- Eye color: Brown
- Major competition: Miss Moscow 2015 (Winner)
- Website: Oksana Voevodina on Instagram

Oxana Andreevna Voevodina (Russian: Оксана Андре́евна Воеводина, romanized: Oxana Andreevna Voevodina; born 10 July 1992 in Taganrog), also known as Rihana Petra, is a Russian model who is the former wife of Sultan Muhammad V of Kelantan. They married during his reign as the 15th Yang di-Pertuan Agong (King of Malaysia) and divorced soon after his abdication as King. She is also a beauty pageant winner and was crowned Miss Moscow 2015.

== Biography ==
Voevodina Oxana was raised and educated in Taganrog, a city in the Rostov Oblast, Russia. Her father, Andrei Ivanovich Gorbatenko, is an orthopedic surgeon from Rostov-on-Don, with clinics in Rostov-on-Don and Taganrog. Her mother Lyudmila Voevodina, a concert pianist, who worked at the Bolshoi. Oxana had learned English by attending an Oxford summer school. She later pursued an undergraduate degree in economics at Plekhanov Russian University of Economics (PRUE) in Moscow and eventually obtained a master's degree in management. As a beauty pageant contestant, Voevodina won the Miss Moscow title in 2015.

== Personal life ==
On 22 November 2018, Voevodina secretly married Sultan Muhammad V of Kelantan and the 15th Yang di-Pertuan Agong or King of Malaysia as his second wife, in Moscow, Russia without the knowledge of her husband's first wife. Her husband's first wife was Sultanah Nur Diana Petra. They also already had a traditional Malay wedding in Malaysia on 7 June 2018 prior to the Russian wedding celebration. She had converted to Islam that same year, in April 2018 and changed her name to Rihana Oxana Petra adopting the family name of Muhammad V. While the purported wedding was widely covered and discussed on social media, as of January 2019 no official statement has been released to confirm or deny that matter. With effect on 6 January 2019, Sultan Muhammad abdicated as Yang di-Pertuan Agong of Malaysia, almost three years before his term of office was due to end; commentators suggested this was prompted by opposition to his marriage to Voevodina.

The media reported the birth of their son Tengku Ismail Leon Petra bin Tengku Muhammad V Faris Petra on 21 May 2019 in Moscow. On 22 June 2019, a month after the birth of their mutual son, Muhammad V divorced Voevodina in Singapore by a "talak tiga" (third talaq) or talaq baayin, the irrevocable divorce executed by simply announcing to his wife that he dissolves the marriage, which is considered to be the most offensive and disapproved type of divorce in Islam.

During the TV interview with Russian presenter and top female opposition politician Ksenia Sobchak, Voevodina revealed that the Czech wife of Muhammad V, Diana Petra or Jana Jakubková (Diana's birth name) reached out to her and her father insulting and threatening her son in June 2019. This incident was widely discussed in the British and Russian media.

After Voevodina had posted photos of their life together on her Instagram account, the Kelantan palace finally issued an official statement on 6 September 2019 rebuking the matter as untrue by condemning postings of the monarch's private life on social media as inappropriate and defamatory. The sultan somehow expressed 'regret' regarding his personal choices of his private life that has caused people's confusion, albeit without mentioning any names; apparently he acknowledged the marriage did occur.

== See also ==
- Oxana - name

Awards and achievements
Preceded by Irina Alekseeva	Miss Moscow; 2015	Succeeded by Tatyana Zimfer
