= Serhiy Melnyk =

Serhiy Melnyk (Ukrainian: Сергій Мельник, Russian: Сергей Мельник, Belarusian: Сяргей Мельнік; other transliterations: Sergei, Sergey, Syarhey; Melnik or Melnick) may refer to the following people:

- Serhiy Melnyk (footballer born 1988), Ukrainian football defender
- Serhiy Melnyk (footballer born 1993), Ukrainian football striker
- Serhiy Melnyk (politician) (born 1965), Ukrainian politician
- Syarhey Melnik (born 1995), Belarusian football midfielder
