= Ksenia Anske =

American author

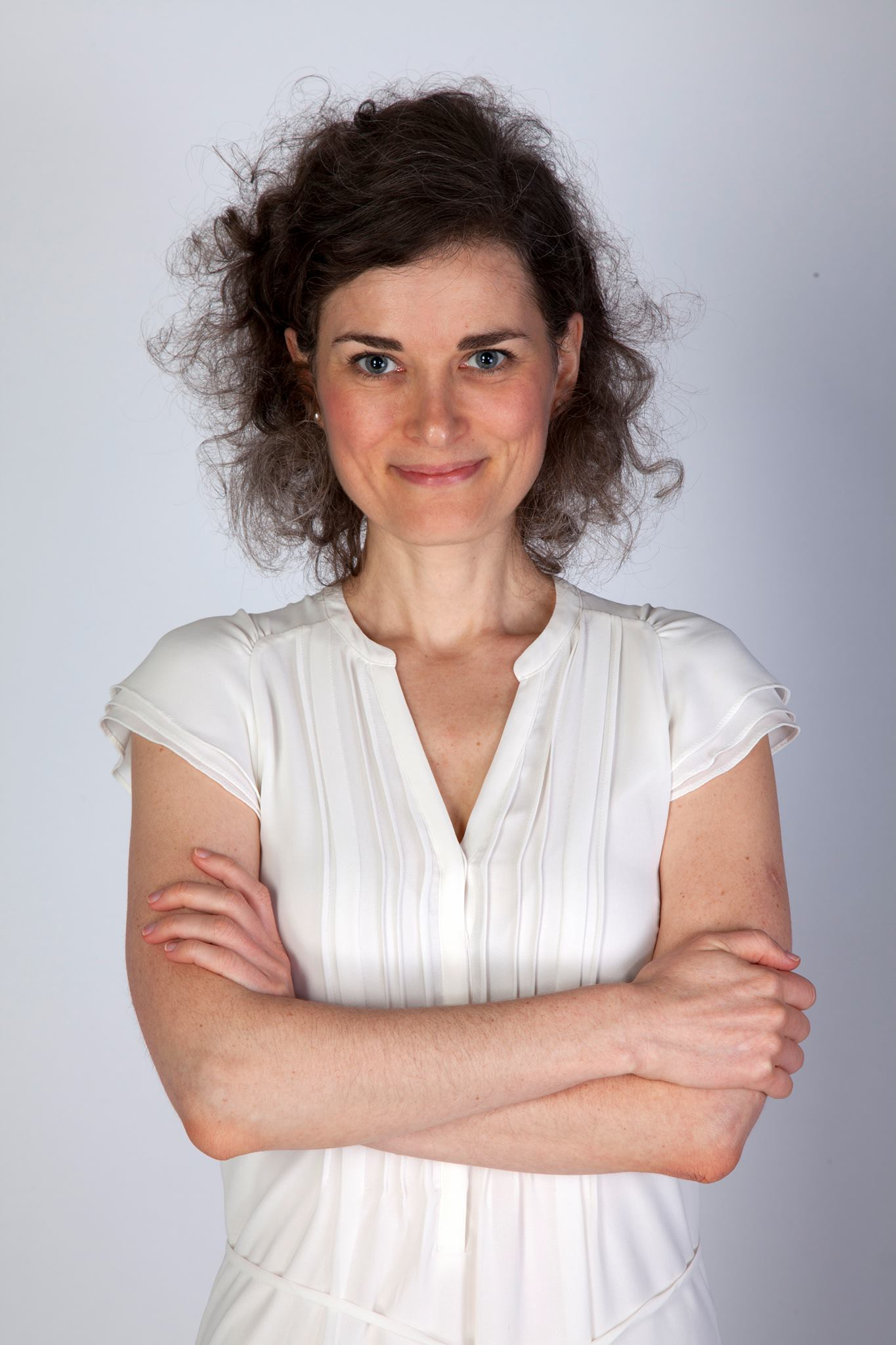
- Ksenia Anske, 2015
- Born: Ksenia Kubeeva; 6 February 1976 (age 50); Moscow, Russia
- Citizenship: United States, Russia
- Education: Bachelor of Fine Arts in design
- Occupation: Author
- Spouse: Yuri Milioutin (m. 1994; div. 1998) Maxim Oustiougov (m. 1998; div. 2011)
- Partner: Royce Daniel (2010–present)
- Children: Anya Milioutina; Peter Ustyugov
- Writing career
- Years active: 2012–present
- Genres: fantasy, dark fantasy, horror

Ksenia Anske (born Ksenia Kubeeva; February 6, 1976) is an American fantasy short fiction writer and novelist. She published seven novels and two books from her tweets about writing.

== Personal life ==
Ksenia was born in 1976 in Moscow, Russia. Her parents divorced when she was four years old. Her father took her to Berlin to live with his family when she was 11, where she lived for four years. When she was 15, she began writing diaries, then changed to poetry and flash fiction. She ran away from home when she was 17.

In early 1994, she married Yuri Milioutin, and later that year they had a daughter, Anya Milioutina. They divorced in 1998.

In 1998, she married Maxim Oustiougov. In November 1998, the family moved to Seattle, Washington, United States without knowing English. In 2003, they had a son, Peter Ustyugov. They separated, and later divorced in 2011.

She began dating Royce Daniel in November 2010.

== Education and career ==
She studied architecture at the Moscow Architectural Institute from 1996 to 1998. In 2002, she graduated with a Bachelor of Fine Arts in design from Cornish College of the Arts.

She founded Lilipip in 2007, an online animated marketing videos for businesses. In 2009, she was named one of the Top 100 Women in Seattle Tech by Puget Sound Business Journal, named Geek of the Week, and won the UW Business Plan Competition in the "best idea" category for her startup, Lilipip. She was also a social media consultant. In 2012, she left her career to be a full-time writer.

Anske self-publishes her books, even giving away her e-books for free on her website, including all drafts of the novels.

"Anske" is an anagram of Ksenia, excluding the "i".

In September, 2014, Amtrak announced that she was one of two local winners of the first Amtrak Writers Residency.

=== Literary influences ===
Her earliest influences were Tove Jannson, Astrid Lindgren and many Russian fairy tales.

Authors who later influenced her work include Anton Chekhov, Vladimir Nabokov, Mikhaíl Bulgakov, Alexander Pushkin and Daniil Kharms. Her influences after learning English include Stephen King, J.K. Rowling, Chuck Palahniuk, Cormac McCarthy, Haruki Murakami, Neil Gaiman and Virginia Woolf.

== Social outreach ==
Anske posts bi-weekly on her own blog, sharing posts from personal essays to professional writing tips. Through her books and blog, she advocates bringing awareness of suicide and sexual abuse.

== Bibliography ==
=== Siren Suicides trilogy ===
1. I Chose to Die (2013)
2. My Sisters in Death (2013)
3. The Afterlife (2013)

=== Novels ===
- Rosehead (2014)
- Irkadura (2014)
- The Badlings (2015)
- Siren Suicides: Second Edition (2016)
- TUBE: Trans-Urban Blitz-Express (2018)
- The Dacha Murders (forthcoming)

=== Short stories ===
- "Rain of Elephants Reported" (Our Brothers Grimmest by The Grimm Report, 2013)
- "Ilka" (Paper and Ink Literary Zine, issue 6, 2015)
- A Collection of Short Stories (forthcoming)

=== Non-fiction ===
- Blue Sparrow: tweets on writing, reading, and other creative nonsense (2013)
- Blue Sparrow 2: tweets on writing, reading, and other creative nonsense (2015)
