= Ksenija Pavlovic =

Yugoslav-born American journalist

- Born: Belgrade
- Education: London School of Economics; Yale University; University of Belgrade
- Occupations: Journalist and Political Scientist
- Known for: Founder of The Pavlovic Today, Advocate for Press Freedom
- Spouse: US Army Gen. Timothy J. Mcateer

Ksenija Pavlovic is an American journalist, political scientist, educator, political and cultural critic, a published poet and author of the novel Pisma Vetru.

== Early life ==
Pavlovic was born in former Yugoslavia. After graduating in Journalism and Political Science from the University of Belgrade Faculty of Political Sciences and obtaining an M.A. in American politics, she moved to London to study at the London School of Economics (LSE) earning an MSc in European Ideas and Identities.

== Career ==
Pavlovic is the White House Correspondent and State Department Correspondent. She broke many stories on the US-Western Balkans related topics most notably Serbia-Kosovo normalization agreement on the path to normalisation between Kosovo and Serbia.

Pavlovic has been featured in The Washington Post, Huffington Post, The Hill, CBC, Grazia, The Independent, The Yale Globalist, Lisa Wexler Show, and other media.

In 2018, Pavlovic has been awarded a Poynter Fellowship in Journalism for her talk at Yale University: The State of Free Press in Trump’s America. ( Poynter Fellowship: Ksenija Pavlovic)

In 2019, in a federal lawsuit Karem v Trump, Ksenija Pavlovic, Jonathan Karl, Sam Donaldson, Todd J. Gillman, filed affidavits in support of the legal case led by Ted Boutrous to reinstate Brian Karem’s White House press pass.

Prior to founding the independent American news company The Pavlovic Today, Pavlovic has contributed to publications including The Spectator and Yale Herald and media on the Balkans including The Original, magazine founded by the Novak Djokovic Foundation. She serves on the foundation's editorial board as Managing Editor and is an advocate for early childhood education.

Pavlovic has interviewed figures including Arianna Huffington, actress Marion Cotillard, filmmaker Abel Ferrara, Anna Wintour, Sir Richard Branson, President of the World Bank Jim Yong Kim, Karlie Kloss, filmmaker and founder of the Webby awards Tiffany Shlain, film director Lars von Trier, actors Adam Brody, Monica Bellucci, Claudia Cardinale, fashion designers Adolfo Dominguez, Tommy Hilfiger and Donna Karan, publisher and former presidential candidate Steve Forbes; the tennis player Novak Djokovic; novelist Martin Amis, and Milorad Dodik, President of the Serbian entity of BIH.

Pavlovic has covered events such as the Cannes Film Festival, Venice Film Festival, Sarajevo Film Festival, Madrid Fashion Week, The Madrid Open as well as The Clinton Global Initiative.

She has served as a Teaching Fellow on both undergraduate and graduate levels at Yale University, as well as a Doctoral Fellow in the Political Science department at Yale University, Lead Instructor in International Affairs and Security and Politics, Law and Economics programs at Yale Young Global Scholars, Head Writing Fellow at the Yale Graduate Writing Center.
