= Vijaya Melnick =

India-born American academic

- Born: Vijaya Lakshmi; 19 November 1937 (age 88); Calicut, Kerala, India
- Title: Professor Emeritus
- Children: 1

Academic background
- Education: M.S., PhD, cell biology, University of Wisconsin Medical School

Academic work
- Discipline: biological and environmental sciences and immunology
- Institutions: University of the District of Columbia

Vijaya Lakshmi Melnick (born 19 November 1937) is an India-born American academic specializing in biological and environmental sciences and immunology. She is Professor Emeritus of Biological and Environmental Sciences at the University of the District of Columbia. She was the First Vice President and then Co-President of the International Health Awareness Network, an affiliate of the United Nations. She holds memberships on the boards and executive committees of national and international organizations related to either health and education or both. She has written several research papers and books.

== Early life and education ==
Melnick was born Vijaya Lakshmi in Calicut, Kerala, India. She attended a girls' school run by Franciscan nuns, where she received an English medium school education. She then attended a girls' college and an Agricultural College. In her senior year at the Agricultural College, she won an International Peace Scholarship to study in the United States and enrolled at the University of Wisconsin. She obtained her Master's and doctoral degrees from the University of Wisconsin and continued there for her postdoctoral training in cell biology.

== Career ==
Melnick has worked in teaching and research, including at the University of the District of Columbia in the Georgetown University Medical Center, International Center for Interdisciplinary Studies in Immunology, Howard University Medical College, Lemelson Center for Inventions & Innovations, the National Museum of American History, the Smithsonian Institution, and the Einstein Institute for Science, Health and the Courts.

At the University of the District of Columbia, Melnick holds the rank of Professor Emeritus of Biological and Environmental Sciences. Here, she also held the post of the Director of the Office of Sponsored Research & Programs. At the Georgetown University Medical Center, she has held the post of Associate Director at the International Center for Interdisciplinary Studies in Immunology. She is a member of the Health Care Ethics Faculty at the Howard University Medical College. Melnick is also a Principal Investigator on several research projects.

== Other activities ==
Melnick was the First Vice President and later Co-President of the International Health Awareness Network, an affiliate of the United Nations. She was a senior science adviser and faculty member of the Einstein Institute for Science Health and the Courts. She holds memberships on the boards and executive committees of national and international organizations related to health and education.

== Speeches ==
Speaking at the 2014 Conference on the Culture of Peace, Melnick addressed the problem of violence against women by citing several reasons for the phenomenon, including poverty, living under a patriarchal system, economic inequality, and under-representation in the political venue. She said: "The assault on women begins even before they are born and continues to adolescence and into adulthood and old age. Globally, it continues to be our greatest shame and tragedy". Commenting on the demographic status of women versus men she mentioned that "We know from demographic reports, that over 4 to 5 million women go missing every year from the world! This is attributed to sex-selective abortion occurring in countries like China, India, Armenia, Vietnam and many others".

== Publications ==
=== Books ===
- Alzheimer's Dementia: Dilemmas in Clinical Research Contemporary Issues in Biomedicine, Ethics, and Society
- Minorities in Science: The Challenge for Change in Biomedicine
- Physiological studies on fruit development using in vivo organ transplantation (1964);
- Boarder Babies and Drug Affected Children in the District of Columbia: A Case for Public/private Partnerships Comprehensive Planning and Coordinated Services (1992)

=== Papers ===
- (Jointly with Daniel Melnick) "Innovation and Development: India as an Example".

== Personal ==
She and her husband have one son.
