= Macedonius of Syria =

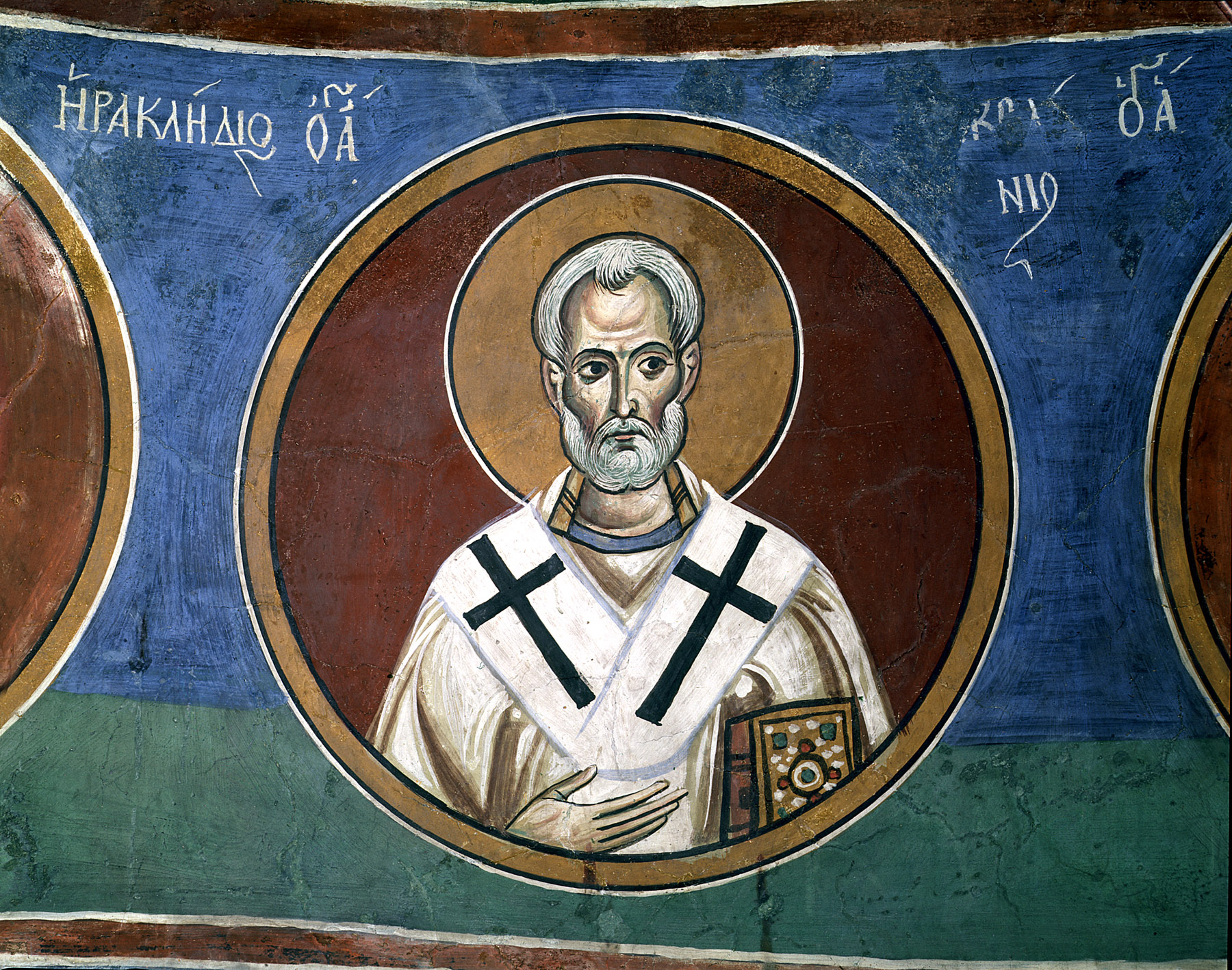

Macedonius the Hermit, sometimes known as Macedonius Kritophagus, lived at the turn of the fourth to fifth century in Byzantine Syria. He is venerated as a saint in the Eastern Orthodox Church, with a feast day of January 24.

Macedonius began his ascetic life as a pilgrim wandering from city to city in Syria, Phoenicia, and Cilicia, living entirely on barley moistened with water (hence Kritophagus, "barley-eater"). Eventually he settled in the wilderness, far from human contact, taking shelter in a pit. He considered food a form of medicine that could be taken to stave off death because it is not lawful to "shorten one's life to shun labors and conflicts".

Macedonius became well known to people far and wide for his holiness and gifts of healing and exorcism. Gradually, multitudes of people came to seek his direction and intercession. Only at a very advanced age did he agree to live in a cell provided for him. He died circa 420 at seventy years of age.

== See also ==
- Christian monasticism
- Stylites
- Poustinia
