= Xenija Melnik =

German politician (born 2001)

Member of the Hamburg Parliament
- Incumbent
- Assumed office 26 March 2025

Personal details
- Born: 2001 (age 24–25)
- Party: Die Linke

Xenija Melnik (born 2001) is a German politician from Die Linke. She has been a member of the Hamburg Parliament since 26 March 2025.

== Biography ==
Melnik grew up in Hamburg. Her parents are ethnic German repatriates from Ukraine. Melnik graduated from the Lessing-Stadtteilschule and studied at the North German Academy for Tax Law and Finance in 2020. She worked for the Hamburg tax administration and later in the private sector. Since 2024, Melnik has worked as a tax assistant at the law firm Hansa Partner Rommel & Meyer. She lives in Harburg.

== Political career ==
Melnik joined the Left Party in 2019. She is a board member of the Left Party's Harburg district association.

In 2024, Melnik was elected to the Harburg district assembly. In the 2025 Hamburg state election, she was placed 17th on the state list and also ran as a direct candidate in the Harburg constituency, where she won the third seat with 10,674 votes. Melnik was elected deputy chair of her parliamentary group. She is the youngest member of the Hamburg Parliament in its 23rd legislative term.
