= North German Academy for Finance and Tax Law Hamburg =

Coordinates: 53.5617°N 10.0564°E

The North German Academy for Finance and Tax Law Hamburg (NoA) is a public institution established in 2010 through the merger of the former University of Finance Hamburg and the State Finance School Hamburg. It operates under the jurisdiction of the Hamburg Ministry of Finance and is responsible for the education and training of tax officials for the financial administrations of Hamburg, Bremen, and Mecklenburg-Western Pomerania. The academy offers programs leading to qualifications such as Diplom-Finanzwirt and Finanzwirt, encompassing subjects like income tax law, sales tax law, bookkeeping, private law, economics, white-collar crime, and social sciences.

== History ==
The North German Academy for Finance and Tax Law Hamburg (NoA) was established on September 1, 2010, through the consolidation of the former University of Finance Hamburg, the State Finance School Hamburg, and the training division of the Hamburg Ministry of Finance.

On June 6, 2012, the Free and Hanseatic City of Hamburg, the Free Hanseatic City of Bremen, and the State of Mecklenburg-Western Pomerania entered into an agreement to collaborate on the training of tax officials. As a result, since September 1, 2012, the NoA has been responsible for the education of candidates for the second entry-level position (formerly the intermediate service), and since October 1, 2012, for the first entry-level position (formerly the higher service) across these three states. The training for Bremen candidates is conducted at the Bremen branch, while Mecklenburg-Western Pomerania candidates are trained at the Güstrow branch.

== Study ==
The North German Academy for Finance and Tax Law Hamburg (NoA) offers specialized training programs for careers in the tax administrations of Hamburg, Bremen, and Mecklenburg-Western Pomerania. The primary programs include the Diplom-Finanzwirt (FH) and Finanzwirt qualifications.

- Diplom-Finanzwirt (FH) Program

This three-year dual study program combines theoretical education with practical training. It comprises 21 months of academic coursework at the NoA and 15 months of practical experience in various financial offices. The theoretical component is divided into Grundstudium I, II, III, and Hauptstudium phases, each followed by corresponding practical training periods. Subjects covered include income tax law, value-added tax law, accounting, private law, economics, white-collar crime, and social sciences. The program concludes with a career examination, awarding the degree of Diplom-Finanzwirt (FH).

- Finanzwirt Training Program

In addition to the higher service program, the NoA provides training for the intermediate service positions in tax administration. This dual training program also spans three years, integrating academic studies with practical training. The curriculum focuses on preparing candidates for roles such as Finanzwirt, emphasizing practical skills and foundational knowledge necessary for tax administration duties.

The academy's main campus is located in Hamburg-Hamm, with additional branches in Bremen and Güstrow serving candidates from the respective states.

== Locations ==
The North German Academy for Finance and Tax Law Hamburg (NoA) operates at three main locations: Hamburg, Bremen, and Güstrow. The central campus is located in the Hamburg district of Hamm, at Hammer Steindamm 129. This site houses the majority of the administrative offices and teaching facilities. In addition to the Hamburg campus, the academy maintains a branch in Bremen, situated in the Haus des Reichs, and another in Güstrow, Mecklenburg-Western Pomerania. These locations are used for the training of tax administration personnel from their respective federal states. Plans for a new campus in the Hamburg district of Horn, at Beim Pachthof, were approved in 2022 to address future space and infrastructure needs.
