= Roderick Melnik =

Canadian-Australian mathematician

- Citizenship: Australia
- Education: Kiev State University
- Awards: NSERC Tier I Canada Research Chair
- Scientific career
- Fields: Applied Mathematics, Nanoscale Systems, Mathematical Modelling in Science and Engineering

Roderick Melnik is a Canadian-Australian mathematician and scientist, internationally known for his research in applied mathematics, numerical analysis, and mathematical modeling for scientific and engineering applications.

== Biography ==
Melnik is a Tier I Canada Research Chair in Mathematical Modeling and Professor at Wilfrid Laurier University in Waterloo, Canada. His other affiliations include the University of Waterloo and University of Guelph.

== Education and career ==
He earned his Ph.D. at Kiev State University in the late 1980s. According to the Mathematics Genealogy Project, his scientific ancestors include A. Tikhonov and other outstanding mathematicians and scientists.

Before moving to Canada as a Tier I Canada Research Chair, Melnik gained a worldwide reputation in mathematical modelling and applied mathematics, while working in Europe, Australia, and the United States.

== Awards and honors ==
Melnik is a recipient of many fellowships and awards, including the Andersen fellowship at Syddansk Universitet in Denmark, the Isaac Newton Institute visiting fellowship at the University of Cambridge in England, the Ikerbasque Fellowship in Spain, the fellowship of the Institute of Advanced Studies at the University of Bologna in Italy, and others. He is a life member of the Canadian Applied and Industrial Mathematics Society. Melnik is the director of the Laboratory of Mathematical Modeling for New Technologies (M^{2}NeT Lab) in Waterloo, Ontario, Canada.

== Research ==
In his early works Melnik studied fully coupled hyperbolic-elliptic models applied in dynamic piezoelectricity theory. Such models, originally proposed by W. Voigt in 1910, have found many applications, and Melnik was the first to rigorously prove well-posedness of a large class of such models in the dynamic case. The piezoelectric effect itself, captured by such models, was discovered in 1880 by Pierre and Jacques Curie. Mathematical models describing this effect in time-dependent situations are based on initial-boundary value problems for coupled systems of partial differential equations. The mathematical and computational analysis of such coupled systems has been in the focus of many Melnik's works. In the 1990s he extended his scientific interests to applications of mathematics in semiconductor and other advanced technologies, including smart and bio-inspired materials technologies, where in collaboration with A. Roberts and their students he pioneered computationally efficient low-dimensional reductions of complex time-dependent nonlinear mathematical models. His other important contributions at that time included fundamental problems in control theory and dynamic system evolution, as well as a range of problems in industrial & applied mathematics and numerical analysis.

Melnik is an expert in computational and applied mathematics with a number of important results in the coupled field theory as applied in physics, biology, and engineering. He is a leading computational analyst, well known for his contributions to the analysis of coupled multiscale phenomena, processes, and systems. His recent significant contributions are in the analysis of mutual influence between quantum and classical effects in complex systems, in particular in the study of coupled effects in low-dimensional nanostructures, as well as in bio-inspired engineering and biological systems.
