= Eric Iglesias =

Panamanian director and writer (born 1981)

Eric Iglesias (born April 5, 1981, in Panama City, Panama) is a Panamanian director and writer who resides in Los Angeles

== Education ==
Iglesias obtained his bachelor's degree in Electronic Engineering at the Universidad Católica Santa María La Antigua in Panama City, Panama. He later went to receive an M.F.A. in Filmmaking from the New York Film Academy in Universal Studios, CA.

== Films ==
Iglesias wrote and directed "Lucy", a highly acclaimed short film that participated in numerous film festivals, and deals with the immigration issues that the DREAM Act attempts to solve. The film was selected for the Short Film Corner in the 66th edition of the Cannes International Film Festival. He was the first Panamanian ever to present material the festival.
