= Ihor Melnyk =

Ihor Melnyk (Ukrainian: Ігор Мельник, Russian: Игорь Мельник; other transliterations: Igor; Melnik or Melnick) may refer to the following people:

- Ihor Melnyk (journalist) (born 1952), Ukrainian journalist
- Igor Melnik (born 1997), Russian football forward
- Ihor Melnyk (footballer, born 1982), Ukrainian footballer (FC SKA-Orbita Lviv)
- Ihor Melnyk (footballer, born 1983), Ukrainian football forward (Crimean Premier League)
- Ihor Melnyk (footballer, born 1986), Ukrainian football forward (Krymteplytsia and Oleksandriya)
