= Valentyna Melnyk =

New Zealand marketing academic

- Born: 1978 (age 47–48)
- Education: Tilburg University
- Scientific career
- Fields: loyalty programs
- Workplaces: Massey University
- Thesis: Creating effective loyalty programs knowing what (wo-)men want (2005)
- Website: http://www.massey.ac.nz/massey/expertise/profile.cfm?stref=008250

Valentyna Melnyk (born 1978) is a New Zealand marketing academic. She is currently a full professor at Massey University.

== Academic career ==
After a 2005 PhD titled 'Creating effective loyalty programs knowing what (wo-)men want' from Tilburg University, Melnyk moved to Massey University, rising to full professor.

Melnyk's work focuses on loyalty programs, but she appears frequently in the press.

== Selected works ==
- Melnyk, Valentyna, Stijn MJ Van Osselaer, and Tammo HA Bijmolt. "Are women more loyal customers than men? Gender differences in loyalty to firms and individual service providers." Journal of Marketing 73, no. 4 (2009): 82–96.
- Melnyk, Valentyna, Kristina Klein, and Franziska Völckner. "The double-edged sword of foreign brand names for companies from emerging countries." Journal of Marketing 76, no. 6 (2012): 21–37.
- Melnyk, Valentyna, and Stijn MJ van Osselaer. "Make me special: Gender differences in consumers’ responses to loyalty programs." Marketing Letters 23, no. 3 (2012): 545-559.
- Melnyk, Valentyna, and Tammo Bijmolt. "The effects of introducing and terminating loyalty programs." European Journal of Marketing 49, no. 3/4 (2015): 398–419.
- Klein, Kristina, and Valentyna Melnyk. "Speaking to the mind or the heart: effects of matching hedonic versus utilitarian arguments and products." Marketing Letters 27, no. 1 (2016): 131–142.
