= Serhiy Melnyk (footballer, born 1993) =

Ukrainian footballer

Personal information
- Full name: Serhiy Oleksandrovych Melnyk
- Date of birth: 25 June 1993 (age 33)
- Place of birth: Simferopol, Ukraine
- Height: 1.84 m (6 ft 0 in)
- Position: Striker

Youth career
- 2006–2009: SC Tavriya Simferopol

Senior career*
Years	Team	Apps	(Gls)
2009–2014	SC Tavriya Simferopol	8	(1)
2011	→ FC Krymteplytsia Molodizhne (loan)	7	(0)
2015	FC TSK Simferopol		
2015–2016	FC Yevpatoriya		
2016–2018	FC Krymteplytsia Molodizhne		

International career^{‡}
2010	Ukraine-17	6	(0)
2011	Ukraine-18	2	(0)
- * Club domestic league appearances and goals as of 30 November 2013 ‡ National team caps and goals as of 16 August 2013

Serhiy Melnyk (Ukrainian: Сергій Олександрович Мельник; born 25 June 1993) is a professional Ukrainian football striker.

== Club career ==
Melnyk was born in the Crimea and in early age he became attended the Sportive youth school of SC Tavriya Simferopol. His first trainer was Vyacheslav Portnov.

Melnyk made his debut for SC Tavriya Simferopol played in the second time against FC Chornomorets Odesa on 3 May 2013 in the Ukrainian Premier League.
