= Xenos (Greek) =

Greek word meaning roughly stranger

Xenos (from Ancient Greek ξένος (xénos); pl. xenoi) is a word used in the Greek language from Homer onwards. The most standard definition is 'stranger'. However, the word itself can be interpreted to mean different things based upon context, author and period of writing/speaking, signifying such divergent concepts as 'enemy' or 'stranger', a particular hostile interpretation, all the way to 'guest friend', one of the most hallowed concepts in the cultural rules of Greek hospitality.

== Meanings ==
Xenos can be translated both as 'foreigner' (in the sense of a person from another Greek state) and as a foreigner or traveler brought into a relationship of long-distance friendship. Xenos can also be used simply to assert that someone is not a member of one's community, that is, simply a foreigner and with no implication of reciprocity or relationship. Xenos generally refers to the variety of what a particular individual can be, specifically guest, host, stranger, friend, and, as previously mentioned, foreigner.

The ambiguity of the meaning of xenos is not a modern misunderstanding, but was, in fact, present in ancient Greece. Sophocles uses the vagueness of the word xenos in his tragedy Philoctetes, with Neoptolemus using the word exclusively for Philoctetes to indicate the uncertain relationship between the two characters. Xenos can be used to refer to guest-friends whose relationship is constructed under the ritual of xenia ('guest-friendship'). In this usage it is commonly translated as 'guest-friend' to distinguish it from the Greek word philos, which was used to refer to local friends and to relatives not strictly bound by xenia. The Greeks used this ambiguity because they thought strangers could be gods or goddesses in disguise, so they were always kind and respectful to strangers, because if it were a god, they could be blessed by that god or goddess.

== See also ==
- Xenia
