= Xenia (Greek) =

Ancient Greek concept of hospitality

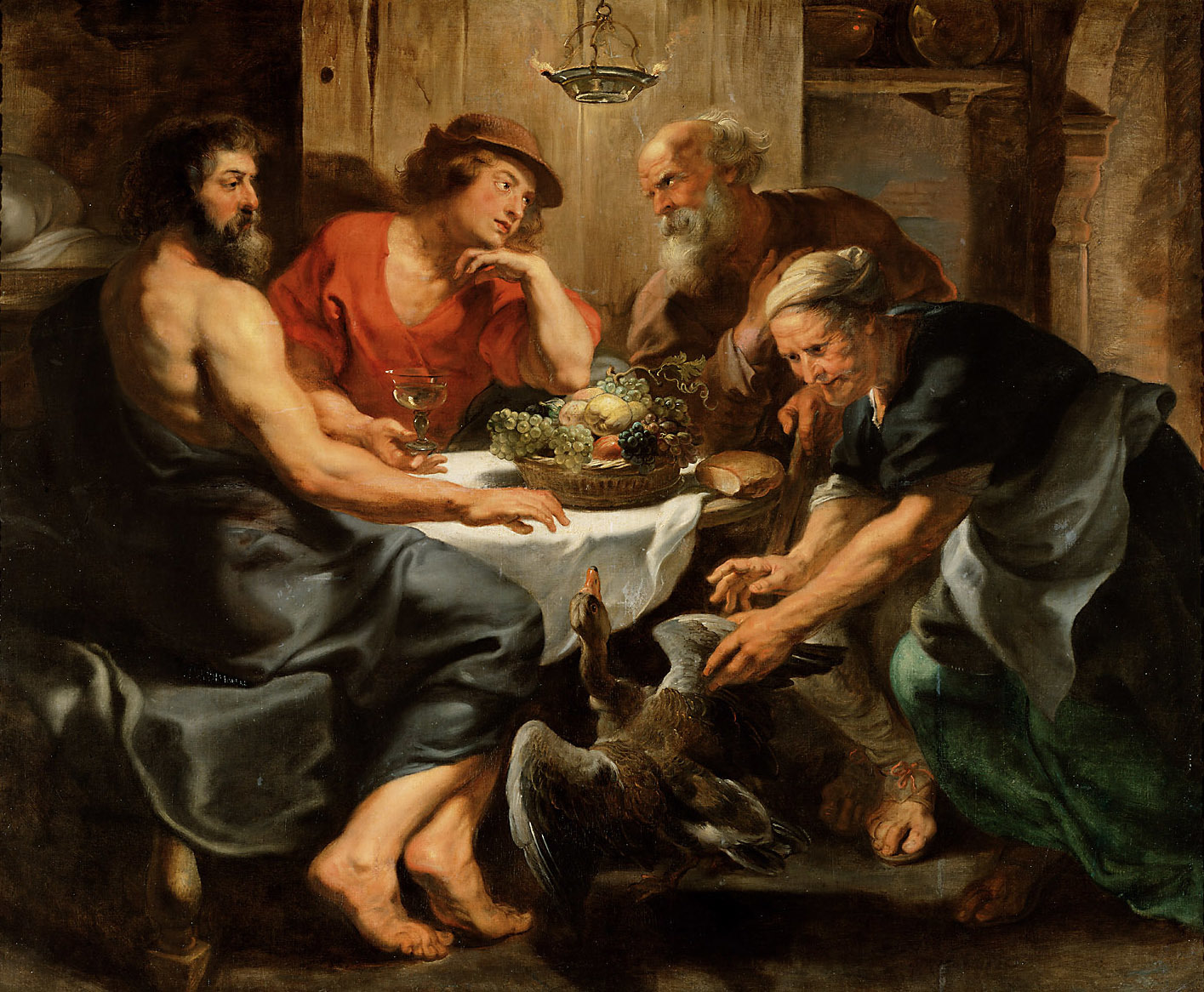
Jupiter and Mercurius in the House of Philemon and Baucis (1630–33) by the workshop of Rubens: Zeus and Hermes, testing a village's practice of hospitality, were received only by Baucis and Philemon, who were rewarded while their neighbors were punished.

Xenia (Ancient Greek: ξενία [kse'ni.a]) is an ancient Greek concept of hospitality. It is almost always translated as 'guest-friendship' or 'ritualized friendship'. It is an institutionalized relationship rooted in generosity, gift exchange, and reciprocity. Historically, hospitality towards foreigners and guests was understood as a moral obligation, as well as a political imperative. Hospitality towards foreigners honored Zeus Xenios (and Athene Xenia), patrons of foreigners.

The rituals of hospitality created and expressed a reciprocal relationship between guest and host expressed in both material benefits (e.g., gifts, protection, shelter) as well as non-material ones (e.g., favors, certain normative rights). The word is derived from xenos 'stranger'.

== Overview ==
Xenia consists of two basic rules:

1. The respect from hosts to guests. Hosts must be hospitable to guests and provide them with a bath, food, drink, gifts, and safe escort to their next destination. It is considered rude to ask guests questions, or even to ask who they are, before they have finished the meal provided to them.
2. The respect from guests to hosts. Guests must be courteous to their hosts and not be a threat or burden. Guests are expected to provide stories and news from the outside world. Most importantly, guests are expected to reciprocate if their hosts ever call upon them in their homes.

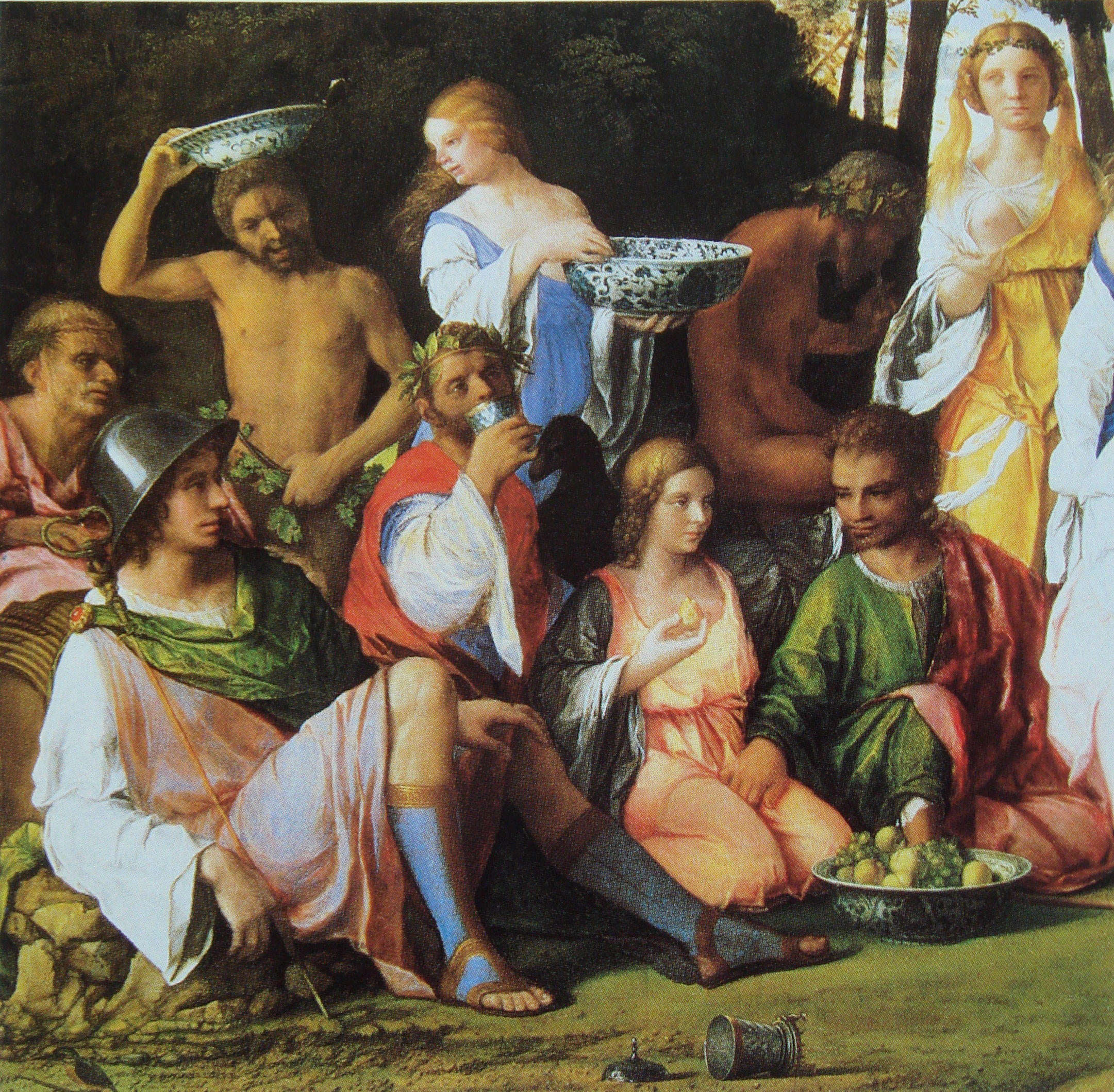
A renaissance painting displaying traditional exchanges of gifts between gods. This represents the material and social exchanges involved with xenia.

Xenia was considered to be particularly important due to the belief that gods mingled among the people; if one had poorly played host to a stranger, there was the risk of incurring the wrath of a god disguised as the stranger. Notable among them is the Greek god Zeus, who is sometimes called Zeus Xenios in his role as a protector of strangers. This normalized theoxeny or theoxenia, wherein human beings demonstrate their virtue by extending hospitality to a humble stranger (xenos), who turns out to be a disguised deity (theos).

These stories caution mortals that any guest should be treated as if potentially a disguised divinity, due to both a deity's capacity to instill punishment or grant reward for their behavior, who highly valued generosity and welcoming attitudes towards strangers. A parallel caution occurs in the New Testament Book of Hebrews, which admonishes Christians, "Be not forgetful to entertain strangers: for thereby some have entertained angels unawares."

The term theoxenia also covered entertaining and hosting among the gods themselves, a popular subject in classical art, which was revived at the Renaissance in works depicting a Feast of the Gods. Deities were looked up to as symbols of virtue, and they were often depicted as performing theoxenia amongst themselves, reinforcing the established idea of xenia as a fundamental Greek custom. While these practices of guest-friendship are centered on the gods, they would become common among the Greeks in incorporating xenia into their customs and manners. Indeed, xenia would become a standard practice throughout all of Greece as a custom in the affairs of humans interacting with humans as well as humans interacting with the gods, which was culturally reinforced through understandings of gods interacting with gods as well.

== In politics ==
=== Platonic philosophy ===
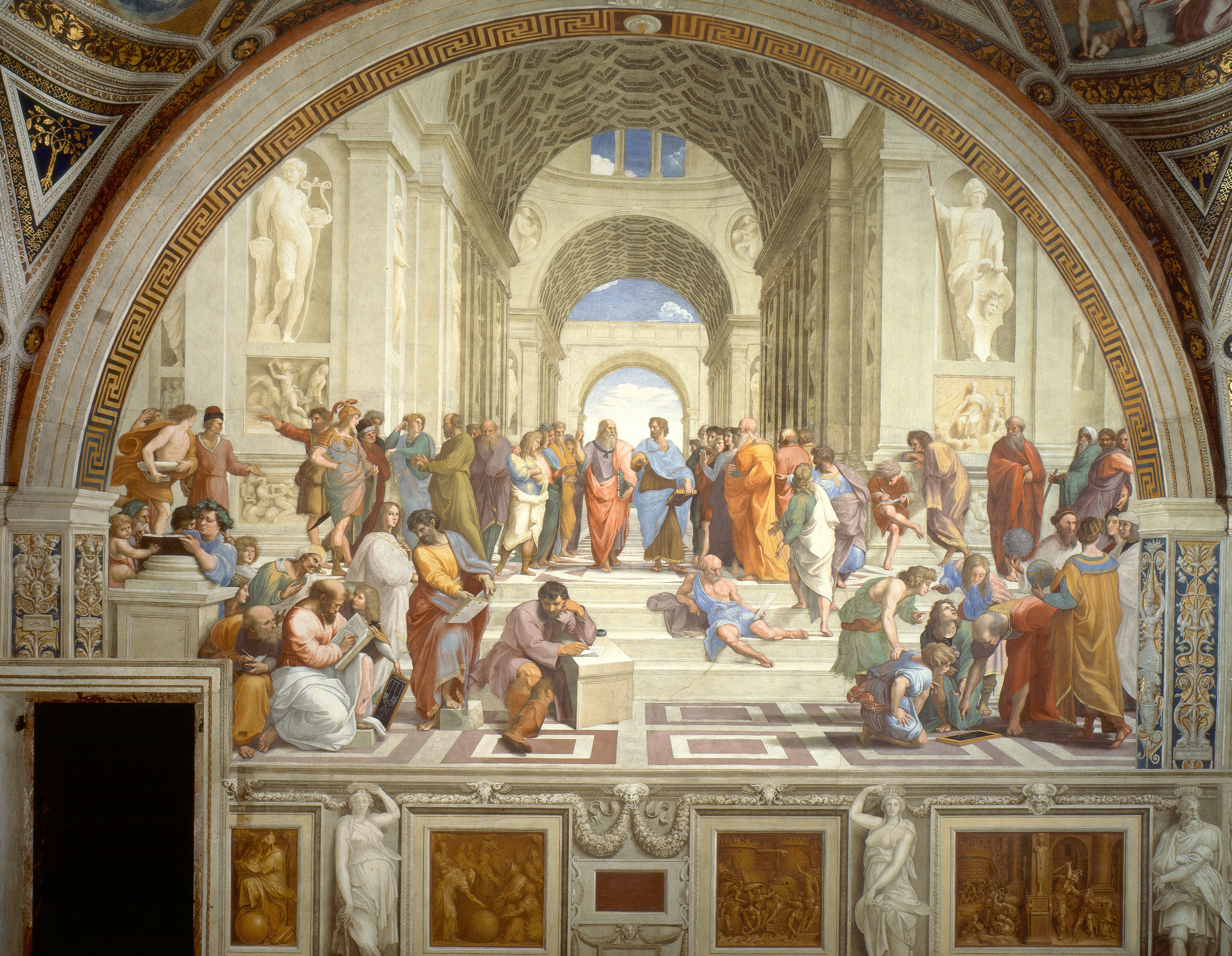
The School of Athens 1509-1511 by Raffaello Sanzio da Urbino depicts Plato discussing philosophy.

Plato describes four types of xenoi or strangers in need of hosting, in his work Laws:

1. "The first and inevitable immigrant is the one who chooses summer, as a rule, for his annual visits, in the fashion of migratory birds— and, like birds, the most of these cross the sea, just as if they had wings, for the sake of making gain by their trading, and fly over to foreign cities during the summer season; this stranger must be received, when he comes to the city, at the markets, harbors, and public buildings outside the city, by the officials in charge thereof; and they shall have a care lest any such strangers introduce any innovation, and they shall duly dispense justice to them, and shall hold such intercourse as is necessary with them, but to the least extent possible."
2. "The second type of stranger is he who is an inspector, in the literal sense, with his eyes, and with his ears also of all that appertains to musical exhibitions: for all such there must be lodgings provided at the temples, to afford them friendly accommodation, and the priests and temple-keepers must show them care and attention, until they have sojourned for a reasonable length of time and have seen and heard all that they intended; after which, if no harm has been done or suffered by them, they shall be dismissed. And for these the priests shall act as judges, in case anyone injures one of them or one of them injures anyone else, if the claim does not exceed fifty drachmae; but if any greater claim is made, the trial for such strangers must take place before the market-stewards."
3. "The third type which requires a public reception is he who comes from another country on some public business: he must be received by none but the generals, hipparchs and taxiarchs, and the care of a stranger of this kind must be entirely in the hands of the official with whom he lodges, in conjunction with the prytaneis."
4. "The fourth type of stranger comes rarely, if ever: should there, however, come at any time from another country an inspector similar to those we send abroad, he shall come on these conditions:—First, he shall be not less than fifty years old; and secondly, his purpose in coming must be to view some noble object which is superior in beauty to anything to be found in other States, or else to display to another State something of that description. Every visitor of this kind shall go as an unbidden guest to the doors of the rich and wise, he being both rich and wise himself; and he shall go also to the abode of the General Superintendent of Education, believing himself to be a proper guest for such a host, or to the house of one of those who have won a prize for virtue; and when he has communed with some of these, by the giving and receiving of information, he shall take his departure, with suitable gifts and distinctions bestowed on him as a friend by friends."

Plato makes a list of such xenoi in an effort to promote legal responsibility to uphold the domain of Zeus Xenios. Plato likewise makes mention of Zeus Xenios while discussing his journey to meet Dion of Syracuse in The Seventh Letter, and mentions the importance of his domain.

=== Historical role in diplomacy ===
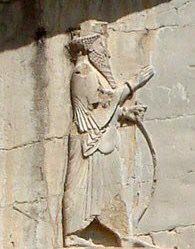
Relief of King Xerxes I of Persia, who engaged in xenia with Pythios the Lydian.

Historian Gabriel Herman lays out the use of xenia in political alliances in the Near East. He analyzes the exchange of xenia between King Xerxes and Pythios the Lydian, wherein Xerxes is made into Pythios's xenos. This exchange allowed for more peaceful political relations between both figures, and established a tone of generosity and brotherhood between the two. This type of exchange was also known to have been done through messengers, without the principals meeting face-to-face.

Herman connects the phenomena of xenia to several historical cultural exchange customs throughout Afro-Eurasia. He connects xenia to studies of African tribal societies studied by Harry Tegnaeus, and certain traditional notions of African tribal brotherhood. Separately, he connects xenia as the predecessor to vassal and lord dynamics in later medieval times.

Herman goes on to analyze instances of xenia in political and social relations:

"...No less important an element in forging the alliance was the exchange of highly specialized category of gifts, designated in our sources as xénia (as distinct from xenía, the term of the relationship itself) or dora. It was as important to give such gifts as to receive, and refusal to reciprocate as tantamount to a declaration of hostility. Mutual acceptance of the gifts, on the other hand, was a clear mark of the beginning of friendship."

To reinforce this, Herman notes out several instances of xenia's usage in literature. He points to the account of Odysseus giving Iphitos a sword and spear after having been given a formidable bow while saying they were "the first token of loving guest-friendship". Herman also shows that Herodotus holds "the conclusion of an alliance and the exchange of gifts appeared as two inseparable acts: Polykrates, having seized the government in Samos, "concluded a pact of xenia with Amasis king of Egypt, sending and receiving from him gifts (dora)". Within the ritual it was important that the return gift be offered immediately after receiving a gift with each commensurate rather than attempting to surpass each other in value. The initial gifts in such an exchange would fall somewhere between being symbolic but useless, and of high use-value but without any special symbolic significance. The initial gifts would serve as both object and symbol. Herman points out that these goods were not viewed as trade or barter, "for the exchange was not an end in itself, but a means to another end." While trade ends with the exchange, the ritual exchange "was meant to symbolize the establishment of obligations which, ideally, would last for ever."

== In architecture ==
Xenia as a custom appears to have been a critical factor that helped determine layouts of homes and of common areas. In the classical work De Architectura, the Roman architect Vitruvius comments on how xenia was expressed in ancient Greek home layout and decoration. In particular, he emphasizes the decorative paintings of food in guest apartments of Greek homes:

When the Greeks became more luxurious, and their circumstances more opulent, they began to provide dining rooms, chambers, and storerooms of provisions for their guests from abroad, and on the first day they would invite them to dinner, sending them on the next chickens, eggs, vegetables, fruits, and other country produce. This is why artists called pictures representing the things which were sent to guests xenia."

The focus on creating distinct space to house strangers is shown to be a movement connected to both piety and opulence, due to how the housing of guests was seen as a virtue.

Displays of wealth in decoration and in parting gifts for guests likewise serve as both a status symbol and as a demonstration of xenia.

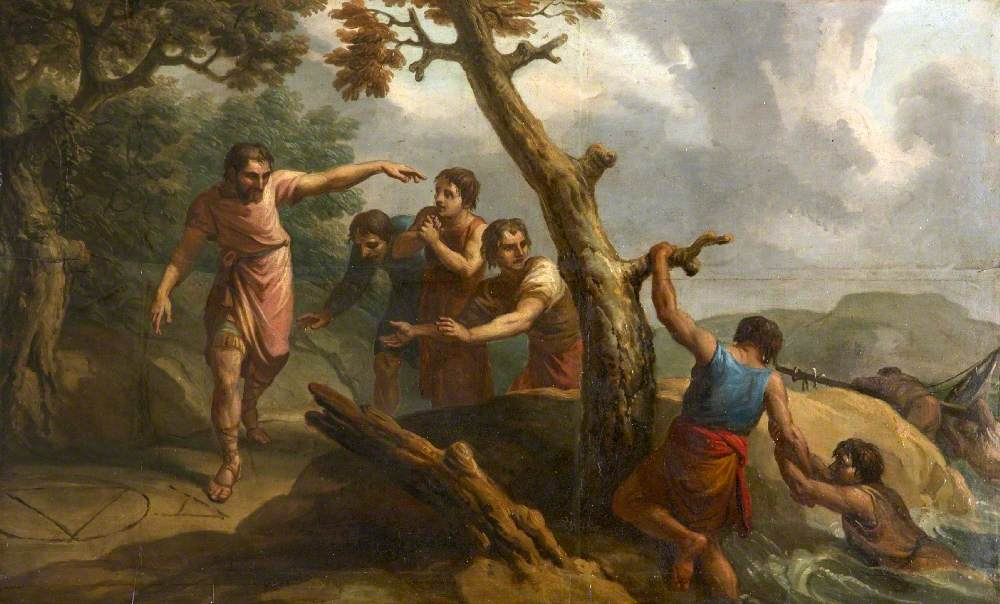
Aristippus and His Companions after Being Shipwrecked, Seeing Mathematical Diagrams, Realize the Land Was Inhabited (1726-1796 by Antiono Zucchi shows Aristippus at the shipwreck site prior to aid by the Rhodians.

Architectural theorist Simon Weir explained how Vitruvius refers to xenia at the beginning of Book 6 of De Architectura, in the anecdote of Aristippus shipwrecked and receiving hospitality from the Rhodians. He explained how Vitruvius' understanding of xenia extended beyond the home, and involved general welcoming exchanges between strangers. Prior to Vitruvius, xenia still appears pervasive in the work of the earliest ancient Greek architects, whose work was always concerned with public buildings and the hosting of guests rather than the design of private residences. In particular, architectural historian, Lisa Landrum has also revealed the presence of xenia in Greek theatre onstage and offstage.

== In Greek literature ==
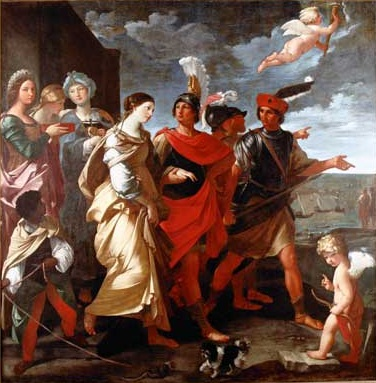
The Abduction of Helen 1628-1629 is an oil painting by Guido Reni: it depicts the forceful seizure of Helen of Troy by the hero Paris. The kidnapping of Helen, who was already married, was a violation of the domain of Zeus Xenios that prompted the start of the Trojan War.

As a part of how xenia was culturally reinforced, demonstrations of theoxenia and xenia were present through major works of Greek literature.

=== In the Iliad ===
- The Trojan War described in the Iliad of Homer resulted from a violation of xenia. Paris, from the house of Priam of Troy, was a guest of Menelaus, king of Mycenaean Sparta, but seriously transgressed the bounds of xenia by abducting his host's wife, Helen. Therefore, the Achaeans were required by duty to Zeus to avenge this transgression, which, as a violation of xenia, was an insult to Zeus's authority.
- Diomedes and Glaucus meet in no man's land. However, Diomedes does not want to fight another man descended from the Gods, so he asks Glaucus about his lineage. Glaucus reveals he is the grandson of the hero Bellerophon, who was once hosted by Diomedes's grandfather Oeuneus. Upon revealing this information, Diomedes realizes that their fathers had practiced xenia with each other, and they are guest-friends. Therefore, they decide not to fight, but to continue their hereditary guest-friendship by trading armor.
- Hector speaks to Ajax about exchanging presents so that people will remember them for dropping their hatred and becoming friends. While this is not a traditional example of xenia, it does demonstrate the power of friendship in the Greek culture.
- Book 9: Achilles invites Odysseus into his tent and asks Patroclus to make the strongest wine for them to drink. Patroclus also brings meat with the wine. The men eat and have light chatter before Odysseus delivers Agamemnon's offer to Achilles.
- Book 18: Hephaestus hosts Thetis in his home. Concerned with making Thetis comfortable, Hephaestus lays out entertainment and puts away his tools.
- Book 24: In the last book of the Iliad, Priam supplicates Achilles in an attempt to recover the body of his son Hector. Instead of turning him out as the enemy, Achilles abides by the rules of xenia and allows him to stay.

=== In the Odyssey ===
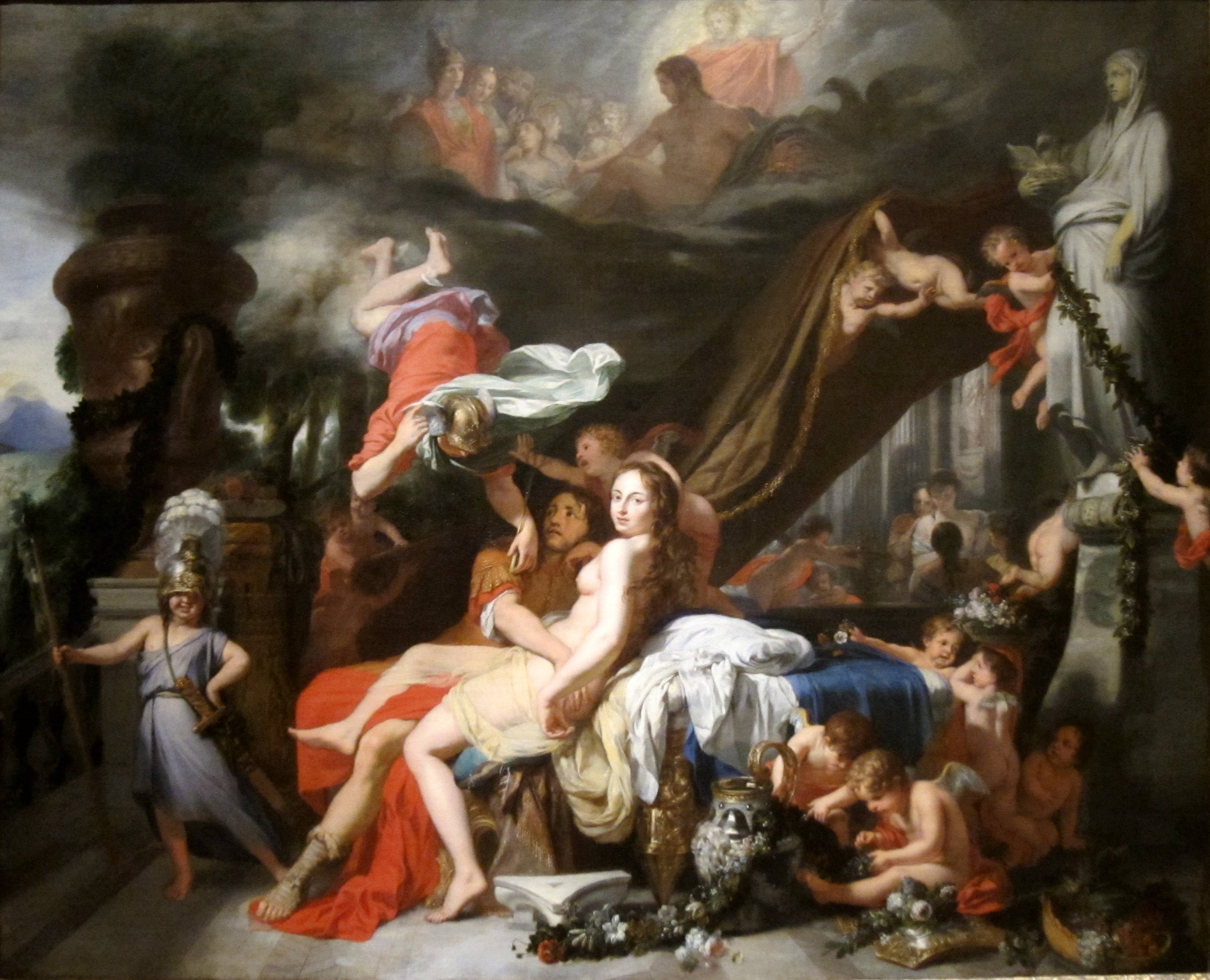
Hermes Ordering Calypso to Release Odysseus (1670) is a painting by Gerad de Lairesse shows the god Hermes intervening & forcing Calypso to free Odysseus from her island.

xenia is an important theme in Homer's Odyssey.

- Every household in the epic is seen alongside xenia:
  - Odysseus' house is inhabited by suitors with demands beyond the bounds of xenia.
  - Menelaus and Nestor's houses are seen when Telemachus visits.
  - There are many other households observed in the epic, including those of Circe, Calypso, and the Phaeacians.
- The Phaeacians, particularly Nausicaä, were famed for their immaculate application of xenia, as the princess and her maids offered to bathe Odysseus and then led him to the palace to be fed and entertained. After sharing his story with the Phaeacians they agree to take Odysseus to his home land. In a new rule, he states that you should not beat your host in a competition because it would be rude and could damage the relationship.
- Calypso, a fair goddess, had wanted to keep Odysseus in her cavern as her husband, but he refused. Circe had also failed to keep Odysseus in her halls as her mate. Although both of these women had fine homes and fine things to offer him, their hospitality was too much for Odysseus. He instead left each with the goal of returning to Ithaca and reclaiming his family and his home. Sometimes hospitality was unwanted or was given unwillingly.
- Telemachus shows xenia in Book One to the disguised Athena by graciously welcoming her into his own home and offering her food. He even moves her chair away from the suitors who are rude.
- Eumaeus the swineherd shows xenia to the disguised Odysseus, claiming guests come under the protection of Zeus. When one of the suitors, Ctesippus, mocks the disguised Odysseus and hurls an ox's hoof at him as a "gift", mocking xenia, though Odysseus dodges this, Telemachus says if he had hit the guest, he would have run Ctesippus through with his spear. The other suitors are worried, saying Ctesippus is "doomed" if the stranger is a disguised god. As well as this, whenever Homer describes the details of xenia, he uses the same formula every time: for example, the maid pouring wine into the gold cups, etc.
- The suitors, however, display bad xenia. They continue to eat Penelope and Telemachus out of house and home, as well as being rude not only to each other but to Telemachus and the guests, such as disguised Athena and Odysseus.

=== In the Argonautica ===
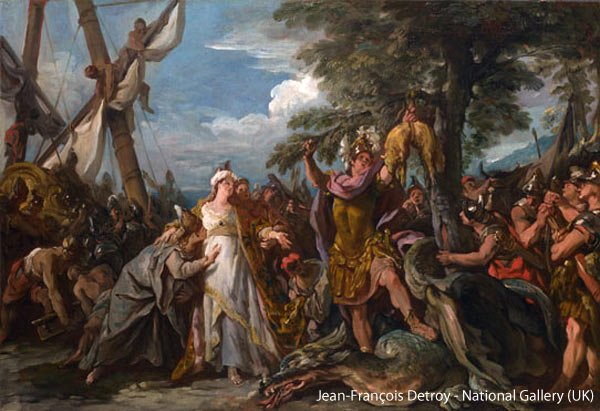
Jason displaying the golden fleece, which he found with the aid of Meidea.

The Argonautica, written by Apollonius of Rhodes, takes place before the Iliad and the Odyssey. Since the story takes place during Greek times, the theme of xenia is shown throughout the narrative.

- When the Argonauts are warmly received by King Kyzicus of the Doliones who provides safe harbor and sacrificial materials to help the Argonauts consecrate a new altar to Apollo.In the opposite harbor xenia is violated by the monstrous earth-born who attack the Argonauts.
- The King of Bebrykians, Amykos, makes the Argonauts fight to be able to leave. Polydeukes volunteers himself to participate in the boxing match.This is a clear violation of xenia, and the Argonauts become worried when they reach their next destination later on in Book 2, when the Argonauts are on an island after a storm caused by Zeus. The Argonauts call out, asking for the strangers to be kind to them and treat them fairly. They realize that Jason and the men on the island are related by Jason's father's side of the family. The men provide clothing, sacrifice with them, and share a meal before the Argonauts leave the island in the morning.
- When Jason talks about going to Aietes's palace, he says that they will receive a warm welcome and surely he will follow the rules of xenia.
- The first time the Argonauts reach Aietes's palace, also the first time Medeia is depicted in love with Jason due to Eros, Aietes has a feast prepared. The Argonauts are served, and after their meal Aietes begins to ask questions about the Argonauts' purpose and voyage to his kingdom.

== See also ==
- Bellerophon, protected by xenia, even though falsely accused of raping his host's wife
- Genesis 18 and 19 in the Hebrew Bible, where hospitality is shown to strangers who are later revealed to be divine
- Grith – related concept in the modern Heathen religious movement
- Hospitium – Greco-Roman tradition of hospitality
- Ixion, described in Greek mythology as a flagrant violator of xenia
- Omotenashi – Japanese tradition of hospitality, parallel of the Ancient Greek tradition xenia
- Ubuntu (philosophy) – Southern African philosophy that includes hospitality
- Atithi Devo Bhava – Hindu mantra on treating the guests with reverence akin to that of deities
- Xenos (Greek) – stranger, foreigner, alien
