= Xenia of Rome =

5th-century Christian saint

Saint Xenia of Rome
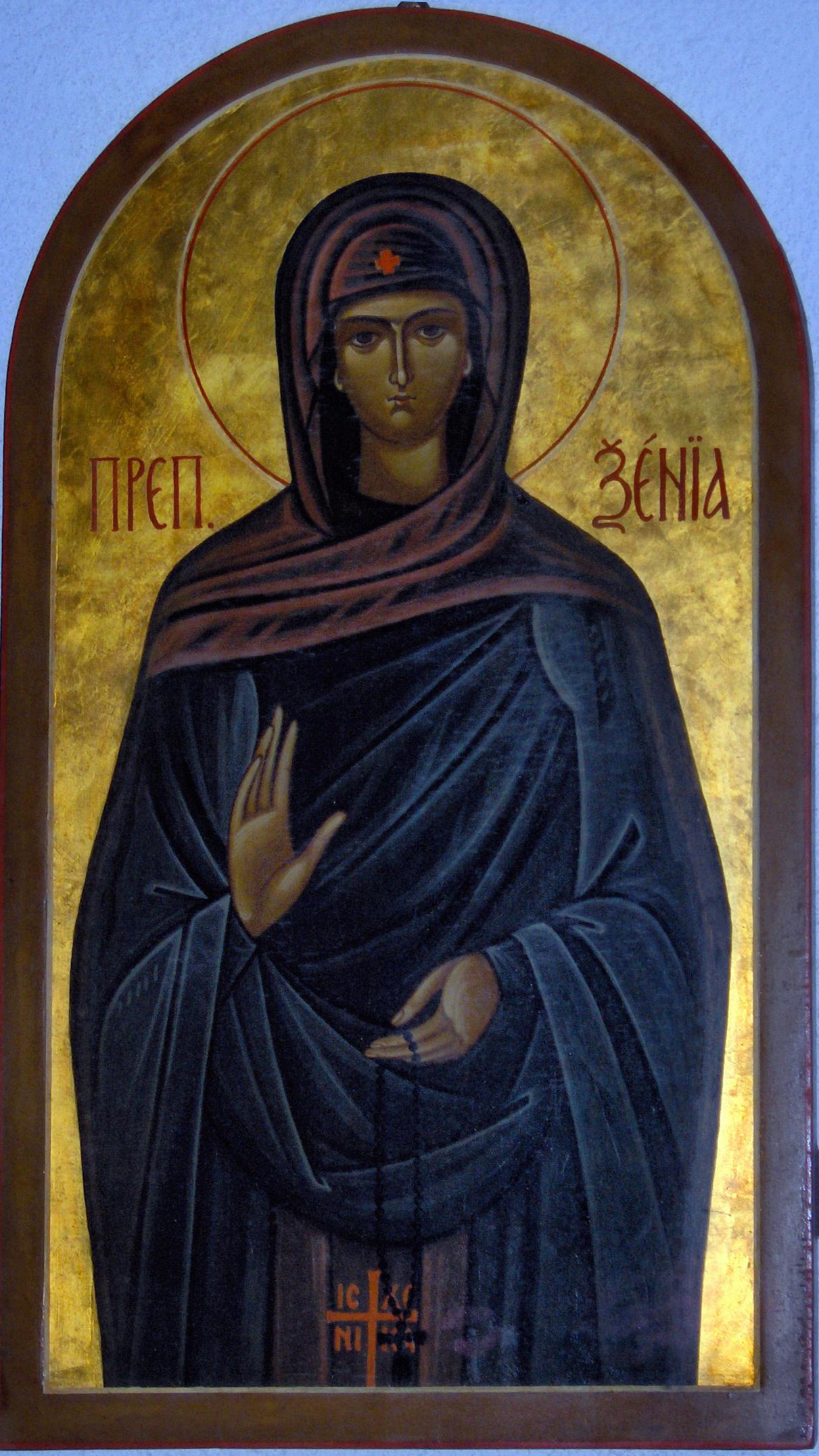
- Icon of Saint Xenia; crypt of the Russian Orthodox Church Chiesa di Cristo Salvatore San Remo, Italy
- Died: c. 450
- Venerated in: Eastern Orthodox Church; Roman Catholic Church
- Feast: January 24/February 6

Xenia the Righteous of Rome (Greek: Ξένια της Ρώμης) was a saint of the 5th century, honored by some Christian Churches, including Orthodox and Catholic. Xenia, originally born Eusebia, was the only daughter of a wealthy Senator in Rome. She and two devoted servants of hers, left to avoid an arranged marriage. She escaped first to the island of Kos, then on to Mylasa, in modern day Turkey, where she accepted name "Xenia" (stranger). She wanted to hide in a deserted place not to be discovered by her parents.

Upon arrival, Xenia began a church dedicated to the Saint Stephen and a woman's monastery. Soon after, she was made a deaconess by Bishop Paul of Mylasa.

It is written of her that she "helped everyone: for the destitute, she was a benefactress; for the grief-stricken, a comforter; for sinners, a guide to repentance. She possessed a deep humility, accounting herself the worst and most sinful of all."

The Feast of St. Xenia is celebrated in the Orthodox church and Catholic church on January 24, the day on which she died. It was alleged that "during her funeral, a luminous wreath of stars surrounding a radiant cross appeared over the monastery in the heavens." She is said to have foreseen her own death.

== Eastern Orthodox Troparion and Kontakion ==
- Troparion — Tone 3

Living the life of a stranger in the world, / you estranged yourself from every sin; / you abandoned comforts and fleeting honors / and betrothed yourself to your Immortal Bridegroom. / Glorious Xenia, entreat Christ our God to grant us His great mercy.

- Kontakion — Tone 2

We celebrate the memory of the life you lived as a stranger in the world, / and as we honor you with love, O Xenia, / we praise Christ, who gave you power to grant healing to all; / ever pray to Him on our behalf.
