= Tengku Mahmood Mahyideen =

Malay military officer, senior civil servant and politician

His Highness Dato' Tengku Mahmood Mahyideen تڠكو محمود مهيدين DPMK SMK MBE
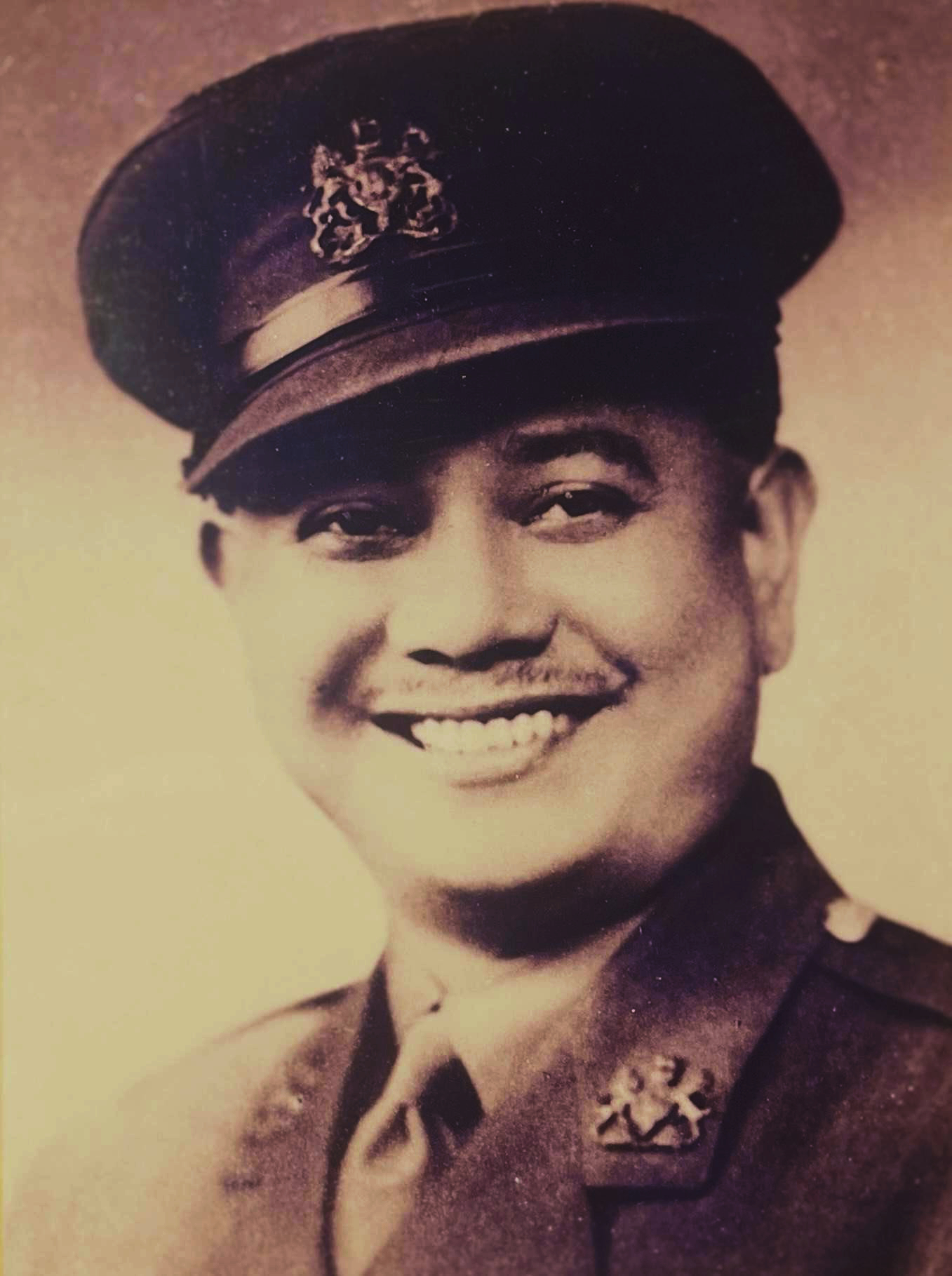
- Tengku Mahmood Mahyideen in Force 136's formals.

Founder and Chairman GAMPAR
- In office 1948–1953

Director of Education (Kelantan)
- In office 1938–1942
- Born: Tengku Mahmood Mahyideen bin Tengku Abdul Kadir Kamaruddeen; 28 October 1908; Chabang Tiga, Patani, Siam (now known as Chabang Tiko, Pattani, part of Thailand)
- Died: 12 February 1954 (aged 45); Pantai Cinta Berahi, Kelantan, Federation of Malaya (now part of Malaysia)
- Resting place: Kelantan Royal Mausoleum
- Other names: Tengku Mahmud Mahyideen, Mahmud Mahyideen, Raja Mopeng (Radio's pseudonym)
- Education: Penang Free School; Assumption College (Thailand)
- Occupations: Businessman; government servant; radio announcer; spymaster; reserve military officer
- Years active: 1928–1954
- Known for: The icon of the independence movement, the Malay people's first SOE agent, and the reformer of Malay education
- Political party: PKMM (1945); UMNO (1950-1954)
- Other political affiliations: GAMPAR (1948-1953)
- Opponent: Onn Jaafar (UMNO)
- Spouse: Tengku Zainab Tuan Long Senik (m. 1930)
- Children: 4
- Awards: Order of the Crown of Kelantan (DPMK); Member of the Order of the British Empire (MBE)
- House: Long Yunus
- Father: Sultan Abdul Kadir of Patani
- Mother: Che Maimunah (birth mother); Tengku Kembang (step-mother)
- Military career
- Allegiance: Allied forces
- Branch: Unfederated Malay States Volunteer Forces (1939–1942); British Indian Army (1942–1945); Special Operations Executive (1942–1945)
- Service years: 1939–1945
- Rank: Sergeant (Unfederated Malay States Volunteer Forces); Major (British Indian Army)
- Nicknames: Harimau Malaya (Malayan Tiger); Lion of Malaya
- Units: Kelantan Volunteer Force (1939–1942); Force 136 (1942–1945)
- Commands: Malay Section of Force 136
- Conflict: Franco–Thai War: World War II; Malayan campaign; Battle of Kota Bharu; Battle of Singapore; Operation Beacon; Operation Fighter; Operation Gustavus; Operation Hebrides; Operation Oatmeal; Operation Zipper

Tengku Mahmood Mahyideen (Note: Jawi script: تڠكو محمود مهيدين formally Tengku Mahmood Mahyideen Bin Tengku Abdul Kadir Kamaruddin, (Jawi: تڠكو محمود مهيدين بن تڠكو عبدالقادر قمرالدين)) (Jawi: تڠكو محمود مهيدين; 28 October 1908 – 12 February 1954), also known by his nickname Harimau Malaya (Malayan Tiger), was a Siamese-born Malayan–Pattani prince, freedom fighter, businessman, radio announcer, and spymaster in the service of the British Special Operations Executive (SOE). Widely recognised as an "icon of the independence movement", he was regarded by some as a pretender to the throne of the historical Patani Kingdom.

Mahyideen played a role as a reformer of Malays education in Kelantan, acted as a patron of school cooperatives in the state, and established himself as an entrepreneur. During the Second World War, he became the first Malay to be recruited as an SOE agent, gaining renown for his leadership of Force 136's Malay Section. He attained the rank of Major, the highest military rank given by the British to a Malay officer during the war. In the post-war years, he served as a member of the Federal Legislative Council of Malaya and founded the Greater Patani Malay Association (Malay: Gabongan Melayu Patani Raya, GAMPAR), of which he was chairman.

Because of variations in the transliteration of Jawi script into the Latin alphabet, his name has appeared in several spellings, including Tengku Mahmood Mahyiddeen and Tengku Mahmud Mahyideen. Other variants such as Mahydeen, Mahyiddin, Mahyidden, and Muyidu'd-in were also used by him in personal writings and official correspondence.

== Early life and education ==
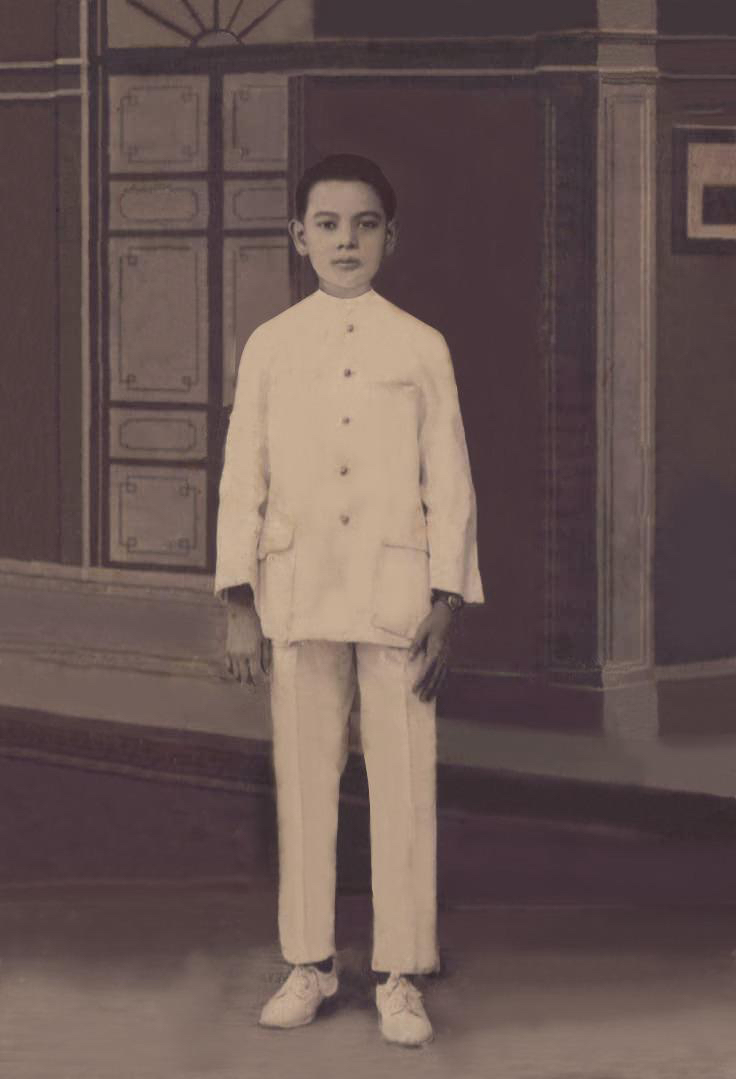
Tengku Mahmood Mahyideen during the early stage of his life (1916–1929).

Tengku Mahmood Mahyideen bin Tengku Abdul Kadir Kamaruddeen was born on 28 October 1908 at the Istana Chabang Tiga ("Palace of Chabang Tiga") in Patani, Siam (present-day Thailand). He was the son of Tengku Abdul Kadir Kamaruddeen, the 27th and last King of Patani, who reigned as Sultan Abdul Kadir Kamaruddin Syah from 1898 until his deposition by the Rattanakosin Kingdom in 1902, and his third wife, Tengku Maimunah.

Through his father, he was a descendant of Raja Long Yunus, a prince of the Patani Kingdom who united Kelantan and ruled as its first Raja from 1763 until 1795. His mother, Che Maimunah (styled Tengku Maimunah after marriage), (Note: In Malay nobility, the prefix Tengku, along with its variations such as Tunku and Tengku, can be translated as "Royal Prince" or "Royal Princess" because Malay, like many Asian languages, uses gender-neutral nouns. As a formal title, it is equivalent to "Prince" or "Princess" in English.) belonged to the House of Long Gaffar, the ruling family of Southern Kelantan. He was the sixth of his father's seven children and his second son. Following the death of his mother in 1912, he was sent to Kelantan to be raised by his stepmother, Tengku Kembang, who was Tengku Abdul Kadir's first wife.

Mahmood Mahyideen began his education in 1916 at Padang Garong Government School in Kota Bharu, later transferring to the Kota Bharu Islamic Religious Council School, where he studied for two years. In 1920, he was sent to Bangkok to continue his studies at Assumption College. He returned to Kelantan in 1923, shortly before his father led the Belukar Semak rebellion against Siamese rule. He continued his education at Penang Free School from 1925 to 1928 and on 18 June 1933 obtained the Senior Cambridge Certificate (Honours, I.M.S.).

He was awarded a scholarship to pursue medical studies at King Edward VII Medical College in Singapore, but he declined the offer, choosing instead to assist his father in the struggle for Patani's independence.

== Personal life ==
In 1930, Tengku Mahmood married Tengku Zainab binti Long Senik Mulut Merah, a Kelantanese princess. Her father, Long Senik Mulut Merah, emerged victorious in a civil war and ascended the throne of Kelantan as Sultan Muhammad II, reigning from 1836 to 1886. Both Tengku Mahmood and Tengku Zainab were distant cousins, descended from Raja Long Yunus, the first Raja of Kelantan.

== Entrepreneurship ==
Following the completion of his secondary education in 1928, Tengku Mahmood's father instructed him to join the Kelantan Civil Service in order to acquire administrative experience. However, he chose instead to pursue a business career and established a shop in Kota Bharu known as Kedai Kita, which specialised in selling bicycles from the Mead Cycle Company, a well-known British manufacturer.

Through his bicycle trade, Tengku Mahmood observed the difficult social conditions faced by Malay women and girls. While delivering bicycles across Kelantan, he noted that many girls were married at a young age, with some dying in childbirth, which led to widespread neglect of education for women. These early observations later influenced his advocacy for women's education reform when he became Superintendent of Education.

He later expanded his ventures under the business name T. Mahmood Mahyiddeen, General Importer, Stationer, Commission & Newsagent. The company secured a monopoly on the import of rice and salt from Thailand into the states of Kelantan and Terengganu and operated successfully until the outbreak of the Battle of Kota Bharu during the Second World War. The business proved highly profitable, and Tengku Mahmood amassed considerable wealth.

== Entering the civil service and Kelantan's education reform ==
In 1931, through his bicycle business, Tengku Mahmood Mahyideen became acquainted with T. P. Coe, a British official attached to the office of the British Adviser to the Sultan of Kelantan. The two frequently exchanged ideas, during which Tengku Mahmood expressed concern regarding the limited access to modern education among Malays in Kelantan.

By 1933, after his business had become self-sustaining, he entered the Kelantan State Education Department on the recommendation of his brother-in-law, Sultan Ahmad of Kelantan, and the British Adviser's office. His first appointment was as Acting Inspector of Malay Schools (Malay: Pemangku Nazir Sekolah-sekolah Melayu). He subsequently served in a number of posts within the department, including Inspector of Schools (Malay: Nazir Sekolah), Superintendent of Schools (Malay: Penguasa Pelajaran) and, at the peak of his civil service career, State Education Officer of Kelantan (present-day Director of Education, Kelantan State; Malay: Pengarah Pendidikan Negeri Kelantan).

His work was primarily directed towards encouraging wider enrolment in government-run secular schools, particularly among Malay children, who traditionally favoured Islamic pondok institutions. He was also an early advocate for the education of girls in Kelantan, promoting their inclusion in formal schooling at a time when female students were seldom enrolled in secular education.

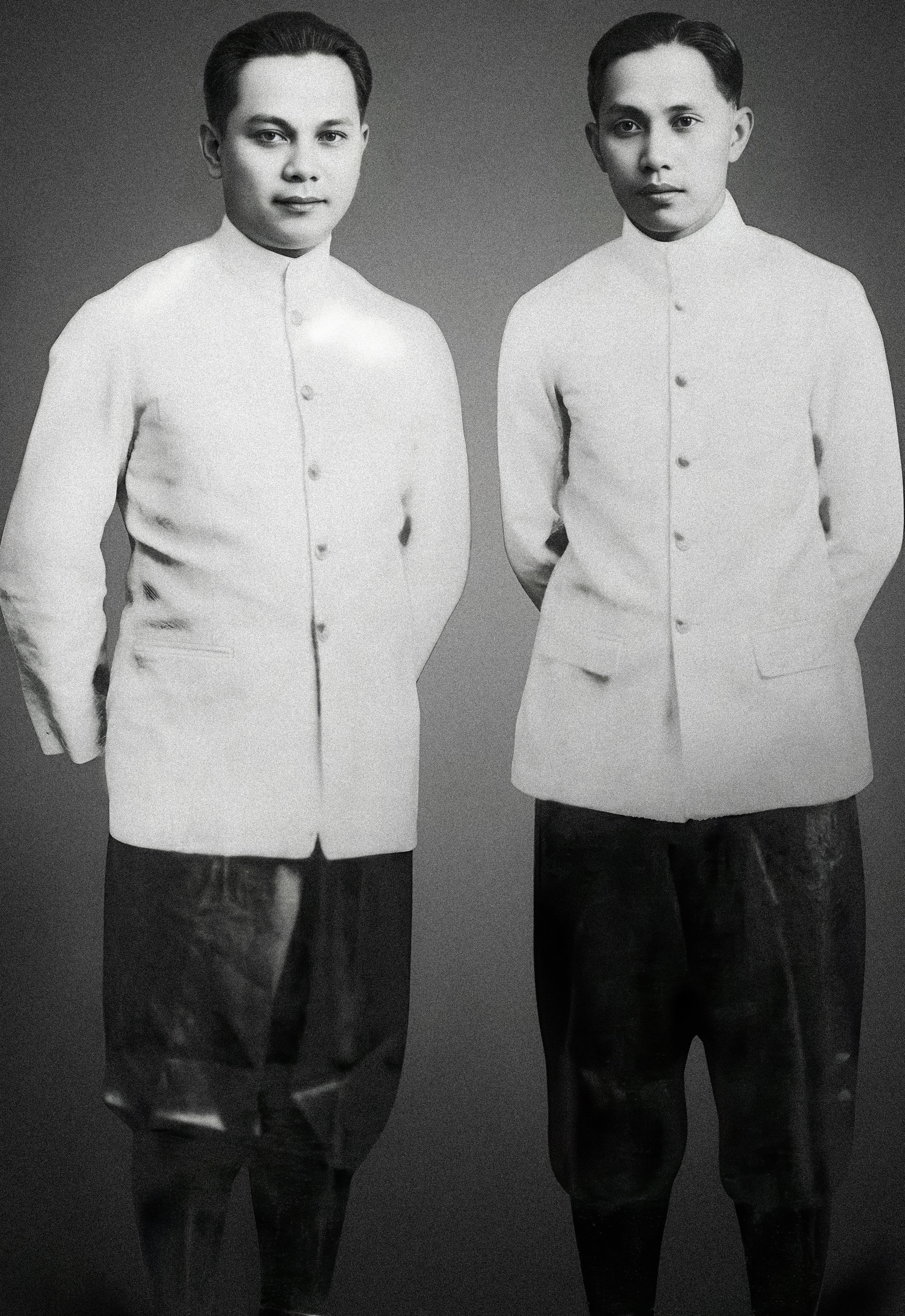
Tengku Mahmood Mahyideen (left) with Nik Ahmad Kamil (right)

=== Ismail English School ===
On 30 April 1935, Tengku Mahmood Mahyideen, accompanied by Nik Ahmad Kamil Nik Mahmood (then Secretary of the Kelantan State Government), held an initial meeting and discussion with A.C. Baker and J.A. Harvey at the British Adviser's residence. This discussion led to the formation of the Kelantan Education Committee, specifically tasked with managing the establishment of an English school in Kelantan.

Ismail English School was founded on 5 January 1936. The school was placed under a separate administration from the Malay Schools, which were managed by the Kelantan Islamic Religious Council. Its objectives were to provide education aligned with the Junior Cambridge Standard, select scholarship recipients, and fill vacancies in the Lower Grade Clerical Service.

The successful establishment of Ismail English School marked a significant advancement in education. Tengku Mahmood Mahyideen was regarded as "The prime mover of establishing Government English Schools, the first of its kind in Kelantan."

=== Government Girls English School ===
On 16 December 1937, the Kelantan State Government agreed to establish the Government Girls English School. The school was built in an area on Jalan Telipot (now known as Zainab English School), named after the Consort of the Sultan of Kelantan (Tengku Ampuan Kelantan) at the time.

Initially, Zainab English School enrolled 19 students exclusively from affluent families. Later, it began admitting girls from the general public, particularly those residing around Kota Bharu. The initial conclusion drawn from Tengku Mahmood Mahyideen's plans to establish these educational institutions was that progress was not as straightforward as anticipated.

He faced numerous obstacles and challenges. The primary issue was overcoming the British colonial administration's belief that educating Malays would burden their governance. Additionally, shifting the Malay community's early skepticism toward vernacular education proved difficult. However, the success of Tengku Mahmood Mahyideen's proposals to establish English schools demonstrated that his ideas were sound and deserved support, particularly from the state government.

"When I first took charge of the Education Department, between 800 and 1,000 letters were distributed to persuade parents and briefly explain the importance of education..."

— Tengku Mahmood Mahyideen, Education Office of Kelantan's Report 206 of the year 1938 (E.O.K. 206/1938)

=== Educational Reforms and Volunteer Work ===
Tengku Mahmood Mahyideen also introduced a course named Normal Class in Kelantan to improve the quality of teachers which were held every Saturday and mentored by graduates of the Sultan Idris Training College, this program aimed to provide pedagogical training to untrained local teachers.

Beyond education, he actively participated in volunteer work. He was appointed Scout Commissioner for Kelantan and in 1934, led the Kelantan Scout contingent to the World Scout Jamboree in Melbourne, Australia. In 1938, he was formally appointed as the State Education Officer of Kelantan.

=== Co-operative schools ===
As Superintendent of Education in Kelantan, he applied his entrepreneurial outlook to social development. He became a patron of school cooperatives, encouraging both teachers and students to support cooperative shops in order to strengthen local micro-economies. With assistance from his company, a number of school cooperatives in Kelantan were able to provide teachers with small loans, reducing their reliance on moneylenders.

== Military service ==
=== Kelantan Volunteer Force ===
In 1939, Kelantan established the Kelantan Volunteer Force (KVF) as part of the Unfederated Malay States Volunteer Forces. Tengku Mahmood Mahyiddeen enlisted that same year with the rank of Sergeant, later serving as Company Quartermaster Sergeant. The KVF mainly comprised teachers and government officials who volunteered for part-time military service.

=== Malayan Security Service, espionage in Thailand and Franco–Thai War ===
Shortly after enlisting in the Kelantan Volunteer Force (KVF) in 1939, Tengku Mahmood Mahyiddeen was recruited by the Malayan Security Service (MSS), the intelligence branch of the British colonial administration in Malaya, to monitor Japanese activities in neighbouring Thailand. His assignment focused on gathering intelligence regarding Japanese contacts with the Thai government and the movement of Japanese forces in the region.

Following the Siamese revolution of 1932, the country was officially renamed Thailand on 23 June 1939. Until 1941, Tengku Mahmood continued to operate as a covert agent, transmitting intelligence reports to the British. Tensions escalated during the Franco–Thai War of January 1941, when Japan intervened on Thailand's behalf against French Indochina. His intelligence reports provided the British with conclusive evidence of Thai–Japanese collaboration.

Copies of Tengku Mahmood's correspondence with the Malayan Security Service are preserved at Rhodes House, University of Oxford, within the Political Intelligence Journal files of the Service.

=== Battle of Kota Bharu ===
With the outbreak of the Second World War, the KVF was mobilised to defend Kelantan against advancing Japanese forces. Sergeant Tengku Mahmood was attached to the 8th Indian Infantry Brigade of the 9th Indian Infantry Division, headquartered in Kota Bharu.

During the Battle of Kota Bharu in December 1941 and the subsequent Japanese advance inland, the KVF, being a volunteer formation, was officially disbanded in January 1942. Nevertheless, Tengku Mahmood and several former KVF members resolved to continue resisting the occupation. Together with British troops, they established a defensive line along the Nal River (Malay: Sungai Nal) near Kuala Krai, operating alongside a company from the 4th Battalion, Royal Malay Regiment, which had previously been stationed at Dabong in Ulu Kelantan.

The collapse of the defensive line compelled a withdrawal southwards. Tengku Mahmood retreated with British forces as far as Kuala Lipis, Pahang. The 8th Indian Infantry Brigade subsequently received orders to fall back to Singapore, where it was assigned to the fortification of the island's defences.

=== Battle of Singapore and the SS Kuala Tragedy ===
Prior to the arrival of the 8th Indian Infantry Brigade in Singapore, the 22nd Indian Infantry Brigade was destroyed during engagements with Japanese forces. As the 22nd Brigade had formed part of the 11th Indian Infantry Division, the 8th Brigade was subsequently reassigned from the 9th Indian Infantry Division to the 11th and placed under its command for the defence of Singapore.

Upon reaching Singapore, the 8th Brigade was stationed at the Raden Mas English School in Pasir Panjang. Tengku Mahmood Mahyiddeen, however, was detached to Geylang Serai, where he was temporarily assigned to Radio Singapura (present-day Mediacorp), serving within its Malay Division. Before his posting, he entrusted his personal effects, including a pistol and medical supplies, to a fellow former KVF member who had retreated with him from Kota Bharu. After a brief period of service in Singapore, Tengku Mahmood and other volunteers received orders to evacuate to India.

On the evening of 13 February 1942, he embarked on the SS Kuala, an ageing coastal vessel used in the evacuation of civilians and military personnel. Among the estimated 700 to 750 passengers were European, Eurasian, and Chinese civilians, in addition to British troops. Contemporary accounts, including Geoffrey Brooke's Singapore's Dunkirk (1990), describe the ship as heavily overcrowded, with a significant proportion of women and children. The passenger list also included prominent figures such as senior colonial administrators, businessmen, and members of the local aristocracy, many of whom had delayed departure under the belief that Singapore would not fall.

==== The sinking of the SS Kuala ====
On 14 February 1942, the SS Kuala was attacked by Japanese aircraft off Pom Pong Island (present-day Penyengat Island, near the Riau Archipelago) while en route from Singapore to Padang. The vessel was heavily bombed, resulting in the deaths of an estimated 135 people. Survivors abandoned ship, many swimming to the island to escape the bombardment.

Among the survivors were more than 130 female nurses from military and government hospitals, around 20 Royal Air Force female radar technicians, eight employees of the Straits Trading Company, approximately 68 men from the Public Works Department and volunteer units, and numerous civilians. Tengku Mahmood Mahyiddeen was among the group of 68 men who were reported to have played a crucial role in maintaining order among the stranded survivors and in digging wells to provide fresh water. The area in which they established their wells later became known as Spring Cove.

Initial assistance came from local residents of neighbouring islands, who transported a limited number of survivors by tongkang to nearby fishing villages. On 16 February 1942, the small transport vessel SS Tanjong Pinang evacuated about 200 survivors from Pom Pong Island. However, on the following day, the ship was sunk by Japanese aircraft en route to Batavia (present-day Jakarta), with the loss of all passengers.

Further rescue efforts reached Pom Pong Island on 18 February 1942, involving the MV Krait (a former Japanese fishing vessel), the Hung Jao (a Chinese junk), HMS Numbing (a Royal Navy harbour defence motor launch), HMS Plover (a Royal Navy steam gun boat class), and the Heather (a split hopper barge). On 20 February, the Krait returned for a second evacuation, taking more survivors to safety. The precise vessel on which Tengku Mahmood left Pom Pong Island remains uncertain, though records confirm that he was among those who ultimately reached Batavia.

=== All India Radio and Suara Harimau Malaya ===
After arriving in British Raj (British India) from the Dutch East Indies, Tengku Mahmood Mahyiddeen was seconded to the Malay Division of All India Radio (Malay: All India Radio, Bahagian Melayu, abbreviated as AIRBM) owing to his prior experience at Radio Singapura. He was appointed as Coordinator and Manager, where he produced and presented a Malay-language broadcast titled Suara Harimau Malaya ("Voice of the Malayan Tiger").

Broadcasts were delivered under the pseudonym Raja Mopeng and the broadcast title, Harimau Malaya, which later became his operational alias while serving with the Special Operations Executive (SOE). The programme, operated under the authority of the British Ministry of Information, transmitted patriotic messages from India to occupied Malaya. Each broadcast opened with military marching music, most notably the "Colonel Bogey March", a piece which Mahyiddeen had favoured since his time with the Penang Free School Cadet Corps Band.

=== Force 136 and the Malay Section ===
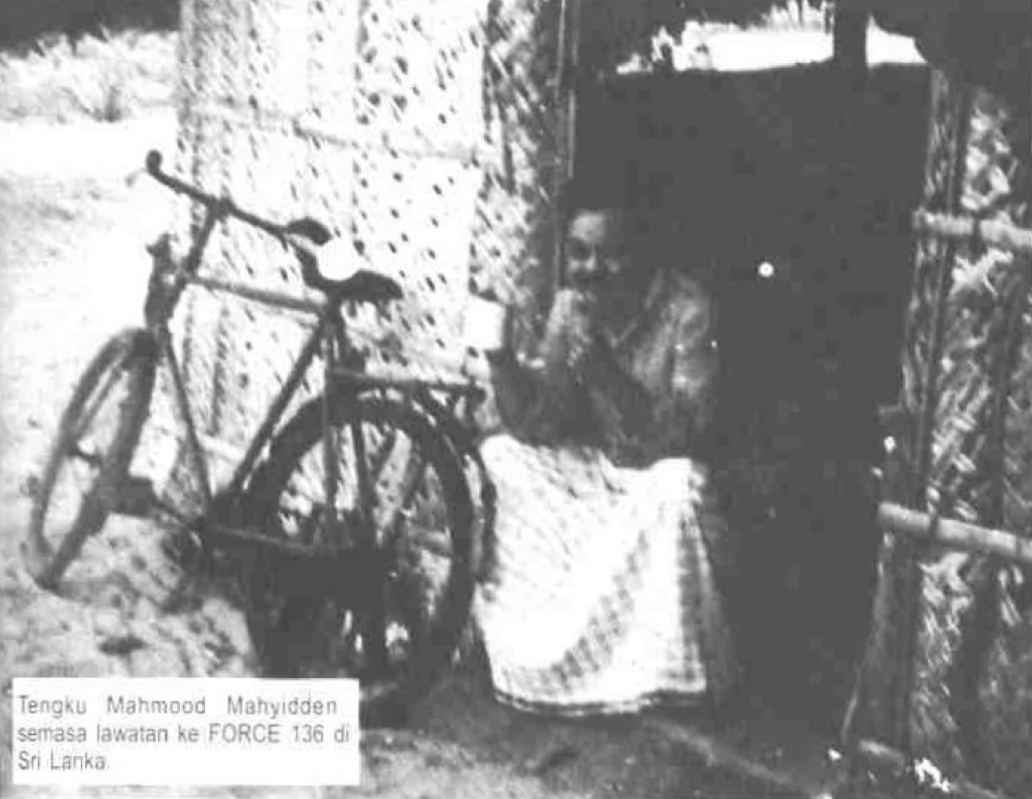
Tengku Mahmood Mahyideen in Ceylon during Force 136's missions

In the latter half of 1942, after nearly a year with the Malay Division of All India Radio (AIRBM), Tengku Mahmood Mahyiddeen resigned in order to join Force 136, the Far Eastern branch of the Special Operations Executive (SOE). Drawing on his prior experience in covert operations in Thailand, he sought to contribute directly to the Allied war effort against Japan.

At the time, British authorities were initially reluctant to recruit Malays into Force 136. Recruitment policy had largely prioritised Chinese volunteers, as they were perceived as more reliable allies due to their hostility towards Japan following the outbreak of the Second Sino–Japanese War in 1937. Malays, by contrast, were viewed with caution, as the Japanese occupation had treated them comparatively less harshly than the Chinese population.

Tengku Mahmood used his aristocratic standing and wartime connections to persuade British officials that the Malays had also suffered under Japanese rule and could be mobilised as dependable allies. His arguments reached the Supreme Allied Commander South East Asia, Admiral Lord Louis Mountbatten, who subsequently authorised the enlistment of Malays into Force 136. Tengku Mahmood was commissioned as a Major in the British Indian Army, with his appointment personally confirmed by Mountbatten.

This appointment was regarded as a significant honour, both for Tengku Mahmood himself and for the Malay community, as it represented formal recognition of Malay participation in the Allied resistance during the war.

"...by this time, British Intelligence had got around to enlisting Tengku Mahmood Mahyideen as a staff officer to advise on planning and organising the work to be done by the Malays in the eventual re-taking of Malaya."

— General Ibrahim Ismail, Have You Met Mariam?

==== Malay Section of Force 136 ====
Major Tengku Mahmood was tasked with creating and managing the Malay Section of Force 136. Recruitment efforts focused on Malay students abroad, particularly in British Raj (British India), Egypt, Iraq, Jordan, Palestine, Saudi Arabia, and the United Kingdom. Funded by the British, he travelled extensively to persuade students to join the unit. In India, he advertised through local newspapers and convened meetings, eventually assembling about 30 volunteers at a bungalow in New Delhi known as Malaya Lodge. There, he conducted briefings and discussions to outline the mission of the Malay Section, resulting in unanimous agreement among attendees to enlist.

In September 1942, he held a special meeting in New Delhi with Ibrahim Ismail (later General Tan Sri Ibrahim Ismail), then an officer cadet of the Johor Military Forces undergoing training at the Indian Military Academy, Dehra Dun. Tengku Mahmood successfully persuaded him to join the Malay Section of Force 136.

Although numbering fewer than fifty, the Malay Section underwent commando training under British instructors, with emphasis on small-arms proficiency, jungle warfare, espionage, sabotage, and survival techniques. Major Tengku Mahmood also served as the spymaster for Force 136 operations in Malaya, overseeing intelligence networks and coordinating infiltration plans.

"All Malayan matters, especially on the names of possible Malay contacts to be made in the country were handled by the organisation's chief adviser, Tengku Mahmood Mahyideen himself..."

— Aziz Mahmood, Tengku Mahmood Mahyideen (1908-1954): Peranan, Sumbangan dan perjuangan

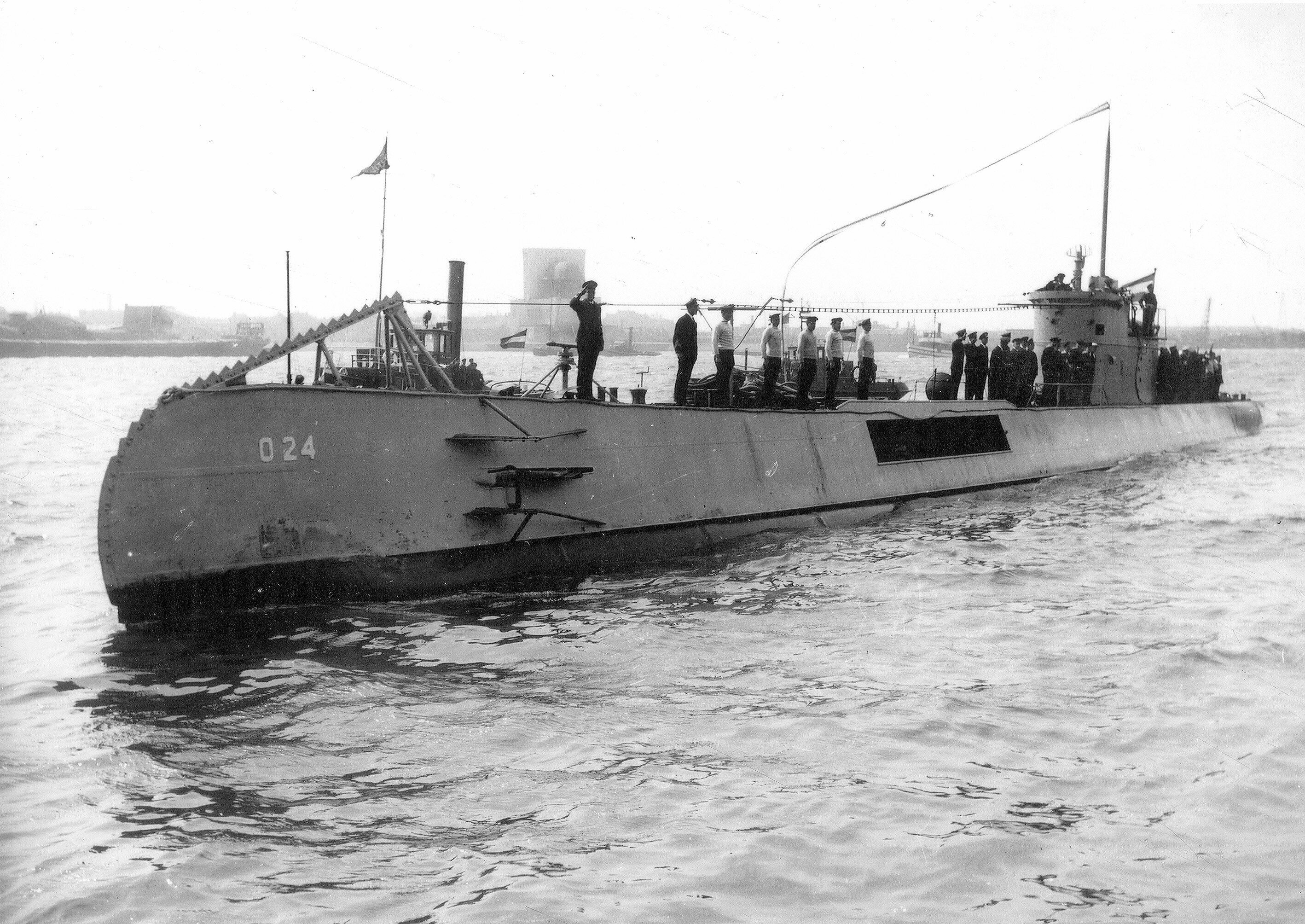
The Dutch submarine HNLMS O 24 transported members of Force 136 during Operation Gustavus from Sri Lanka to Malaya.

As spymaster, Tengku Mahmood was responsible for supervising covert sea and air deployments into Malaya. Submarine missions, codenamed Gustavus I to VII, and air operations, such as Operation Beacon, Operation Fighter, Operation Hebrides, and Operation Oatmeal, fell under his authority. While he himself did not participate directly in guerrilla combat, his role in planning, intelligence, and coordination was considered central to the effectiveness of Force 136 in Malaya.

Tengku Mahmood believed that Britain would ultimately retake Malaya and that Malay participation in the resistance would secure political recognition after the war. He urged Malays abroad to unite in supporting the Allies, alongside existing anti-Japanese groups such as the Malayan People's Anti-Japanese Army (MPAJA) and the Malayan Communist Party (MCP).

Major Tengku Mahmood returned to Malaya in October 1945, following the re-establishment of the British Military Administration. Shortly thereafter, Force 136 was formally disbanded. The Malay members, after two years of service, quietly returned to their villages. Though their efforts received little public recognition, they had played a role in undermining Japanese authority during the occupation. Tengku Mahmood's contribution as the 'mastermind' and spymaster of the Malay Section was regarded as critical to the planning and execution of clandestine operations in Malaya.

== Struggle for independence and icon of the independence movement ==
During his lifetime, Tengku Mahmood was regarded as one of the icons of the independence movement in Malaya. In addition to his resistance against the Japanese during the Second World War, he was also deeply involved in the independence struggle, first for his birthplace Patani in southern Thailand and later for Malaya. His efforts combined diplomacy, propaganda, and armed resistance.

=== First attempt: diplomacy for Patani's independence ===
After the end of the Second World War, Tengku Mahmood returned to Malaya from Force 136 Headquarters in Sri Lanka. He immediately began campaigning for the liberation of Patani, Yala (then known as Jala), and Narathiwat (then known as Naradhivas) from Thai rule. Using his wartime connections, he sought British support. On 1 November 1945, as part of preparations for a peace treaty between the United Kingdom and Thailand, a proposal was draughted which included demands for the independence of the Malay states in southern Thailand. The document was signed by eight Malay aristocrats, although Tengku Mahmood was not among them, as he was still serving as an officer in the British military.

Many Malays in southern Thailand were preparing to launch an armed rebellion at the time, but Tengku Mahmood persuaded them to first attempt diplomacy. (Note: Since the 1923 Belukar Semak rebellion, Malays and Muslims in Thailand have been regarded as second-class Thai citizens. They were not permitted to pursue any administrative or governmental positions. The positions in administration and government were only available to Buddhists, leading several Muslims to convert to Buddhism. This resulted in several conflicts, which continue to this day. See South Thailand insurgency) However, when the Anglo-Thai Peace Treaty was formally signed on 1 January 1946, the independence demand was omitted. Britain, under pressure from the United States, declined to support the Malay cause. (Note: See Thailand–United States relations) This outcome left Tengku Mahmood disillusioned with both the British and Thai governments, which he viewed as having betrayed the southern Thai Malays.

=== Second attempt: propaganda and armed struggle ===
Drawing on his wartime training in propaganda, Tengku Mahmood launched a press campaign against the Thai government. He published critical articles in Malay and English newspapers in Singapore, Kuala Lumpur, and Penang, which soon gained international attention. The Thai government appealed to British authorities to silence him, but the British Chargé d'Affaires in Bangkok refused, citing press freedom in British-controlled territories. His propaganda efforts won wide support among the Malays of southern Thailand.

By mid-1947, according to Malayan Security Service reports, several prominent Patani nobles proclaimed him as the Raja of Patani. By March 1948, he had raised considerable funds to purchase firearms and wireless equipment, which he distributed across Narathiwat, Pattani, Sai Buri, Satun, and Yala for guerrilla operations. Security Service records noted at least 85 rifles and 500 rounds of ammunition distributed in Kampung Kekala, Pattani, though the total number of weapons supplied is unknown.

Through the Greater Patani Malay Association (Malay: Gabongan Melayu Pattani Raya, abbreviated as GAMPAR), and capitalising on the instability caused by the 1948 Thai coup d'état, Tengku Mahmood managed to unsettle the Thai government. In response, the authorities dispatched Seni Pramoj, then Minister of Education, to negotiate with him and offer him a senior post in the government. However, this move angered members of GAMPAR, who suspected him of betrayal. Although Tengku Mahmood rejected the Thai government's offer, his relationship with GAMPAR deteriorated. Disillusioned, he withdrew from the Patani independence movement and shifted his focus towards Malaya.

=== Role in Malaya's independence movement ===
Tengku Mahmood was among the first Malay nobles to openly oppose the Malayan Union. Being literate in English, he was able to study the proposal draughted by Sir Harold MacMichael, who in 1945–46 had pressured Malay rulers into signing the scheme. Many of the monarchs, not fully conversant in English, had been misled into signing documents that differed from MacMichael's verbal assurances.

In 1946, Tengku Mahmood joined the newly formed United Malays National Organisation (UMNO), working with other Malay leaders to resist the Malayan Union and pave the way for independence. Although he did not live to witness the realisation of their efforts on 31 August 1957, having died in 1953, his role is remembered as laying important foundations for Malaya's independence struggle.

== Political Activism ==
According to Hugh Wilson, a Southeast Asian historian at the University of Alberta, in his 1992 article "Tengku Mahmud Mahyiddeen and the Dilemma of Partisan Duality", Tengku Mahmood was regarded as a supporter of both left- and right-wing political movements. In the aftermath of the Second World War, he initially leaned towards right-wing nationalism. However, in 1947 he was reported to have attended a communist convention in Java, Indonesia, where he met prominent leaders such as Sukarno and Dr Roeslan Abdulgani.

By 1948, Tengku Mahmood shifted back towards nationalism, although he continued to maintain cordial relations with communist circles. His political activism during this period reflected his pragmatic approach, moving between different ideological groups while maintaining the ultimate goal of achieving independence for Patani and Malaya.

The following are examples of his political activities:

=== Involvement in the Malay Nationalist Party of Malaya ===
In 1945, after the end of World War II, Tengku Mahmood Mahyideen decided to join the Parti Kebangsaan Melayu Malaya (PKMM). PKMM was a political party advocating for full independence for Malaya without British interference. The party demanded that Malays assume governance of the country and opposed any lingering colonial influence.

Tengku Mahmood Mahyideen recognised that Malaya needed more than negotiations with the British full independence was his ultimate goal. He supported PKMM for its uncompromising stance on liberation, contrasting with the more moderate approach of UMNO (United Malays National Organisation) at the time. As an influential figure, he became a moral and strategic advocate for Malay freedom.

=== Federal Legislative Council of Malaya ===
Tengku Mahmood Mahyideen was appointed as a member of the Federal Legislative Council of Malaya, a body pivotal in debating British colonial policies. On 10 November 1947, he raised concerns about economic disparities between ethnic groups, blaming the colonial government for failing to provide equitable opportunities for Malays in education and public administration. He called for more inclusive economic policies and emphasized investing in Malay education as the foundation of national development.

=== Greater Patani Malay Association (GAMPAR) ===
Apart from his role in the Malay Nationalist Party of Malaya (PKMM), Tengku Mahmood Mahyiddeen was also active in the Greater Patani Malay Association (Malay: Gabongan Melayu Pattani Raya, abbreviated as GAMPAR, also known as GEMPAR), an organisation advocating for the independence and unification of Malay territories under Siamese rule. GAMPAR claimed the southern provinces of Pattani, Narathiwat, and Yala as part of Malaya, with the movement's ultimate objective being their integration into a free and united Malaya.

In 1947, during his involvement with GAMPAR, Tengku Mahmood travelled to Java, Indonesia, where he met President Sukarno. The discussions centred on the importance of solidarity between Malay nations and Indonesia in their shared anti-colonial struggle. During the meeting, Sukarno reportedly promised to provide material support for a separatist guerrilla movement led by Tengku Mahmood to fight for the independence of southern Thailand. However, Sukarno's condition was that, once liberated, the territories would join the Republic of Indonesia as one of its provinces. Tengku Mahmood rejected this proposal, as he preferred the southern Thai provinces to be incorporated into Malaya rather than Indonesia.

=== UMNO and the Malayan Union ===
Tengku Mahmood Mahyideen played a significant role in Malaya's early political history through his participation in UMNO, though his involvement was often balanced by his reputation as an outspoken independent figure. He first engaged with UMNO when the party became the primary Malay platform opposing the Malayan Union a British administrative system introduced in 1946 that weakened the authority of Malay Rulers and granted liberal citizenship to non-Malays.

He was among the first Malay nobles to openly reject the Malayan Union, arguing that it blatantly undermined the sovereignty of Malay Rulers and threatened the status of Malays as the indigenous people. In a statement published by The Straits Times, he described the Malayan Union as a policy that "destroys the traditional social and political fabric of the Malays" and urged all parties to unite against it.

By 1950, Tengku Mahmood Mahyideen was touted as a potential successor to Dato' Onn Ja'afar as UMNO President after Dato' Onn's proposal to open party membership to non-Malays sparked internal dissent. According to The Singapore Standard and The Straits Times (6 August 1950), several UMNO branches, including those in Perak, supported Tengku Mahmood Mahyideen as a leader capable of upholding Malay nationalist principles within UMNO.

== Renunciation of Royal title ==
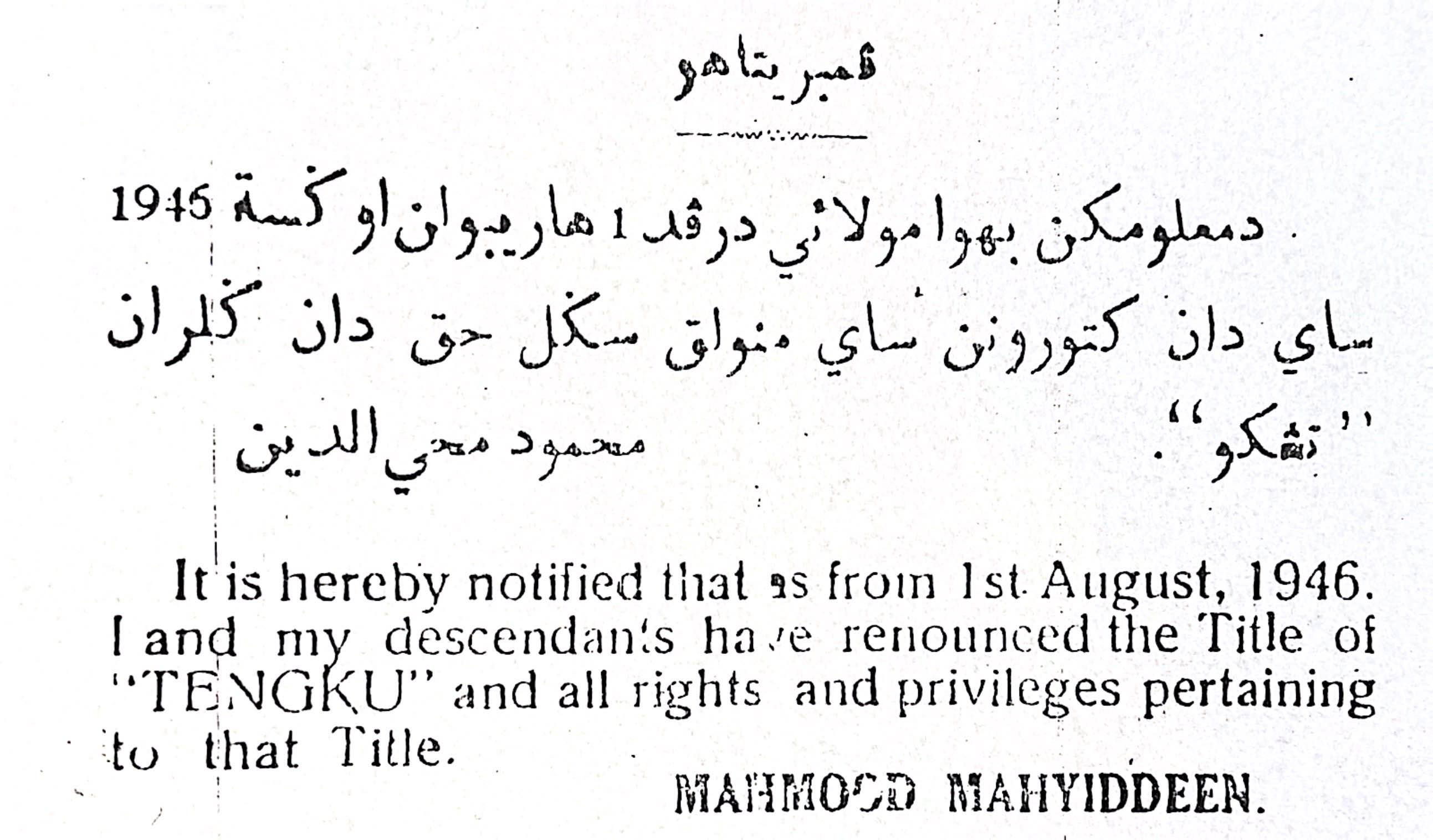
The public declaration of the renunciation of the royal title 'Tengku' for himself and his descendants in local newspapers.

Tengku Mahmood Mahyideen publicly renounced the title 'Tengku' (Prince) for himself and his descendants through a local newspaper on 25 September 1946. He did not state the reason behind this decision. However, several sources associate it with his disappointment over broken British promises to liberate Patani. (Note: According to some sources, the British promised Tengku Mahmood Mahyideen that if he assisted them through Force 136, they would reinstate Patani as a Malay state.) Some sources also suggest that he was disillusioned by the formation of the Malayan Union. Following this, Tengku Mahmood Mahyideen was referred to in newspapers simply as 'Inche' or 'Che'.

== Death ==
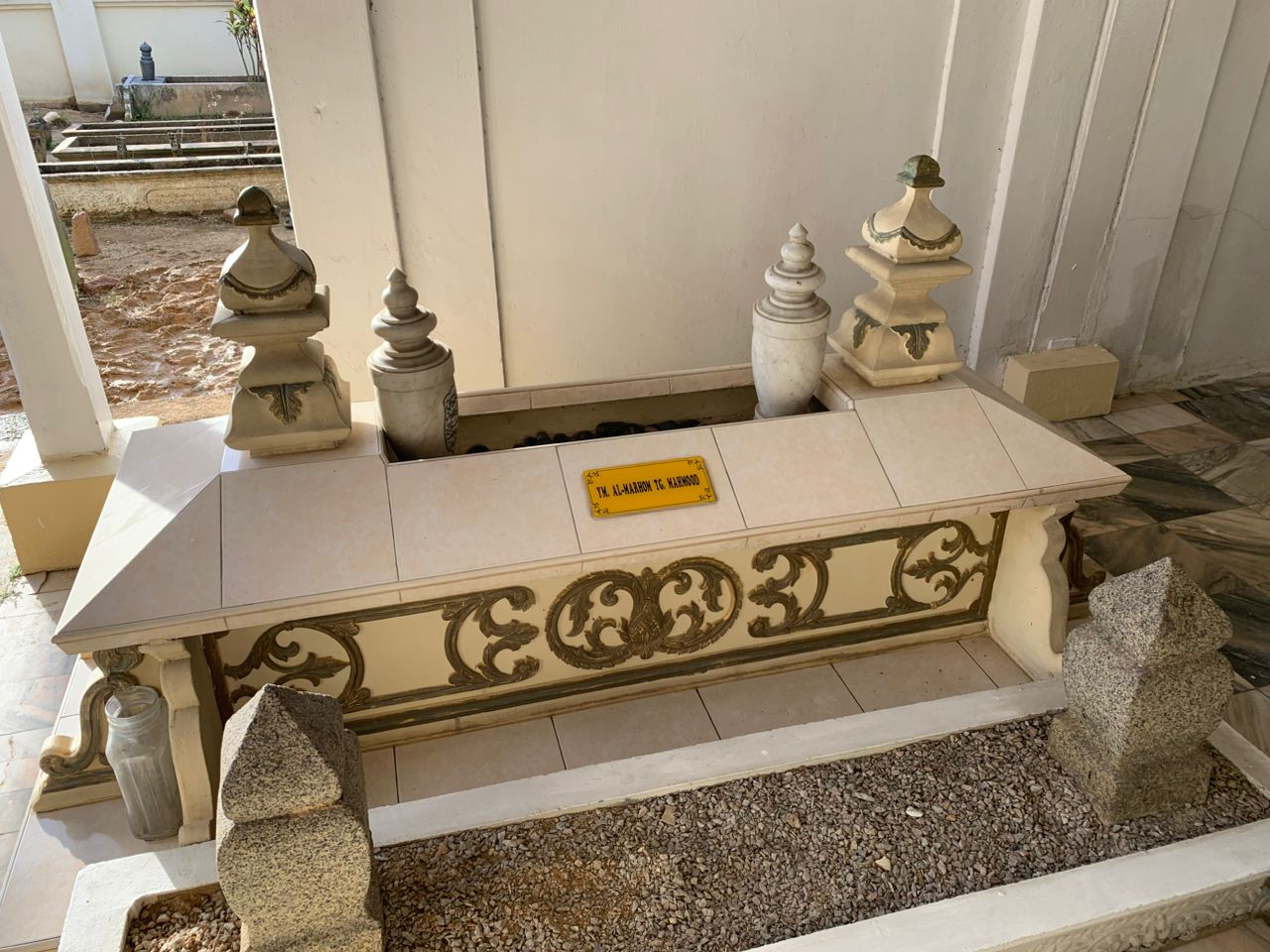
Tomb of Tengku Mahmood Mahyideen at the Kelantan Royal Mausoleum.

Tengku Mahmood Mahyideen died on 12 February 1954 at the age of 45 in Kota Bharu after performing the obligatory Friday prayer. His death occurred suddenly, and no official cause of death was disclosed to the public. Although there was curiosity among the community, no reliable sources indicated any criminal elements or poisoning involved. His death was mourned by many, reflecting his profound influence as an educator, social reformer and war hero in Malaya.

For the people of Malaya, Tengku Mahmood Mahyideen's death was regarded as a significant loss in the context of the independence struggle. Before he could fully dedicate his service to religion, community, and nation, he died. Despite his royal lineage, Tengku Mahmood Mahyideen was known as a leader who remained close to the people and fought tirelessly for their interests. His role as a pivotal figure in society ensured that his passing was deeply felt by many. More than 500 people headed by the Sultan of Kelantan followed his bier to the Royal Mausoleum at Jalan Langgar.

== Honours and awards ==
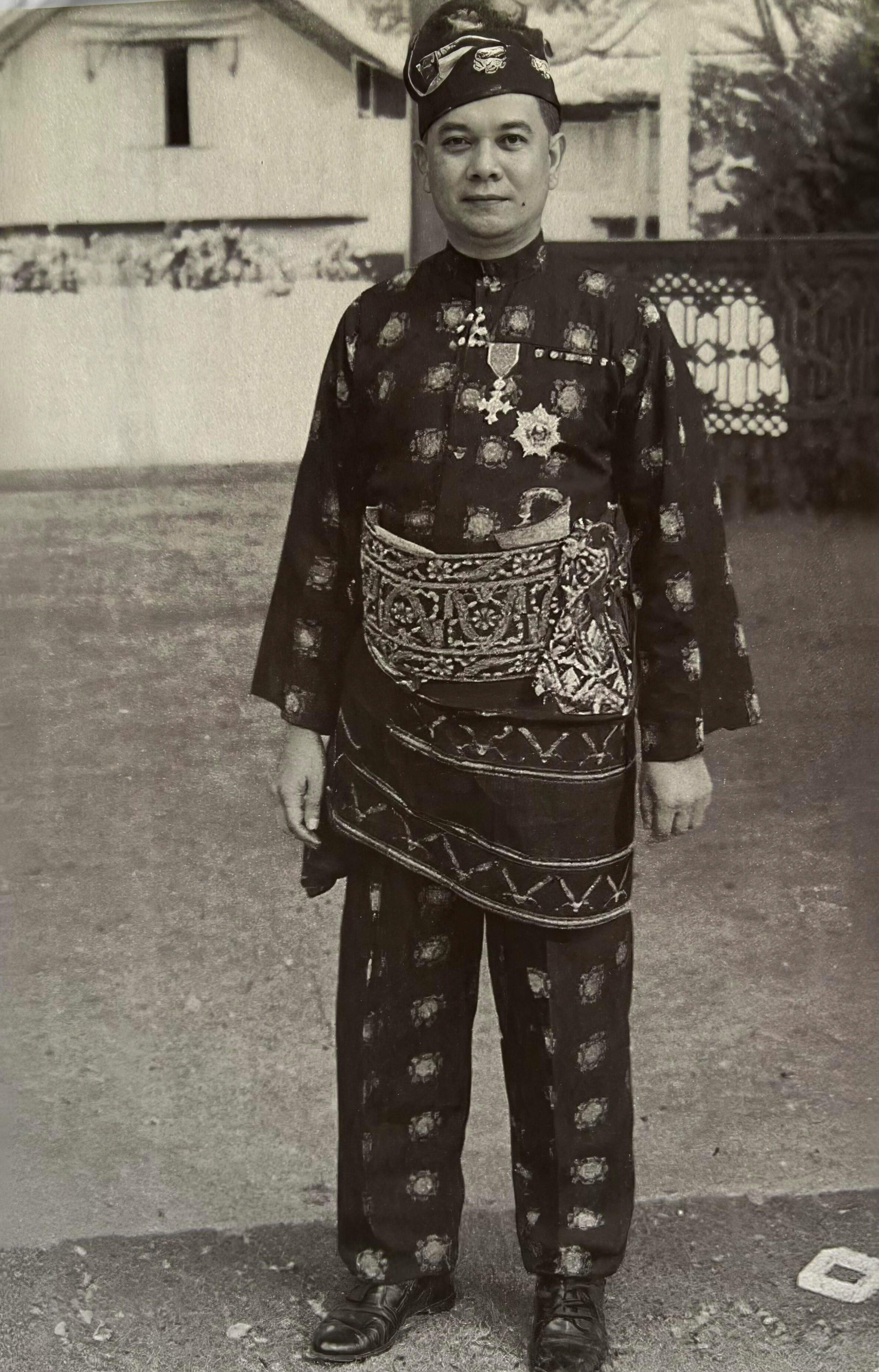
Tengku Mahmood Mahyideen wearing traditional Baju Melayu, adorned with the MBE and DPMK medals.

=== Malaysian Honours ===
- Kelantan
  - Knight Commander of the Order of the Crown of Kelantan (DPMK) – Dato' (1939)
  - Recipient of the Crown of Kelantan Decoration (SMK) (1938)

=== Foreign Honours ===
- United Kingdom
  - Member of the Order of the British Empire (MBE) (1946)

=== Military Honours ===
- United Kingdom
  - 1939-45 Star (1945)
  - Pacific Star with Burma Rosette (1945)
  - Defence Medal (1945)
  - War Medal 1939-1945 (1945)
