= Mansur of Kelantan =

Sultan of Kelantan state in Malaysia

- Sultan of Kelantan

Sultan of Kelantan
- Reign: 12 May 1891 - 1899
- Coronation: 1892
- Predecessor: Sultan Muhammad III
- Successor: Sultan Muhammad IV
- Born: Long Kundor bin Long Ahmad Tengah; 1800
- Died: 10 February 1900 (aged 99–100)
- Burial: 1900; Kelantan Royal Mausoleum
Regnal name
- Sultan Mansur II
- House: House of Long Yunus
- Father: Long Ahmad
- Religion: Islam

Mansur of Kelantan was the Sultan of Kelantan state in Malaysia. His real name was Long Mansor, the son of Long Ahmad and the younger brother of Long Kundor. He ascended the throne in 1891 and ruled until 1899.

Among the influential state dignitaries during his reign were:

- Datuk Maha Menteri Saad bin Ngah (Che Ha')
- Datuk Sri Paduka Nik Yusof bin Nik Abdul Majid (Nik Soh bin Nik Jid)
- Tok Hakim Kelantan, Syed Muhammad bin Syed Alwi

These dignitaries, with the support of their followers, were very influential in determining the heir to the throne. This situation caused dissatisfaction among the royal family who were not selected to ascend the throne and did not receive any positions in the government.

During his reign, in 1891, Dato' Bahaman fled to Gua Musang (Ulu Kelantan). Kelantan Islamic and customs law also were noted to be at their best during his reign.

He died on 10 February 1900 and is buried at Kelantan Royal Mausoleum.

== See also ==
- Sultan Kelantan
