= 1967 Pasir Mas Hulu by-election =

- 19 August 1967

P021 seat in Dewan Rakyat
- Turnout: 71.62%
	First party	Second party
	PMIP	All
Candidate	Tengku Zaid Tengku Ahmad	Hussein Ahmad
Party	PMIP	UMNO
Alliance		Alliance
Popular vote	9,733	6,931
Percentage	58.41	41.59
MP before election
Abdul Samad Gul Ahmad Mianji
PMIP
Elected MP
Tengku Zaid Tengku Ahmad
PMIP

The Pasir Mas Hulu by-election was a parliamentary by-election that was held on 19 August 1967 in the state of Kelantan, Malaysia. The Pasir Mas Hulu seat fell vacant following its PMIP MP Abdul Samad Gul Ahmad Mianji being axed to death on 3 July 1967. He won the seat in 1964 Malaysian general election with a majority of 4,361 votes.

Tengku Zaid Tengku Ahmad of PMIP, retained the seat, defeating Hussein Ahmad of Alliance with a reduced majority of 2,802 votes.

== Nomination ==
Initially, UMNO indicate the party may not contest the by-election due to the unpleasant and tragic death of the incumbent.

On nomination day, two candidates were confirmed. Alliance renominated their candidate during 1964 Malaysian general election, secretary and Youth leader of UMNO Pasir Mas, Hussein Ahmad. PMIP nominated former Major of the Royal Malay Regiment, ms:Tengku Zaid Tengku Ahmad.

== Campaign ==
Throughout the campaign, Alliance accused PMIP of using Sultan of Kelantan name during campaigning. PMIP denied the accusation eventhough their candidate is a member of Kelantan royal family.

== Results ==
Malaysian general by-election, 19 August 1967: Pasir Mas Hulu Upon the death of incumbent, Abdul Samad Gul Ahmad Mianji
Party	Candidate	Votes	%	∆%
PMIP	Tengku Zaid Tengku Ahmad	9,733	58.41	▼5.79
Alliance	Hussein Ahmad	6,931	41.59	▲5.79
Total valid votes		16,664	100.00	
Total rejected ballots		252		
Unreturned ballots		0		
Turnout		16,916	71.62	▼5.60
Registered electors		23,618		
Majority		2,802	16.82	▼11.58
PMIP hold		Swing		
