= Muhammad II of Kelantan =

Sultan of Kelantan state in Malaysia

- Sultan of Kelantan
- Reign: 1836 - 1886
- Coronation: 1836
- Predecessor: Sultan Long Zainal Abidin
- Successor: Sultan Ahmad Tengah
- Born: Long Senik ibni Tengku Temenggong Long Tan; 1794
- Died: 30 October 1886 (aged 91–92)
- Burial: 1886; Kelantan Royal Mausoleum
- Spouse: Sultanah To binti Tengku Long Yusuf; Raja Perempuan Gunung Engku Putri Neng binti Engku Long Sri; Nik Embong; Raja Perempuan II Ku Senik Tendong
Regnal name
- Muhammad II
- House: House of Long Yunus
- Father: Tengku Temenggong Aria Pahlawan Tengku Long Tan
- Religion: Islam

Sultan Muhamad II ibni al-Marhum Tengku Temenggong Long Tan (jawi: سلطان محمد ٢ ابن سلطان محمد ١; c.1793- 30 October 1886) was the Sultan of Kelantan from 1836 to 1886.

== Succession ==
Muhammad II ascended the throne after a violent succession struggle. Early in his reign Kelantan was torn by a civil war among rival princes.

In 1838 the British envoy Munshi Abdullah was recorded to deliver Governor Samuel George Bonham's letters to Kelantanese chiefs including the Sultan and other leading rajas to relieve boats containing valuable merchandise owned by Singaporean merchants, the letter confirmed that the boats were stranded due to an ongoing civil war there. The civil war drew Siamese intervention and in 1839 King Rama III's envoy Phraya Siphiphat who mediated peace between Sultan Muhammad II and his rival Tuan Besar, eventually relocating Tuan Besar to govern Pattani in 1842. Siam thereafter formally recognized Long Senik as ruler (conferring on him the noble title Phaya Wiset Baktiya in 1836) and in later years elevated his rank under King Rama V.

== Reign ==
During Sultan Muhammad II's reign Kelantan's capital was moved to the new town of Kota Bharu. In 1840 he built the wooden Grand Hall Palace (Istana Balai Besar) on the east bank of the Kelantan River; with its completion the settlement was renamed Kota Bharu (“New Fort”) and became the state's administrative center. The old riverside palace (Istana Kota Lama) had frequently flooded, so the relocation marked a decisive reorientation of Kelantan's government. Sultan Muhammad II also promoted Islam and Malay culture. He founded the Muhammadi Mosque in Kota Bharu. The original timber mosque was built in 1867 during his rule (later rebuilt in brick in 1922–1931). He is credited with erecting other royal structures and supporting education and trade, helping to stabilize Kelantan under his dynasty.
