= Abdul Kadir of Patani =

Tengku Abdul Kadir Kamaruddin
- Phraya Wichitphakdi
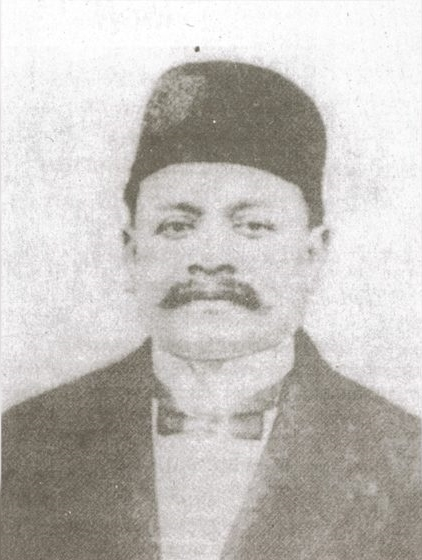
- Tengku Abdul Kadir Kamaruddin

Sultan of Patani
- Reign: 1899-1902
- Predecessor: Sultan Sulaiman Sharafuddin Syah
- Successor: Monarchy abolished
- Born: Tengku Abdul Kadir Kamaruddin Syah Ibni Sultan Sulaiman Sharafuddin Syah c. 1874; Patani Kingdom
- Died: 19 March 1933 (aged 59); Kota Bharu, Kelantan
- Burial: Langgar Royal Mausoleum, Kota Bharu, Kelantan
- House: House of Long Yunus
- Religion: Sunni Islam

Tengku Abdul Kadir Kamaruddin Syah (c. 1874 – 19 May 1933) was the last ruling Sultan of the Patani Kingdom, a Malay sultanate in what is now southern Thailand. He reigned from 1899 until 1902, when Siam (Thailand) formally deposed him and abolished the Patani monarchy. After his deposition, Abdul Kadir lived much of his life in exile but remained a symbol of Malay resistance to Siamese rule.

== Early life and succession ==
Abdul Kadir was born into the Kelantanese royal family that ruled the Patani Kingdom. He was a son of Sultan Sulaiman Sharafuddin Syah, the 10th Raja of Patani. When Sultan Sulaiman died around 1898, the local Malay nobility (the chiefs of Patani) convened and unanimously selected Abdul Kadir as the new Raja. The Siamese king Chulalongkorn accepted this choice: after a one-year probation, he formally confirmed Abdul Kadir as Raja Patani (granting a royal commission and the traditional drum of sovereignty). In Siam's records Abdul Kadir was known by a Thai title (Phraya Wichitphakdi Si Surawongsa Ratna Khet Prasertrat) and counted as Phraya Pattani V, 11th and final ruler of the Patani sultanate.

== Reign (1899-1902) ==
During his brief reign, Abdul Kadir sought to preserve Patani's autonomy under the suzerainty of Siam. He inherited a state under growing Siamese administration: the Siamese had recently begun to appoint Thai commissioners and restructure local governance. Early in his reign Abdul Kadir protested Siamese interference – for example, he reportedly wrote to the British High Commissioner in Singapore (in 1898) complaining that Siam's new policies “is leading to the destruction of my country”. He also pressured Siam through local Malay councils and even planned a local uprising in late 1901 with other Malay rulers (hoping that French intervention might force Siam's hand). However, British officials in nearby Malaya dissuaded him from open rebellion. Throughout 1901–1902, Abdul Kadir and Siamese officials negotiated over Patani's status.

In February 1902 Siam's Deputy Interior Minister (Phraya Sri Sahathep) arrived in Patani with a large force to finalize these negotiations. On 21 February 1902 he presented Abdul Kadir with the new “Seven Provinces Administrative Act” (later known as the Monthon Patani reforms) and demanded Abdul Kadir's seal. Abdul Kadir refused to sign away Patani's autonomy, and as a result he was immediately dismissed by the Siamese government. He was stripped of his royal title and power, arrested, and sent into exile (initially to Songkhla, then Phitsanulok) . The Patani sultanate was divided and reorganized as three Siamese provinces (Pattani, Yala, Narathiwat) under direct Siamese rule, marking the end of independent Patani monarchy.

== Exile and later activism ==
After his removal, Abdul Kadir remained a focal point for Malay nationalists and religious leaders in the region. He was charged with sedition (Patani seditious correspondence) around 1903, though by some accounts he was later pardoned (around 1906) on the condition that he ceases political activities. In 1915 Abdul Kadir left Patani, fleeing further conflicts with the Siamese, and took refuge in neighboring Kelantan, then a Malay sultanate under British protection.

From exile he continued to advocate for Patani's Malay Muslim community. He is said to have supported Pan-Islamist and Malay nationalist causes: for example, Patani rebellion leaders received support from Ottoman sympathizers including an Ottoman officer, Osman Effendi and organizations like the Pattani Islamic Defense Front (PMAI) were formed under his patronage in the 1920s. In practice, his direct influence waned, but he remained a symbolic leader. Local resistance movements in the 1920s (such as uprisings against compulsory Siamese schooling) drew inspiration from Abdul Kadir's earlier struggle. In summary, his later life was devoted to cultural and religious advocacy for Patani Malays, even after the kingdom itself was dissolved.

== Legacy ==
Abdul Kadir Kamaruddin is remembered as the last Malay Sultan of Patani, marking the end of over 300 years of Patani monarchy. His deposition in 1902 and the subsequent Siamese administrative reforms are seen as a turning point that fully integrated Patani into the Thai state. His dismissal and exile made him a rallying figure: later Patani activists (including the 20th-century leader Haji Sulong) often invoked his example.

Abdul Kadir's descendants also played notable roles. For example, one of his sons, Tengku Mahmood Mahyideen became a World War II resistance leader and founded the Greater Patani Malay Association (GAMPAR). His granddaughter Tengku Budriah married into the Perlis Royal Family.

Abdul Kadir died in exile in Kelantan on 19 May 1933. He was buried at the royal mausoleum in Langgar, Kota Bharu, Kelantan. His life and reign are the subject of historical study and regional memory, and he is often cited in discussions of Patani's Malay identity and its historical relationship with Siam/Thailand.
