= Laws of the Constitution of Kelantan =

Constitution of the state of Kelantan, Malaysia

- The coat of arms of Kelantan

Overview
- Original title: Undang-Undang Perlembagaan Tubuh Kerajaan Kelantan
- Jurisdiction: Kelantan, Malaysia
- Subordinate to: Federal Constitution of Malaysia
- Created: 1 February 1948 (First Part); 2 August 1956 (Second Part)
- System: Parliamentary democracy Constitutional monarchy

Government structure
- Branches: Two (Legislative and Executive)
- Head of state: Sultan of Kelantan
- Chambers: Unicameral
- Executive: State Executive Council

History
- Amendments: 40
- Last amended: 30 August 2012
- Signatories: First Part: In Romanised Malay: Yahya Petra of Kelantan; H Zainal; T Ahmed; TM Yusuff; NA Kamil; T Mahmood; In Jawi Malay: Abdul Rahman; Mahmood bin Ismail; Ahmed Maher; Ahmed Zainal Abidin; Ahmed Haji Mahmood; Mohamed Daud bin Mohamed; Second Part: In Romanised Malay: H Zainal; T Ahmed; TM Yusuff; T Mahmood; In Jawi Malay: Yahya Petra of Kelantan; Mohamed Daud bin Mohamed; Ahmed Maher; Ahmed Ismail; Ahmed bin Mahmood; Ismail Ibrahim; Yusoff Zaki Yacob; Yahya Daud

The Laws of the Constitution of Kelantan is the constitution of the state of Kelantan in Malaysia and establishes the state as a constitutional monarchy with the Sultan of Kelantan as its head of state. It also laid down the fundamental structure and machinery of government in Kelantan, such as the state executive council and the state legislative assembly. It came into force on 1 February 1948 following the formation of the Federation of Malaya.

== History ==
The Laws of the Constitution of Kelantan Part I was firstly introduced on 1 February 1948, under the reign of Sultan Ibrahim of Kelantan. Under the State Agreement, the Malay Rulers are required to promulgated their State Constitution of which are used to distinguish the legislative power from the executive power by constituting a legislative body. Part II was introduced on 2 August 1956, covering Kelantanese Royal Customs and Traditions.

== Composition ==
The Laws of the Constitution of Kelantan in its current form since 30 August 2012, contains 2 parts, 15 chapters, 117 articles and one schedule (including 40 amendments).

=== First Part ===
- First Part Preliminaries

The First Part Preliminaries contains nine articles; article 1 to 9 minus article 2. This chapter pertains to amendments, reprint and interpretation of the terminologies used in the constitution. It also affirms Islam as the state religion and Sultan as the head of state, although "other religions may be practised in peace and harmony in any part of the State". In addition, First Part Preliminaries also addresses the powers of the Sultan according to law, the state seal, flags, emblems and motto and the representative of Sultan at the Conference of Rulers.

- Chapter 1 – Executive Authority

This chapter contains eleven articles; article 10 to 27 minus deleted articles 13A, 14, 18, 19, 20, 22, 23 and 24. It pertains to executive authority power of the Sultan, the process of appointment of Menteri Besar of Kelantan, the members of Kelantan State Executive Council and rules regarding the proceedings of the council.

- Chapter 2 – Power of Pardon

This chapter contains one article; article 27A. It addresses the power of Sultan to give pardon, reprieve or respite to convicted criminals that carries out crime in the state.

- Chapter 3 – Special Provisions Relating to the Malays

This chapter contains one article; article 27B. It pertains to the special position of the Malays and the Sultan role of safeguarding it.

- Chapter 4 – Dewan Negeri

This chapter contains twenty-four articles; article 28 to 51 minus deleted article 29A, 29B, 35 and 35A. It pertains to the Kelantan State Legislative Assembly, its memberships, summoning, prorogation and dissolution, Speaker election, roles, and proceedings.

- Chapter 5 – Financial Provisions

This chapter contains ten articles; article 52 to 62 minus deleted article 58. It addresses financial issues and the budget. Article 59 addresses the capacity of the state to acquire, hold or dispose of property of any kind, and to sue or be sued. Article 60 provides that there shall be impartial treatment towards any state employees regardless of their races. Article 61 pertains to the composition, functions and powers of the State Service Commission. Article 62 - The Royal Prerogatives, provides that the Constitution shall not affect the prerogatives, powers and jurisdiction of the Sultan.

- Chapter 6 - Interpretation

This chapter contains one article; article 63 which pertains to the interpretation of the constitution.

- Chapter 7 – Transitional Provisions

This chapter contains two articles; article 64 and 65, which respectively address the membership of the temporary State Executive Council after the dissolution of Legislative Assembly and reprint of the constitution.

- First Schedule - Privileges and powers of Legislative Assembly according to Article 51
  - Freedom of speech and debate
  - Immunity of members from civil or criminal proceedings for anything done or said before the Assembly
  - Powers of Assembly to order attendance of witnesses and production of documents
  - Attendance to be notified by summons
  - Examination of witnesses upon oath
  - Exemption from answering question or producing documents
  - Privileges of witnesses
  - Certificate by Speaker that a witness has answered questions put to him by the Assembly
  - Prohibition to give evidence outside the Assembly of any evidence before the Assembly without the leave of the Assembly
  - Journals of the Assembly admissible as evidence
  - Certificate of Speaker a defence in proceedings instituted in respect of publications of the Assembly
  - Privileged publications
  - Speaker continues to act

=== Second Part ===
- Second Part Preliminaries

The Second Part Preliminaries contains three articles; article 1 to 4, minus deleted article 2. Article 1 pertains to the promulgation of the second part of the constitution. Article 3 pertains to the power to amend the constitution. Article 4 pertains to the interpretation of the terminologies used by the royal family.

- Chapter 1 – Majlis Perajaan Negeri

Chapter 1 contains thirteen articles; article 5 to 14A. This chapter pertains to the appointment and powers of members of Majlis Perajaan Negeri or Council of Succession of Kelantan, as well as the council's summoning and proceedings for confirmation of succession to the Throne, choice and appointment of a Sovereign and heirs.

- Chapter 2 - The Sovereign

Chapter 2 contains thirteen articles; articles 15 to 25, minus deleted article 20. This chapter pertains to the Sultan of Kelantan, including the qualifications of becoming the Sultan, order of successions and rules regarding the demise and prerogatives of Sultan.

- Chapter 3 - The Sovereign's Consort

Chapter 3 contains one article; article 26 that addresses rules regarding the appointment of consorts of the Sultan, their styles and titles and their entitlements.

- Chapter 4 - The Heir

Chapter 4 contains seven articles; article 27 to 33. This chapter pertains to the Heir Apparent or the Crown Prince of Kelantan (Tengku Mahkota), including the styles and titles that he may use and his role in state affairs.

- Chapter 5 - General

Chapter 5 contains two articles; article 34 and 35 that pertains to the right to surrender or cede the State and territories of Kelantan and its dependencies, as well as the power of the Sultan with Legislative Assembly consent to grant political pensions and compassionate allowances to his descendants.

- Chapter 6 - Council of Advisers

Chapter 6 contains nineteen articles; articles 36 to 52, minus deleted article 51. This chapter pertains to the appointment and powers of members of Council of Advisers, a council of persons that aids and advise the Sultan in his duties, as well as the Sultan's role as the fountain of honours and dignity.
