= Greater Patani Malay Association =

- Abbreviation: GEMPAR or GAMPAR
- Founder: Tengku Mahmood Mahyideen
- Founded: February 16, 1948
- Dissolved: 1953
- Succeeded by: Patani National Liberation Front
- Headquarters: Kota Bharu, Kelantan
- Ideology: Ethno-nationalism Irredentism
- Political position: Right Wing

Greater Patani Malay Association (Malay: Gabungan Melayu Patani Raya, abbreviated GEMPAR or GAMPAR) was a post World War II Malay nationalist organization. Founded in 1948 by Tengku Mahmood Mahyideen in Kelantan (then British Malaya), it sought to unite Thailand's four southernmost Malay-majority provinces (Pattani, Yala, Narathiwat and Satun) into a single Malay-Muslim polity. Its manifesto explicitly called for a “Malay Islamic state” and an end to “oppression” by Bangkok.

GAMPAR worked primarily through political agitation and propaganda. It was suppressed by Thai authorities in the early 1950s and ultimately dissolved. Its remnants helped spawn later Pattani insurgent groups (notably the Patani National Liberation Front in 1959).

== History ==
In the late 1940s, amid rising Malay nationalism in British Malaya, Pattani Malay leaders agitated for change. In 1946 the Pattani People's Movement (PPM) was formed by religious leader Haji Sulong to demand greater Muslim autonomy, sparking protests and clashes with Thai forces. Building on this momentum, on 16 February 1948 a coalition of Pattani exile nobles established Greater Pattani Malay Association in Kota Bharu, Kelantan. It was led by Tengku Mahmood Mahyideen, youngest son of Pattani's last sultan. Unlike earlier petitions for traditional Malay rulers restoration, GAMPAR explicitly aimed to detach Pattani-region provinces from Thailand and ultimately unite them with Malaya. Its founding manifesto (published in 1948) declared the goal of uniting Pattani, Yala, Narathiwat and Satun into “a Malay Islamic state”, freeing “its people from oppression and exploitation”.

Initially GAMPAR's activities were clandestine and largely based in Malaya. The group published pamphlets and petitions (for example, its Kelantan “Information Bureau” issued a 1948 report Some Facts about Malays in South Siam compiled by Tengku Mahmood Mahyideen) to publicize Pattani grievances. It also made direct appeals to authorities, sources note a telegram from Tengku Abdul Jalal (a GAMPAR leader) to Thai Prime Minister Phibunsongkhram in 1948. GAMPAR remained small and elite-driven; it did not field armed fighters in its early phase. However, its campaign drew swift Thai retaliation. In 1948, Prime Minister Phibunsongkhram moved to quash Malay unrest. Thai security forces clashed with demonstrators and Malay activists fled south into Malaya. The British colonial government in Malaya also cracked down on GAMPAR. Notably, in November 1948 British police raided a GAMPAR office in Singapore under accusations of irredentism. The British viewed Pattani demands as a threat to regional stability valuing alliance with Thailand over the complaint.

== Objectives and ideology ==
GAMPAR's platform was emphatically Malay-nationalist and Islamic. Its declared aim was the political liberation of the Pattani Malays from Thai rule, not on religious but on ethnic-national grounds. The 1948 letter of intent spoke of uniting “the four provinces of Pattani, Yala, Narathiwat and Satun as a Malay Islamic state”. It sought reincorporation of those provinces into British Malaya. It framed Thailand's authority as “oppression and exploitation” of a genuinely Malay people. Religious language (an Islamic state) featured, but commentators note that GAMPAR's rank-and-file appeal was mainly ethnic: the group was led by Malay-Muslim elites and spoke for Malay identity. This contrasted with later insurgent groups which often emphasized religion. In fact, after mid-century Malay-Muslim activists became increasingly influenced by Islamic revival, but GAMPAR's 1948 stance shows Malay nationalism in the decolonization era was first and foremost secular-ethnic.

== Organization and leadership ==
GAMPAR was led by local leaders and clerics called "Tok Guru's". Tengku Mahmood Mahyideen was the president and Tengku Abdul Jalal was vice president. Other members were mostly Patani Malay elites with their supporters from Kelantan and Patani. Historian Anusorn Unno stated that GAMPAR, like the contemporaneous PPM, “had a broad base of support among ordinary Malays” only in the sense that later insurgents did.

== Reception and controversies ==
Since GAMPAR's existence was brief and not well organised, there is little information on the public opinion beyond historical and academic texts. Thai officials have considered GAMPAR and PPM as illegal groups. In 2004, Thai officials had included it with other radical groups, claiming it as extremist. Exlied Patani Malays remembered GAMPAR as an official attempt for Patani independence.
