= Sultan of Kelantan =

Monarchy which rules the Malaysian state of Kelantan

- Sultan Kelantan سلطان كلنتن
- State

Incumbent
- Sultan Muhammad V, Sultan of Kelantan since 13 September 2010

Details
- Style: His Royal Highness
- Heir presumptive: Tengku Muhammad Fakhry Petra
- First monarch: Raja Sang Tawal (1267–1339); Muhammad I (First modern Sultan of Kelantan)
- Formed: 1267; 759 years ago
- Residences: Istana Negeri, Kubang Kerian, Kota Bharu, Kelantan
- Website: pejsultan.kelantan.gov.my

The Sultan of Kelantan (Malay: Sultan Kelantan, Jawi: سلطان كلنتن) is the constitutional head of Kelantan state in Malaysia. The executive power of the state is vested in him as the monarch of the state. The current sultan, Muhammad V, is the 29th Sultan of Kelantan. He is the Head of Islam in the state and the source of all titles, honours and dignities of its people. He was the 15th Yang di-Pertuan Agong or the monarch and head of state of Malaysia from 13 December 2016 to his abdication on 6 January 2019, after his election on 14 October 2016 at the 243rd (special) Conference of Rulers.

== History ==
Kelantan was historically a powerful state with trade links with early Chinese, Indian and Siamese civilisations. After being a tributary of the Majapahit and Srivijaya Empires in the 13th and 14th centuries, it fell under the power of Siam and then Malacca in the 15th century. Following the Portuguese conquest of Malacca in 1511, Kelantan dissolved into several petty fiefdoms. These were conquered again by the Siamese and made subject to neighbouring Pattani.

In 1760, the raja at Kubang Labu, variously identified by accounts as either Long Muhammad or Long Pandak, succeeded in reuniting the disparate territories under a single ruler. Four years later, he was overthrown by Long Yunus, an aristocratic warlord of Pattani origin, who seized the throne and proclaimed himself Raja of Kelantan. Following the death of Raja Yunus in 1795, control of the state passed to Terengganu. In 1800, Long Muhammad, son of Yunus, declared himself Sultan Muhammad I. He was eventually accepted by the Siamese as ruler of a separate tributary, in 1812.

In September 2010, Sultan Ismail Petra was constitutionally deposed by the State Succession Council in favour of his eldest son, Tengku Muhammad Faris Petra (the current sultan). The elder sultan had failed to sufficiently recover from a debilitating stroke he had suffered the previous May. This was followed by several months of litigation by lawyers acting on behalf of the former sultan.

== Residences ==
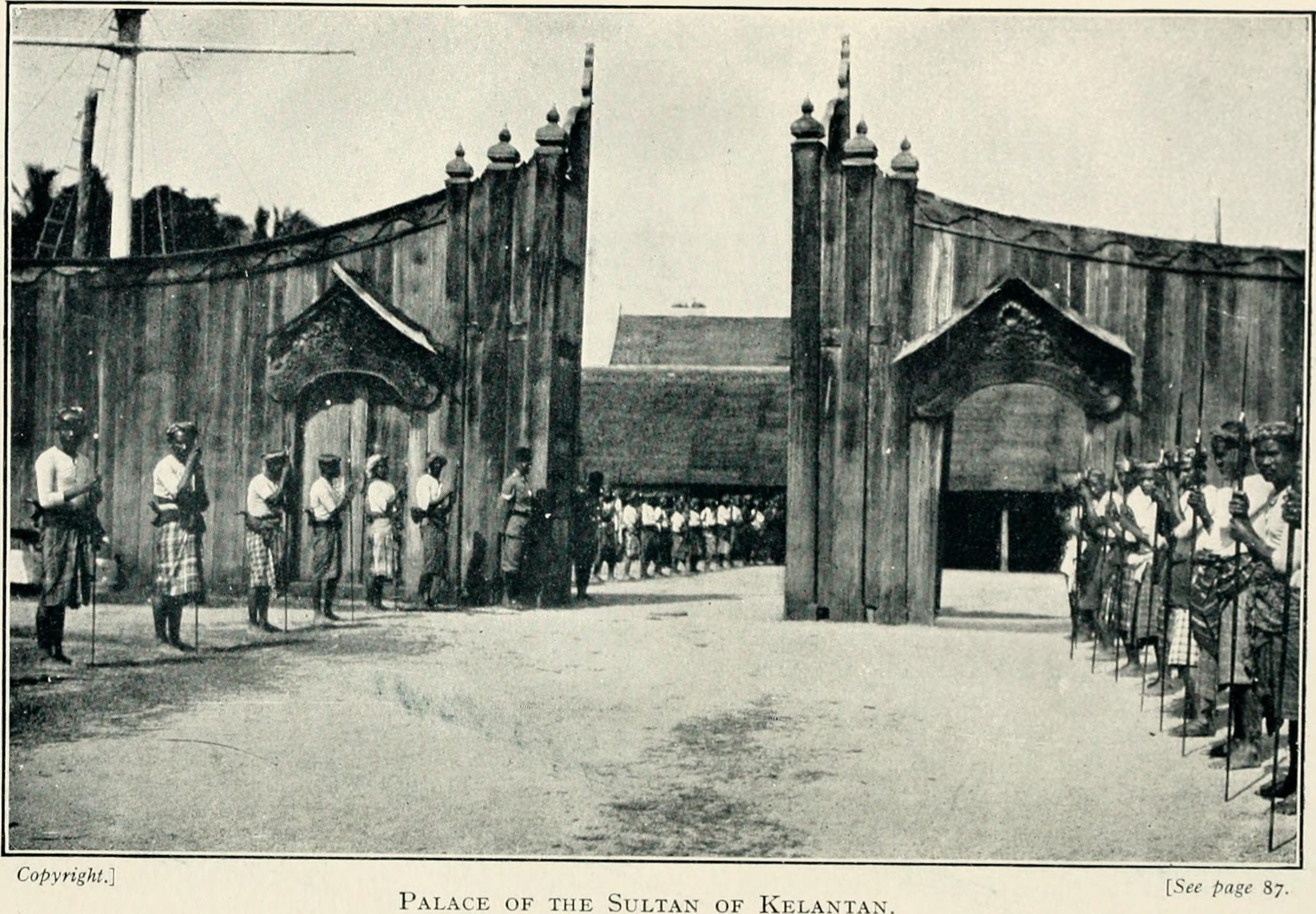
Palace of the Sultan of Kelantan, 1912.

- Istana Negeri (State Palace), located at Kubang Kerian, a district of Kota Bharu, is the official residence of the current ruler, Sultan Muhammad V. In addition, a number of official ceremonies have been performed at this palace.
- Istana Mahkota (Crown Palace), also at Kubang Kerian, is the official residence of Sultan Muhammad V's mother Raja Perempuan Tengku Anis.
- Istana Balai Besar (Grand Hall Palace), located in the downtown area of Kota Bharu, was constructed in 1840 under the orders of Sultan Muhammad II (r. 1835–1886). It replaced the old palace at Kota Lama as the administrative centre of the sultanate, and also served as the residence of a number of sultans. Since its completion, the town where the palace is located was named Kota Bharu (meaning "new fort") and later became the state capital of Kelantan. It now serves as the main palace for state ceremonial functions.
- Istana Telipot (Telipot Palace), located in Kota Bharu, served, until recently, as the official residence of the current sultan whilst he was heir-apparent.
- Istana Bukit Tanah (Bukit Tanah Palace), located in Tumpat, It is understood that the palace was built before the Japanese rule of about 1910, during the reign of Sultan Ismail Ibni Almarhum Sultan Muhammad IV.
- Istana Kota Lama (Old Fortress Palace), located on the banks of the Kelantan River, is the old palace of the modern sultanate, and served as the official residence of the sultans of the early 19th century. Its proximity to the river made it subject to flooding, and was replaced by the Istana Balai Besar in 1840, and subsequently renamed (Kota Lama means "old fortress"). However, it continues to be used as the official residence of the crown prince and Kelantan royal family.
- Istana Jahar (Jahar Palace), located in downtown Kota Bharu, was built in 1887 by Sultan Ahmad (r. 1886–1890) for his son and heir-apparent, Sultan Muhammad III (r. 1890–1891). The name Jahar was taken from the tree that stands at the entrance, also known as "Flame of the Forest". It now houses the Museum of Royal Traditions and Ceremonies (Malay: Muzium Adat Istiadat Diraja).
- Istana Batu (Batu Palace), located in downtown Kota Bharu, was completed in 1939 under the reign of Sultan Ismail I (1920–1944). It was built as a wedding gift for his nephew and eventual successor, Sultan Yahya Petra (r. 1960–1979). It later served as the residence of the next crown prince, Sultan Ismail Petra. It now houses the Royal Museum (Malay: Muzium Diraja).

== Succession ==
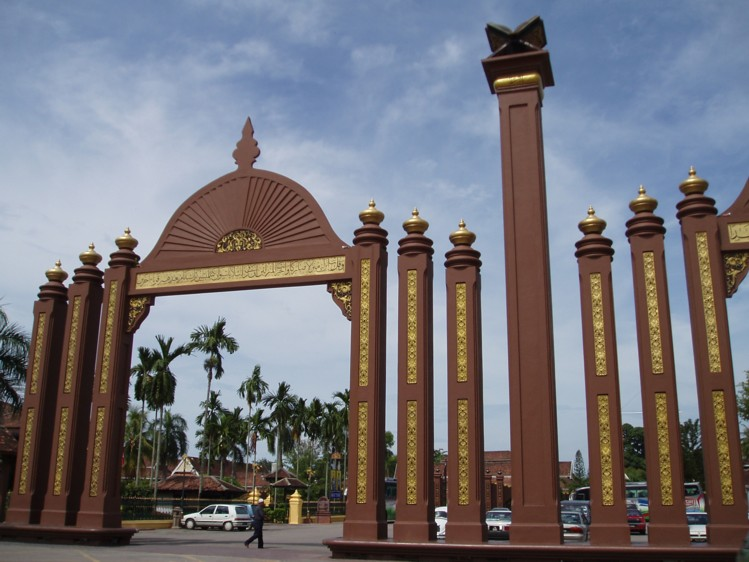
The Sultan Ismail Petra Arch in Kota Bharu

The succession order of Kelantan sultanate is determined by agnatic primogeniture. No female may become ruler, and female line descendants are generally excluded from succession. According to Laws of the Constitution of Kelantan (in Malay language: Undang-undang Perlembagaan Tubuh Kerajaan Kelantan), the Sultan of Kelantan must be Malay, royal in blood, descendant of the Kelantan sultanate, male and a Muslim. The crown prince is also subjected to the same rule. The constitution states that the Sultan must come from the line of Sultan Ismail Petra, only if there are no longer eligible descendant of him, then the sultan should be chosen from the descendants of Sultan Yahya Petra and so on.

The order of the descendants, in descending order of degree of kinship : Sultan Ismail Petra, Sultan Yahya Petra, Sultan Ibrahim, Sultan Ismail, Sultan Muhammad IV.

=== Current order of succession ===
The current order of succession is as follow:

- Sultan Ismail Petra (1949–2019)
  - Sultan Muhammad V (born 1969)
    - (-) Tengku Ismail Leon Petra (born 2019)
  - (-) Tengku Muhammad Fa-iz Petra (born 1974)
    - (-) Tengku Muhammad Johan Petra (born 2023)
  - (1) Tengku Muhammad Fakhry Petra, Tengku Mahkota, the Crown Prince (born 1978)

- previous Sultan - current Sultan

== List of dynasties and rulers ==
=== Sultans and Rajas of the Malay Kingdom of Langkasuka Dynasty ===
- 1267–1339: Raja Sang Tawal (Abdullah), Raja of Langkasuka, elder son of Raja Sakranta, Maharaja of Jawaka. Defeated by the Siamese in 1295 and fled from Ligor after losing Singgora, finally settling in Kelantan here he established a new capital
- 1339–1362: Sultan Mahmud Shah ibnu 'Abdu'llah, Raja of Langkasuka and Kelantan, son of Paduka Sri Sang Tawal
- 1362–1418: Sultan Baki Shah ibni al-Marhum Sultan Mahmud Shah, Raja of Chermin, son of Sultan Mahmud ibnu Abdullah, Raja of Langkasuka and Kelantan
- 1418–1429: Sultan Sadik Muhammad Shah ibni al-Marhum Sultan Baki Shah [Maulana Nenggiri]
- 1429–1467: Sultan Iskandar Shah ibni al-Marhum Sultan Baki Shah
- 1467–1522: Sultan Mansur Shah I ibni al-Marhum Sultan Iskandar Shah
- 1522–1526: Sultan Gombak Shah ibni al-Marhum Sultan Mansur Shah
- 1526–1547: Sultan Ahmad Shah son of Raja Muda Mansur Shah II son of al-Marhum Sultan Gombak Shah. Succeeded on the death of his grandfather
- 1547–1561: Sultan Mansur Shah III ibni al-Marhum Sultan Ahmad Shah
- 1561–1565: Sultan Ibrahim Shah ibni al-Marhum Sultan Mansur Shah III (first time)
- 1565–1570: Raja Umar bin Raja Ahmad bin Raja Muhammad ibni Sultan Gombak Shah, Raja Muhammad bith in of (Terengganu)
- 1570–1579: Paduka Sri Sultan Ibrahim Shah ibni al-Marhum Sultan Mansur Shah III (second time)

=== Sultans and Rajas from Jembal Dynasty ===
- 1579–1597: Sultan Addil ud-din ibni al-Marhum Nik Jamal ud-din (1 time)
- 1597–1602: Sultan Muhammad ibni al-Marhum Sultan Ibrahim
- 1602–1605: Sultan Addil ud-din ibni al-Marhum Nik Jamal ud-din (2 time), Raja of Kelantan
- 1605–1616: Sultan Samir ud-din ibni al-Marhum Nik Jamal ud-din, Raja of Kelantan, son of Nik Jamal ud-din bin Wan Abul Muzaffar, Deputy King of Champa
- 1616–1637: Sultan 'Abdu'l Kadir ibni al-Marhum Sultan Samir ud-din
- 1637–1649: Raja Sakti I ibni al-Marhum Sultan 'Abdu'l Kadir, Raja of Kelantan-Utara (Jembal) and Patani
- 1649–1663: Raja Loyor bin Raja Sakti I
- 1663–1667: Interregnum or queen Puteri Saadong
- 1667–1671: Ratu Sa'adong I binti Raja Loyor, Putri Wijayamala, Raja of Jembal
- 1671–1676: Sultan Abdul Rahim ibni al-Marhum Sultan Samir ud-din Bahar
- 1675–1721: Sultan Omar Ibni Al-Marhum Raja Sakti I

=== Sultans and Rajas of Patani Dynasty ===
==== 18th century ====
- 1721–1734: Raja Long Bahar bin Dato' Pengkalan Tua Wan Daim, son of a Bugis adventurer who arrived and settled in Patani around 1640. Styled Laksamana and Tuan Long Besar before his accession. Succeeded his father-in-law, as Regent 1715. Became Raja of Patani soon afterwards, but was expelled by Raja Bendang Badan in 1716. Succeeded on the death of his grand father-in-law, as Raja of Kelantan-Utara (Jembal), before 22 October 1721. Assumed the title of Sultan. He married his first wife, Raja Mas Kelantan of Patani (d. 1707), daughter of Raja Bakar of Patani. His second marriage was to Pah binti Raja Sakti, daughter of Raja Sakti II of Kelantan. His daughter is Sri Biji di-Raja of Patani.
- 1734–1739; 1746–1756: Raja Long Sulaiman Bin Long Bahar, son of Long Bahar and his father's first wife Raja Mas Kelantan. Succeeded on the death of his father, 1734. Deposed by his cousin in 1739 and restored again in 1746 and lastly deposed by his son-in-law in 1756.
- 1739–1746: Interregnum during the First Kelantanese Civil War between Raja Long Pandak of the western faction and Raja Long Sulaiman of the eastern faction.
- 1756–1758: Raja Long Pandak bin Tuan Sulung Bin Dato' Pengkalan Tua Wan Daim. Succeeded as ruler of West Kelantan around 1717. Granted the title of Dato' Sri Maharaja by Sultan Sulaiman Badrul Alam Syah of Johor on 1741. Later recognised as ruler of all Kelantan by his brother-in-law, Long Derahman, and installed at Fort Kubang Labu, 1756.
- 1758–1763: Raja Long Muhammad bin Tuan Sulung. Appointed heir apparent (Raja Muda) by his brother in 1756. Proclaimed as Raja of Kelantan by Long Derahman, at Fort Kubang Labu, before 1758. Expelled from Kubang Labu by Long Yunus before 1763.
- 1763–1795: Raja Long Yunus bin Raja Long Sulaiman. Expelled Long Muhammad and became Raja of Kelantan at Fort Kubang Labu, before 1763. Became Raja and Yang di-Pertuan of Kelantan, 1776 and installed as Yang di-Pertuan Muda of Kelantan by his father-in-law Sultan Mansur Shah I of Terengganu in 1793. Married his first wife before 1741, Jumat, Inche' Puan Balai Dua, daughter of Engku Tanang Wangsa of Trengganu. His second marriage around 1793 was to Inche' Encik Tuan Nawi, daughter of Sultan Mansur Riayat Shah I of Terengganu.
- 1795–1800: Tengku Muhammad ibni Sultan Mansur Riayat Shah I of Terengganu. First marriage on 1764 to Engku Wan Teh, daughter of Paduka Sri Raja Long Yunus. Installed as second Yang di-Pertuan Muda of Kelantan in 1795 after his father-in-law's death. Defeated by Long Muhammad in 1800.

==== 19th century ====
- 1800–1835: Sultan Muhammad I expelled his brother-in-law Tengku Muhammad with Chinese help. Installed as Raja and Yang di-Pertuan Besar of Kelantan on November 1801 and became a separate tributary of Siam in 1812.
- 1835–1836 (jointly): Tengku Long Zainal Abidin ibni al-Marhum Raja Long Yunus (along with Sultan Muhammad II). Installed as Raja Bendahara 17 November 1801. Appointed as Governor of Banggul and granted the title of Phaya Banggul by King Rama I of Siam 1812. Assumed power after the death of Sultan Muhammad I as regent with the title of Yang di-Pertuan Muda in 1835. Deposed by Sultan Muhammad II in 1837. He died at Nongchik, Patani, 1845.
- 1836–1886: Sultan Muhammad II ibni al-Marhum Tengku Temenggong Long Tan bin Raja Long Yunus. As a consequence of dissension within the Royal Family, he was obliged by the Siamese to share power with his uncle, Tengku Long Zainal Abidin. Recognised as ruler by the King of Siam and raised to the title of Phaya Visit Bakdiya 1836. Raised his station by King Rama V of Siam on March 1877.
- 1886–1889: Sultan Ahmad ibni Long Senik Mulut Merah. Appointed as regent of Kelantan but installed as Yang Di-Pertuan of Kelantan by Siam on October 1886 after his father Muhammad II died. Before that he was appointed as Siamese Governor over Kelantan and presented with a Sword of Honour, 14 June 1869 by King Rama IV.
- 1889–1890: Sultan Muhammad III ibni Sultan Ahmad Ibni al-Marhum Sultan Ahmad. Born 1845, he was the eldest son of Sultan Ahmad. Appointed Raja Bendahara and Tengku Sri Indra before his accession. Appointed as Heir Apparent with the title of Raja Kelantan in September 1887. Succeeded on the death of his father on March 1889. Installed as Sultan and Yang di-Pertuan Besar, at Istana Balai Besar, Kota Bharu in September 1890. First marriage to Tengku Sofia binti al-Marhum Tengku Putih, daughter to Tengku Puteh ibni al-Marhum of Patani. He died at Istana Balai Besar, Kota Bharu, 11 May 1890 and buried in the Royal Cemetery, Kampung Langgar.
- 1890–1899: Sultan Mansur ibni Sultan Ahmad ibni al-Marhum Sultan Ahmad Tengah. Born 1870, he was son to Sultan Ahmad. Appointed as heir presumptive (Raja Muda) in September 1887. Then he was installed as heir apparent and regent for his brother (as Raja Kelantan) in September 1889. Succeeded on his death, as Yang di-Pertuan in 1890 and granted the title of Phra Visit Bakdiya in 1897. Proclaimed as Paduka Sri Sultan in 1898. Married Engku Nik binti al-Marham Raja Patani (whom died after 1897). He died at Istana Johar, Kota Bharu on 17 June 1899 and buried at the Royal Cemetery, Kampung Langgar.

==== 20th century ====
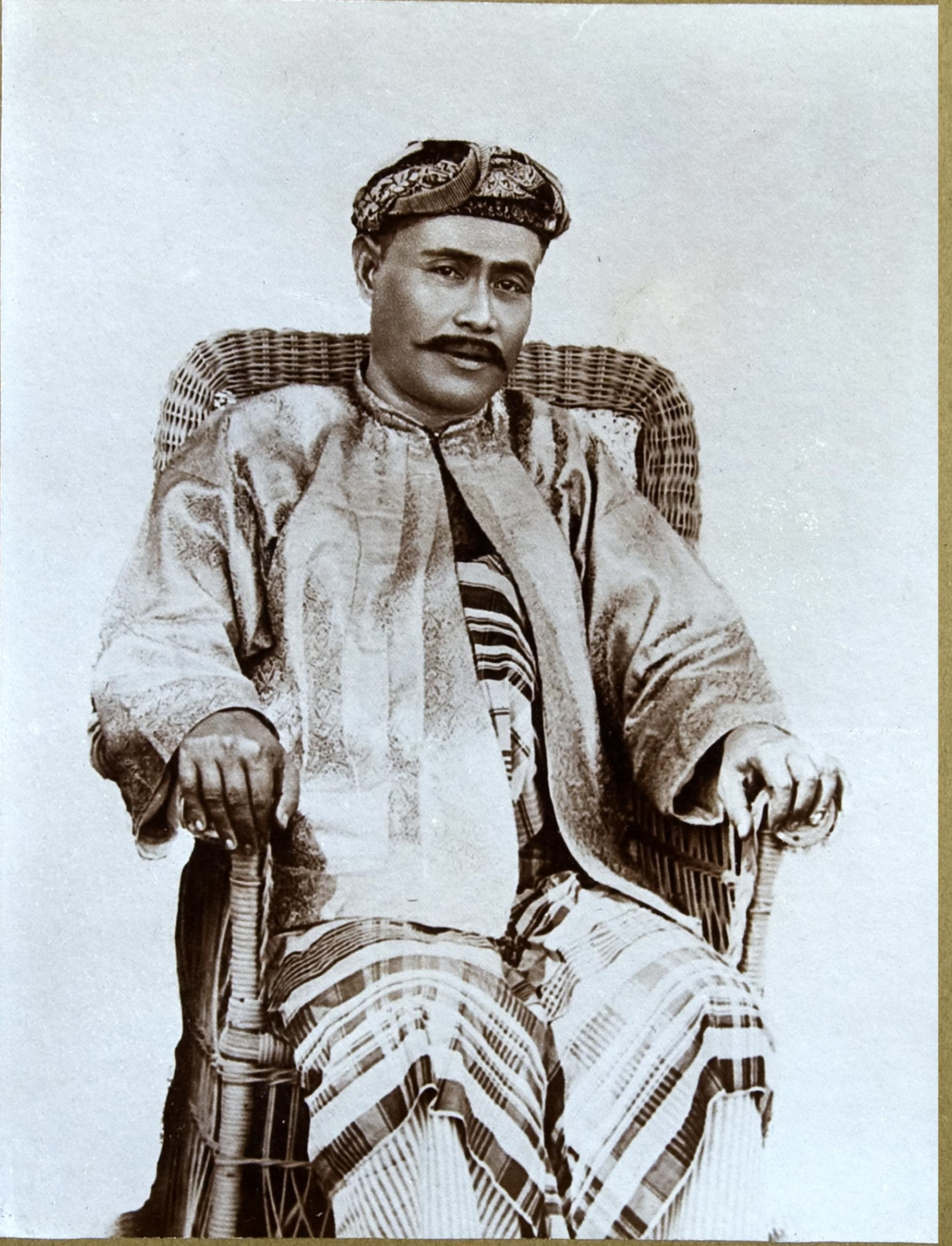
Sultan Muhammad IV ibni Sultan Muhammad III, c. 1909–1910

- 1899–1920: Sultan Muhammad IV Ibni Sultan Muhammad III. Born in Kota Bharu on 23 May 1870, son of Sultan Muhammad III and his wife Tengku Sofia. He was granted the title of Tengku Sri Indra on 23 September 1890. Appointed as heir presumptive(as Raja Muda) on 25 July 1898 and then granted the title of Phaya Bpakdi Sri Sultan Muhammad Ratna Nuchit Siti Santun Wiwangsa Pia Kelantan by the King of Siam. Succeeded on the death of his childless uncle on 17 June 1899. Installed as Raja Kelantan and Yang di-Pertuan on 9 February 1900. Kelantan was transferred to British Protection on 19 July 1909. Crowned as Paduka Sri Baginda Sultan Muhammad IV on 22 June 1911. Altered the name of the state to Negeri Kelantan Dar ul-Naim, July 1916. Founded the Darjah Kerabat Yang Amat di-Hormatai (Royal Family Order) and the Paduka Mahkota Kelantan al-Muhammad (the Order of the Crown of Kelantan of Muhammad) on 1916. Married his first wife in 1888, Nik Wan Zainab binti Nik Wan Muhammad Amin (1877–1928) whom was crowned as sultanah on 15 February 1916. He died at the Istana, Kota Bharu, 23 December 1920 and buried at the Royal Cemetery, Kampung Langgar.
- 1920–1944: Sultan Ismail ibni Almarhum Sultan Muhammad IV. Born in Kota Bharu on 20 August 1880, eldest son of Sultan Muhammad IV. Granted the title of Tengku Sri Jaya Raja and promoted to Tengku Sri Indra Mahkota 11 March 1901. Granted the title of Phra Rattasadana Adipati Putra by the King of Siam 1901. Appointed as heir apparent and formally invested with the title of Raja Kelantan on 22 June 1911. Succeeded on the death of his father on 23 December 1920. Crowned at Istana Balai Besar, Kota Bharu, 28 April 1921. Married his first wife Tengku Petri binti Tengku Long. While his second wife was Tengku Nik bin Tengku Kaya Pahlawan and third wife was Wan Mek, from Bukit Marak. His fourth wife was Tengku Sri Mariam binti Tengku Ahmad. He died from tuberculosis, at Istana Jahar, Kota Bharu on 20 June 1944 and was buried in the Royal Cemetery, Kampung Langgar.
- 1944–1960: Sultan Ibrahim ibni Almarhum Sultan Muhammad IV. Born at Istana Balai Besar, Kota Bharu on 9 October 1897. He was the second son of Sultan Muhammad IV. Granted the title of Tengku Sri Indra Mahkota by his father on 22 June 1911. Appointed as heir apparent (as Raja Kelantan) on 21 April 1921. Succeeded on the death of his brother on 20 June 1944 and proclaimed the next day where he was crowned at Istana Balai Besar, Kota Bharu on 25 October 1944. Attended the Coronation of Queen Elizabeth II in London in 1953. His first marriage was to Tengku Zainab binti Tengku Zainal Abidin on 6 July 1914, she was a daughter of Tengku Long Zainal Abidin. His second marriage happened in 1915 (but divorced later in 1929) and was to Tengku Yah binti Tengku Long Sulaiman. Married his third wife, Cik Embong binti Daud in 1916. While he married his fourth wife Cik Siti and fifth marriage to Cik Safiah. While his sixth marriage was to Cik Habiba. He died from a cerebral haemorrhage at Istana Sri Cemerlang, Kota Bharu on 9 July 1960 and buried at the Royal Cemetery, Kampung Langgar.

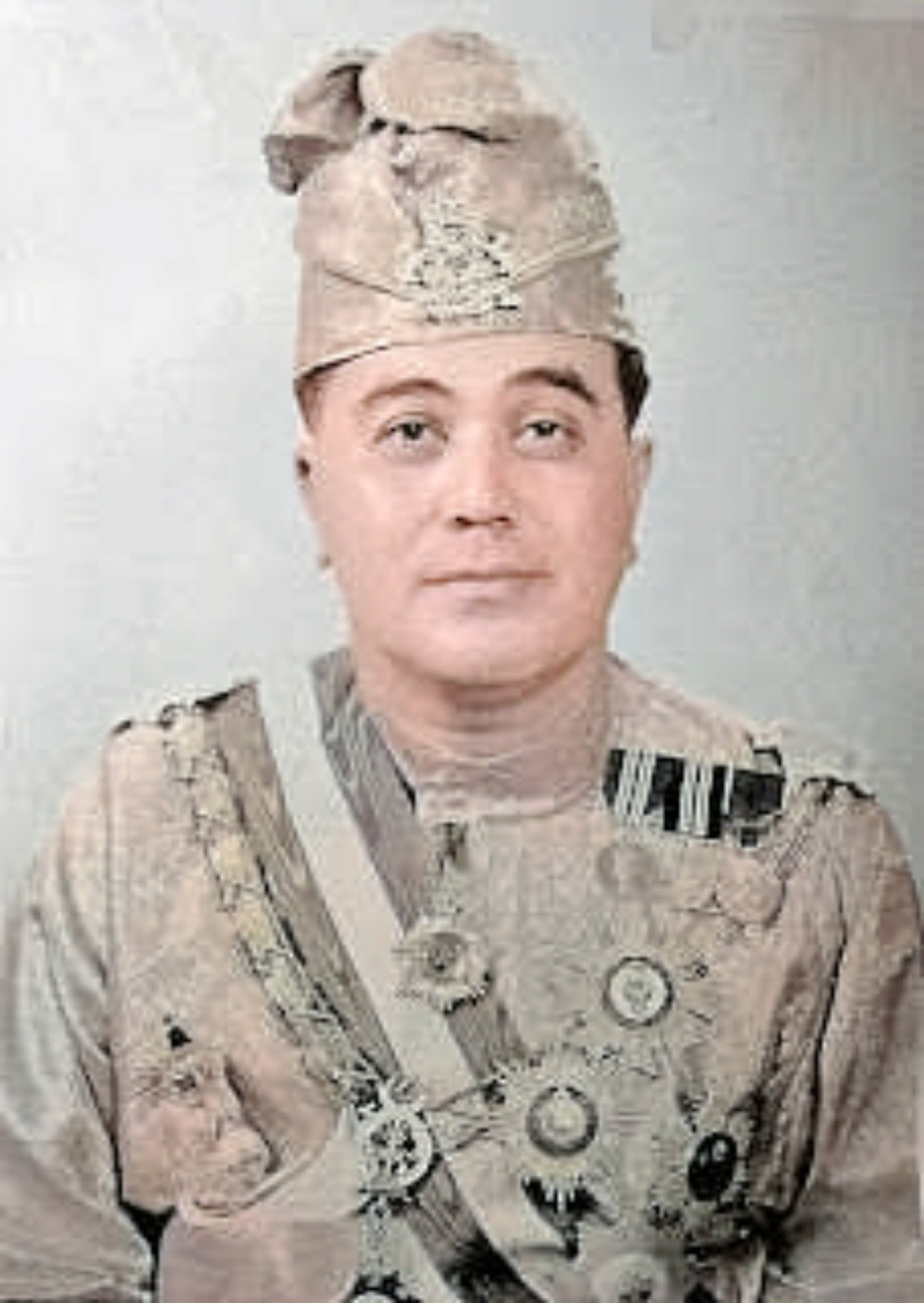
Sultan Yahya Petra ibni Sultan Ibrahim

- 1960–1979: Sultan Yahya Petra ibni Almarhum Sultan Ibrahim Sultan. Born at Istana Kota Lama, Kota Bharu on 10 December 1917. He was the second son of Sultan Ibrahim. He was educated at the Francis Light School in Georgetown, Penang, and later in England. Raised by his heirless uncle, Sultan Ismail I. Invested with the title of Tengku Temenggong on 21 July 1939, and promoted to Tengku Bendahara on 6 February 1945. Appointed as heir apparent in preference to his eldest brother and granted the title of Tengku Mahkota on 1 February 1948. Formally invested at the Istana Balai Besar, Kota Bharu, 19 June 1948. He was Vice-President of the Council of Religion & Malay Customs (1941–1947; 1948–1953), Private Sec. to the Sultan (1943–1944), Assistant State Treasurer (1944–1945), Territorial Chief (Ketua Jajahan) of Kota Bharu (1945–1948) and Regent of Kelantan (3–30 June 1953; 12 August–12 December 1958). Succeeded on the death of his father on 9 July 1960. Installed at the Istana Balai Besar, Kota Bharu, 10 December 1960, and crowned there by the Tengku Panglima Raja on 17 July 1961. Became Deputy Supreme Head of State Timbalan Yang di-Pertuan Agong from 22 July 1970, and Yang di-Pertuan Agong on 21 September 1975. He was Col-in-Chief the Malaysian Artillery Regt (1966–1979). Patron of The Kelantan Royal Project. Rcvd: DKM, DK (21 July 1939), DMN (17 July 1961), and SMN (31 August 1958) of Malaysia, SPMK (9 August 1950), SJMK (9 August 1959), SPSK, DK of Brunei (1961), Terengganu (23 June 1964), Selangor (21 July 1966), Kedah (5 July 1969), Pahang, and Perlis (13 February 1978), and DP of Sarawak. His first marriage was to Tengku Zainab binti Tengku Muhammad Petra (1917–1993) on 4 June 1939. His third marriage was to Tengku Alexandria binti Tengku Yusof. He died of a heart attack at Istana Negara, Kuala Lumpur on 29 March 1979 and was buried at the Royal Cemetery, Kampung Langgar.
- 1979–2010: Sultan Ismail Petra ibni Almarhum Sultan Yahya Petra Sultan. Born at Istana Jahar, Kota Bharu on 11 November 1949, eldest son of Sultan Yahya Petra and Tengku Zainab. Educated privately and at Sultan Ismail College, Kota Bharu. Installed as heir apparent (as Tengku Mahkota) on 11 November 1967. Served as regent during the absence of his father from the state (6–25 July 1974; 12 July–28 August 1975; 21 September–29 March 1979). Succeeded on the death of his father on 29 March 1979. Crowned at Istana Balai Besar, Kota Bharu on 30 March 1980. He was formally deposed in favour of his eldest son by the Kelantan Royal Succession Council of State, on the grounds of incapacity after failing to fully recover from a debilitating stroke on 13 September 2010 (after an amendment to the state constitution gazetted 22 July 2010). Thereafter styled Duli Yang Maha Mulia Sultan Ismail Petra. He was Maj TA (1 November 1974), prom Hon Lieut-Col (1 January 1976), Hon Col (15 March 1988), and Hon Maj-Gen, Colonel-in-Chief of the Royal Artillery Regt (1997), and of the Royal Intelligence Corps. Hon D.Phil. from the University Malaysia Sabah (2007). He was patron of the Royal Kelantan Club until 1992. Rcvd: DK, SPMK, SJMK, SPKK, SPSK, DMN, SMN (25 February 1959), DK of Negri Sembilan, Selangor (13 November 1988), Johor, Kedah, Perak, Terengganu, and Perlis, DKMB of Brunei, DPSS of Sarawak, DP of Sarawak. His first marriage was on 4 December 1968 (for nikah) and 12 March 1969 (for zifaf), to Tengku Anis binti Tengku Abdul Hamid (born 1949). His second marriage to Cik Puan Elia Suhana binti Ahmad (born 1979) was in Kota Bharu, Kelantan on 23 December 2007 but they divorced on 12 February 2010. He died of heart failure at Raja Perempuan Zainab II Hospital, Kota Bharu on 28 September 2019 and was buried at the Royal Cemetery, Kampung Langgar.

==== 21st century ====
- 2010–present: Sultan Muhammad V, Sultan and Yang di-Pertuan of Kelantan. Born on 6 October 1969, eldest son of Sultan Ismail Petra and his wife, Tengku Anis binti Tengku Abdul Hamid. He was educated at Sultan Ismail Satu School in Kota Bharu, Alice Smith School in Kuala Lumpur, Oakham School in Rutland, the St Cross College, Oxford, the Oxford Centre for Islamic Studies, the Deutsche Stiftung für internationale Entwicklung in Berlin, and the European Business School, London. Appointed as heir apparent (as Tengku Mahkota) on 6 October 1985 and installed at Istana Balai Besar, Kota Bharu on 6 October 1987. Appointed as regent on behalf of his incapacitated father who suffered a stroke in May 2009. Formally installed as regent and acting Sultan of Kelantan on 25 May 2009. Succeeded on the incapacitation of his father on 13 September 2010. Became Deputy Supreme Head of State Timbalan Yang di-Pertuan Agong from 13 December 2011, and Yang di-Pertuan Agong on 13 December 2016. He married his first wife Tengku Zubaidah binti Tengku Norudin (born 1979) and she was styled Tengku Ampuan Mahkota on 15 November 2004 and they divorced in 2008. His second marriage to Che Puan Nur Diana Petra Abdullah (born 1988) was on 30 October 2010 and she was proclaimed as Sultanah on 2 August 2022. Married his third wife, Oksana Voevodina (born 1992) in Kota Bharu, Kelantan on 7 June 2018, divorced only a year later in 2019.

== List of modern Kelantan sultans (1899–present) ==
Name	Duration of reign	Portrait (Coronation, when available)	Birth Date, location, parents	Birth Name	Marriage	Death	Age	House	Ref.
20th century
Muhammad IV; Sultan Muhammad IV ibni al-Marhum Sultan Muhammad III; 10 February 1899 — 23 December 1920	21 years, 318 days		23 May 1870 Kota Bharu, Kelantan, British Malaya Son of Sultan Muhammad III ibni al-Marhum Sultan Ahmad and Tengku Ampuan Sofia binti al-Marhum Tengku Putih		Sultanah Zainab binti Nik Muhammad Amin 1888 9 children	23 December 1920; Kota Bharu, Kelantan	50 years, 214 days	Long Yunus	
Ismail; Sultan Ismail ibni Almarhum Sultan Muhammad IV; 23 August 1920 — 20 June 1944	23 years, 303 days	—N/a	20 August 1880; Kota Bharu, Kelantan, British Malaya Son of Sultan Muhammad IV ibni al-Marhum Sultan Muhammad III and Sultanah Zainab binti Nik Muhammad Amin		Tengku Petri binti Tengku Long; 1910; 2 children	20 June 1944; Istana Jahar, Kota Bharu, Kelantan	63 years, 305 days	Long Yunus	
Ibrahim; Sultan Ibrahim ibni al-Marhum Sultan Muhammad IV; 21 June 1944 — 9 July 1960	16 years, 19 days	—N/a	9 October 1897; Kota Bharu, Kelantan, Unfederated Malay States Son of Sultan Muhammad IV ibni al-Marhum Sultan Muhammad III and Sultanah Zainab binti Nik Muhammad Amin		Tengku Zainab binti Tengku Zainal Abidin; 1914; 3 children Tengku Yah binti Tengku Long Sulaiman; 2 children Embong binti Daud; 6 children Siti; 5 children Safiah; 5 children Habibah; 3 children	9 July 1960; Istana Sri Cemerlang, Kota Bharu, Kelantan, Federation of Malaya	62 years, 274 days	Long Yunus	
Yahya Petra; Sultan Yahya Petra ibni Almarhum Sultan Ibrahim; 10 July 1960 — 29 March 1979	18 years, 263 days		10 December 1917; Istana Balai Besar, Kota Bharu, Kelantan, Unfederated Malay States, British Malaya Son of Sultan Ibrahim Ibni Almarhum Sultan Muhammad IV and Che Puan Besar Embong Binti Daud	Tengku Yahya Petra ibni Tengku Ibrahim	Tengku Zainab binti Tengku Muhammad Petra; 1939; 7 children Tengku Alexandria binti Tengku Yusof; 3 children	29 March 1979; Istana Negara, Kuala Lumpur, Malaysia	61 years, 109 days	Long Yunus	
Ismail Petra; Sultan Ismail Petra ibni Almarhum Sultan Yahya Petra; 30 March 1979 — Abdicated 13 September 2010	31 years, 168 days		11 November 1949; Istana Jahar, Kota Bharu, Kelantan, Malaya Son of Sultan Yahya Petra Ibni Almarhum Sultan Ibrahim and Tengku Zainab binti Tengku Muhammad Petra	Tengku Ismail Petra ibni Tengku Yahya Petra	Tengku Anis binti Tengku Abdul Hamid 1968; 4 children Elia Suhana binti Ahmad 2007–2010	28 September 2019; Raja Perempuan Zainab II Hospital, Kota Bharu, Kelantan, Malaysia	69 years, 321 days	Long Yunus	
21st century
Muhammad V Sultan Muhammad V 13 September 2010 — Present	16 years, 71 days		6 October 1969; Istana Batu, Kota Bharu, Kelantan, Malaysia Son of Sultan Ismail Petra ibni Almarhum Sultan Yahya Petra and Tengku Anis binti Tengku Abdul Hamid	Tengku Muhammad Faris Petra ibni Tengku Ismail Petra	Tengku Zubaidah binti Tengku Norudin (née Kangsadal Pipitpakdee) 2004–2008 Sultanah Nur Diana Petra Abdullah (née Jana Jakoubková) 2010; Rihana Oksana Gorbatenko 2018–2019; 1 child	Alive	57 years, 47 days	Long Yunus	

== See also ==
- Kelantan royal family
- Family tree of Kelantanese monarchs
- Family tree of Malaysian monarchs
