= Kelantan Royal Mausoleum =

Malaysian royal burial ground

- Makam Diraja Langgar مقام دراج لڠݢر
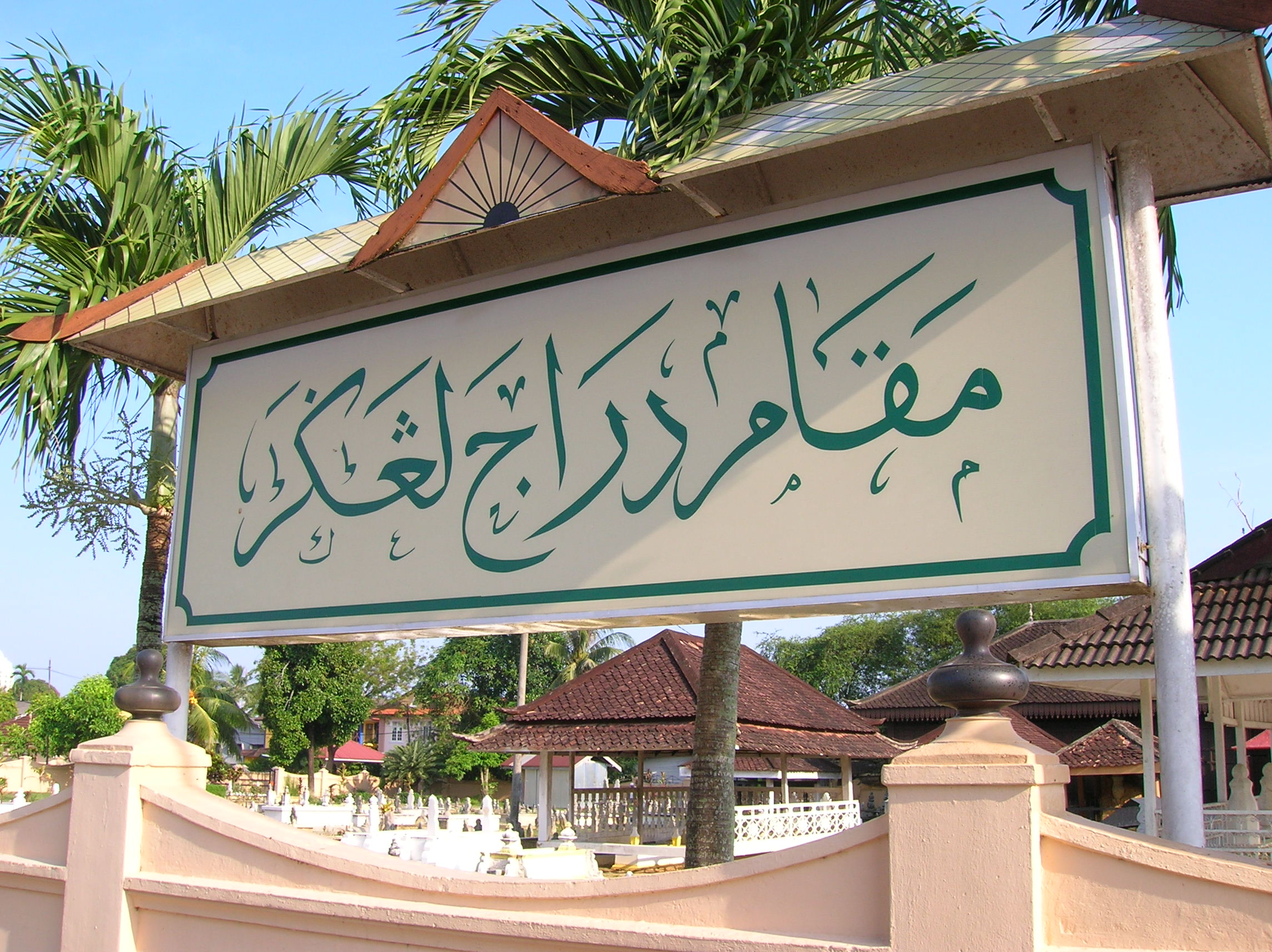
- Kelantan Royal Mausoleum
- Interactive map of Kelantan Royal Mausoleum

Details
- Established: 1794 or earlier
- Location: Kampung Langgar, Kota Bharu, Kelantan, Malaysia
- Coordinates: 6.1160°N 102.2491°E
- Type: Royal Mausoleum
- Owned by: Kelantan Religious and Malay Customs Council (MAIK)
- No. of graves: Unknown
- Website: makam.e-maik.my/MAKAMlist.asp

Kelantan Royal Mausoleum or Langgar Royal Mausoleum is a Kelantan royal burial ground located at Kampung Langgar near Kota Bharu, Kelantan, Malaysia. It is located next to the Langgar Mosque on Jalan Langgar, in the Langgar subdistrict. Numerous members of the royal family of Kelantan are interred in the burial ground.

== Sultan graves ==
- Long Yunus (died 1798)
- Sultan Muhammad I (died 1835)
- Sultan Muhammad II (died 1886)
- Sultan Ahmad (died 1889)
- Sultan Muhammad III (died 1890)
- Sultan Mansur (died 1899)
- Sultan Muhammad IV (died 20 December 1920)
- Sultan Ismail (died 20 June 1944)
- Sultan Ibrahim (died 9 July 1960)
- Sultan Yahya Petra – the 6th Yang di-Pertuan Agong (died 29 March 1979)
- Sultan Ismail Petra (died 28 September 2019)

== Sultanah/Raja Perempuan graves ==
- Sultanah Zainab binti Muhammad Amin (died 23 July 1928)
- Raja Perempuan Zainab I binti Al-Marhum Tengku Zainal Abidin (died 28 September 1985)
- Raja Perempuan Zainab II binti Almarhum Tengku Sri Utama Raja Tengku Muhammad Petra – the 6th Raja Permaisuri Agong (died 10 January 1993)

== Royal family graves ==
- Tengku Abdul Kadir Kamaruddin ibni Al-Marhum Sultan Sulaiman Sharifuddin Syah – the last Raja of the Pattani Kingdom (died 19 May 1933)
- Tengku Long Abdul Ghaffar ibni Al-Marhum Sultan Muhammad II – Tengku Temenggong (died: unknown date)
- Tengku Long Zainal Abidin ibni Al-Marhum Sultan Muhammad III – Raja Dewa (died 1945)
- Tengku Muhammad Hamzah bin Tengku Zainal Abidin – Tengku Sri Maharaja (died 25 February 1962)
- Tengku Muhammad Petra bin Tengku Idris – Tengku Sri Utama Raja (died 11 March 1949)
- Tengku Kembang Petri binti Al-Marhum Sultan Muhammad IV – Tengku Maharani Putri (died 26 November 1949)
- Tengku Embong binti Al-Marhum Sultan Muhammad III (died 19 April 1953)
- Tengku Mahmood Mahyideen bin Tengku Abdul Kadir Kamaruddin (died 12 February 1954)
- Tengku Long Abdul Rahman bin Tengku Muhammad Petra – Tengku Sri Kelana D’Raja (died 30 August 1965)
- Tengku Mariam binti Tengku Ahmad (died 1965)
- Cik Embong binti Daud – Che’ Puan Besar (died 31 December 1971)
- Tengku Indera Petra ibni Almarhum Sultan Ibrahim – Tengku Besar Indera Raja (died 23 July 1984)
- Tengku Long Ahmad bin Tengku Long Abdul Ghaffar – Tengku Panglima Raja (died 1 August 1989)
- Tengku Yah binti Tengku Sulaiman – Tengku Maharani (died 16 August 1995)
- Tengku Zainal Mulok ibni Almarhum Sultan Ibrahim – Tengku Temenggong (died 25 April 1996)
- Tengku Iskandar Shah ibni Almarhum Sultan Ibrahim – Tengku Laksamana (died: unknown date)
- Tengku Nurulain binti Almarhum Sultan Ibrahim (died: unknown date)
- Tengku Maznah binti Almarhum Sultan Ibrahim (died: unknown date)
- Tengku Putra ibni Almarhum Sultan Ibrahim (died: unknown date)
- Tengku Badrol Alam ibni Almarhum Sultan Ibrahim (died: unknown date)
- Tengku Petri binti Almarhum Sultan Ibrahim (died: unknown date)
- Tengku Wok binti Almarhum Sultan Ibrahim (died: unknown date)
- Tengku Mastura binti Almarhum Sultan Ibrahim (died: unknown date)
- Tengku Shahariman ibni Almarhum Sultan Ibrahim (died: unknown date)
- Tengku Zainal Abidin ibni Sultan Abdullah (died: unknown date)
- Tengku Mariam binti Almarhum Sultan Yahya Petra (died: unknown date)
- Tengku Norzin binti Almarhum Sultan Yahya Petra (died: unknown date)
- Tengku Feissal ibni Almarhum Sultan Ibrahim – Tengku Kaya Perkasa (died 19 May 1997)
- Tengku Azizah binti Tengku Muhammad Hamzah (died 25 December 1999)
- Tengku Long Haniff bin Tengku Long Abdul Rahman (died 4 February 2003)
- Datin Nik Sharifah binti Hj. Nik Jaafar – Che’ Puan Kaya Perkasa (died 7 November 2008)
- Tengku Noor Asiah binti Tengku Ahmad (died 25 September 2013)
- Raja Aman Shah bin Raja Shahar Shah – Tengku Sri Kelana D’Raja (died 26 January 2018)
- Tengku Mohamad @ Tengku Aman Shah ibni Almarhum Sultan Ibrahim (died 16 August 2020)
- Tengku Abdul Aziz bin Tengku Muhammad Hamzah – Tengku Sri Utama Raja (died 20 September 2020)
- Tengku Merjan binti Almarhum Sultan Yahya Petra – Tengku Puan Sri Utama Raja (died 15 October 2020)
- Tengku Rohani binti Almarhum Sultan Yahya Petra (died 31 December 2021)
- Tengku Sulaiman Sharifaddin bin Tengku Mahmood Mahyideen (died 3 May 2022)
- Tengku Iskandar @ Tengku Kamarudin bin Tengku Abdul Hamid (died 11 December 2023)
- Datin Dr. Hjh. Nik Azizah binti Hj. Nik Yahya – Che’ Puan Sri Kelana D’Raja (died 13 December 2023)
- Tengku Ibrahim Farihaddin bin Tengku Feissal (died 30 November 2024)
- Tengku Mohamed ibni Almarhum Sultan Yahya Petra (died 8 June 2025)
- Tengku Salwani binti Almarhum Sultan Yahya Petra (died 17 August 2026)
- Tengku Rozan binti Almarhum Sultan Yahya Petra (died 24 October 2026)

== Non-leaders grave ==
- Dr Ali Othman Merican – Malay doctor (died 17 June 1945)
- Capt Dato' Khairi Mohamad – Pioneer civil aviator (died 12 November 2020)
- Dato' Dr Ahmad Barhanudin Mohamed – Malay dentist (died 26 February 2026)

== See also ==
- Sultan Abdul Samad Mausoleum, Bukit Jugra, Jugra, Kuala Langat, Selangor
- Shah Alam Royal Mausoleum, Shah Alam, Selangor
- Pahang Old Royal Mausoleum, Kampung Marhum, Kuala Pahang, Pekan, Pahang
- Al-Ghufran Royal Mausoleum, Kuala Kangsar, Perak
- Mahmoodiah Royal Mausoleum, Johor Bahru, Johor
- Seri Menanti Royal Mausoleum, Seri Menanti, Kuala Pilah, Negeri Sembilan
