= John Crawfurd =

British physician, colonial administrator, diplomat and writer (1783–1868)

The Honourable John Crawfurd FRS
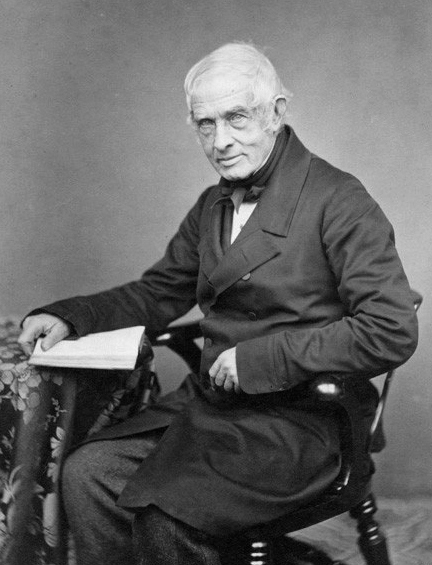
- Crawfurd in the 1850s

2nd Resident of Singapore
- In office 27 May 1823 – 15 August 1826
- Appointed by: Stamford Raffles
- Monarch: George IV
- Preceded by: William Farquhar
- Succeeded by: Position abolished Governor of the Straits Settlements

Personal details
- Born: 13 August 1783 Islay, Argyll, Scotland
- Died: 11 May 1868 (aged 84) South Kensington, London, England
- Spouse: Horatia Ann Perry (m. 1820; died 1855)
- Children: Margaret Campbell Crawfurd (daughter); Horatia Charlotte Campbell Crawfurd (daughter); Eleanor Charteris Crawfurd (daughter); Walter Crawfurd (son); Oswald John Frederick Crawfurd (son)
- Parents: Samuel Crawfurd (father); Margaret Campbell (mother)
- Education: University of Edinburgh
- Occupation: Colonial administrator
- Profession: Author; diplomat; physician

John Crawfurd FRS (13 August 1783 – 11 May 1868) was a Scottish physician, British colonial administrator, diplomat and writer who served as the second and last resident of Singapore.

== Early life ==
Crawfurd was born on Islay, in Argyll, Scotland, the son of Samuel Crawfurd, a physician, and Margaret Campbell; and was educated at the school in Bowmore. He followed his father's footsteps in the study of medicine and completed his medical course at the University of Edinburgh in 1803, at the age of 20.

Crawfurd joined the East India Company, as a Company surgeon, and was posted to India's Northwestern Provinces (now Uttar Pradesh), working in the area around Delhi and Agra from 1803 to 1808. He saw service in the campaigns of Baron Lake.

== Career ==
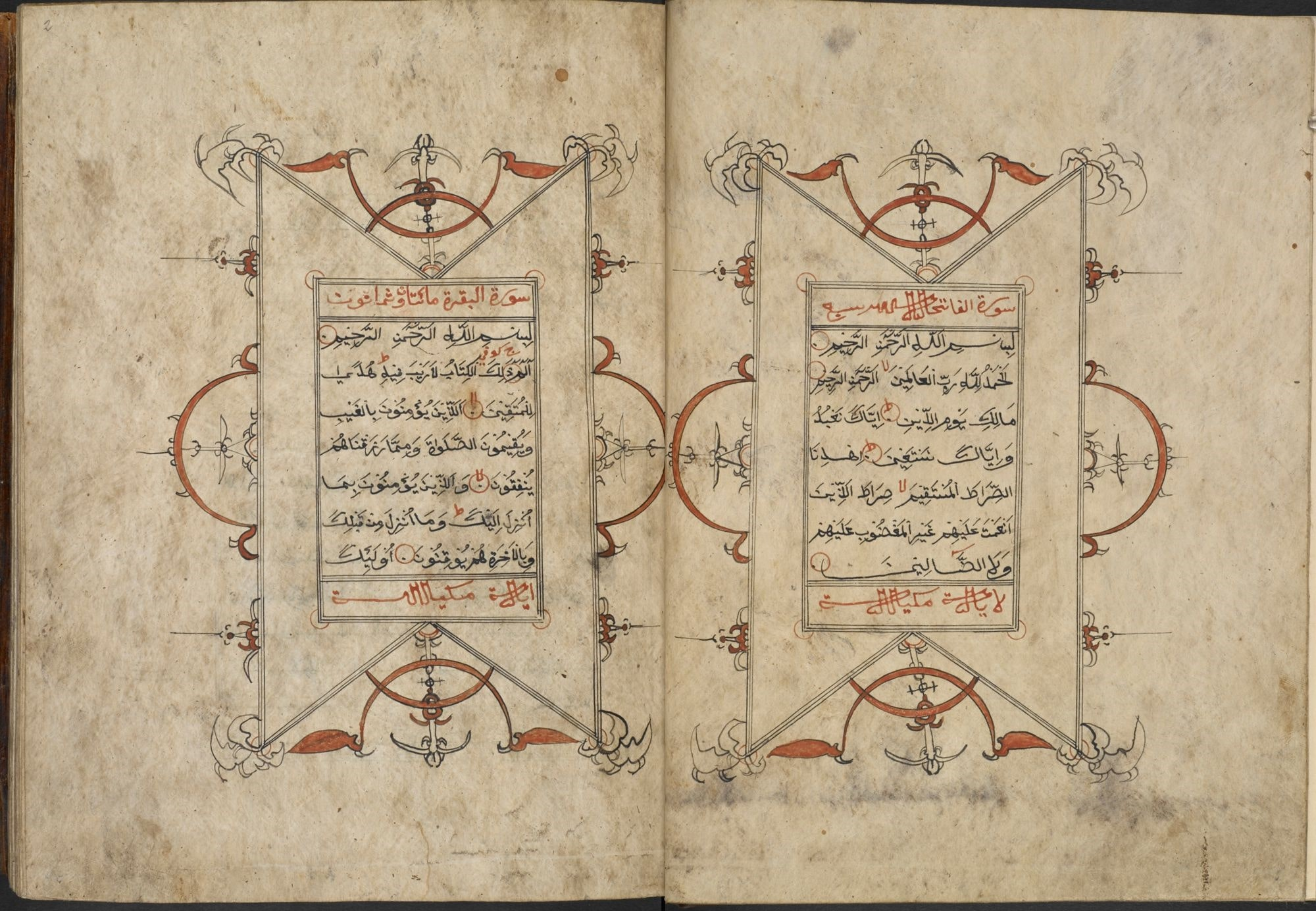
Opening pages from the Qur'an manuscript acquired by Crawfurd during his residency in Yogyakarta, which today is part of the British Library collection

Crawfurd was sent in 1808 to Penang, where he applied himself to the study of the Malay language and culture. In Penang, he met Stamford Raffles for the first time.

In 1811, Crawfurd accompanied Raffles on Lord Minto's Java Invasion, which overcame the Dutch. Raffles was appointed Lieutenant-Governor of Java by Minto during the 45-day operation, and Crawfurd was appointed the post of Resident Governor at the Court of Yogyakarta in November 1811. There he took a firm line against Sultan Hamengkubuwana II. The Sultan was encouraged by Pakubuwono IV of Surakarta to assume he had support in resisting the British; who sided with his opponents: his son, the Crown Prince, and Pangeran Natsukusuma. The Sultan's palace, the Kraton Ngayogyakarta Hadiningrat, was besieged and taken by British-led forces in June 1812.

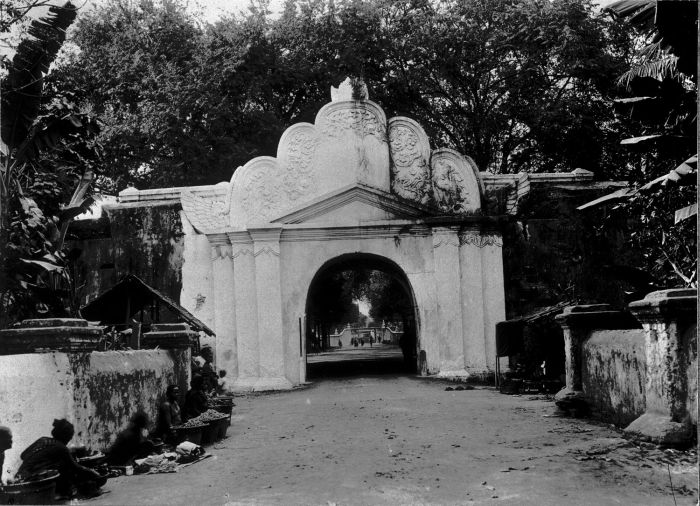
The kraton in Yogyakarta, a gate in a photograph from the early 20th century. The palace was made up of pendopo surrounded by a whitewashed wall.

As Resident, Crawfurd also pursued the study of the Javanese language, and cultivated personal relationships with Javanese aristocrats and literati. He was impressed by Javanese music.

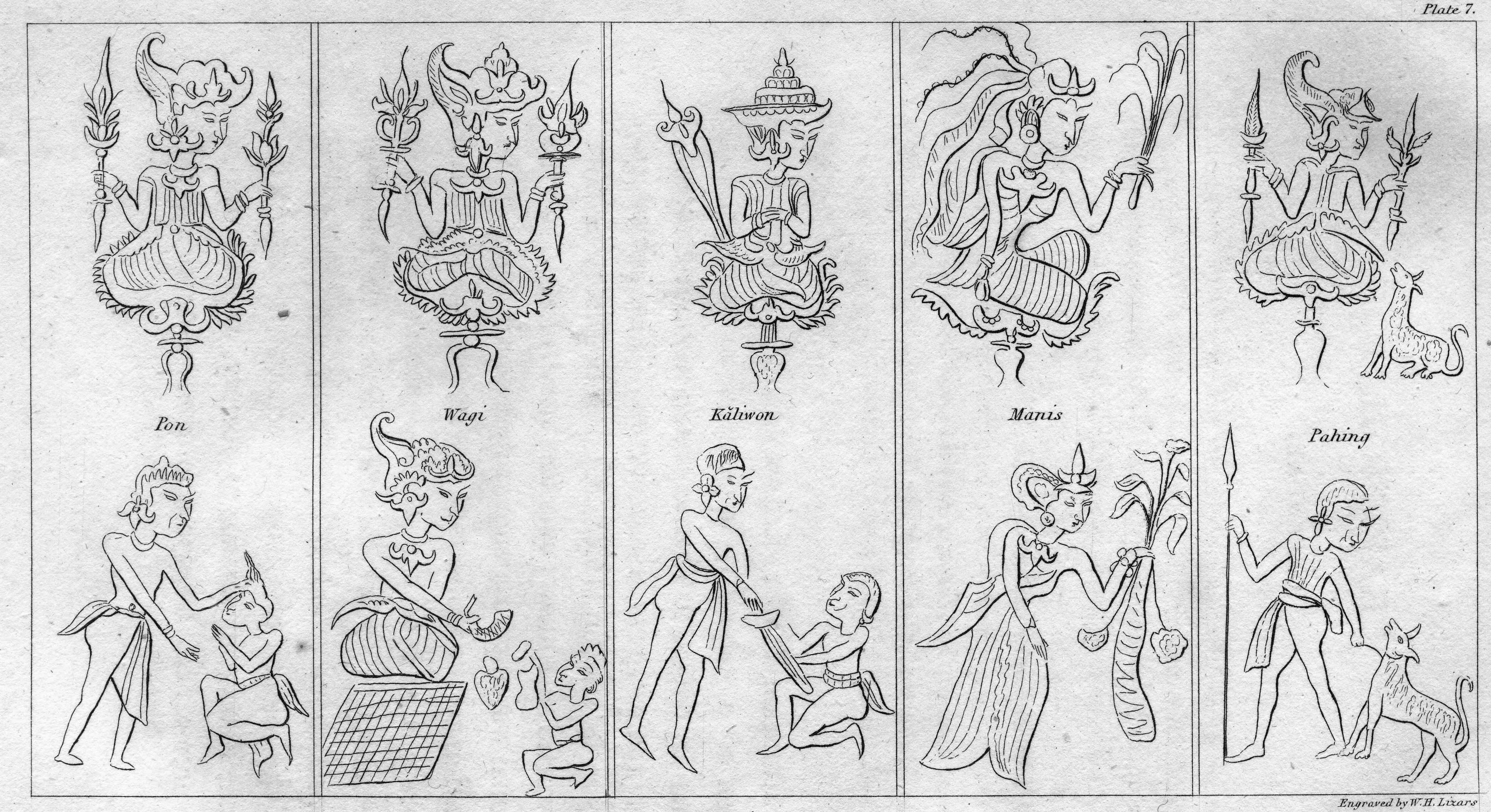
Javanese signs for the five days of the week, engraving by William Home Lizars from Crawfurd's History of the Indian Archipelago

Crawfurd was sent on diplomatic missions to Bali and the Celebes (now Sulawesi). His knowledge of the local culture supported Raffles's government in Java. Raffles, however, wanted to introduce land reform in the Cheribon residency. Crawfurd, with his experience of India and the zamindari, was a supporter of the "village system" of revenue collection. He opposed Raffles's attempts to introduce individual (ryotwari) settlement into Java.

=== Diplomat ===
Java was returned to the Dutch in 1816, and Crawfurd went back to England that year, shortly becoming a Fellow of the Royal Society, and turning to writing. Within a few years he was recalled to South-East Asia, as a diplomat; his missions were of limited obvious success.

==== Mission to Siam, Cochin China ====
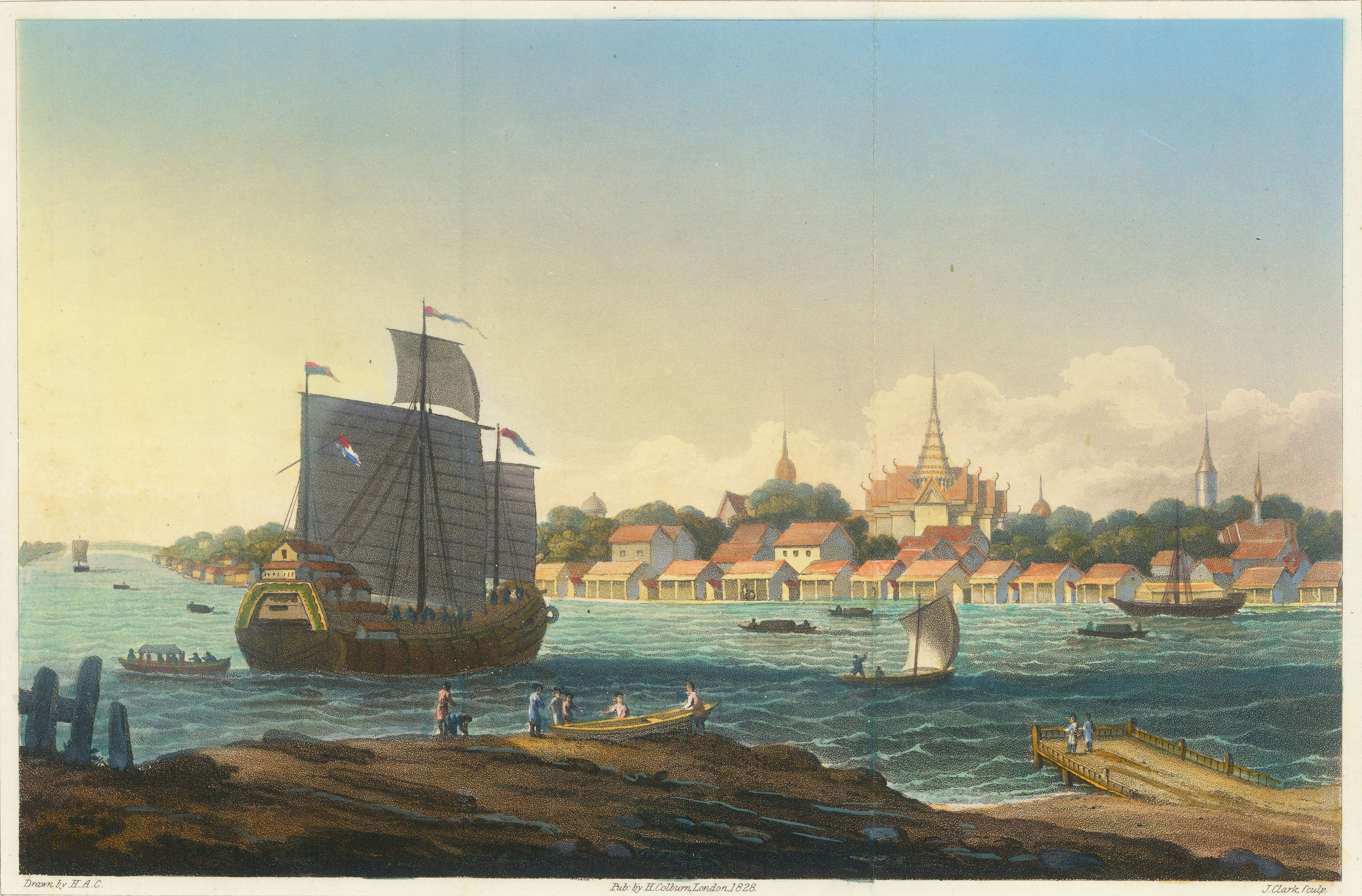
View of the city of Bangkok in 1828; from "Journal of an embassy from the governor-general of India to the courts of Siam and Cochin China"

In 1821, the then Governor-General of India, Lord Hastings, sent Crawfurd to the courts of Siam (now Thailand) and Cochinchina (now Vietnam). Lord Hastings was especially interested in learning more about Siamese policy with regard to the northern Malay states, and Cochinchina's policy with regard to French efforts to establish a presence in Asia. Crawfurd travelled with notes from Horace Hayman Wilson on Buddhism, as it was understood at the time. Captain Dangerfield of the Indian army, a skilful astronomer, surveyor and geologist, served as assistant; Lieutenant Rutherford commanded thirty Sepoys; noted naturalist George Finlayson served as medical officer. Mrs. Crawfurd accompanied the Mission.

On 21 November 1821, the mission embarked on the John Adam for the complicated and difficult navigation of the Hoogly River, taking seven days to sail the 140 miles (225 km) from Calcutta to open water. Crawfurd writes that, with the assistance of a steam-boat, ships might be towed down in two days without difficulty; then adds in a footnote: "The first steam-vessel used in India, was built about three years after this passage was written...."

The John Adam proceeded on what would be the first official visit to Siam since the resurgence of Siam following the 1767 Fall of Ayutthaya. Crawfurd soon found the court of King Rama II still embroiled in the aftermath of the Burmese–Siamese War of 1809–1812. On 8 December 1821, near Papra Strait (modern Pak Prah Strait north of Thalang District) Crawfurd found fishermen "in a state of perpetual distrust and insecurity" due to territorial disputes between hostile Burmans and Siamese. On 11 December, after entering the Straits of Malacca and arriving at Penang Island, he found the settlements of Penang and Queda in a state of alarm. Sultan Ahmad Tajuddin Halim Shah II of Kedah, had fled the Rajah of Ligor (modern Nakhon Si Thammarat) to claim right of asylum at Prince of Wales's Island (modern Penang). British claims to the island was based upon payment of a quit-rent accordant with European feudal law, which Crawfurd feared the Siamese would challenge.

Crawfurd's journal entry for 1 April 1822, notes that the Siamese, for their part, were especially interested in the acquisition of arms. Pointedly questioned in this regard in an urgent private meeting with the Prah-klang (Prayurawongse), the reply was, "that if the Siamese were at peace with the friends and neighbours of the British nation, they would certainly be permitted to purchase fire-arms and ammunition at our ports, but not otherwise." On 19 May, a Chief of Lao (Chao Anu, a king in what is now Laos and soon-to-be rebel) met with Crawfurd, a first diplomatic contact for the UK. This visit was despite the isolation into which the mission had fallen. A Vietnamese embassy had arrived not long before, and tensions were high. Since Crawford's brief had opposed the interests of court figures including the Raja of Ligor and Nangklao, there was little prospect of success. By October relations were at a low ebb. Crawfurd moved on to Saigon, but Minh Mạng refused to see him.

==== Resident of Singapore ====
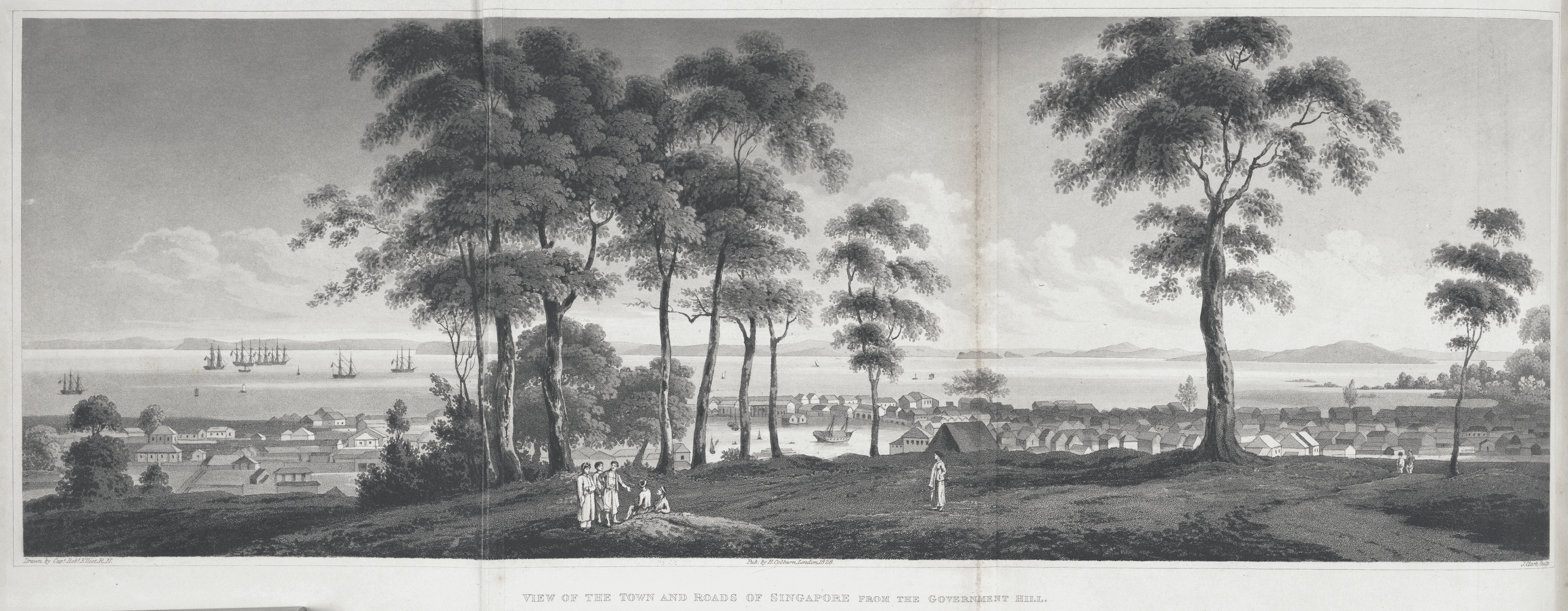
View of the town and roads of Singapore from the government hill

Crawfurd was appointed British Resident of Singapore in March 1823. He was under orders to reduce the expenditure on the existing factory there, but instead responded to local commercial representations, and spent money on reclamation work on the river. He also concluded the final agreement between the East India Company, and Sultan Hussein Shah of Johor with the Temenggong, on the status of Singapore on 2 August 1824. It was the culmination of negotiations started by Raffles in 1819, and the agreement is now sometimes called the Crawfurd Treaty. He also had input into the Anglo-Dutch Treaty of 1824 dealing with spheres of influence in the East Indies.

Crawfurd was on familiar terms with Munshi Abdullah. He edited and contributed to the Singapore Chronicle of Francis James Bernard, the first local newspaper that initially appeared dated 1 January 1824. Crawford Street [sic] and Crawford Bridge [sic] in Singapore are named after him.

==== Burma mission ====
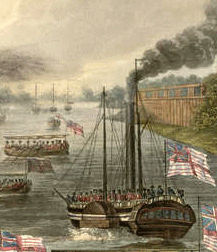
The Diana

Crawfurd was sent on another envoy mission to Burma in 1826, by Hastings's successor Lord Amherst, in the aftermath of the First Anglo-Burmese War. It was to be his last political service for the Company. The party included Adoniram Judson as interpreter and Nathaniel Wallich as botanist. Crawfurd's journey to Ava up the River Irrawaddy was by paddle steamer, the Diana: it had been hired by the East India Company for the war, where it had seen action and travelled 400 miles up the Irrawaddy. There were five local boats, and soldiers making up a party of over 50.

Crawfurd at the court found Bagyidaw temporising despite a weak position with the British forces in Arakan and Tenasserim. The king conceded only a trade agreement, in return for a delay in indemnity payments; and sent his own mission to Calcutta.

The expedition fortuitously was delayed on the return journey for repairs. Crawfurd collected significant fossils, north of Magwe on the left bank of the river, in seven chests. Back in London, William Clift identified a new species of mastodon (more accurately Stegolophodon) from them; Hugh Falconer also worked on the collection. The finds, of fossil bones and wood, were discussed further in a paper by William Buckland, giving details; and they brought Crawfurd the friendship of Roderick Murchison, Foreign Secretary of the Geological Society. There were also collected 18,000 botanical specimens, many of which went to the Calcutta Botanic Garden.

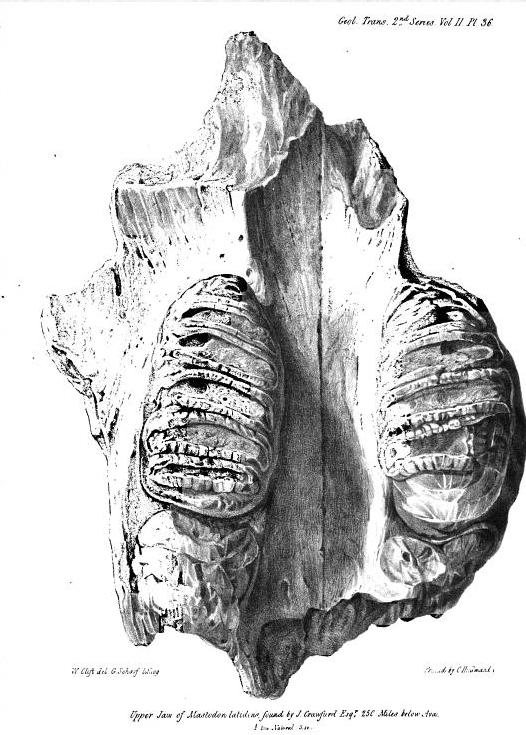
Jaw collected by John Crawfurd near Yenangyaung in Burma, now a type specimen for Stegolophodon latidens. Plate 36 of the original paper by William Clift.

=== Political career ===
Returning to the United Kingdom, Crawfurd spent around 40 years in varied activities. He wrote as an orientalist, geographer and ethnologist. He tried parliamentary politics, without success; he agitated for free trade; and he was a publicist for and against colonisation schemes, in line with his views. He also represented the interests of British traders based in Singapore and Calcutta.

==== Radical parliamentary candidate ====
Crawfurd made several unsuccessful attempts to enter the British Parliament in the 1830s. His campaign literature featured universal suffrage and the secret ballot, free trade and opposition to monopolies, public education and reduction of military spending, and opposition to regressive taxation and the taxation of Dissenters for a state church, with nationalisation of Church of England properties. He joined the Parliamentary Candidate Society, founded by Thomas Erskine Perry (his brother-in-law), to promote "fit and proper" Members of Parliament. He also joined the Radical Club, a breakaway from the National Political Union founded in 1833 by William Wallis.

Crawfurd unsuccessfully contested, as an advanced radical, Glasgow in 1832, Paisley in 1834, Stirling Burghs in 1835, and Preston in 1837. At Glasgow he polled fourth (there were two MPs for the borough), with Sir Daniel Sandford third. In March 1834 it was Sandford who was elected at Paisley. Alexander's East India and Colonial Magazine struck a note of regret after his defeat at Stirling Burghs.

On 31 January 1834 Crawfurd supported Thomas Perronet Thompson in a meeting agitating against the Corn Laws. Thomas Carlyle alluded, in notes on one of Jane Welsh Carlyle's letters, to Crawfurd speaking at a radical meeting at the London Tavern set up by Charles Buller on 21 November 1834; in which he showed much more originality than John Arthur Roebuck, but lost his thread.

In Preston in the 1837 general election Crawfurd had the Liberal nomination in a three-cornered fight for two seats, as Peter Hesketh-Fleetwood was regarded as a waverer by the Conservatives who ran Robert Townley Parker against him; but he polled third. He also supported John Temple Leader's candidacy at Westminster against Sir Francis Burdett, being deputy chairman on his election committee (with Thomas Prout, chairman Sir Ronald Craufurd Ferguson). Crawfurd spoke with George Grote at a meeting for Leader at the Belgrave Hotel.

==== Free trader ====
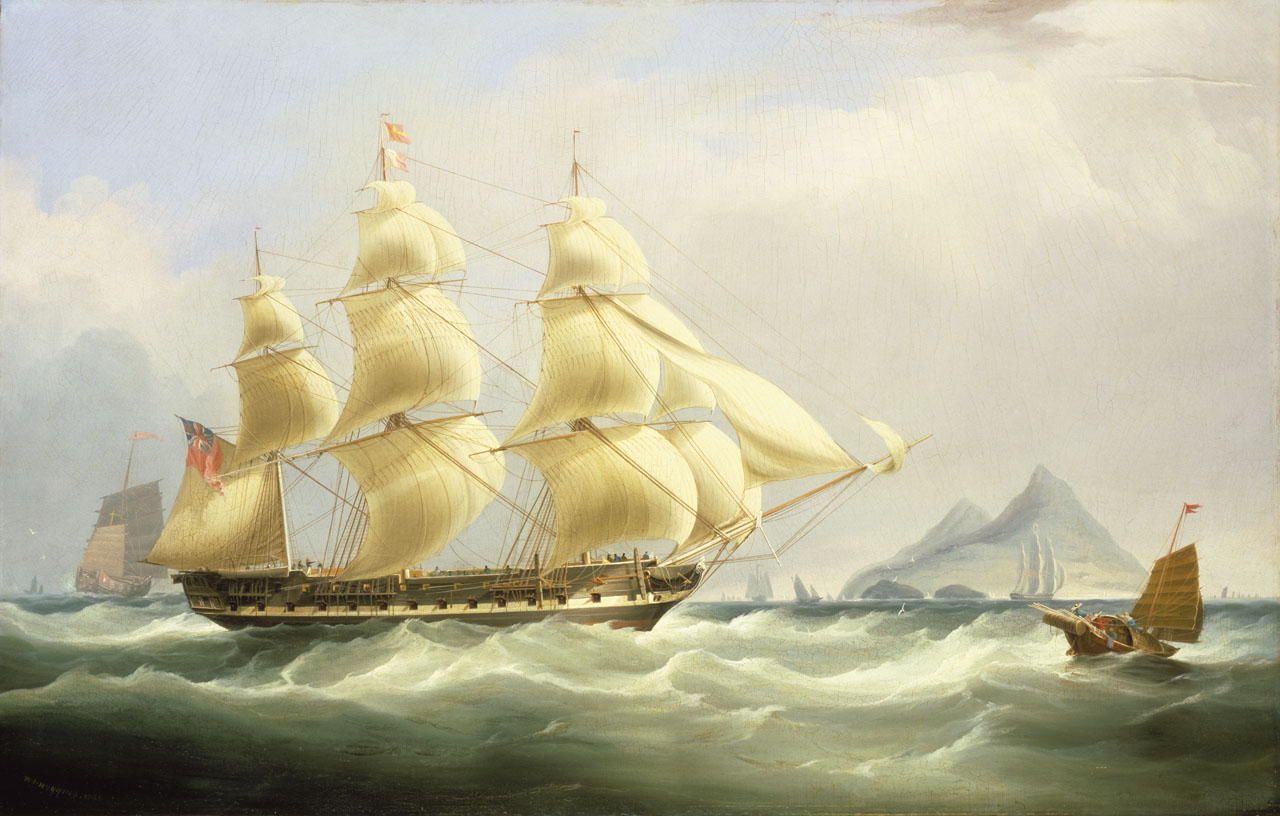
East Indiaman Asia, 1836 painting by William John Huggins

A lifelong advocate of free trade policies, in A View of the Present State and Future Prospects of the Free Trade and Colonization of India (1829), Crawfurd made an extended case against the East India Company's approach, in particular in excluding British entrepreneurs, and in failing to develop Indian cotton. He had had experience in Java of the export possibilities for cotton textiles. He then gave evidence in March 1830 to a parliamentary committee, on the East India Company's monopoly of trade with China. Robert Montgomery Martin criticised Crawfurd, and the evidence of Robert Rickards, an ex-employee of the Company, for exaggerating the financial burden of the monopoly on tea. Crawfurd put out a pamphlet, Chinese Monopoly Examined. Ross Donnelly Mangles defended the East India Company in 1830, in an answer addressed to Rickards and Crawfurd. When the Company's charter came up for renewal in 1833, the China trade monopoly was broken. Crawfurd's part as parliamentary agent for interests in Calcutta had been paid (at £1500 per year); his publicity work had included facts for an Edinburgh Review article written by another author.

==== Colonisation of Australia ====
In reviewing Edward Gibbon Wakefield's New British Province of South Australia, and subsequent writing in the Westminster Review, Crawfurd gave an opinion against systematic colonisation. He considered that abundant land and individual enterprise were the necessary elements. Robert Torrens, who floated the South Australian Land Company, replied to the Westminster Review line in Colonization of South Australia (1835). Part I of the book is a Letter to Crawfurd.

In 1843 Crawfurd gave evidence to the Colonial Office on Port Essington, on the north coast of Australia, to the effect that its climate made it unsuitable for settlement. He returned to the topic in a debate in 1858 on settlements on the Victoria River, as had been suggested by Sir George Everest. He generally opposed Sir Roderick Murchison's promotion of European colonisation of Australia, as far as it applied to the north coast.

==== Lobbyist for South and South-East Asia ====
When the Stamp Act 1827 was passed, meaning that all public documents in India would have to pay a stamp tax (including newspapers as well as legal documents), Crawfurd was hired as London agent for a group of British merchants in Calcutta opposing the legislation. Crawfurd involved Joseph Hume, and he obtained newspaper coverage for his cause, including in The Examiner where the precedents from America were cited. He also wrote pamphlets himself, in which he advocated an end to the East India Company monopoly, and European colonisation. These moves occurred in 1828–9; in 1830 Crawfurd approached William Huskisson directly. His lobbying continued with the free trade issues mentioned above. Inquiry into the System of Taxation in India, Letters on the Interior of India, an attack on the newspaper stamp-tax and the duty on paper entitled Taxes on Knowledge (1836) is a related work.

In 1855 Crawfurd went with a delegation to the Board of Control of the East India Company, with representations on behalf of the Straits dollar as an independent currency. Crawfurd lobbied in both Houses of Parliament, with George Keppel, 6th Earl of Albemarle acting to bring a petition to the Lords, and William Ewart Gladstone putting the case in the Commons. Among the arguments put was that the dollar was a decimal currency, while the rupee used by traders, and legal tender in East India Company territories since it was coined in 1835, was not. In 1856 a Bill to change the status quo on coins minted and issued from India was defeated.

In 1868 Crawfurd with James Guthrie and William Paterson formed the Straits Settlements Association, to protect the colony's interests. Crawfurd was its first President.

== Works ==
Crawfurd wrote prolifically. His views have been seen as inconsistent: a recent author wrote that "[...] Crawfurd seemed to embody a complex mixture of elements of coexisting but ultimately contradictory value systems". A comment about "hasty general opinions from a few instances", by George Bennett on the topic of Papuan people, has been taken to be aimed at Crawfurd.

His 1822 work "Malay of Champa" contains a vocabulary of the Cham language.

=== Diplomat and traveller ===
In retirement after the Burmese mission, Crawfurd wrote books and papers on Eastern subjects. His envoy experiences from missions were written up in Journals in 1828 and 1829. This documentation was reprinted nearly 140 years later by Oxford University Press.

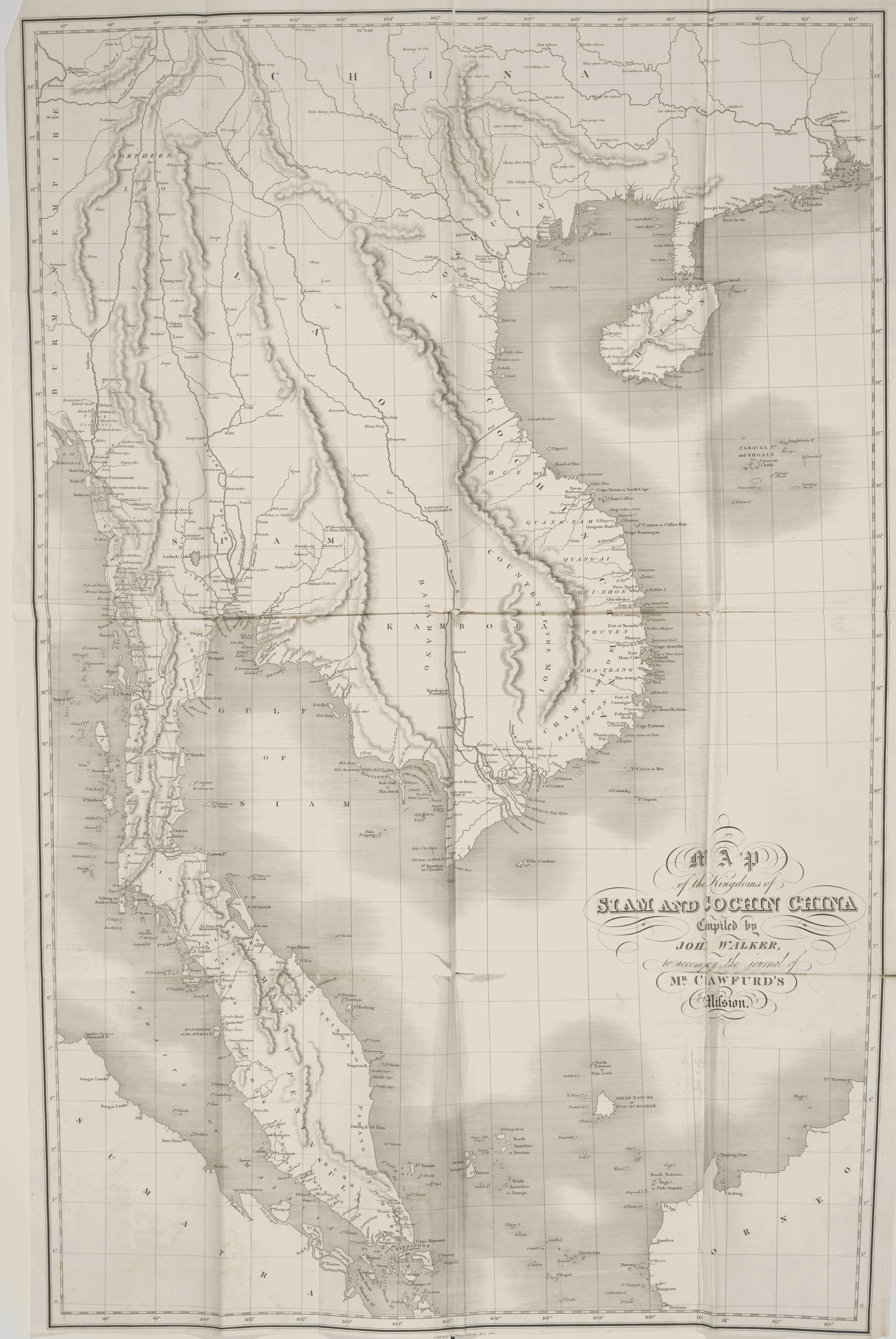
Map from Embassy to the Courts of Siam and Cochin-China

- Journal of an Embassy to the Court of Ava in 1827 (1829)
- Journal of an Embassy to the Courts of Siam and Cochin-China, exhibiting a view of the actual State of these Kingdoms (1830)
- Descriptive Dictionary of the Indian Islands and Adjacent Countries (1856)
- Crawfurd, John (1830). Journal of an embassy from the governor-general of India to the courts of Siam and Cochin China: exhibiting a view of the actual state of those kingdoms. H. Colburn and R. Bentley.

=== Historian ===
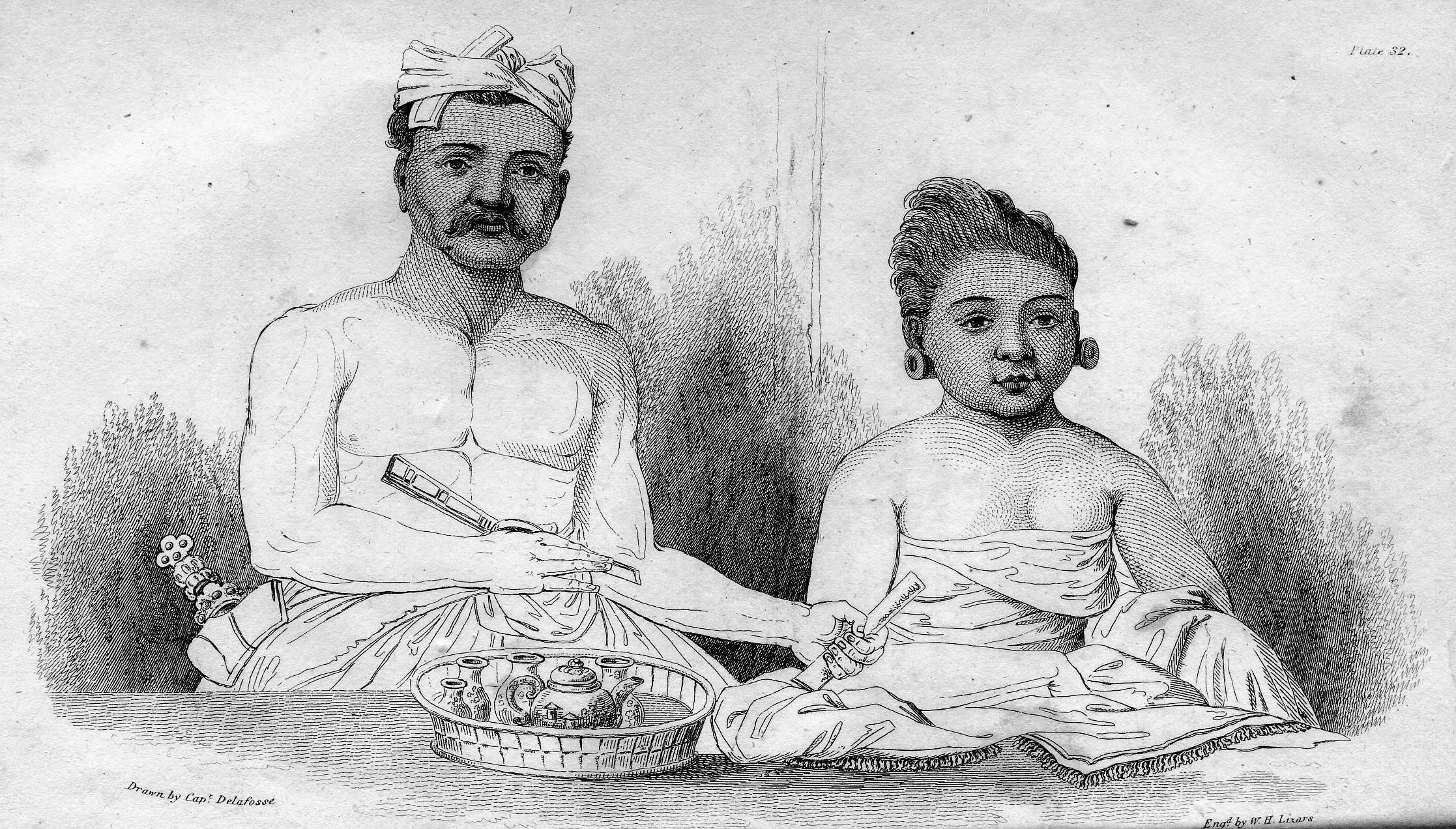
Engraving of the Rajah of Buleleng, from Crawfurd's History of the Indian Archipelago, vol. 3

According to Jane Rendall's concept of "Scottish orientalism", Crawfurd is a historian of the second generation. His History of the Indian Archipelago (1820), in three volumes, was his major work. Crawfurd was a critic of much of what the European nations had done in the area of Asia he covered.

An Historical and Descriptive Account of China (1836) was a joint work in three volumes from the Edinburgh Cabinet Library, with Hugh Murray, Peter Gordon, Thomas Lynn, William Wallace, and Gilbert Thomas Burnett.

=== Orientalist ===
- Grammar and Dictionary of the Malay Language (1852)

Crawfurd and Colin Mackenzie collected manuscripts from the capture of Yogyakarta, and some of these are now in the British Library.

Crawfurd claimed Cham for the Austronesian languages. His suggestion met no favour at the time, but scholars from around 1950 onwards came to agree.

=== Economist ===
Crawfurd held strong views on what he saw as the backwardness of the economy of India of his time. He attributed it to the weakness of Indian financial institutions, compared to Europe. His opinions were in an anonymous pamphlet A Sketch of the Commercial Resources and Monetary and Mercantile System of British India (1837) now attributed to him. Like Robert Montgomery Martin, he saw India primarily as a source of raw materials, and advocated investment based on that direction. A harsh critic of the existing Calcutta agencies, he noted the absence of bill broking in India and suggested that an exchange bank should be set up.

His view that an economy dominated by agriculture was inevitably an absolute government was cited by Samuel Taylor Coleridge, in his On the Constitution of the Church and State.

=== Ethnologist ===
While Crawfurd produced work that was ethnological in nature over a period of half a century, the term "ethnology" had not even been coined when he began to write. Attention has been drawn to his latest work, from the 1860s, which was copious, much criticised at the time, and which has also been scrutinised in the 21st century, as detailed below.

==== Polygenist ====
Crawfurd held polygenist views, based on multiple origins of human groups; and these earned him, according to Sir John Bowring, the nickname "the inventor of forty Adams". In The Descent of Man by Charles Darwin, Crawfurd is cited as believing in 60 races. He expressed these views to the Ethnological Society of London (ESL), a traditional stronghold of monogenism (belief in a unified origin of humankind) where he had come in 1861 to hold office as President.

Crawfurd believed in different races as separate creations by God in specific regional zones, with separate origins for languages, and possibly as different species. With Robert Gordon Latham of the ESL, he also opposed strongly the ideas of Max Müller on an original Aryan race.

==== Papers of the 1860s ====
Crawfurd wrote in 1861 in the Transactions of the ESL a paper On the Conditions Which Favour, Retard, and Obstruct the Early Civilization of Man, in which he argued for deficiencies in the science and technology of Asia. In On the Numerals as Evidence of the Progress of Civilization (1863) he argued that the social condition of a people correlates with the numeral words of their language. Crawfurd used domestication frequently as a metaphor. His racist views on black people were laughed at, during the British Association meeting at Birmingham in 1865.

A paper by Crawfurd, On the Physical and Mental Characteristics of European and Asian Races of Man, given 13 February 1866, argued for the superiority of Europeans. It particularly laid emphasis on European military dominance as evidence. Its thesis was directly contradicted at a meeting of the Society some weeks later, by Dadabhai Naoroji.

==== Analyses of Crawfurd's Racial Views ====
Analyses since the 1990s have sought to clarify Crawfurd's agenda in his writings on race at this time, when he had become prominent in a young and still fluid field and discipline. Ellingson demonstrates Crawfurd's role in promoting the idea of the noble savage in service of racial ideology. Trosper has taken Ellingson's analysis a step further, attributing to Crawfurd a conscious "spin" put on the idea of primitive culture, a rhetorically sophisticated use of a "straw man" fallacy, achieved by bringing in, irrelevantly but for the sake of incongruity, the figure of Jean-Jacques Rousseau.

Crawfurd dedicated considerable effort to a critique of Darwin's theories of human evolution; as a proponent of polygenism, who believed that human races did not share common ancestors, Crawfurd was an early and prominent critic of Darwin's ideas. Right at the end of his life, in 1868, Crawfurd was using a "missing link" argument against Sir John Lubbock, in what Ellingson describes as a misrepresentation of a Darwinist viewpoint based on the idea that a precursor of humans must still be extant.

Ellingson points to a 1781 work of William Falconer, On the Influence of Climate, with an attack on Rousseau, as a possible source of Crawfurd's thinking; while also pointing out some differences. Ellingson also places Crawfurd in a British group among those of his period whose anthropological views not only turned on race, but who also drew conclusions of superiority from those views, others being Luke Burke, James Hunt, Robert Knox, and Kenneth R. H. Mackenzie.

Crawfurd's attitudes were not, however, based on human skin colour; and he was an opponent of slavery, having written an article "Sugar without Slavery" with Thomas Perronet Thompson in 1833 in the Westminster Review. In dismissing Crawfurd's notes and suggestions on his work as "quite unimportant", Charles Darwin identified Crawfurd's racial views as "Pallasian", i.e. the analogue for humankind of the theories of Peter Simon Pallas.

The predominant approach in the ESL went back to James Cowles Prichard. In the view of Thomas Trautmann, in Crawfurd's attack on the Aryan theory there is a final rejection of the "languages and nations" approach, which was Prichard's, and a consequent freeing of (polygenist) racial theory.

== Personal life ==
Crawfurd married Horatia Ann, daughter of James Perry. From 1821 to 1822, Mrs. Crawfurd had accompanied the Mission to Siam and Cochin China aboard the John Adam. As the ship made way from Bangkok to Hué, Mrs. Crawfurd went ashore on an island in the Gulf of Siam, where she made a considerable impression upon the natives. The writer Oswald John Frederick Crawfurd, born in 1834, was their son.

Crawfurd was elected President of the Ethnological Society in 1861.

Crawfurd died at his home in Elvaston Place, South Kensington, London on 11 May 1868 at the age of 85.

== Bibliography ==
- Adas, Michael (1990). Machines as the Measure of Men: Science, Technology, and Ideologies of Western Dominance. Cornell University Press. ISBN 0-8014-9760-4.
- Beasley, Edward (2010). The Victorian Reinvention of Race: New Racisms and the Problem of Grouping in the Human Sciences. Taylor & Francis. ISBN 978-0-203-84498-4.
- Crawfurd, John (21 August 2006) [originally published 1828]. Journal of an Embassy from the Governor-general of India to the Courts of Siam and Cochin China. Vol. 2 (2nd ed.). London: H. Colburn and R. Bentley. OCLC 03452414.
- Ellingson, Terry Jay (2001). The Myth of the Noble Savage. University of California Press. ISBN 0520925920.
- Kling, Blair B. (1976). Partner in Empire: Dwarkanath Tagore and the Age of Enterprise in Eastern India. University of California Press. p. 71. ISBN 978-0-520-02927-9.
- Stafford, Robert A. (2002). Scientist of Empire: Sir Roderick Murchison, Scientific Exploration and Victorian Imperialism. Cambridge University Press. ISBN 978-0-521-52867-2.
- Knapman, Gareth (2017). Race and British Colonialism in South-East Asia: John Crawfurd and the politics of equality. Routledge. ISBN 9781138211766

Political offices
Preceded by Major-Gen. William Farquhar	Resident of Singapore; 1823 – 1826	Abolished; Replaced by Governor of the Straits Settlements
