= Mary Burnett =

Mary Burnett may refer to:

- Mary Ann Burnett (?–1856), British botanist, author, and editor
- Mary Burnett Talbert (1866–1923), née Burnett, American orator, activist, suffragist, and reformer
- Mary Couts Burnett (1856–1924), American philanthropist
- Mary Priscilla Burnett, birth name of Priscilla Ransohoff (1912–1992), American military education specialist and advocate
