= Congalton =

Congalton is a surname of Scottish origin. Notable people with the surname include:

- Bunk Congalton (1875–1937), Canadian baseball player
- James de Congalton Hepburn (1878–1955), Canadian politician
- Jimmy Congalton (1879–1947), Canadian curler
- Samuel Congalton (1796–1850), Scottish sailor
