= Edinburgh Cabinet Library =

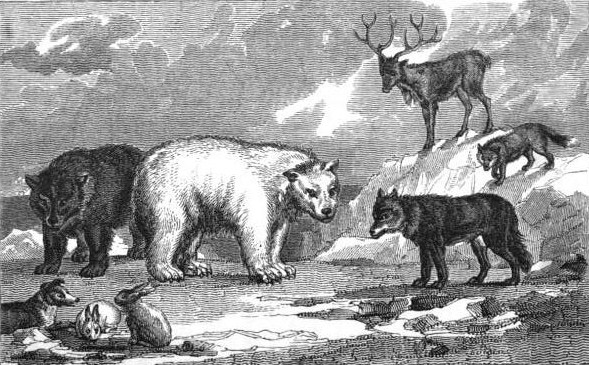
Arctic animals, illustration from Volume 1 of the Edinburgh Cabinet Library

The Edinburgh Cabinet Library was a series of 38 books, mostly geographical, published from 1830 to 1844, and edited by Dionysius Lardner. The original price was 5 shillings for a volume; a later reissue of 30 of the volumes was at half that price. The series was published jointly by Oliver and Boyd in Edinburgh, and Simpkin & Marshall in London, and in the years 1848 to 1851 was published in a new edition by Thomas Nelson & Sons.

Number	Year	Author	Title
1	1830	Sir John Leslie and Hugh Murray	Discovery and Adventure in the Polar Seas and Regions
2	1830	Murray, Robert Jameson and James Wilson	Narrative of Discovery and Adventure in Africa, from the Earliest Ages to the Present Time: with illustrations of the geology, mineralogy, and zoology
3	1831	Michael Russell	Ancient and Modern Egypt
4	1831	Russell	Palestine
5	1831	Christian Isobel Johnstone	Lives and Voyages of Drake, Cavendish, and Dampier, including a History of the Buccaneers
6, 7, 8	1832	Hugh Murray	Historical and Descriptive Account of British India
10	1832	William MacGillivray	Travels of A. von Humboldt
11	1833	Patrick Fraser Tytler	Life of Walter Raleigh
12	1833	Russell	Nubia and Abyssinia
13, 14	1833	Andrew Crichton	History of Arabia
15	1834	James Baillie Fraser	An Historical and Descriptive Account of Persia
16	1834	MacGillivray	Lives of Eminent Zoologists, from Aristotle to Linnæus
17	1835	Russell	The Barbary States
18, 19, 20	1836	Murray, John Crawfurd, Peter Gordon, Thomas Lynn, William Wallace, and Gilbert Thomas Burnett	An Historical and Descriptive Account of China
21	1836	Anonymous	Circumnavigation: Magellan to Cook
22	1837	Tytler	Life of Henry the Eighth
23, 24	1838	Crichton with Henry Wheaton	Scandinavia, Ancient and Modern
25, 26, 27	1839	Murray, Wilson, Robert Kaye Greville, Thomas Stewart Traill	An Historical and Descriptive Account of British America
28	1840	Anonymous (James Nicol according to the 1844 edition)	An Historical and Descriptive Account of Iceland, Greenland, and the Faroe Isles
29, 30, 31	1841	William Spalding	Italy and the Italian Islands
32	1841	Fraser	Mesopotamia and Assyria
33	1842	Russell	Polynesia
34	1843	Anonymous	Voyages around the World
35, 36, 37	1844	Murray, natural history by James Nicol	United States
38	1844	Murray	Travels of Marco Polo
