= Oswald Crawfurd =

British journalist and diplomat (1834–1909)

Oswald Crawfurd CMG
- Born: Oswald John Frederick Crawfurd; 18 March 1834; London, England
- Died: 31 January 1909 (aged 74); Montreux, Switzerland
- Education: Eton College; Merton College, Oxford (no degree)
- Occupations: Journalist; man of letters; diplomat
- Spouses: Margaret Ford (died 1899); Lita Browne (m. 1902)
- Children: 1
- Writing career
- Pen name: John Dangerfield

Oswald John Frederick Crawfurd CMG (18 March 1834 – 31 January 1909) was a British journalist, man of letters and diplomat. He served over 24 years as British consul in Porto, Portugal.

== Career ==
Oswald John Frederick Crawfurd was born at Wilton Crescent, London, on 18 March 1834. He was the son of John Crawfurd, diplomat, and Horatia Ann Perry. He was educated at Eton College, he matriculated at Merton College, Oxford, in 1854, but left the university without a degree.

In 1867 he became a clerk in the Foreign Office and was subsequently promoted to be H.M.'s consul at Porto, Portugal. In 1873 Crawfurd founded the New Quarterly Magazine, which he sold to Francis Hueffer in 1877. He was made a Companion of the Order of St Michael and St George in the 1890 New Year Honours.

Crawfurd's last two years in Portugal were of exceptional difficulty. An ultimatum from Lord Salisbury in January 1890, the result of the occupation by Portuguese troops of British territory in East Africa, led to an outburst of anti-British feeling, more violent in Porto than in other Portuguese towns. Crawfurd's house was stoned, but he carried on his duties till the trouble subsided, and then on 17 June 1891 he resigned and returned to England.

Crawfurd become editor and director of Black and White, managing director of Chapman & Hall, and editor of Chapman's Magazine of Fiction from 1895 to 1898.

He wrote 13 novels (of minor reputation) and contributed articles to the Fortnightly Review, Cornhill Magazine, Nineteenth Century, and the New Review. He died at Montreux, Switzerland on 31 January 1909.

== Family ==
Oswald Crawfurd was the youngest son and last (4th) child of John Crawfurd, who played an important role in the founding of Singapore. Oswald's first marriage was to Margaret "Meta" Ford, the daughter of the writer Richard Ford, with whom he had one son who died in infancy. His first wife died in 1899.

He remarried at the English Church in Paris on 18 September 1902 to Lita Browne, daughter of Hermann von Flesch Brunnigen, an Imperial Counsellor at Vienna. (Note: Hermann von Flesch Brunnigen was also the father of Helena Regina Frederica von Flesch Brunnigen, who married Cecil Marcus Knatchbull-Hugessen, 4th Baron Brabourne.)

== See also ==
- Cecil Knatchbull-Hugessen, 4th Baron Brabourne – English cricketer and British peer (1863–1933)
