= Scottish orientalism =

Scottish orientalism refers to the collective views of a group of Scottish scholars of oriental languages, informed by the Scottish Enlightenment, and applied to the culture and administration of the Indian subcontinent though the East India Company, from the end of the 18th century to the middle of the 19th century.

The word "orientalist" is recorded in English from 1779. In its early days and in relation to India (rather than the Ottoman possessions) it connoted not only proficiency in languages of India, but also study of the culture, and advocacy of administration of the existing legal systems and customs. This attitude was opposed by both evangelical and Utilitarian critics.

== Background ==
Scottish dominance within British orientalism at the end of the 18th century—the period after the death of Sir William Jones in 1794—was almost complete: the only leading exception was Henry Thomas Colebrooke.

== Rendall's theory ==
Rendall has identified a group of Scottish oriental scholars, under the influence of Dugald Stewart and his view of "philosophical history". They bridge the gap between William Robertson who warned of the ethnocentrism into which the approach of stadial history could betray Europeans, and James Mill who in The History of British India embraced the assumption of European superiority, in the case of Hindu culture. These men all had contact with Edinburgh University, and comprise:

- John Crawfurd
- Mountstuart Elphinstone
- William Erskine
- Alexander Hamilton
- Vans Kennedy
- John Leyden
- James Mackintosh.
- Alexander Murray

== Orientalism in government ==
Michael Fry has argued that there was a "Scottish orientalist regime", including Elphinstone. The views of Scottish administrators derived from the contemporary Moderate church party, and Scottish intellectuals including Robertson and Adam Ferguson, leading to an accepting line on Indian custom and culture.

== In literature ==
Strong sympathy for Indians was shown in the 1796 novel Translations of the Letters of a Hindoo Rajah (1796) by Elizabeth Hamilton, sister of the orientalist Charles Hamilton. The family was Scots-Irish.

== See also ==
- Category:Scottish orientalists
