= Mary Ann Burnett =

British botanist

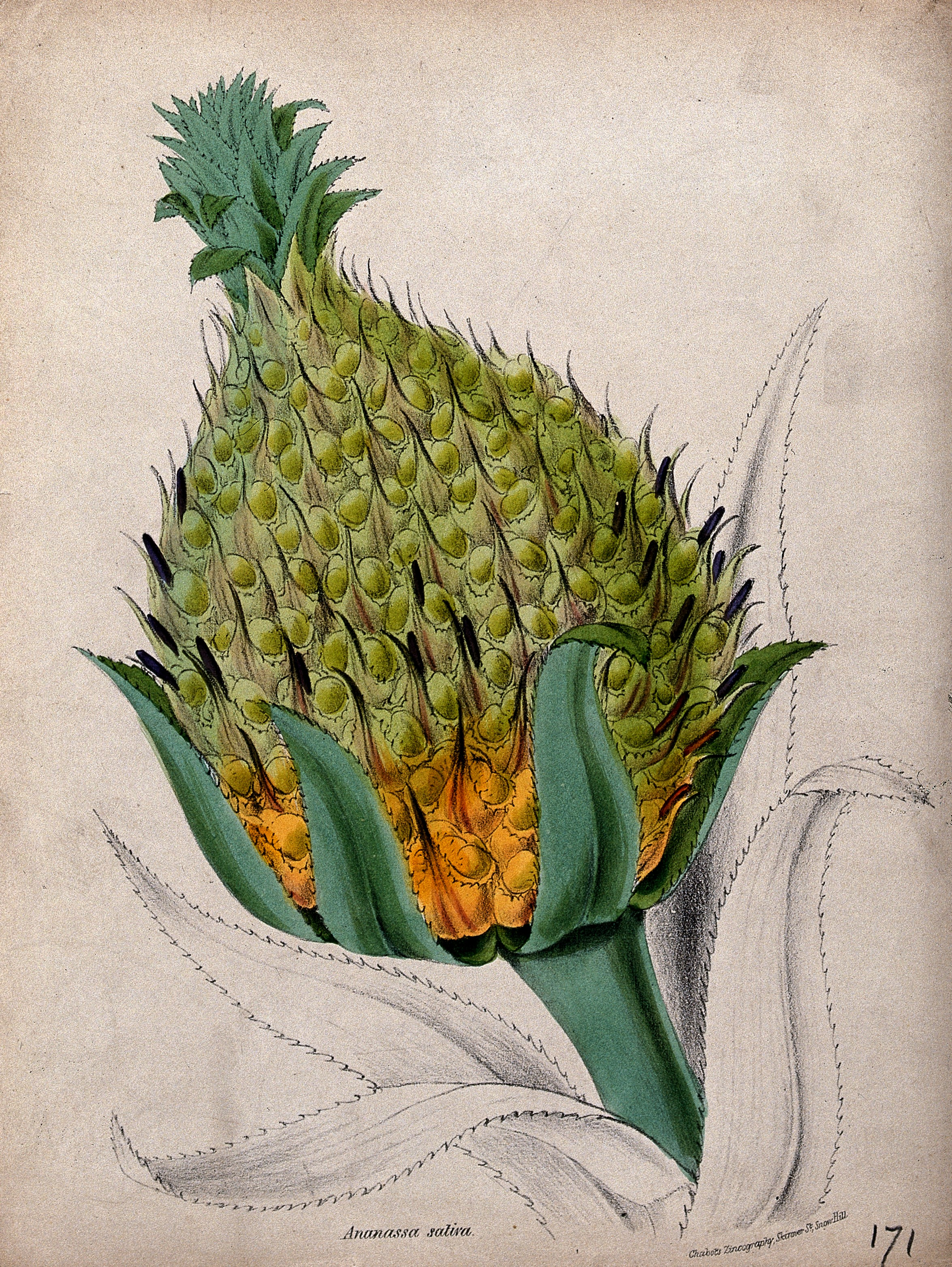
- Illustration of a pineapple by Mary Ann Burnett
- Died: 18 December 1856; London, England
- Occupations: Botanist, author and editor

Mary Ann Burnett (died 18 December 1856) was a British botanist, author and editor.

== Life and work ==
Burnett was the illustrator and editor of Illustrations of Useful Plants employed in the Arts and Medicine (1839–40). Some of the text was written by her brother Gilbert Thomas Burnett. Subsequent editions from 1840 onwards name Mary Ann as the author. Burnett dedicated the 1842 edition of the book to her patron, Miss Minshull.

Burnett died at Fitzroy Square, London, in December 1856 "after a long and painful illness".

== Burnett gallery ==
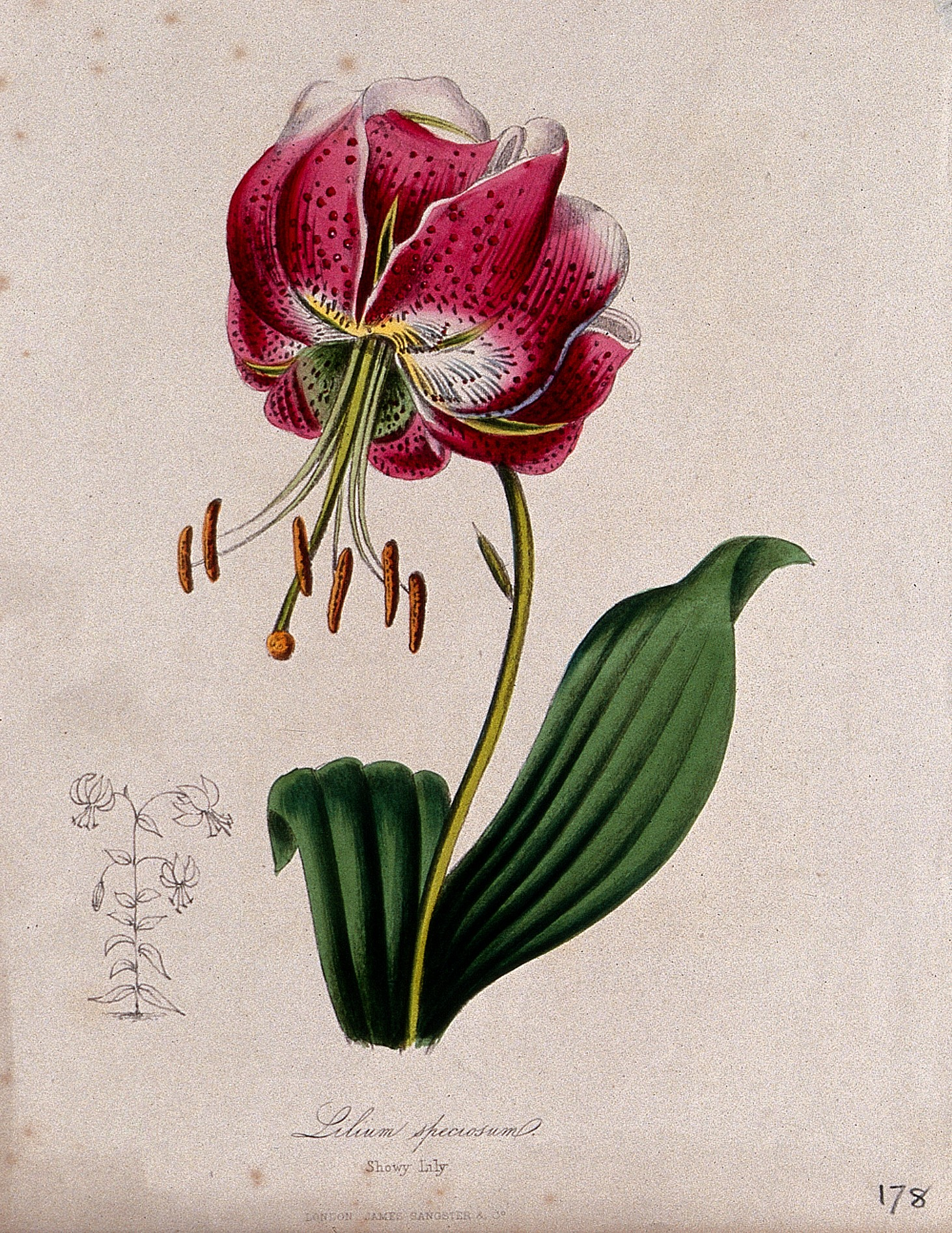
A lily (Lilium species)

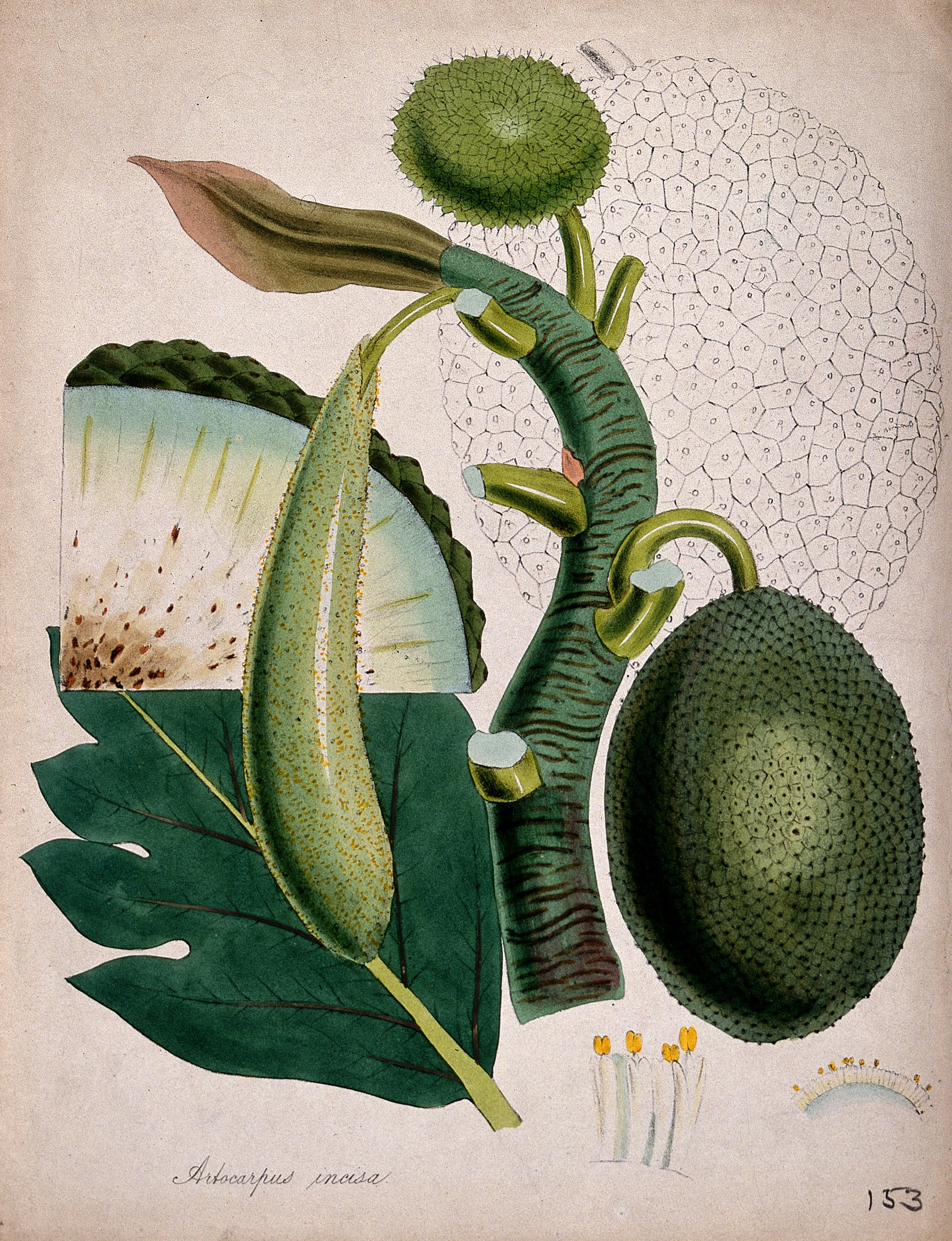
Breadfruit (Artocarpus altilis)

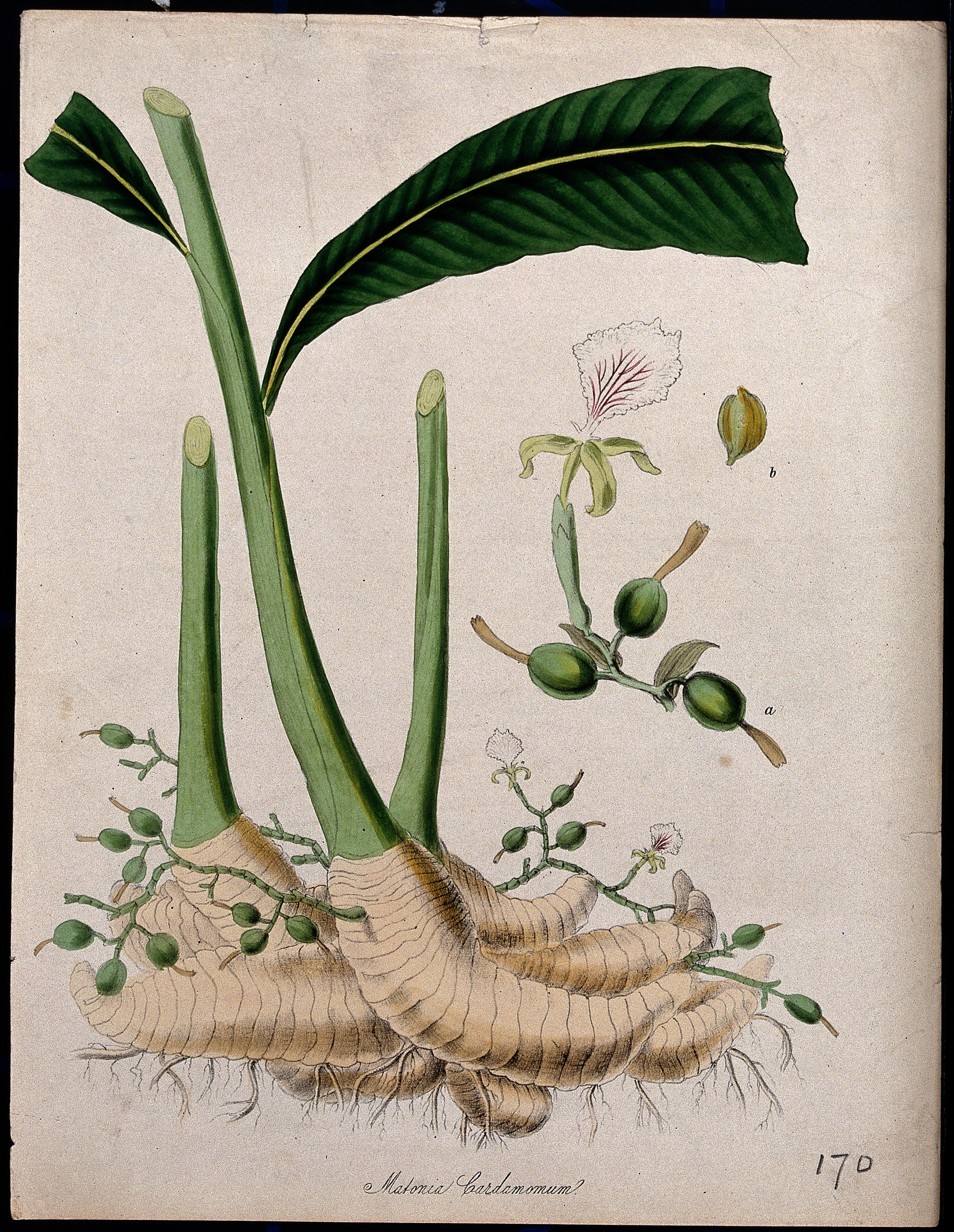
Cardamom plant (Elettaria cardamomum)

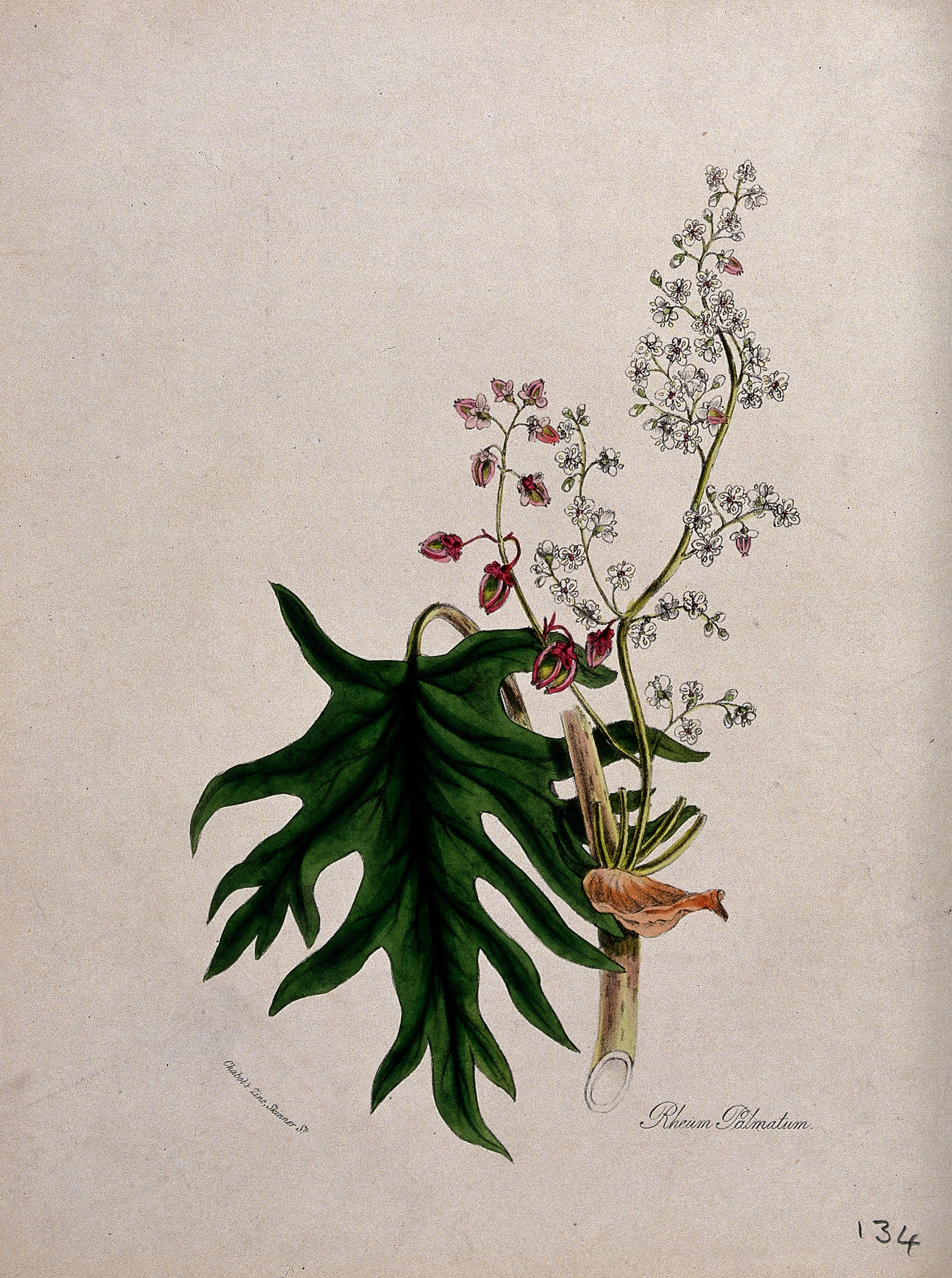
Chinese or Turkish rhubarb (Rheum palmatum)

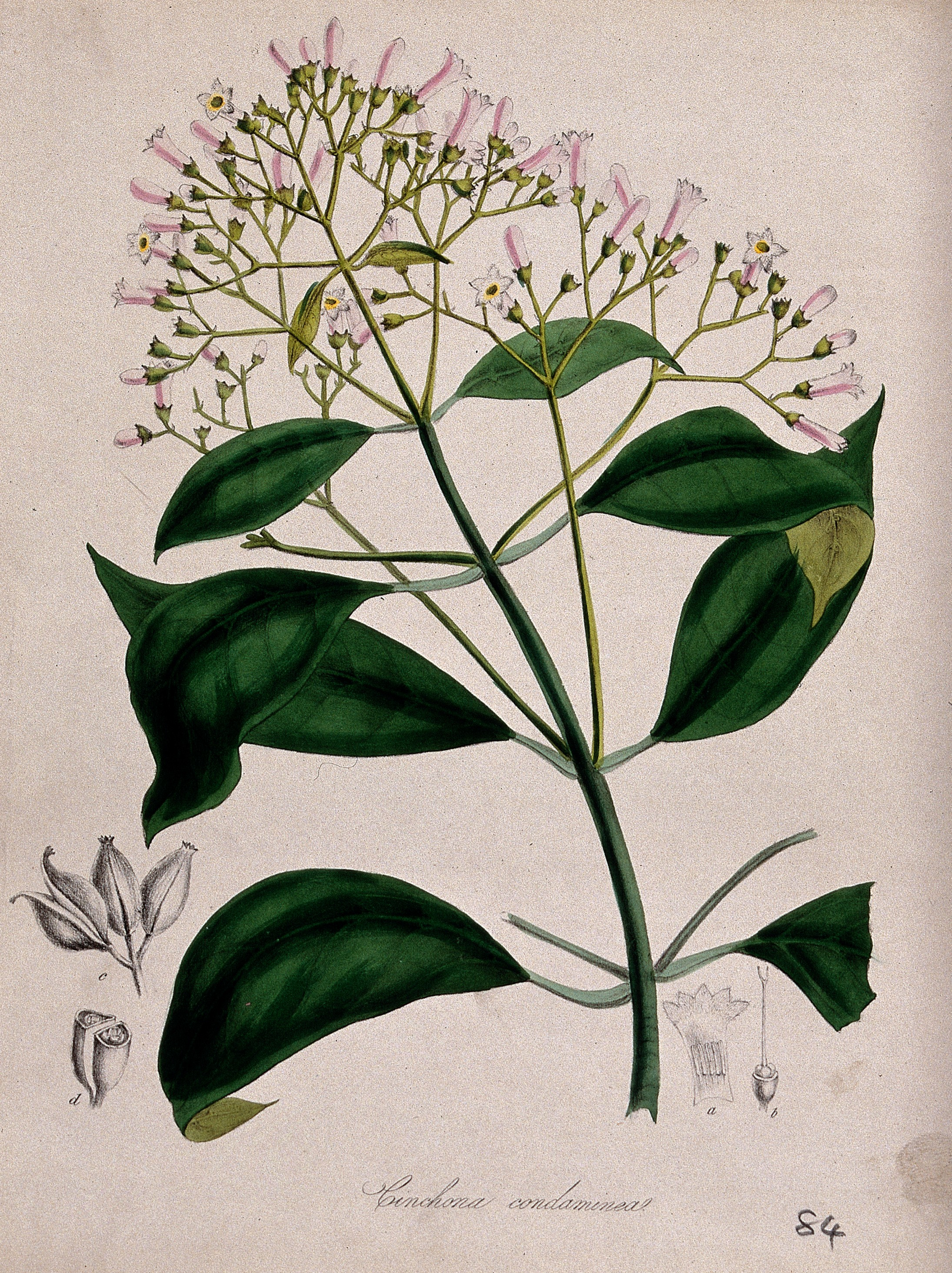
Cinchona plant (Cinchona officinalis)

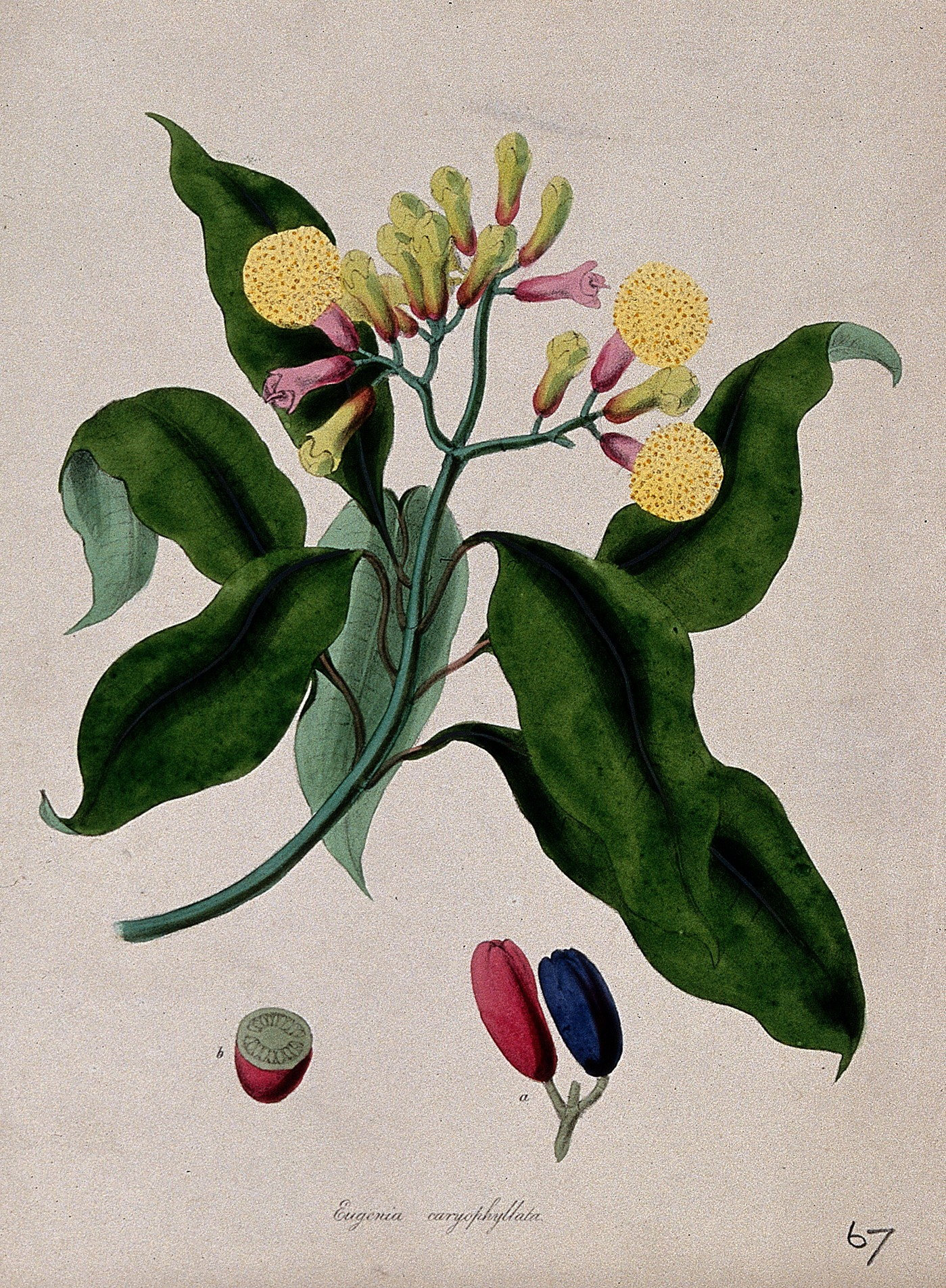
Clove tree (Syzygium aromaticum)

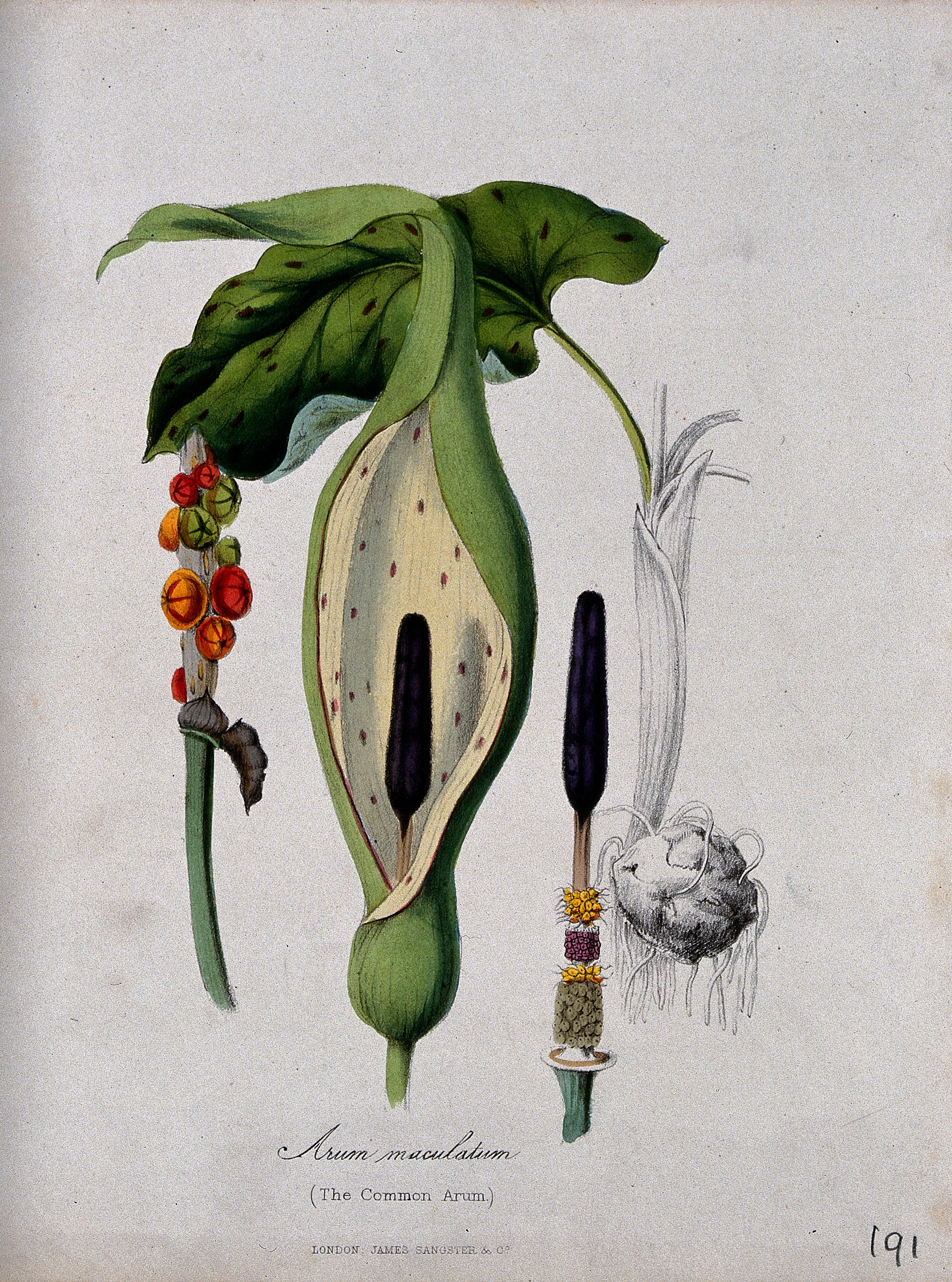
Cuckoo-pint (Arum maculatum)

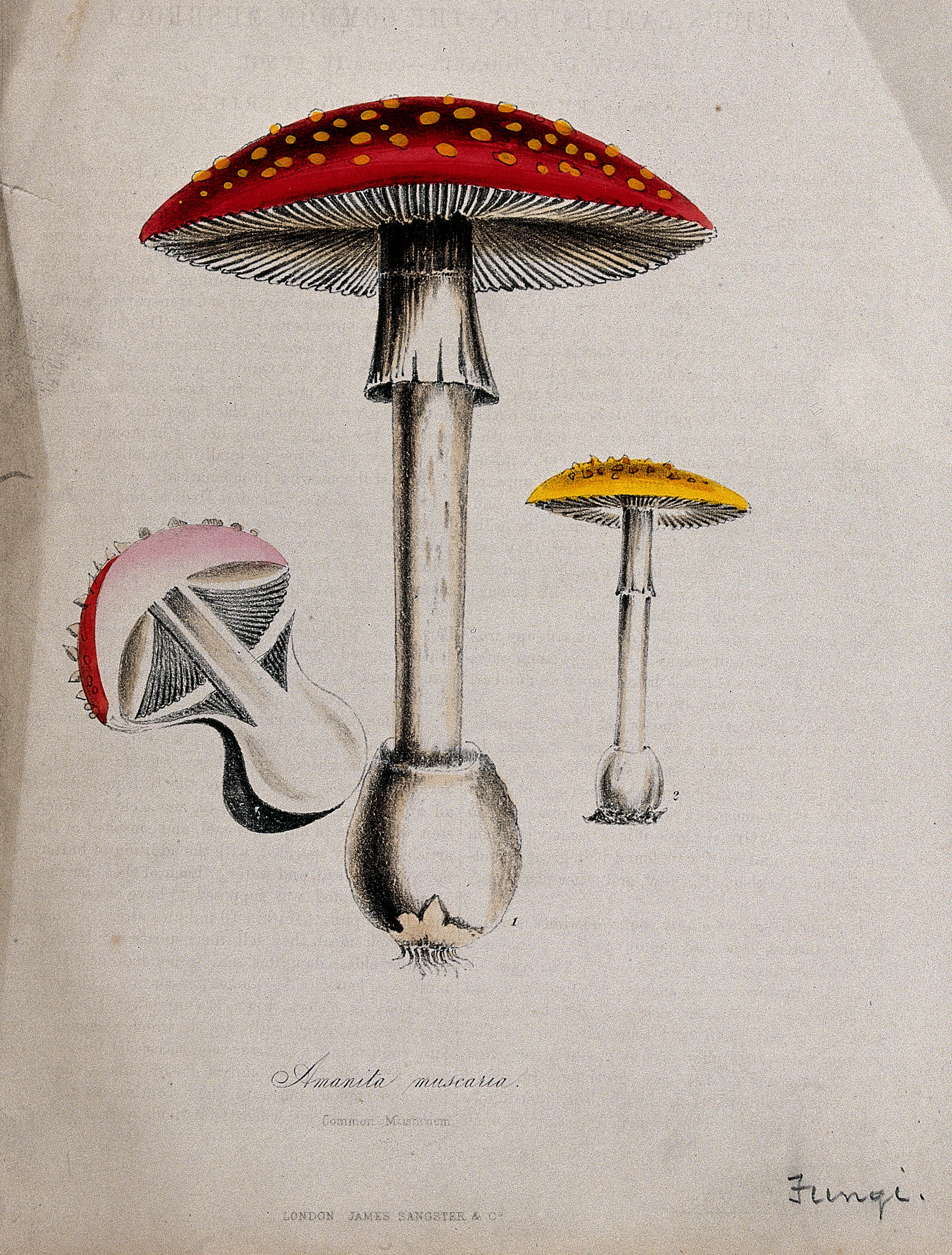
Fly agaric fungus (Amanita muscaria)

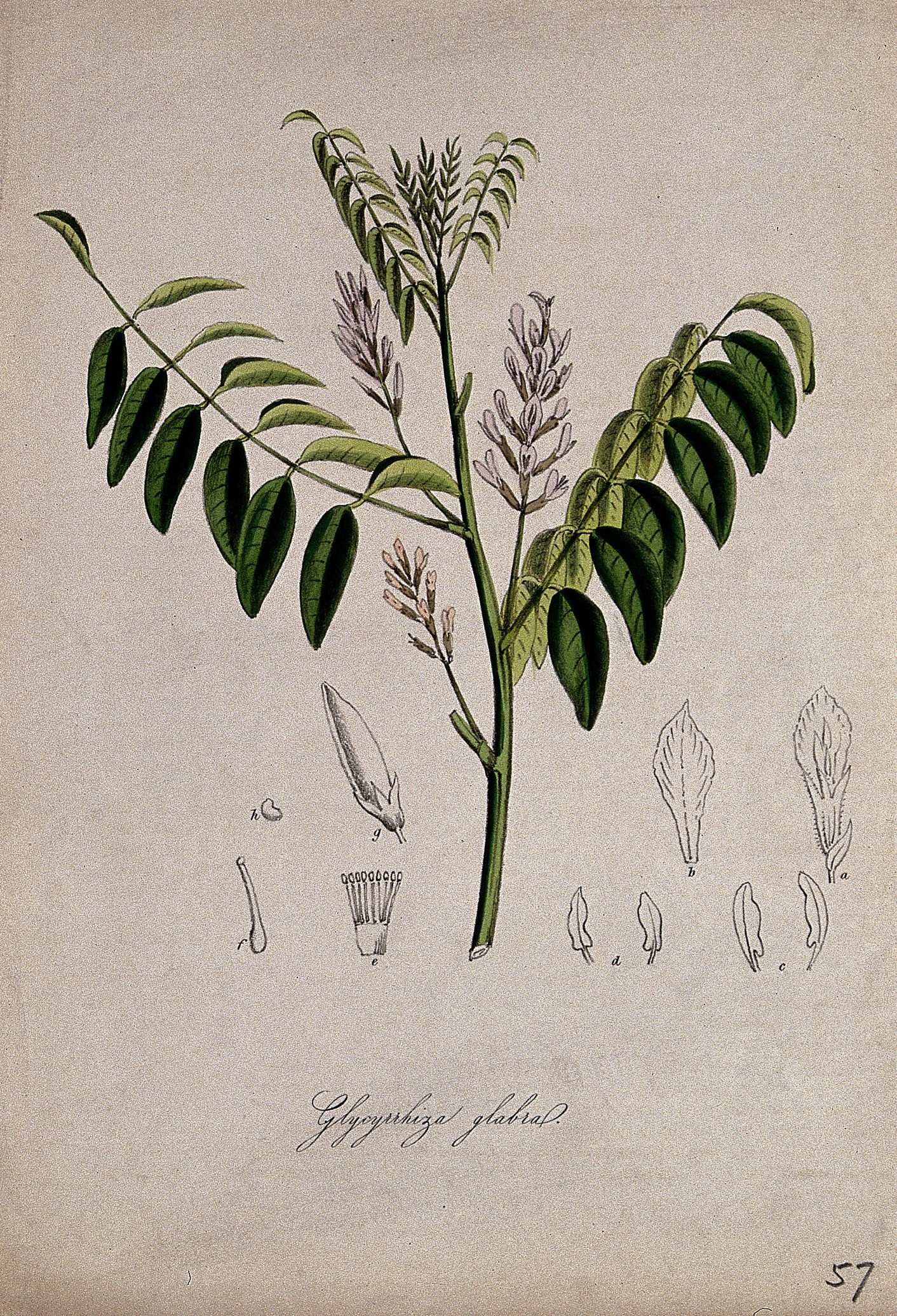
Liquorice plant (Glycyrrhiza glabra)

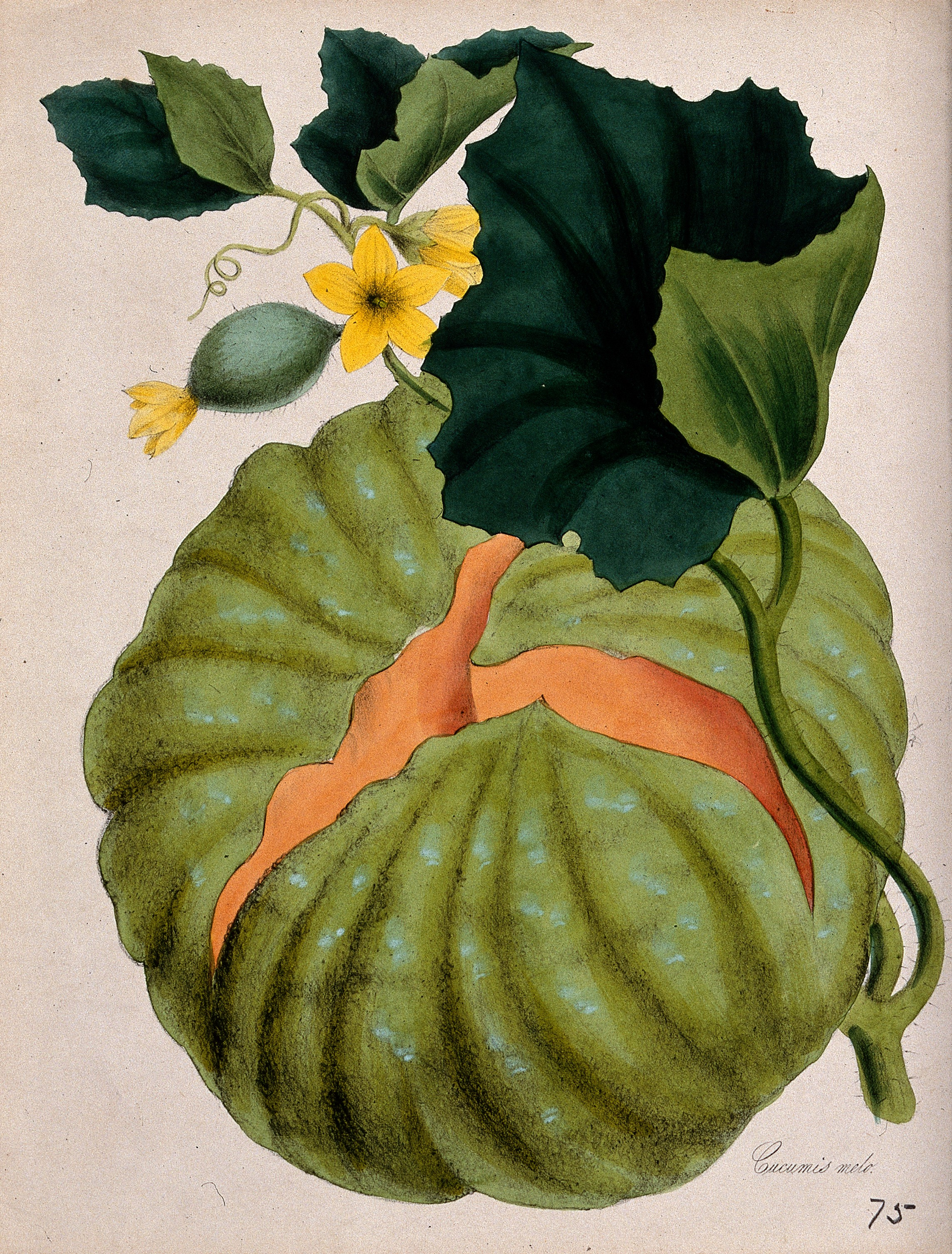
Melon (Cucumis melo)

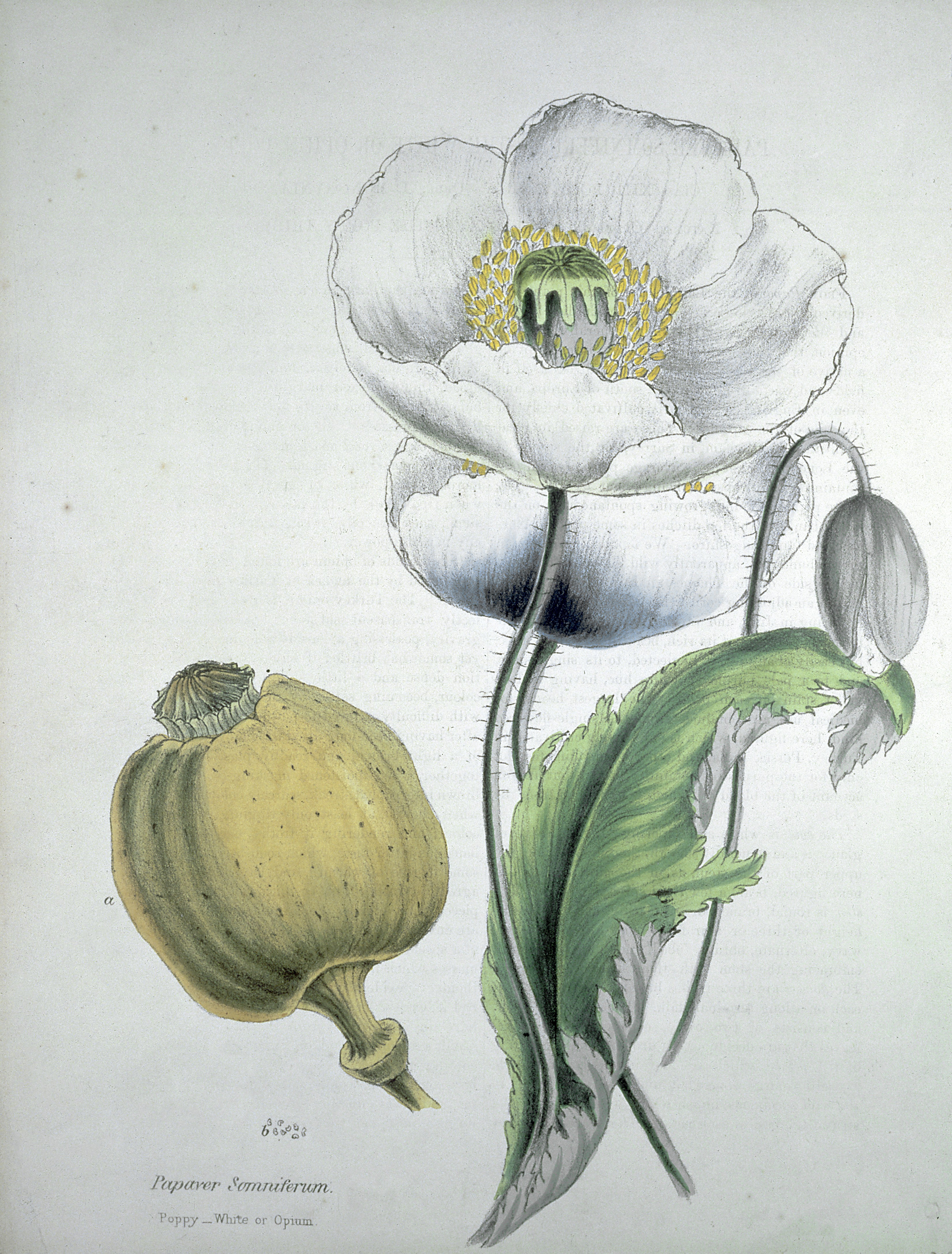
Opium poppy (Papaver somniferum)

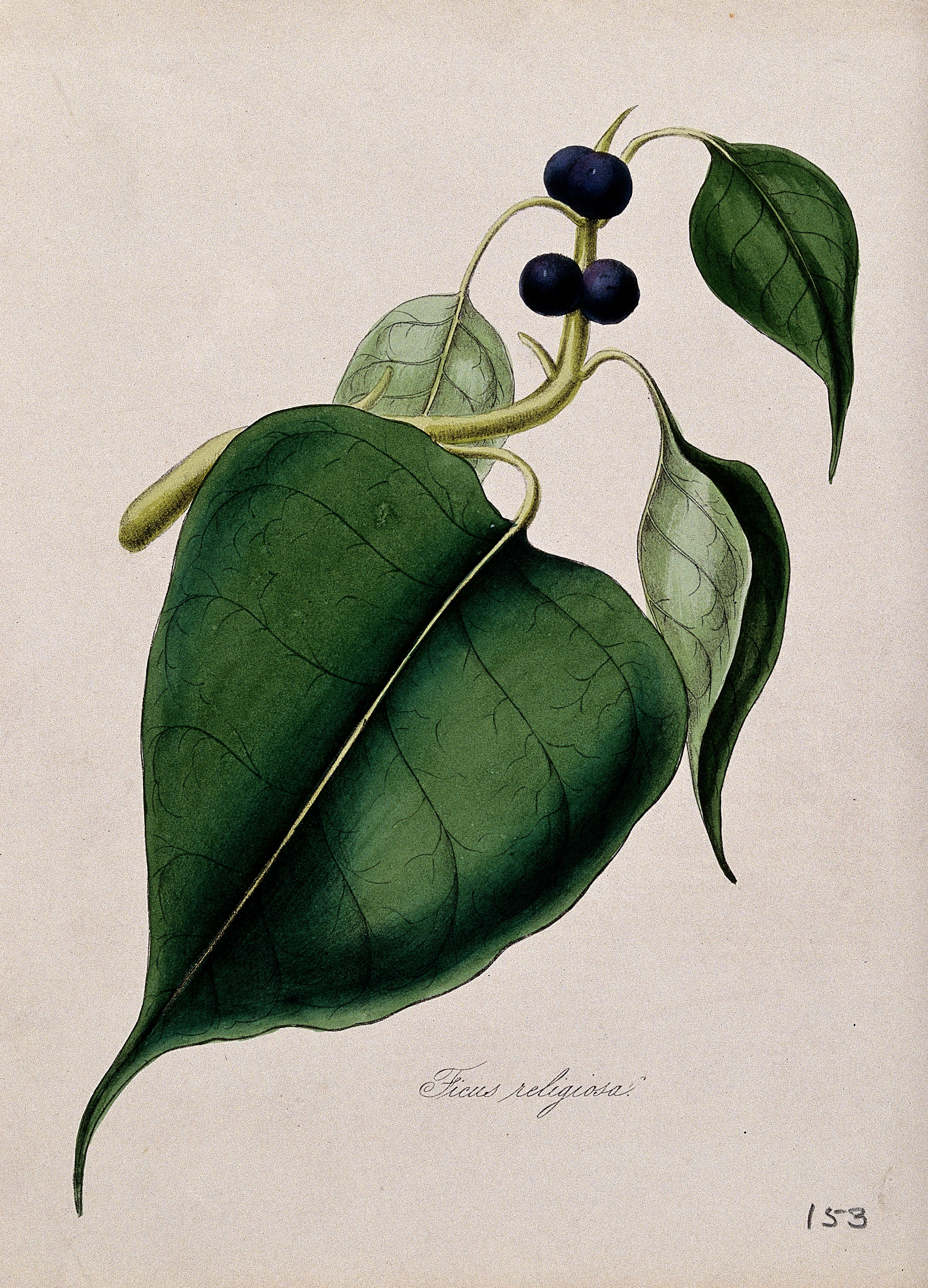
Peepul tree (Ficus religiosa)

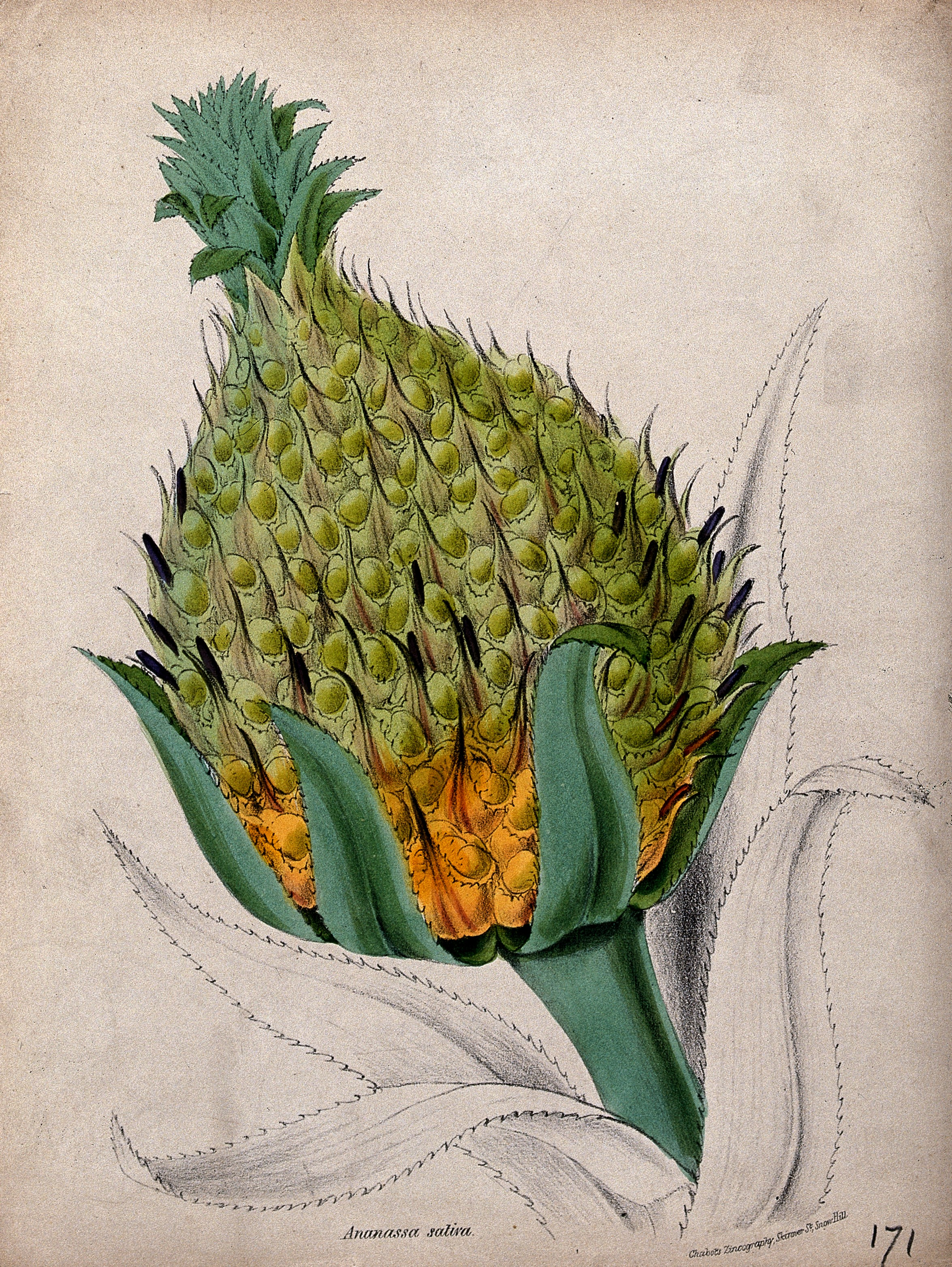
Pineapple (Ananas comosus)

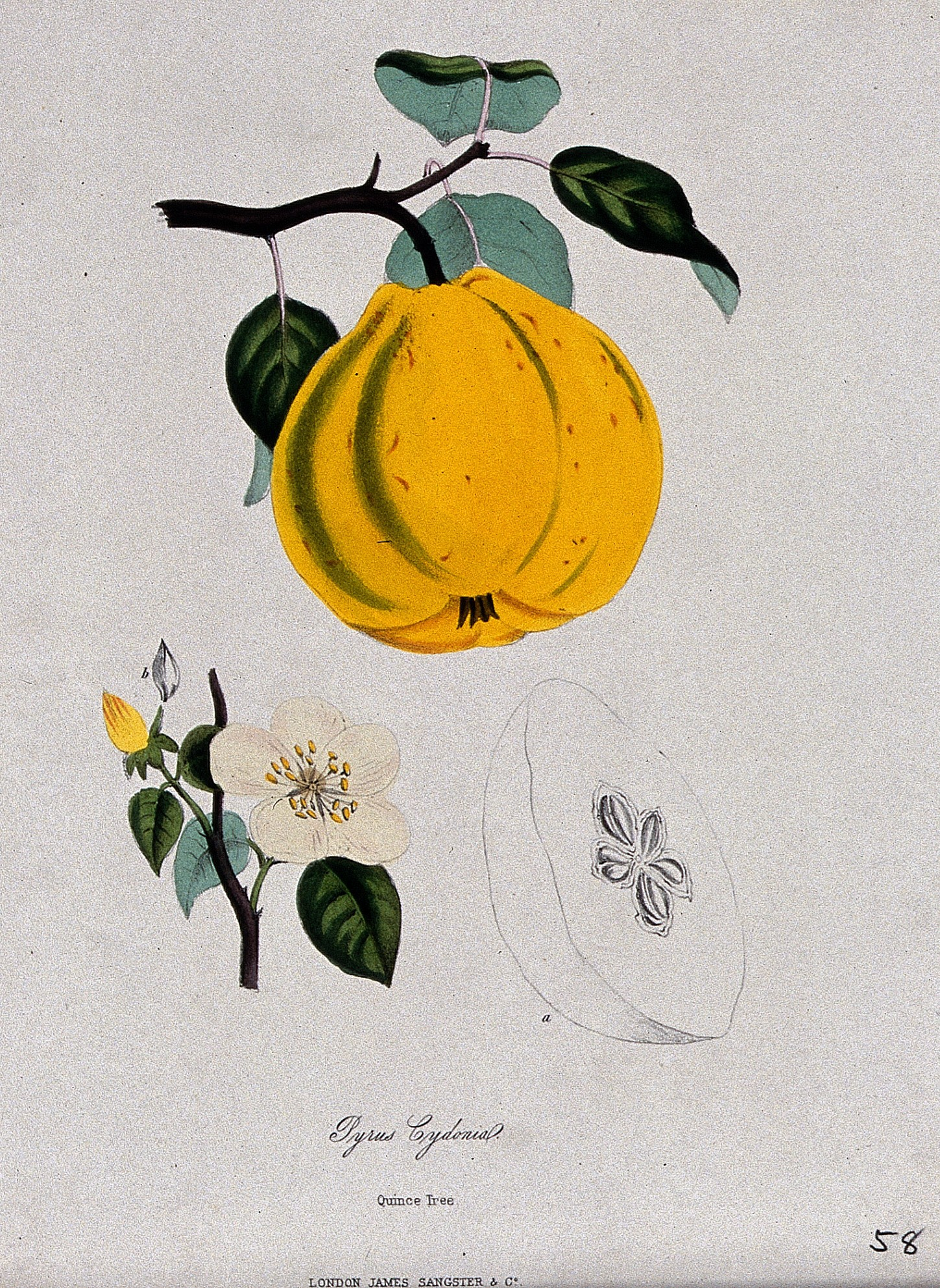
Quince (Cydonia oblonga)

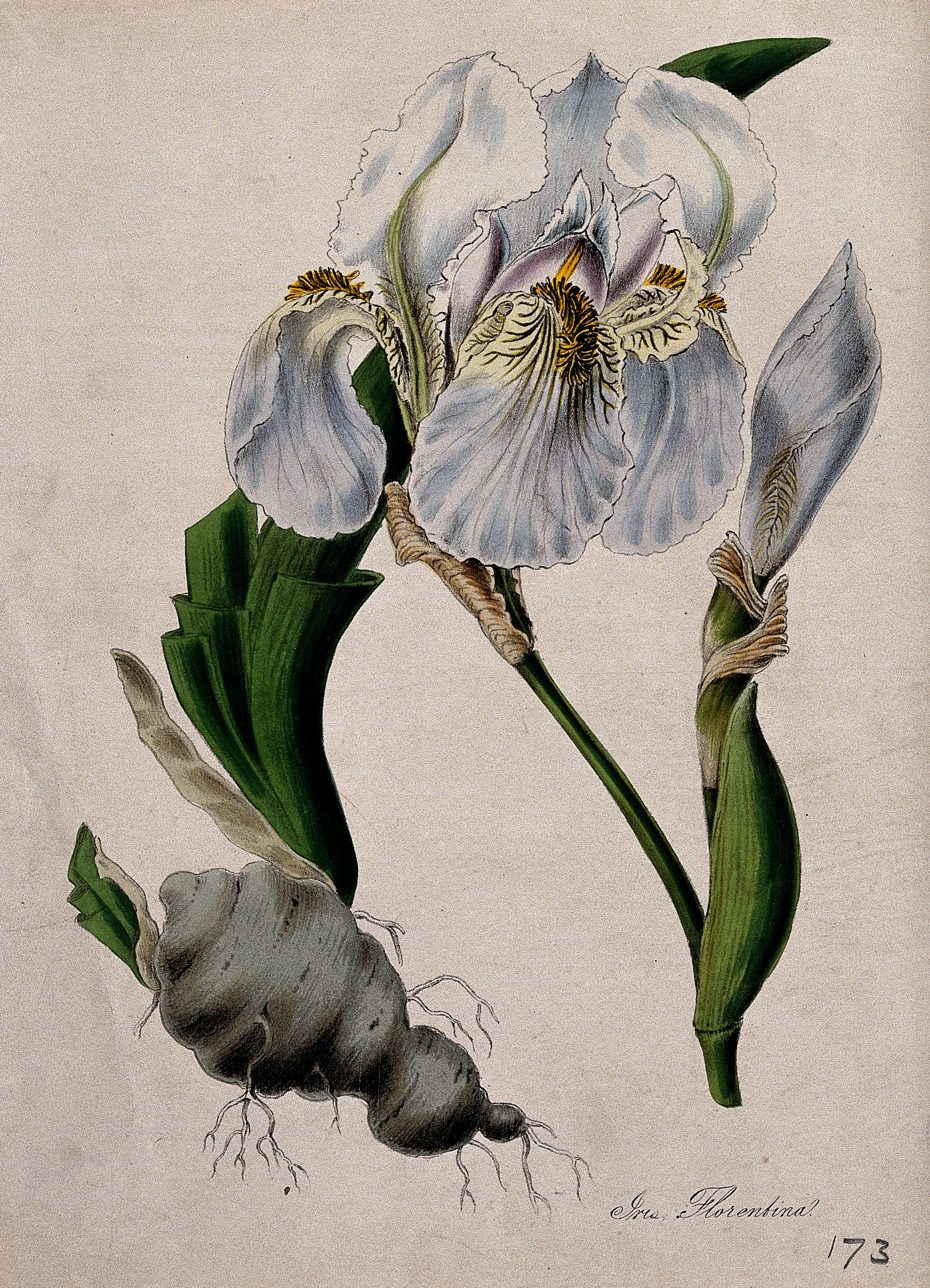
Flag iris (Iris x germanica)

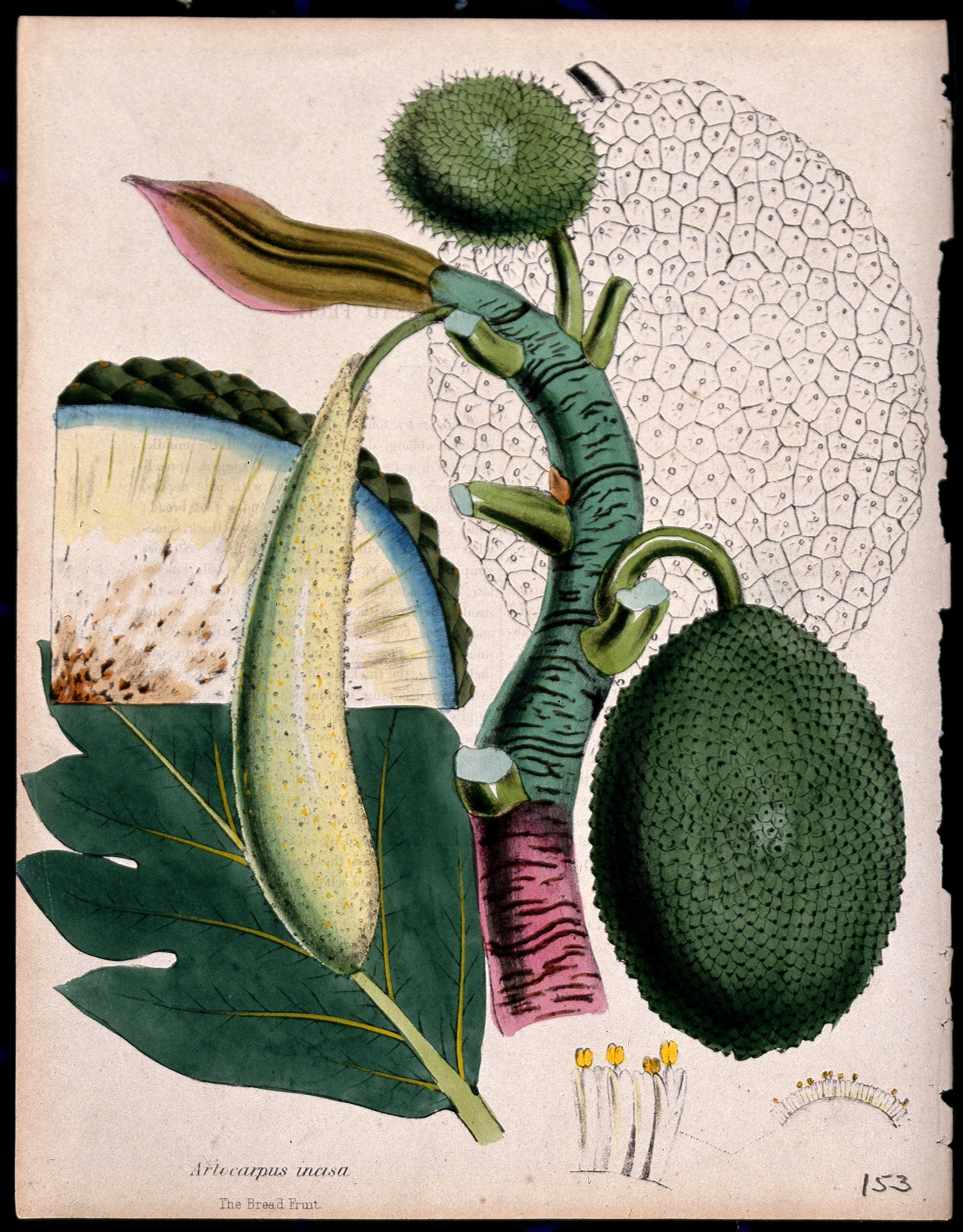
Breadfruit (Artocarpus altilis)

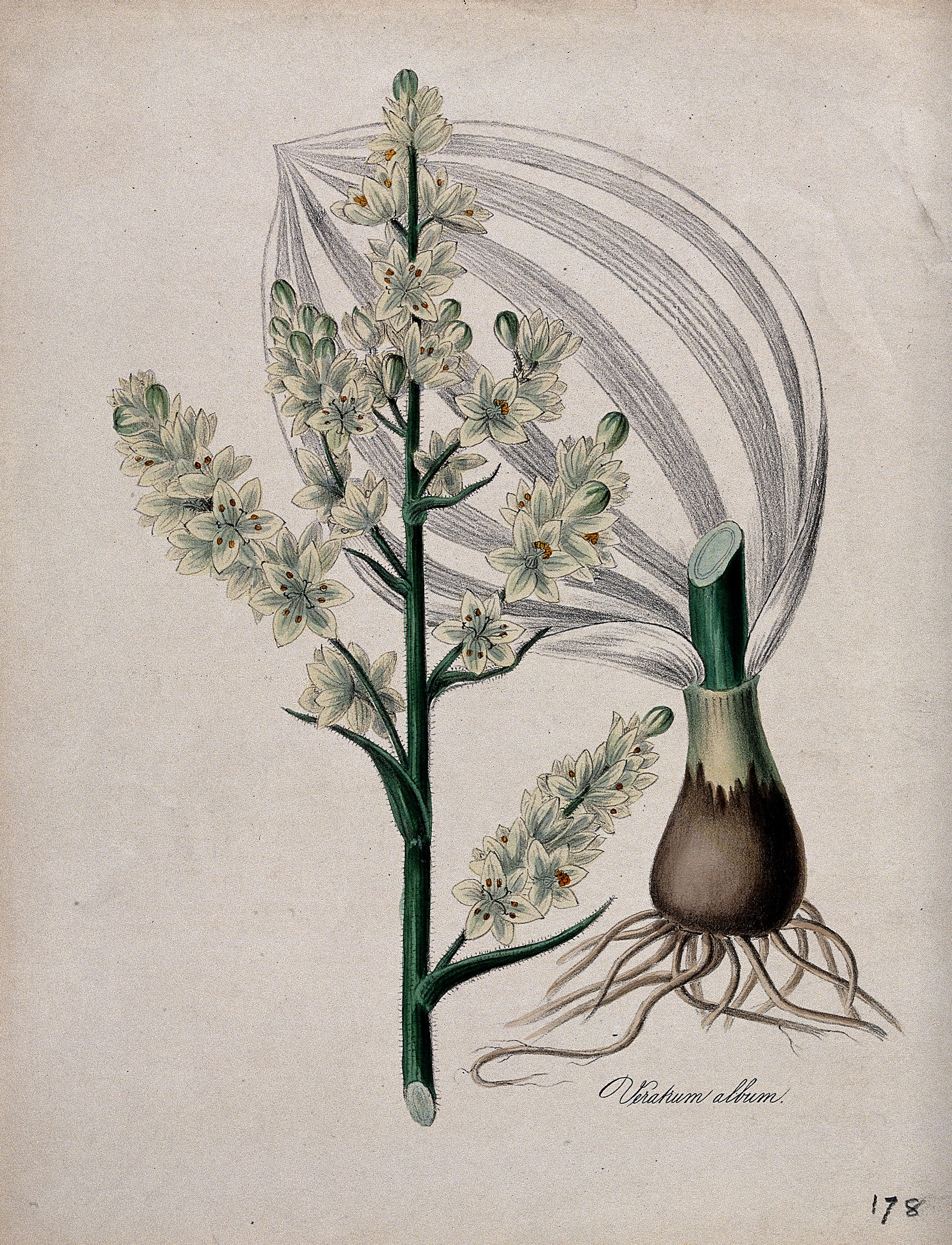
White hellebore (Veratrum album)

== Selected publications ==
- Burnett, M. A. (1842). Plantae utiliores: or illustrations of useful plants, employed in the arts and medicine (Vol. 1). Whittaker & Company.
