= Samuel Congalton =

British mariner (1796–1850)

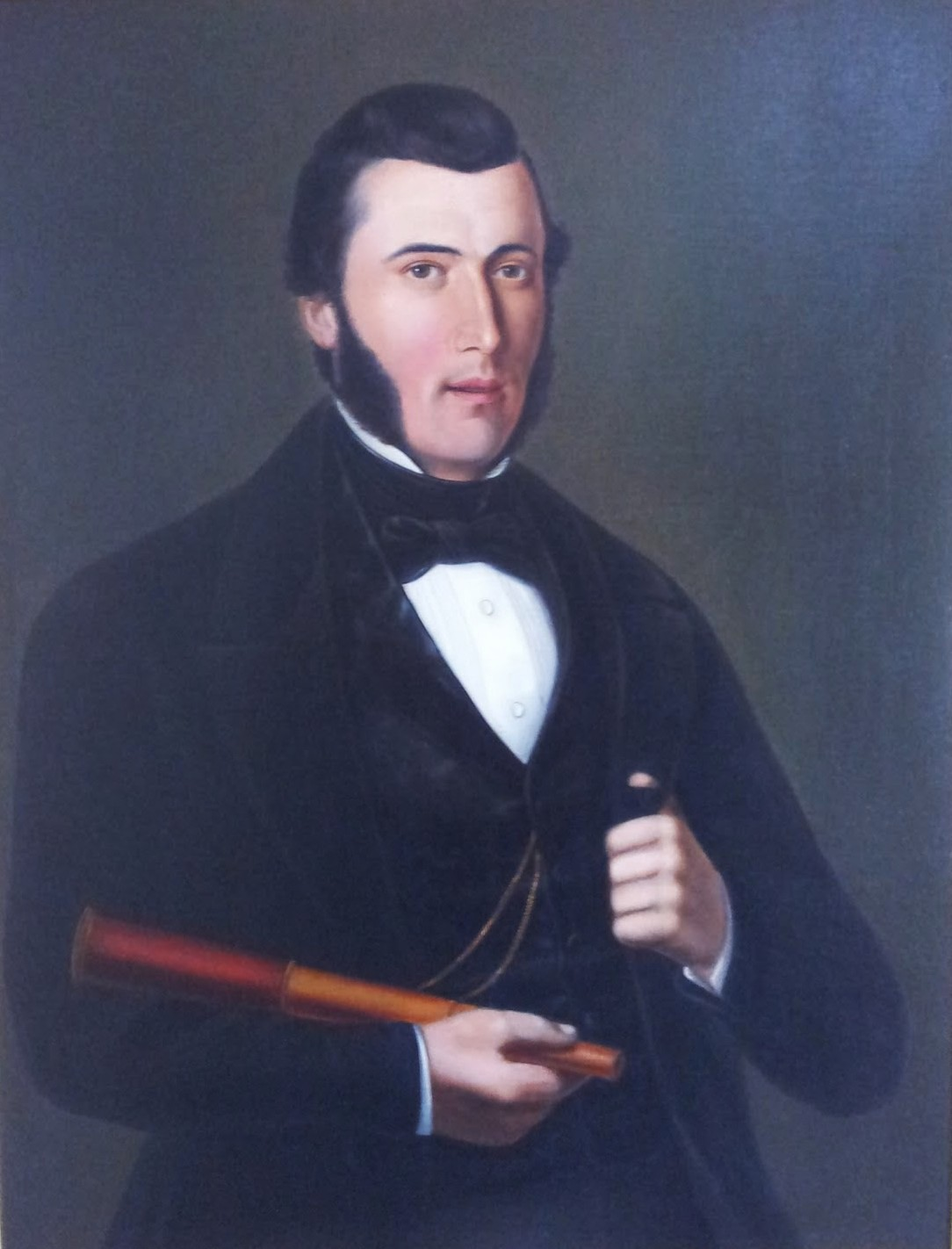
- Born: 23 March 1796; Leith
- Died: April 1850 (aged 54); Penang
- Occupation: Sailor

Samuel Congalton (1796–1850) was a sailor employed by the East India Company for almost 29 years. He did much to combat piracy in the waters of the Straits Settlements.

Born in Leith on 23 March 1796, Congalton ran away from home in a collier but was found by his brother and brought home. He then became a gunner on a ship bound for Calcutta. He went on from there to Penang and became widely known as Captain Congalton. He became master of the paddle steamer Diana, an armed cruiser, when it was bought for use by Singapore in 1837.

He never married, and died in Penang on 19th April 1850.
