= William Clift =

British naturalist

William Clift FRS (14 February 1775 – 20 June 1849) was a British illustrator and conservator.

== Early life ==
Clift was born in Burcombe near Bodmin in Cornwall. He was the youngest of seven children and grew up in poverty following his father's early death.

While attending school in Bodmin, William's talent for drawing attracted the attention of the Prior Colonel Walter Raleigh Gilbert’s wife. Mrs. Gilbert noticed Clift had a natural talent for drawing, visible through his eagerness "to come into her kitchen in Cornwall and make drawings with chalk on the floor." She soon recommended William for an apprenticeship with John Hunter, a celebrated surgeon.

Clift arrived in London on 14 February 1792 and was taken on as an unpaid apprentice "to write and make drawings, to dissect and take part in the charge of the museum" which his master had established at the back of his house in Leicester Square. This arrangement continued until Hunter's death on 16 October 1793.

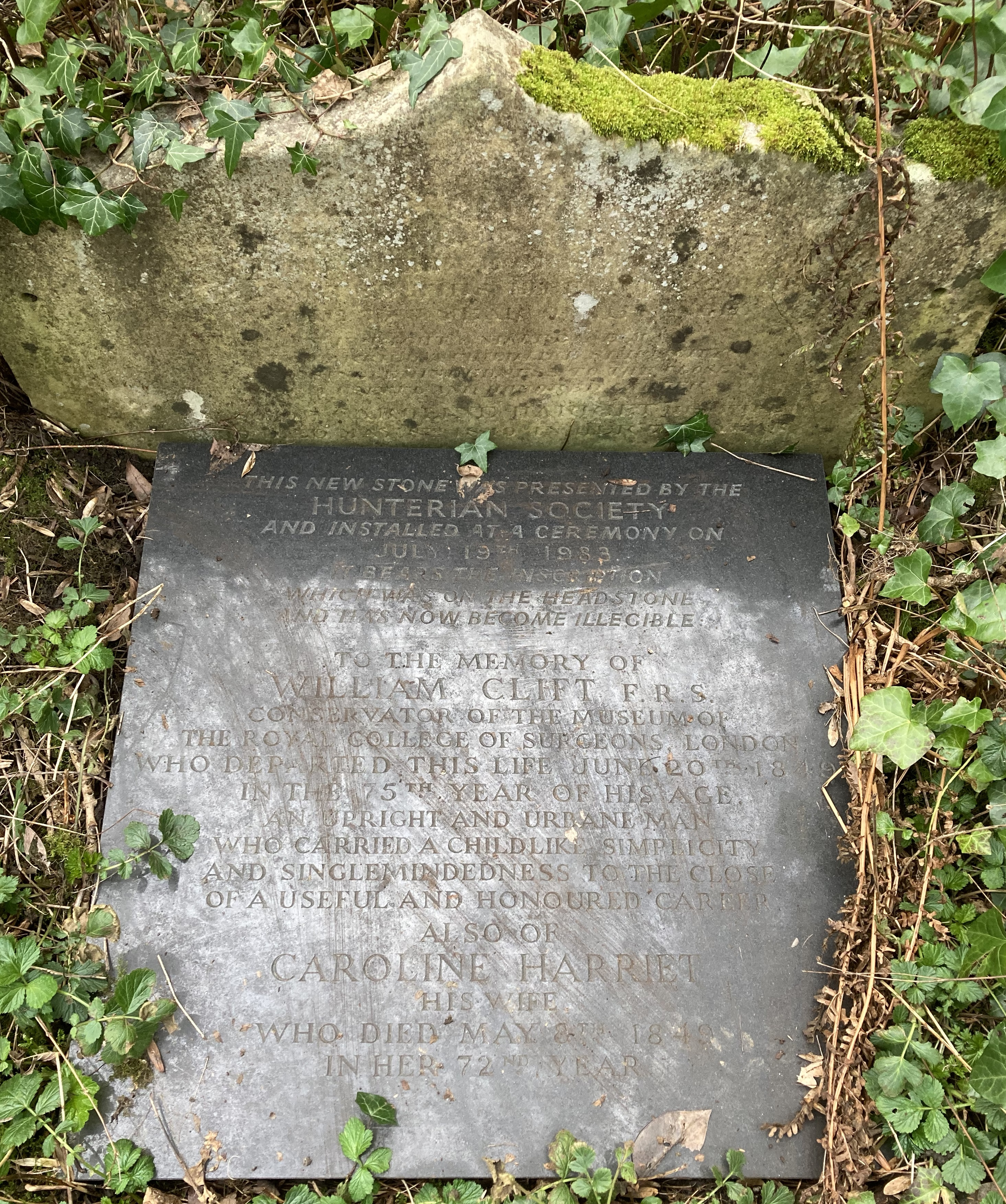
Grave of William Clift in Highgate Cemetery (west side)

== Career ==
After Hunter's death, Clift was engaged for six years by the surgeon's executors to watch over the collections. He lived with an old housekeeper in the house in Castle Street, since his pay was limited to 'seven shillings a week'. He was solely responsible for the safety of collections. He copied and preserved around one half of Hunter's manuscripts that otherwise would have perished. When the collection was purchased by Parliament it was reportedly in a better state than it was at its owner's death. When the newly incorporated Royal College of Surgeons agreed to take charge of the collection in 1800 it agreed to retain Clift as its Conservator, rewarding his services with a salary of about £100 a year. From that date, his time and talent were exclusively devoted to the advancement of comparative anatomy and physiology. He lived to see the museum 'enriched, enlarged, and worthily displayed and illustrated.' Under his supervision, Hunter's collections were successfully relocated twice, first in 1806 to a temporary location and then in 1813 to the College museum.

== Personal life ==
Clift married Caroline Amelia Pope in 1799, at St. Martin's-in-the-Fields in London and remained with her until her death in April 1849. A few weeks later, on 20 June 1849, Clift died at Stanhope Cottage, Hampstead Road, London. They were both buried in Highgate cemetery.

Clift's only son, William Home Clift, assisted his father in the museum. He was born in 1803 and died in 1833. His only daughter, Caroline Amelia Clift, was married at New St. Pancras Church on 20 July 1835 to Professor (later Sir Richard) Owen, and died at Sheen Lodge, Richmond Park, on 7 May 1873, age 70.

== Legacy ==
Clift achieved respect and popularity within the scientific community of his time. Dr. South spoke of him as 'a kindly-hearted creature, always ready to impart and not to appropriate information,' and with a 'head crammed full of knowledge.' Benjamin Brodie the elder praised his industry and his thirst for the acquisition of knowledge, his sagacity and keen observation. He was esteemed by Sir Joseph Banks, Dr. Wollaston, Sir Humphry Davy. Through the influence of the latter, he was elected Fellow of the Royal Society on 8 May 1823.

He was a member of the Chemical Society, a group of members of the Royal Society who submitted papers to the parent institution with the object of promoting the study of animal chemistry. Gideon Mantell acknowledged his debt to Clift in the original memoir on the Iguanodon. Baron Cuvier acknowledged his assistance in the concluding volume of his work on fossil remains. Clift's knowledge of osteology is referred to by Sir Charles Lyell and his researches in anatomical science were referenced by Sir Benjamin Brodie.

Clift's drawings were featured in A Series of Engravings … to illustrate the Morbid Anatomy of some of the most important parts of the Human Body, by Matthew Baillie. Its initial advertisement announced that 'the drawings will be made by a young man, who is not only very well skilled in his own arts, but who possesses a considerable share of knowledge in anatomy.' Clift's illustrations featured in Sir Everard Home's papers on Comparative Anatomy in the Philosophical Transactions.

In 1861 Sir Richard Owen published Essays and Observations on Natural History, Anatomy, &c., by John Hunter. These were printed from Clift's copies of Hunter's original manuscripts. Most of the original manuscripts had been destroyed while in the care of Sir Everard Home in 1823. When Clift was told of this destruction he is reported to have burst into tears saying, "Well, Sir Everard, there is but one thing more to be done, that is to destroy the collection".

He was the compiler of the catalog of the osteology in the Hunterian Museum, and he gave valuable evidence to the parliamentary committee on medical education in 1834. Dr. Westby-Gibson is the owner of two manuscripts in shorthand, giving the particulars of forty-nine lectures delivered by Dr. Haighton at Guy's Hospital 1814–15, which are believed to be the work of Clift. His portrait, from a daguerreotype, is in Claudet's Historical Gallery and his bust in plaster, with the date 1843, is placed on the entrance door to the western museum of the College of Surgeons.
