= Thomas Lynn =

Commander Thomas Lynn (2 January 1774 – 2 May 1847) was a Bombay Marine officer and writer.

== Life ==
He was born 2 January 1774 at Woodbridge, Suffolk, where his father was a medical practitioner. At the age of 11 he entered the Bombay Marine. On leaving it at the rank of commander many years later, he was appointed examiner in nautical astronomy to the company's officers. He kept a naval academy at 148 Leadenhall Street, London, and died at Dover on 2 May 1847, aged 73.

== Works ==
Lynn wrote:

- An Improved System of Telegraphic Communication, London, 1814; 2nd edit. 1818.
- Solar Tables, 1821.
- Star Tables for 1822, etc.
- Astronomical and other Tables, 1824.
- A New Method of finding the Longitude, two editions, 1826.
- Horary Tables for finding the Time by Inspection, 1827; 2nd edit. 1828.
- Practical Methods for finding the Latitude, 1833.
- New Star Tables, 1843.

A chapter by him on the navigation of the China seas formed part of the volumes on China published in the Edinburgh Cabinet Library, 1836; 3rd edit. 1843.
