= Diana (1823 ship) =

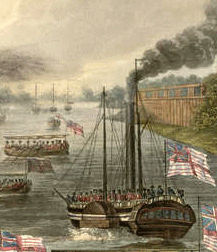
- Diana during the attack on the stockades at Pagoda Point on the Rangoon River on 8 July 1824

History

United Kingdom
- Name: Diana
- Operator: Honourable East India Company
- Builder: Kyds, Kidderpore, Calcutta
- Launched: 12 July 1823
- Acquired: Purchased in 1824
- Fate: Transferred to Burmese Government 1826; Bought to HEIC in Singapore 1837; Sold and renamed 1845

General characteristics
- Tons burthen: 133 bm
- Length: 100 ft (30.5 m)
- Beam: 16 ft 8 in (5.1 m)
- Propulsion: 2 × 16 hp (12 kW) side lever engines; Paddles

Diana was a steam paddle steamer built in 1823 as a merchant vessel that in 1824 the Bengal Government purchased. During the First Anglo-Burmese War she became the first steam-powered warship of the Honourable East India Company to see action. She was transferred to the Burmese Government in 1826, and back to the company for use by Singapore in 1837.

== Construction ==
Drawing of the bow and stern of Diana

She was built by Kyds of Kidderpore, Calcutta as a 133-ton merchant vessel with two 16 horsepower (12 kW) side-lever engines manufactured by Henry Maudslay of Lambeth. She was launched on 12 July 1823, and purchased by the Bengal Government at the suggestion of Commander Frederick Marryat. She was armed with Congreve rockets.

== First Anglo–Burmese War ==
The Honourable East India Company used her for riverine service in the First Anglo–Burmese War. In May 1824, she accompanied the 18-gun Cruizer-class brig-sloop HMS Sophie, the 20-gun HMS Larne and the 50-gun HMS Liffey, from Port Cornwallis in the Andaman Islands to Rangoon, where she participated in an attack. Thereafter, she participated in operations against Penang on 19 September 1824.

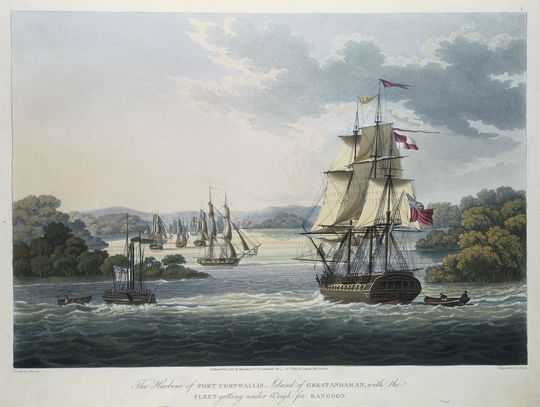
The Harbour of Port Cornwallis, Island of Great Andaman, circa 1825, with the East India Company fleet getting under weigh for Rangoon; Diana is the paddle steamer at the bottom left of this print, and Liffey on the right.

In 1825 and 1826, she was under the command of Lieutenant George Winsor, who sailed her with the flotilla operating against the Burmese. While she was operating in the Irrawaddy River, Winsor made a map.

== Burma and Singapore ==
The war ended on 8 March 1826, and in that year she was transferred to the Burmese Government. Although one reference says she was broken up in 1836, most assert that she was sold to Singapore.

Diana steamed to Singapore on 28 February 1836. There, Johnston & Co. advertised her for sale. The East India Company purchased her in March 1837, and appointed Samuel Congalton her captain. Diana's establishment consisted of her captain, two European officers, and thirty Malays. In the East India Company's service Diana suppressed piracy and conducted maritime surveys. Congalton remained her captain until 1845, when he became captain of her replacement, Hooghly. Diana appears to have been sold off and renamed Eliza Penelope.
