= Gilbert Thomas Burnett =

British botanist (1800–1835)

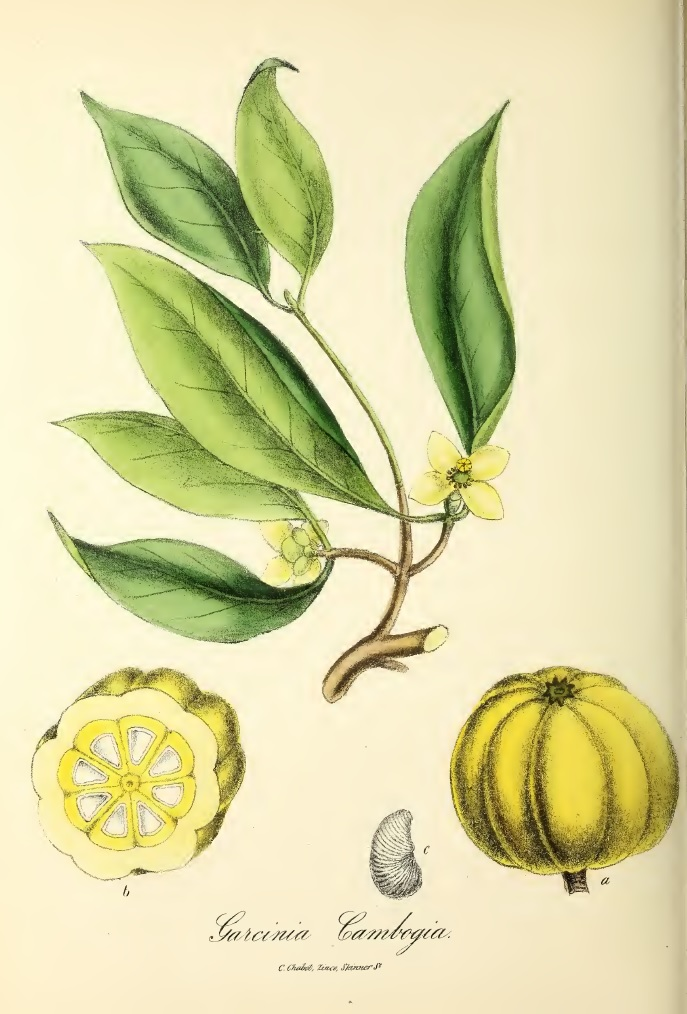
Garcinia gummi-gutta Mary Ann Burnett

Gilbert Thomas Burnett (15 April 1800 – 27 July 1835) was a British botanist.

== Life ==
Burnett was the first professor of botany at King's College London, from 1831 to 1835. He was the author of Outlines of Botany (1835), and Illustrations of Useful Plants employed in the Arts and Medicine, published posthumously and illustrated by his sister Mary Ann Burnett. The standard author abbreviation Burnett is used to indicate this person as the author when citing a botanical name.

Burnett also wrote articles on zoology, such as Illustrations of the Manupeda or apes and their allies (1828).

== Publications ==
- Outlines of Botany. 1835
- Plantæ utiliores : or Illustrations of Useful Plants employed in the Arts & Medicine
- Illustrations of the Manupeda or apes and their allies. 1828

An Encyclopædia of Useful and Ornamental Plants
An Encyclopædia of Useful and Ornamental Plants Consisting of Beautiful and Accurate Coloured Figures of Plants Used in the Arts, In Medicine, and For Ornament, with Copious Scientific and Popular Descriptions of Each, Accounts of Their Uses, and Mode of Culture, and Numerous Interesting Anecdotes. In Two Volumes. Vol. II. London: George Willis, Great Piazza, Covent Garden. 1852.
