= Family tree of Kedahan monarchs =

Royal family tree

Genealogies of Kedah Rulers can be found in two traditional Malay texts, the first one being Hikayat Merong Mahawangsa, a chronicle written in the late 16th century, and the other is Al-Tarikh Salasilah Kedah ('genealogies of Kedah'), a royal-sanctioned history published in 1928. The records however do not provide consistent genealogies for the early Rulers of Kedah. According to the Hikayat, Kedah's first Ruler was Merong Mahawangsa. In the Salasilah, it is stated that the first Kedah Ruler was Derbar Raja I who originated from Persia in the 9th century CE.

Nevertheless, the Hikayat and Salasilah do share some similarities, the most important is that both texts state that the first converted Ruler to Islam took the name Sultan Muzaffar Shah, although the original name of the Ruler is different. Hikayat mentions that Raja Phra Ong Mahawangsa was the first to convert to Islam, while in the Salasilah, it is stated it was Derbar Raja II. The following family tree is based on the royal-sanctioned Salasilah. The beginning of Sultan Mudzaffar Shah I's reign is typically dated to 1136 in Kedah tradition.

House of Mahawangsa

Derbar Raja I
Diraja Putra
Maha Dewa I
Karna DiRaja
Kerma
Maha Dewa II
Dharma Raja
Maha Jiwa
Mudzaffar I (Derbar Raja II)^{(1)} r. 1136–1179
Mu'adzam^{(2)} r. 1179–1201
Muhammad^{(3)} r. 1201–1236
Mudzaffar II^{(4)} r. 1236–1280
Mahmud I^{(5)} r. 1280–1321
Ibrahim^{(6)} r. 1321–1373
Sulaiman^{(7)} r. 1373–1422
Ataullah I^{(8)} r. 1422–1472
Muhammad; Jiwa I^{(9)} r. 1472–1506
Mahmud II^{(10)} r. 1506–1546
Mudzaffar III^{(11)} r. 1546–1602
Sulaiman II^{(12)} r. 1602–1619
Rijaluddin^{(13)} r. 1619–1651
Muhyiddin^{(14)} r. 1651–1661
Ziauddin I^{(15)} r. 1661–1687
Ataullah II^{(16)} r. 1687–1698
Abdullah; Mu'adzam^{(17)} r. 1698–1706
Ahmad Tajuddin I^{(18)} r. 1706–1709	Muhammad; Jiwa II^{(19)} r. 1710–1778
Abdullah; Mukarram^{(20)} r. 1778–1798	Ziauddin II^{(21)} r. 1798–1804
Ahmad Tajuddin II^{(22)} r. 1804–1821 r. 1842–1845
Zainal Rashid I^{(23)} r. 1845–1854
Ahmad Tajuddin; Mukarram^{(24)} r. 1854–1879
Zainal Rashid II^{(25)} r. 1879–1881	Abdul Hamid^{(26)} r. 1882–1943
Badlishah^{(27)} r. 1943–1958	Tunku; Abdul Rahman
Abdul Halim^{(28)} r. 1958–2017; Agong V r. 1970–1975; Agong XIV r. 2011–2016	Sallehuddin^{(29)} r. 2017–present

== Bibliography ==
- Ahmad Sarji Abdul Hamid (2011), The Encyclopedia of Malaysia, vol. 16 - The Rulers of Malaysia, Editions Didier Millet, ISBN 978-981-3018-54-9
- Buyong Adil (1980), Sejarah Kedah (History of Kedah), Dewan Bahasa dan Pustaka.
