= House of Mahawangsa =

Malaysia royal dynasty

House of Mahawangsa Wangsa Mahawangsa
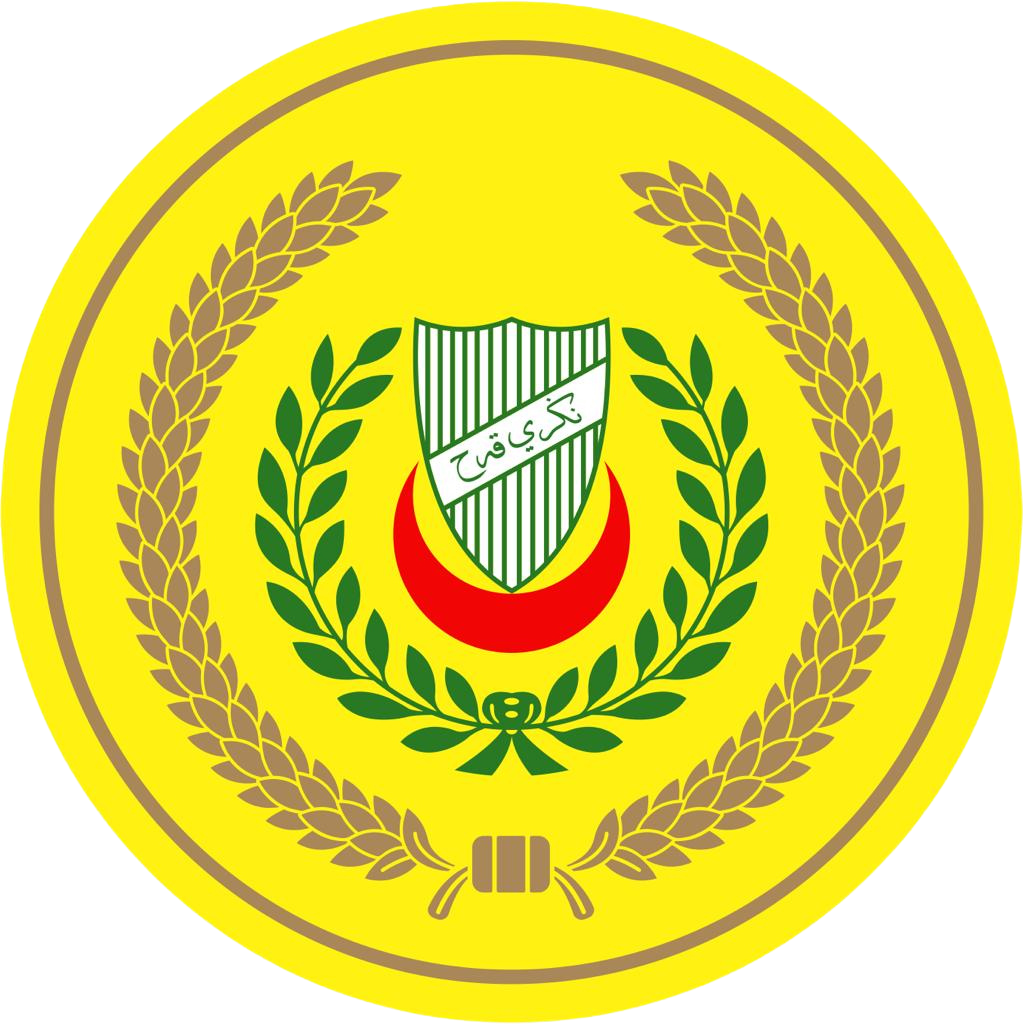
- Country: Kedah Darul Aman, Malaysia
- Founded: 1136; 889 years ago
- Founder: Raja Merong Mahawangsa
- Current head: Al-Aminul Karim Sultan Sallehuddin
- Titles: Sultan of Kedah
- Traditions: Sunni Islam (Shāfi‘ī)
- Motto: Aman Makmur (Peace & Prosperity)
- Estate: Istana Anak Bukit (Alor Setar)

The House of Mahawangsa (Malay: Wangsa Mahawangsa) is the hereditary royal dynasty that has ruled the Sultanate of Kedah in northern Peninsular Malaysia for nearly nine centuries. Tradition claims descent from the legendary figure Raja Merong Mahawangsa, whose saga appears in the classical Malay text Hikayat Merong Mahawangsa. According to historical records, the documented line begins with Sultan Mudzafar Shah I, who ascended the throne in 1136 CE, marking Kedah’s formal conversion to Islam and the start of its sultanate era.

Over the centuries the dynasty has steered Kedah through Hindu-Buddhist rule, expansive Indian Ocean trade, Siamese suzerainty, British protection, Japanese occupation, and into Malaysia’s post-independence era. The house remains active today and plays a constitutional, symbolic, and cultural role in the state.

== Origins ==
=== Foundation ===
The legend of Raja Merong Mahawangsa describes a prince of foreign origin who landed in Kedah and established rule, linking the dynasty to ancient maritime networks and classical world mythologies. While the story is best understood as foundational myth, archaeological evidence from the Bujang Valley indicates that Kedah was indeed a major maritime and cultural hub in the early centuries CE.

=== Etymology ===
The name “Mahawangsa” is derived from Sanskrit and Malay roots meaning “great bird” or “great swan”, symbolising royal authority and divine sanction in early Malay political culture.

== Historical Development ==
=== Hindu-Buddhist Period ===
Prior to the 12th century, Kedah is documented as a polity with Hindu-Buddhist influence, trading with India, China, and the Arab world. The ruling house, in its legendary form, reflects those cultural intersections.

=== Islamisation and Sultanate era (1136 CE onward) ===
In 1136 CE, Raja Merong Mahawangsa’s descendant, Sultan Mudzafar Shah I ibni Merong Mahawangsa, converted to Islam by Sheikh Abdullah ibn Ja'afar Quamiri and re-styled his kingdom as the Sultanate of Kedah. This change marked a major shift in religious and political identity and anchored the dynasty in the Islamic Malay world.

From the 17th to early 19th centuries the Sultanate of Kedah navigated relationships with regional powers such as the Kingdom of Ayutthaya (Siam), and later agreements with the British. The dynasty maintained a measure of sovereignty while adapting to external pressures.

=== Constitutional era ===
After World War II and the formation of the Federation of Malaya in 1948 (later Malaysia in 1963), the Sultanate entered a modern constitutional role. The dynasty’s international prominence was elevated when Sultan Abdul Halim Mu’adzam Shah served two separate terms as Malaysia’s King (Yang di-Pertuan Agong).

== Line of Rulers ==
=== Legendary line (pre-1136) ===
- Raja Merong Mahawangsa
- Raja Merong Mahapudisat
- Raja Seri Mahawangsa I
- Raja Seri Mahawangsa II
- Phra Ong Mahawangsa

=== Islamic Sultanate line (1136–present) ===
1. Sultan Mudzafar Shah I
2. Sultan Mu’adzam Shah ibni Sultan Mudzafar Shah I
3. Sultan Muhammad Shah ibni Sultan Mu’adzam Shah
4. Sultan Mudzafar Shah II ibni Sultan Muhammad Shah
5. Sultan Mahmud Shah I ibni Sultan Mudzafar Shah II
6. Sultan Ibrahim Shah ibni Sultan Mahmud Shah I
7. Sultan Sulaiman Shah I ibni Sultan Ibrahim Shah
8. Sultan Ataullah Muhammad Shah I ibni Sultan Sulaiman Shah I
9. Sultan Muhammad Jiwa Zainal Adilin Mu’adzam Shah I ibni Sultan Ataullah Muhammad Shah I
10. Sultan Mahmud Shah II ibni Sultan Muhammad Jiwa Zainal Adilin Mu’adzam Shah I
11. Sultan Mudzafar Shah III ibni Sultan Mahmud Shah II
12. Sultan Sulaiman Shah II ibni Sultan Mudzafar Shah III
13. Sultan Rijaluddin Muhammad Shah ibni Sultan Sulaiman Shah II
14. Sultan Muhyiddin Mansor Shah ibni Sultan Rijaluddin Muhammad Shah
15. Sultan Ataullah Muhammad Shah II ibni Sultan Muhyiddin Mansor Shah
16. Sultan Dziaddin Mukarram Shah I ibni Sultan Ataullah Muhammad Shah II
17. Sultan Muhammad Jiwa Zainal Adilin Mu’adzam Shah II ibni Sultan Dziaddin Mukarram Shah I
18. Sultan Abdullah Mukarram Shah ibni Sultan Muhammad Jiwa Zainal Adilin Mu’adzam Shah II
19. Sultan Dziaddin Mukarram Shah II ibni Sultan Abdullah Mukarram Shah
20. Sultan Ahmad Tajuddin Halim Shah II ibni Sultan Abdullah Mukarram Shah
21. Sultan Zainal Rashid Mu’adzam Shah I ibni Sultan Ahmad Tajuddin Halim Shah II
22. Sultan Ahmad Tajuddin Mukarram Shah ibni Sultan Zainal Rashid Mu’adzam Shah I
23. Sultan Abdul Hamid Halim Shah ibni Sultan Ahmad Tajuddin Mukarram Shah
24. Sultan Badlishah ibni Sultan Abdul Hamid Halim Shah
25. Sultan Abdul Halim Mu’adzam Shah ibni Sultan Badlishah
26. Sultan Sallehuddin ibni Almarhum Sultan Badlishah (current)

== Roles ==
The House of Mahawangsa remains deeply embedded in Kedah’s culture and governance. The Sultan of Kedah is considered the Head of Islam in the state and participates in national ceremonial duties including the Conference of Rulers of Malaysia. Court traditions such as the royal orchestra (Nobat), investiture ceremonies, and royal regalia like the Keris Kedah persist as living heritage.

== Palaces and Residences ==
Major royal residences include:

- Istana Anak Bukit, the official residence of the Sultan in Alor Setar
- Istana Kota Setar, the historic palace complex, now partly a museum

== Religion ==
The dynasty practices Sunni Islam under the Shāfiʽī school. Prior to conversion, the region practiced forms of Hindu-Buddhism as evidenced by early temples and inscriptions.
