= Kedah State Zakat Board =

Organization based in Alor Setar, Kedah, Malaysia

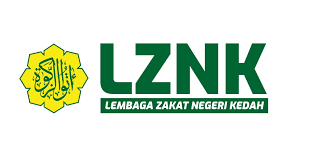
- Native name: Lembaga Zakat Negeri Kedah
- Headquarters: Alor Setar, Kedah, Malaysia
- Key people: (CEO)|Dato' Syeikh Zakaria Bin Othman
- Services: Collection and Distribution of Zakat
- Website: Official website (in Malay)

The Kedah State Zakat Board (Malay: Lembaga Zakat Negeri Kedah; abbreviated as LZNK), acts as the trustee for Ulil Amri, the Sultan of Kedah. LZNK is an institution responsible for the oversight of zakat collection and distribution in the state of Kedah, Malaysia. Established on 5 September 1936, as indicated in the Notice Advising the Relevant Regulations on zakat matters. This notice was issued by the Office of the Sheikhul Islam through the Majmaul Sheikhul Islam, comprising Haji Ismail B Hj Mohd Saleh, Haji Yaakob Bin Hj Ahmad, and Haji Abdul Ghani B Hj Awang, officially founded in 1936 to succeed the position of Sheikhul Islam, which had existed since 1901.

In 1955, the Enactment of the Jabatan Zakat Negeri Kedah Darul Aman established zakat laws, requiring a full payment of zakat on paddy (rice) at a rate of 100% or 8/8 to the appointed amil (collector). Consequently, zakat collection predominantly focused on paddy for an extended period.

A significant development occurred in 2015 when Sultan Abdul Halim Mu'adzam Shah Ibni Almarhum Sultan Badlishah approved the Kedah State Zakat Board Enactment 2015 for presentation in the Kedah Darul Aman State Assembly. Following the assembly's consent, the enactment was gazetted on 31 December 2015, with approval from the Kedah Sultan's Regents, namely Sultan Sallehuddin Sultan Badlishah, Tan Sri Tunku Abdul Hamid Thani Sultan Badlishah, and Tunku Panglima Besar, Tan Sri Tunku Puteri Intan Safinaz. LZNK, under this new enactment, is committed to advancing its vision and mission as a world-class zakat management institution.

Zakat management in the State of Kedah is regulated by Enactment 23, known as the Kedah Darul Aman Zakat Board Enactment. This legal framework, established through reform, grants authority to the Kedah Zakat Board for the collection and distribution of zakat in the State of Kedah. The governance structure of the Kedah State Zakat Board is overseen by His Majesty the Sultan of Kedah, who holds the ultimate authority.

The Kedah State Zakat Board is under the administration of Chief Executive Officer Dato' Syeikh Zakaria Othman. Board members, who report directly to His Majesty the Sultan of Kedah, monitor the CEO's activities. The governance structure is further supported by two key sectors, namely the Deputy Chief Executive Officer (Administration) and Deputy Chief Executive Officer (Operations).

According to the provisions of the Kedah State Zakat Board Enactment 2015, the Chief Executive Officer must possess a first-degree background in Islamic studies. The CEO, in addition to overseeing zakat-related activities, serves as the Secretary of the Kedah State Zakat Board. The chairman of the Board holds the position of the State Secretary of Kedah. This organizational structure ensures a systematic and accountable approach to zakat management in the state.

== History ==
Muhammad said there was an obligation to pay zakat in the second year of Hijrah, marking the division of the practice of zakat into the Mecca and the Medina phases. The initial stage of zakat development spanned 23 years, during which the Badawi community in Mecca implemented a system of contributing properties to support the needy. It is noteworthy that specialized zakat management institutions were not established during the first 13 years of this period.

"...Take alms (prescribed or voluntary) out of their wealth so that you (O Messenger) may thereby cleanse them and cause them to grow in purity and sincerity, and pray for them. Indeed your prayer is a source of comfort for them. God is All-Hearing, All-Knowing.." (Surah al-Taubah verse 103)

The Qur'an emphasizes the concept of zakat 30 times, highlighting its significance alongside prayers, mentioned 27 times. This underscores the parallel nature of the obligation to pay zakat with other fundamental acts of worship such as prayer and fasting. Muhammad initiated a systematic zakat management system, appointing amils (collectors) to facilitate the collection and distribution of zakat. This approach achieved success owing to the unwavering faith and strong beliefs of the community.

"The charity collector of the Prophet came to us. So he took the charity from our rich to our poor. I was a orphan boy, so he came to me and gave me a young she-camel from it." (Sunan Tirmidzi, Kitab Zakat, Hadis No. 649)

The success of this system can be attributed to the stringent selection conditions and systematic methods employed in the collection and distribution of zakat funds. These measures ensured that the proceeds were efficiently channeled to the local asnaf (beneficiaries), aligning with the principles of fairness and accountability in zakat management.

=== During the Era of Khulafa' Al-Rasyidin ===
After the death of Muhammad, the practice of paying zakat persisted under the leadership the first for caliphs, Sayidina Abu Bakar, Umar al-Khattab, Uthman Affan, and Ali Abi Talib. Throughout their leadership, there were no significant alterations to the fundamental laws governing zakat, such as the determination of nisab (minimum wealth threshold), the classification of asnaf groups (categories of zakat recipients), and the distribution mechanisms of zakat. Administrative changes and adjustments to the types of zakat properties imposed on Muslims were made in response to contemporary economic factors.

Abu Bakar, the first caliph, played a pivotal role in reinforcing zakat payments. He addressed Badawi groups who were reluctant to pay zakat, perceiving it as burdensome. The zakat funds collected were utilized to enhance socio-economic and spiritual integration among the poor and rich. Caliph Abu Bakar introduced changes, including the imposition of zakat on livestock, and initiated the construction of a storage room for state revenues. Additionally, he established a special room dedicated to storing the state's revenues. These measures aimed at ensuring effective administration and distribution of zakat in response to the evolving economic landscape during that period.

Saidina Umar al-Khattab, the second caliph, made notable advancements in zakat management by instituting laws grounded in social realities. Under his leadership, he established Bayt al-mal, a dedicated department tasked with managing government revenues. To address the needs of travelers facing financial constraints, he introduced Dar Ad Daqiq, commonly known as the "House of Wheat," aimed at providing food supplies to those in need.

The establishment of al-Diwan, an administrative body, resulted in effective governance and the prevention of surplus zakat funds. To enhance the stability of zakat administration, amils (collectors) were appointed to permanent positions with regular salaries. The underlying concept behind zakat distribution, as conceived by Saidina Umar, was to elevate recipients from poverty to prosperity, transforming them into zakat payers. This innovative approach not only ensured the absence of surplus zakat funds but also contributed to the alleviation of poverty within the community.

During Caliph Saidina Uthman Ibn Affan's reign, he implemented measures to improve living standards and bridge the socio-economic gap by increasing the rate of assistance for the asnafs (categories of zakat recipients). Notably, he introduced two categories for zakat: zakat on apparent wealth and zakat on non-apparent wealth. Zakat on non-apparent wealth pertains to assets that cannot be directly discerned, while zakat on apparent wealth involves property assessed by an amil (collector). To ensure comprehensive distribution, the government collected all types of zakat under this system.

Subsequently, during the reign of Saidina Ali Bin Abi Talib, the focus shifted towards monitoring the behavior of zakat collectors. This emphasis on oversight aimed at ensuring the welfare of the recipients and preventing any form of coercion in the zakat collection and distribution processes. Saidina Ali's administration prioritized ethical conduct in zakat management, reflecting a commitment to the well-being and fair treatment of the community members.

=== The Advent of Islam in the State of Kedah ===
The introduction of Islam to Kedah commenced in the 9th century AD, with the official acceptance of the religion occurring in 1136 AD. Kedah served as a prominent stop for traders and merchants from Arabia, Persia, and India, who not only engaged in commerce but also played a crucial role in disseminating Islam to the regions they visited. The historical records indicate that Kedah was referred to by various names, including Qadah (Arab), Keit-cha (Chinese), and Queda (Western).

According to historians, the formal adoption of Islam by Kedah took place in 1136 AD, corresponding to 531 Hijri, during the reign of Maharaja Derbar Raja II. This significant event marked the official embrace of Islam by the state and reflected the cultural and commercial interactions that contributed to the spread of the Islamic faith in the region.

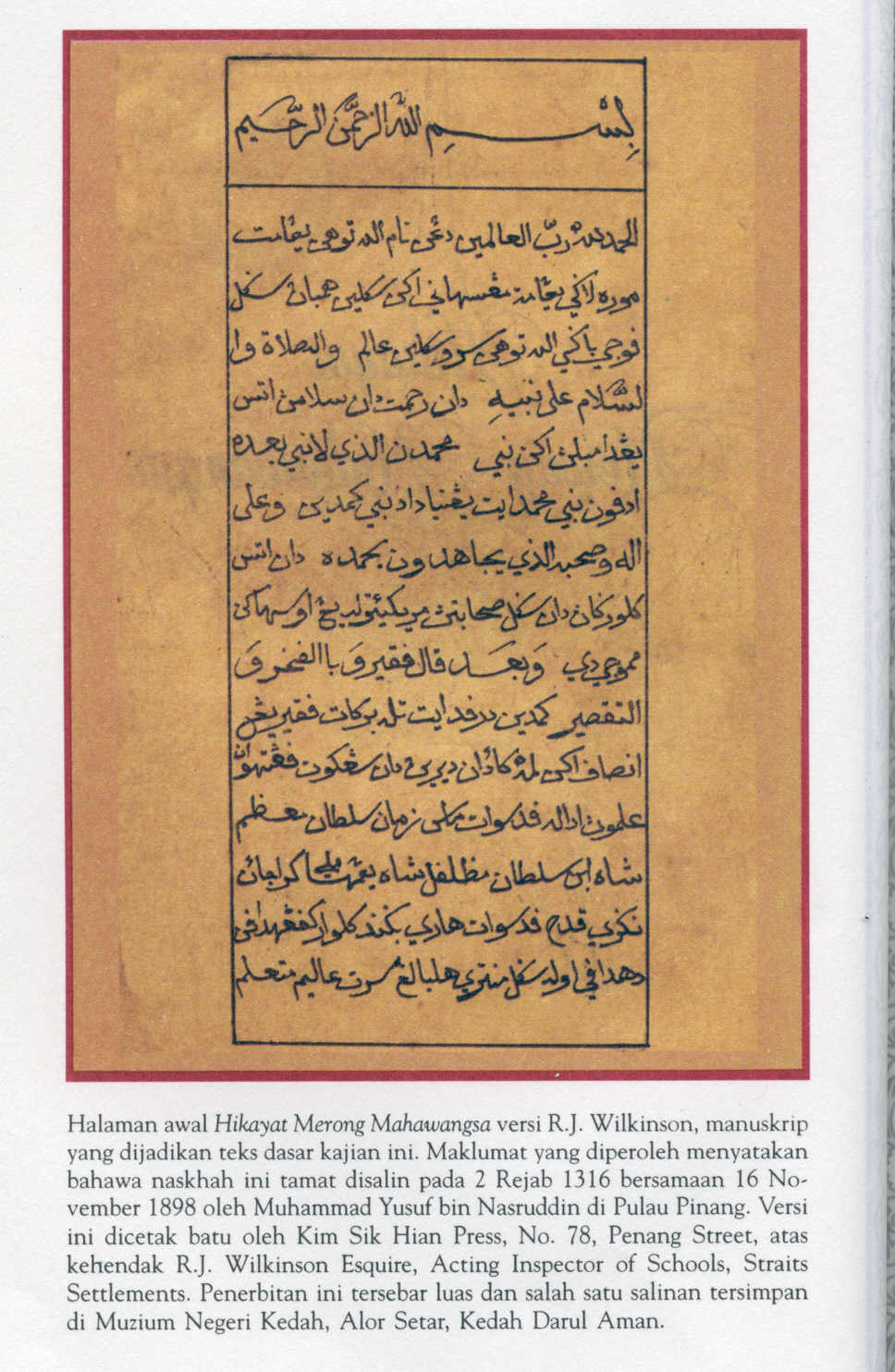
Hikayat Merong Mahawangsa in Jawi text

The evidence pointing to the arrival of Islam in Kedah is substantiated by several factors, including the establishment of religious study huts, the introduction of silver currency, and records of Islamic preachers. The history of Islam's penetration into Kedah is closely associated with the endeavors of Sheikh Abdullah Al Yamani, a Yemeni scholar, who played a pivotal role in converting Maharaja Derbar Raja II. The ruler, upon embracing Islam, adopted the name Sultan Muzaffar Shah. Sheikh Abdullah not only served as Sultan Muzaffar Shah's religious teacher but was also appointed as his advisor in religious, legal, and state affairs in Kedah.

Following his conversion to Islam, as documented in the Hikayat Merong Mahawangsa, Sultan Muzaffar Shah conveyed to the people of Kedah the imperative to perform prayers and fulfill their obligation of zakat fitrah (a specific type of obligatory alms). This historical account highlights the significant role of religious leaders and scholars in the propagation and establishment of Islam in Kedah.

"And enforcing all the subjects of the state to make prayers 5 times, and fast in the month of Ramadan, and pay zakat fitrah to each district, and for mosque items that are damaged, it is ordered for them to be repaired, as well as for all items that do not come under the purview of the law of God Almighty". (Hikayat Merong Mahawangsa, page 111)

During the reign of the 12th Sultan of Kedah, Sultan Sulaiman Shah, a ruler known for his religious focus, he appointed a distinguished scholar (ulama) named Syarif Aznan to provide counsel on avoiding potential attacks from Aceh. Sultan Sulaiman Shah, acknowledged as the "Shadow of God," actively sought the guidance of religious scholars for the administration of his kingdom. This collaborative approach reflects the importance of religious insight in the governance and strategic decision-making processes during his rule.

The influence of religious elements in the administration of Kedah is further exemplified by ancient writings, including the Canon Law (Malay: Hukum Kanun) or Kedah Law, authored in 1650 AD / 1060 Hijri. These legal codes, written during various sultanates, demonstrate the integration of religious principles into the legal and administrative frameworks of the state. The emphasis on seeking advice from religious scholars and the presence of religiously-oriented legal writings underscore the significant role of Islam in shaping the governance and policies of Kedah during different sultanates.

== Legislative developments ==
=== Legislation in Kedah Law - Ku Din Ku Meh Version ===
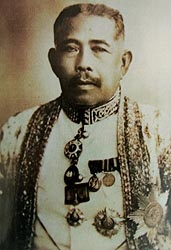
Tunku Baharuddin bin Ku Meh, the last King of Setul - 1902

The Ku Din Ku Meh version of the Kedah Law, believed to have been written between 1625 AD and 1651 AD, stands as a significant historical document and is considered one of the oldest instances of zakat legislation in the state. This legal text outlines the religious obligations of citizens, including the performance of five daily prayers, Friday prayers, payment of zakat and fitrah, and observing fasting during the month of Ramadan. It emphasizes the importance of adhering to Islamic practices and contributing to the welfare of the community.

Specifically addressing zakat, the law mandates officers to distribute zakat fitrah to the poor in accordance with the guidance of God. Additionally, the law stipulates the distribution of fitrah to the poor and the allocation of fitrah to mosques. Notably, it requires individuals to pay zakat for their buffaloes, indicating a comprehensive approach to zakat legislation that covers various aspects of wealth and property.

While the exact dates of the Ku Din Ku Meh version of the Kedah Law remain unknown, its existence suggests that zakat legislation in the state of Kedah has a longstanding history, predating the era of independence. This underscores the enduring role of zakat in the legal and religious fabric of Kedah over several centuries.

=== Legislation in Tembera Dato' Seri Paduka Tuan (1667 AD) ===
Tembera Dato' Seri Paduka Tuan, completed in 1667 AD, stands as a historical document commissioned by Sultan Dhiauddin Mukarram Shah I (1626–1652) to codify the administrative legislation of Kedah. The term "Tembera" signifies 'of law,' and this designation was introduced by R.O Windstedt, who later popularized the term. Sultan Dhiauddin Mukarram Shah I, the 15th Sultan of Kedah, who resided in Kota Palas, directed the creation of the Tembera Dato' Seri Paduka Tuan. The legislative document was authored by Dato' Seri Paduka Tuan, alongside Syeikh Alauddin and other preachers.

The Tembera Dato' Paduka Tuan comprises 16 clauses outlining punishments for various offences, including theft, robbery, opium smoking, addiction, gambling, and alcohol consumption. Additionally, the legislation provides guidelines for policemen, farmers, livestock management, cockfighting, and animal trading without approval from village heads. While the king's name is not explicitly mentioned in the legislation, historical context suggests that it was authored by Sultan Dhiauddin Mukarram Shah I. This document serves as a valuable testament to the legal and administrative practices of Kedah during that period.

In the year 1078 Hijri, His Majesty Maulana Shah Alam issued a command to his senior officers to enact laws, leading to the establishment of the Tembera Dato 'Seri Paduka Tuan. This legal document dictated that farmers cultivating paddy fields or hill paddy (huma) were required to pay agricultural zakat at a rate of one-tenth of their gold yield. Refusal to comply with this obligation would grant the penghulu (village head) the Sultan's consent to enforce stern actions. This directive aligns with the principles outlined in the Words of God in Surah At-Taubah verse 103, which encourages charity and invokes God's blessings upon the people.

The Tembera Dato' Seri Paduka Tuan also references the introduction of an 8-sided currency made of a silver and copper mixture during the reign of Sultan Dhiauddin Mukarram Shah I. This historical legislation not only illustrates the integration of zakat as a financial obligation but also reflects the development of currency under the administration of Sultan Dhiauddin Mukarram Shah I in the historical context of Kedah.

=== The Assembly of Zakat and Alms of the Muslims of Kedah 1936 AD ===
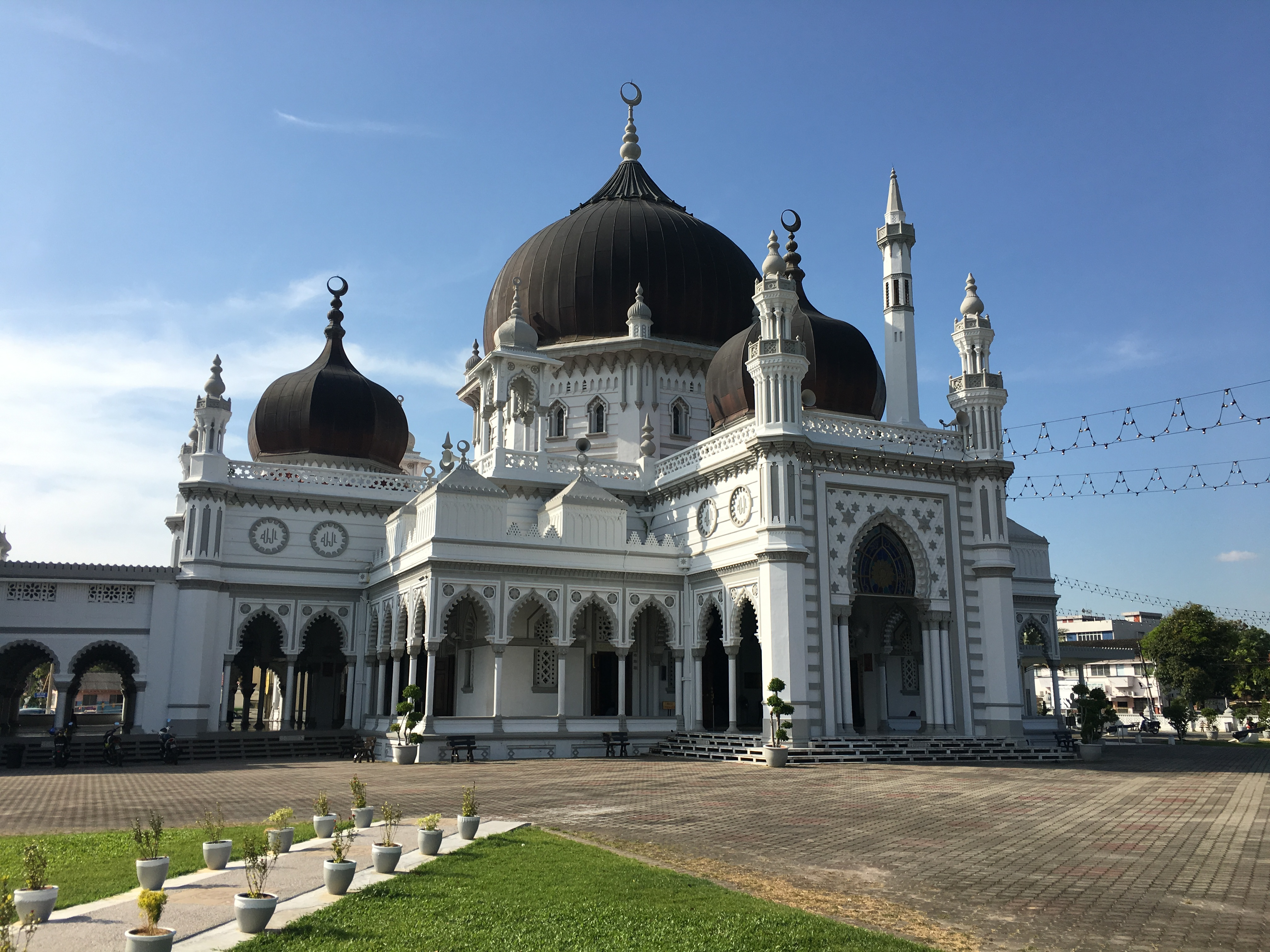
The Zahir Mosque (Masjid Zahir) in Alor Setar, Kota Setar, Kedah, Malaysia.

In 1936, marking two centuries after the composition of Tembera Seri Paduka Tuan, a notice was issued in Kedah instructing the public to give zakat as a religious practice in the state. This notice, titled "I'lan An Nasihah Min Khusus Az Zakat," which translates to "Notice to Advise Provisions Relating to the matter of zakat," was disseminated to the public. Complaints were subsequently raised regarding the perceived inadequate and inequitable distribution of zakat funds.

In response to these concerns, Tunku Mahmud Ibni Al-Marhum Sultan Ahmad Tajuddin, the acting Sultan at the time, took decisive action. He ordered three scholars to formulate a law governing zakat in Kedah. Tajuddin's deep commitment to religion and his love for its principles led to the establishment of Al-Maahad Al-Mahmud, a religious school with numerous branches that produced esteemed scholars. Additionally, he played a pivotal role in the establishment of Masjid Zahir, a magnificent mosque in Alor Setar, which stands as a landmark in Kedah. Tajuddin's efforts not only addressed concerns about zakat distribution but also contributed significantly to the religious and educational landscape of Kedah.

== Organization and administration ==
=== Under the Enactment of Kedah State Zakat Committee 1955 ===
In 1955, the Kedah State Zakat Committee Enactment 1955 received approval from His Majesty Sultan Badlishah Ibni Almarhum Sultan Abdul Hamid Halim Shah. This enactment empowered Ulil Amri to collect and distribute zakat in the state. This zakat administration continued for 60 years until the approval of the Kedah State Zakat Board Enactment 2015. To streamline zakat operations, the Zakat Regulations 1982 were introduced. Over the years, several amendments were made to the law, including changing the term "Zakat Komiti" to "Jawatankuasa Zakat" (Zakat Committee), adjusting the Zakat Collection from 4/8 to 8/8, replacing the term "Rial" with "Wang" (Money), changing the punishment from "RM100 or imprisonment not exceeding 6 months" to "RM5,000 or imprisonment not exceeding 3 years," adding sections 10 to 25 to the Zakat Enactment, and renaming the Zakat Law to the Zakat Enactment.

A significant undertaking during this era of zakat management was the construction of the 11-storey Menara Zakat (Zakat Tower) in Kedah, Malaysia. The land, previously used for temporary shelter for Muslim converts, was acquired by the Zakat Committee in 1963 for RM80,000. Recognizing its potential to enhance zakat finance, a Development Sub-Committee was established. Completed in 1992 with a budget of approximately RM10 million, the building was designed by Associate Professor Ilyas Haji Saleh. The name Menara Zakat was agreed upon by His Royal Highness Tuanku Sultan, further highlighting its significance in the realm of zakat administration.

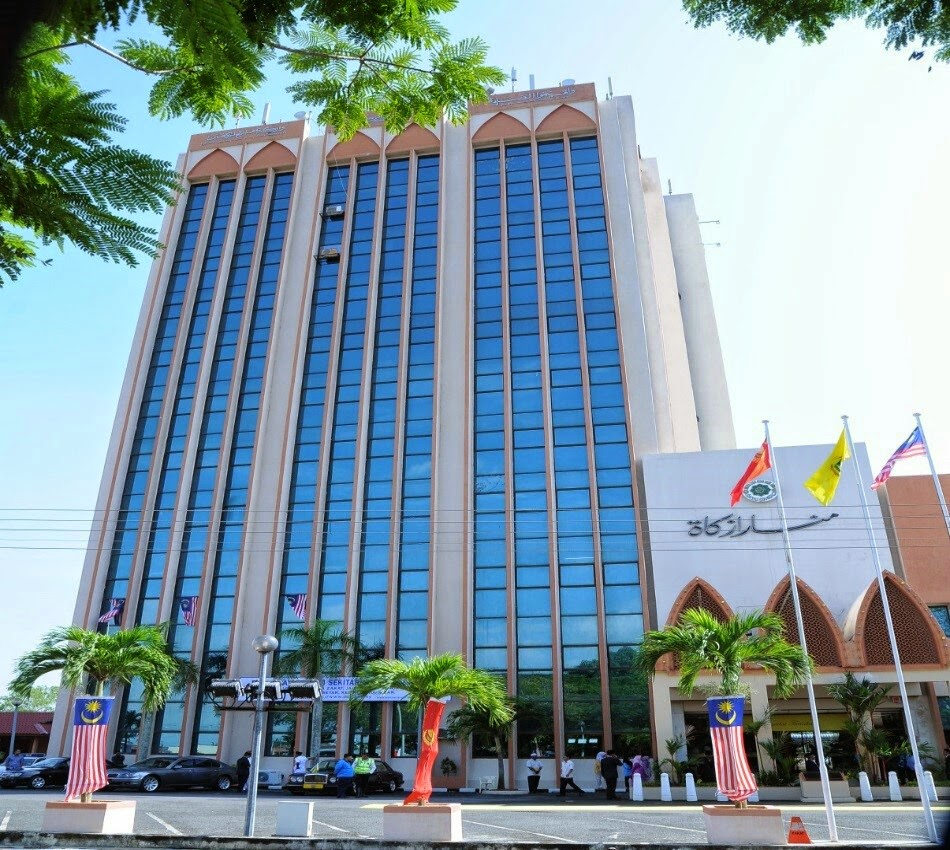
Consisting of eleven floors, Menara Zakat (Zakat Tower) serves as the HQ for the operation of the Kedah State Zakat Board.

The philosophy behind the establishment of the eleven-floor Menara Zakat, with the zakat handling office located on the third floor, serves to symbolize the significance of zakat as the third pillar among the Five Pillars of Islam. This thoughtful design reflects three underlying considerations:

1. The combination of Rukun Iman (six elements) and Rukun Islam (five elements), totals to eleven.
2. The combination of the third pillar of zakat with the asnafs who are entitled to receive zakat, also totals up to eleven.
3. Eleven is also associated with the eleven districts in the state of Kedah.

In essence, the thoughtful design of the Menara Zakat aims to convey a deeper understanding of the role and importance of zakat within the framework of Islam, incorporating both theological and local contextual elements.

The construction of Menara Zakat, a tower, commenced in 1986 using surplus zakat funds. Despite unsuccessful attempts to secure strategic partners, foreign funding, and loans, the project was eventually resumed with an interest-free loan of RM2.7 million from the Federal Government and the Kedah Darul Aman State government. The repayment period was set at 10 years, with a cooling-off period for the first 3 years post-construction. The rent collected from the tower was then distributed to eight categories of asnaf, making Menara Zakat a valuable asset for Muslims in Kedah Darul Aman.

Under the management of the Kedah Islamic Religious Council, several facilities, including the Kedah Zakat Hemodialysis Centre, Kedah Zakat Sewing Skills Centre, and Pusat Saudara Baru (PUSBA), are sustained through funds allocated to muallaf asnaf. In the early 1980s, Dato' Shaikh Mahmood Bin Haji Ismail Naim explored new avenues for zakat collection in Kedah, expanding the focus to encompass business, property, and salary zakat. The Kedah State Zakat Committee actively organizes muzakarah sessions and seminars to develop new laws pertaining to zakat collection and distribution.

A notable achievement for Kedah was becoming the first state in Malaysia to issue a fatwa on income zakat obligation in 1986, based on the Kedah Islamic Religious Administration Enactment 1962 No. 9. This fatwa also addressed the Employees Provident Fund (EPF) Zakat fatwa on February 11, 1985, stating that if an employee's nisab is sufficient, their zakat must be paid off. Zakat can be issued at the time of receipt of savings, calculated from the date the savings are completed, provided there is sufficient nisab. This reflects Kedah's commitment to ensuring a comprehensive and just approach to zakat collection and distribution.

=== List of Committee Chairpersons/Kedah State Zakat Board ===
The zakat committee in Kedah underwent a significant transition in 1957, when the leadership structure was altered. Initially, the committee was headed by relatives and trustees appointed by His Majesty the Sultan of Kedah. However, from 1957 onwards, a notable change occurred, and the chairman of the zakat committee became the Kedah State Secretary. This change in leadership structure likely reflects an institutional shift, aligning the management of zakat affairs more closely with the administrative apparatus of the state government.

No	Name	Year
1	Duli Yang Maha Mulia Tunku Mahmud Ibnu Marhum Sultan Ahmad Tajuddin Mukarram Shah	1361 H / 1942 AD
2	Duli Yang Maha Mulia Tuanku Sultan Badlishah Ibnu Al Marhum Sultan Abdul Hamid Halim Shah	1362 H / 1943 AD
3	Yang Teramat Mulia Tunku Yaakob Ibni Al Marhum Sultan Abdul Hamid Halim Shah	1363 H / 1944 AD
4	Tuan Sheikh Mahmud (Majmu' Sheikhul Islam Chairperson)	1370 H / 1951 AD
5	Yang Teramat Mulia Tunku Ahmad Tajuddin Ibnu mar-hum Tunku Mahmud (Tunku Seri Maharajalela)	1375 H / 1955 AD
6	Dato' Syed Hassan Bin Syed Zain Shahabudin (State Secretary of Kedah Darul Aman)	1377 H / 1957 AD
7	Tun Azmi Bin Haji Mohamad (State Secretary of Kedah Darul Aman)	1378 H / 1958 AD
8	Dato' Shuib Bin Osman (Dato' Paduka Seri Indera) (State Secretary of Kedah Darul Aman)	1380 H / 1960 AD
9	Dato' Paduka Hj Shaari Bin Muhammad Daud (Dato' Paduka Seri Indera) (State Secretary of Kedah Darul Aman)	1389 H / 1969 AD
10	Dato' Paduka Haji Radzi Bin Basir (Dato' Bijaya Indera) (State Secretary of Kedah Darul Aman)	1396 H / 1976 AD
11	Dato' Paduka Haji Syed Mansor Bin Syed Kassim Barak-bah (Dato Jaya Pahlawan) (State Secretary of Kedah Darul Aman)	1407 H / 1986 AD
12	Dato' Paduka Haji Mohd Saad Bin Endut (Dato' Indera Senggara) (State Secretary of Kedah Darul Aman)	1410 H / 1989 AD
13	Dato' Paduka Haji Ahmad Basri Bin Muhammad Akil (Dato'Lela Pahlawan) (State Secretary of Kedah Darul Aman)	1413 H / 1992 AD
14	Dato' Haji Ismail Bin Tan Sri Haji Shafie (State Secretary of Kedah Darul Aman)	1416 H / 1995 AD
15	Dato' Wira Ku Nahar Bin Ku Ibrahim (State Secretary of Kedah Darul Aman)	1423 H / 2002 AD
16	Dato' Bijaya Indera Haji Syed Unan Al Mashri Bin Syed Abdullah (State Secretary of Kedah Darul Aman)	1424 H / 2003 AD
17	Dato Seraja Setia Dato' Paduka Haji Rasli Bin Basir (State Secretary of Kedah Darul Aman)	1429 H / 2008 AD
18	Dato' Jaya Budiman Dato Paduka Haji Mohd Puat Bin Mohd Ali (State Secretary of Kedah Darul Aman)	1435 H / 2013 AD
19	Dato' Paduka Haji Bakar Bin Din (State Secretary of Kedah Darul Aman)	1437 H / 2015 AD
20	Dato' Paduka Ammar bin Dato' Sheikh Mahmud Naim (State Secretary of Kedah Darul Aman)	1437 H / 2016 AD
21	Dato' Seri Norizan Bin Khazali (State Secretary of Kedah Darul Aman)	1444 H / 2023 AD

=== List of Committee Secretaries/Kedah State Zakat Committee ===
The Secretary of the Kedah State Zakat Committee is appointed from the pool of retired Kedah State Administrative Officers (Kedah Civil Services). Dato' Shaikh Mahmood Ismail Naim served in this role until 1984. Following his tenure, the position was initially offered to Dato' Mustafa Mansor after his appointment as the Chairman of the Kedah State Public Service Commission, but he declined the offer. Subsequently, since that time, the Secretary has been appointed from individuals with backgrounds in religious education, as mandated by the LZNK Enactment 2015. This reflects a deliberate shift in the qualifications and expertise required for the role, emphasizing the importance of religious knowledge in the administration of zakat affairs in Kedah.

No	Name	Year
1	Encik Muhammad Isa Bin Abdullah	1361 H /1942 AD
2	Wan Mahmud Bin Wan Abdul Hamid	1375 H /1955 AD
3	Haji Zakaria Bin Muhammad Daud	1375 H /1955 AD
4	Haji Ahmad Bin Haji Yasin	1378 H /1958 AD
5	Encik Hassan Bin Shuib	1385 H /1965 AD
6	Encik Hassan Bin Shuib	1370 H /1970 AD
7	Dato' Wan Daud Bin Wan Ali (Dato' Setia DiRaja)	1391 H /1971 AD
8	Dato' Wan Anuar Bin Wan Ishak (Dato' Jaya Budiman)	1397 H /1977 AD
9	Dato' Shaikh Mahmood Bin Haji Ismail Naim	1404 H /1984 AD
10	Dato' Sheikh Ghazali Bin Haji Yaakob	1419 H /1998 AD
11	Dato' Syeikh Zakaria Bin Othman	1438 H /2017 AD

=== Under the Enactment of Kedah State Zakat Board 2015 ===
In 2015, Sultan Abdul Halim Mu'adzam Shah Ibni Almarhum Sultan Badlishah granted approval for the Kedah Darul Aman Zakat Board Enactment 2015. This enactment was officially gazetted on December 31, 2015, following the consent of the Kedah Sultan's Regents. The legislation empowered the Kedah Zakat Board to collect and distribute zakat in the State of Kedah Darul Aman. The Board operates under the administration of a Chief Executive Officer, monitored by Board members who, in turn, report directly to the Sultan.

Under this new management era, the Kedah State Zakat Board (LZNK) has implemented reforms to ensure that affluent Muslims pay zakat based on actual assessment, thereby alleviating the burden on the less privileged and fostering continued zakat contributions from the affluent to the LZNK. The LZNK is actively progressing towards becoming a prominent global Islamic social financial institution.The Chief Executive Officer spearheads the board's operations, with support from two key sectors: the Deputy Chief Executive Officer of Administration and the Deputy Chief Executive Officer of Operations. This organizational structure reflects the commitment to effective and transparent zakat management in the state of Kedah.

=== List of Kedah State Zakat Board Chairpersons ===
The Kedah State Zakat Board had its initial chairperson in the person of Dato' Paduka Haji Bakar Bin Din. Subsequently, he was succeeded by Dato' Paduka Ammar Bin Dato' Shaikh Mahmood Naim, who is the son of Dato' Shaikh Mahmood Bin Haji Ismail Naim. This succession reflects a continuity in leadership within the zakat management structure in Kedah, possibly highlighting a tradition of knowledge and experience being passed down within the leadership of the Kedah State Zakat Board.

No	Name	Year
1	Dato' Paduka Haji Bakar Bin Din (Kedah State Government Secretary	Jan 2016 - Dec 2018
2	Dato' Paduka Ammar Bin Dato' Shaikh Mahmood Naim (Kedah State Government Secretary	Dec 2019 - Dec 2022
3	Dato' Seri Haji Norizan Bin Khazali (Kedah Darul Aman State Secretary)	Dec 2022–Present

=== List of Kedah State Zakat Board Chief Executive Officers ===
Dato' Sheikh Zakaria Othman assumed the role of the first Chief Executive Officer of the Kedah State Zakat Board, succeeding Dato' Sheikh Ghazali Bin Haji Yaacob, who concluded his service at the age of 77. Sheikh Zakaria Othman's appointment was facilitated through a two- year secondment from INSANIAH University College. This arrangement indicates a collaborative effort between the Kedah State Zakat Board and the university, showcasing a commitment to drawing expertise from various sources to enhance the effectiveness of zakat management in the state.

No	Name	Year
1	Dato' Syeikh Ghazali Bin Haji Yaacob	1 Jan 2016 - 31 March 2017
2	Dato' Syeikh Zakaria Bin Othman	2 April 2017 – present
