= 1506 =

1506 in various calendars
- Gregorian calendar: 1506; MDVI
- Ab urbe condita: 2259
- Armenian calendar: 955; ԹՎ ՋԾԵ
- Assyrian calendar: 6256
- Balinese saka calendar: 1427–1428
- Bengali calendar: 912–913
- Berber calendar: 2456
- English Regnal year: 21 Hen. 7 – 22 Hen. 7
- Buddhist calendar: 2050
- Burmese calendar: 868
- Byzantine calendar: 7014–7015
- Chinese calendar: 乙丑年 (Wood Ox); 4203 or 3996 — to — 丙寅年 (Fire Tiger); 4204 or 3997
- Coptic calendar: 1222–1223
- Discordian calendar: 2672
- Ethiopian calendar: 1498–1499
- Hebrew calendar: 5266–5267
- Hindu calendars
- Vikram Samvat: 1562–1563
- Shaka Samvat: 1427–1428
- Kali Yuga: 4606–4607
- Holocene calendar: 11506
- Igbo calendar: 506–507
- Iranian calendar: 884–885
- Islamic calendar: 911–912
- Japanese calendar: Eishō 3 (永正３年)
- Javanese calendar: 1423–1424
- Julian calendar: 1506; MDVI
- Korean calendar: 3839
- Minguo calendar: 406 before ROC 民前406年
- Nanakshahi calendar: 38
- Thai solar calendar: 2048–2049
- Tibetan calendar: ཤིང་མོ་གླང་ལོ་ (female Wood-Ox); 1632 or 1251 or 479 — to — མེ་ཕོ་སྟག་ལོ་ (male Fire-Tiger); 1633 or 1252 or 480

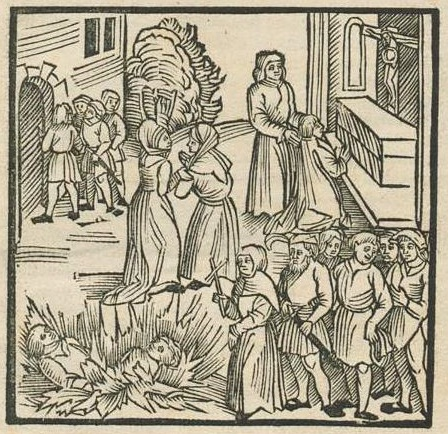
April 19: Lisbon Massacre kills thousands of Jews in Portugal over three days.

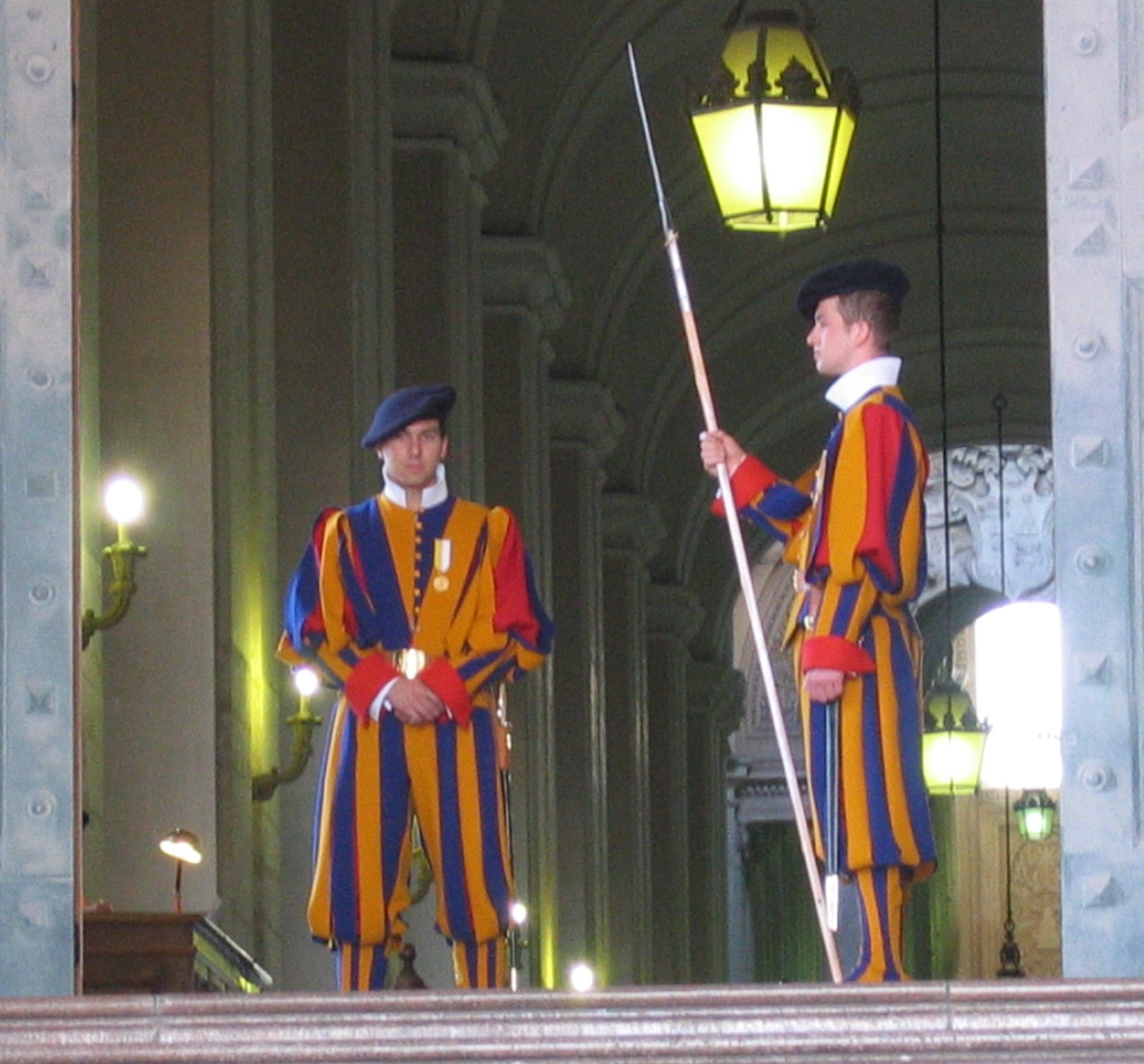
January 22: Swiss Guard arrives to protect the Vatican, remains unchanged 500 years later.

Year 1506 (MDVI) was a common year starting on Thursday of the Julian calendar.

== Events ==
=== January–March ===
- January 14 – The classical statue of Laocoön and His Sons is unearthed in Rome. On the recommendation of Giuliano da Sangallo and Michelangelo, Pope Julius II purchases it, and places it on public display in the Vatican a month later.
- January 22 – The Swiss Guard arrives at the Vatican, to serve as permanent ceremonial and palace guards under Pope Julius II.
- February 9 – Henry, Prince of Wales is made a Knight of the Golden Fleece by Maximilian I, Holy Roman Emperor.
- February 15 – Iye Roy Mackay, Chief of Scotland's Clan Mackay, records his 1504 grant of six lands in what is now the County Sutherland, and starts a feud with Euphemia II, Countess of Ross.
- March 16 – Battle of Cannanore: Portugal's fleet (commanded by Lourenço de Almeida) defeats the fleet of the Zamorin of Calicut, with hundreds of vessels involved; 3,000 Muslim troops are killed.
- March 30 – King Vladislaus II of Hungary and Maximilian I, Holy Roman Emperor sign a treaty to arrange the marriage of Vladislaus's daughter and Maximilian's son.

=== April–June ===
- April 18 – Pope Julius II lays the foundation stone of the new (current) St. Peter's Basilica in Rome, replacing the Old St. Peter's Basilica.
- April 19 – The Lisbon Massacre begins in Portugal with three days of violence, in which thousands of Jews are tortured and killed by Catholics.
- April 30 – Malus Intercursus, a treaty between King Henry VII of England and Duke Philip the Handsome of Burgundy, is signed.
- May 4 – Badi' al-Zaman Mirza becomes the new Emir of the Timurid Empire (now part of Afghanistan) after the death of his father, Sultan Husayn Bayqara, who died after a reign of 37 years.
- May 28 – Emperor Moctezuma II of Mexico's Aztec Empire subdues a rebellion in Zozollan, east of Achiutia, then kills the prisoners of war as a sacrifice to the gods.
- June 15 – Mahmud Shah II begins a 41-year reign as the Sultan of Kedah, a Muslim kingdom on the Malay Peninsula, on the death of his father, Adilin I.
- June 27 – The Treaty of Villafáfila is signed between Austria and Spain.

=== July–September ===
- July 12 – Philip the Handsome, Duke of Burgundy, becomes the ruler of the Spanish Kingdom of Castile with his insane wife Joanna, but reigns for only two months before dying of typhoid.
- August 6 – Battle of Kletsk: The Grand Duchy of Lithuania defeats the Tatars of the Crimean Khanate.
- August 19 – Sigismund I the Old succeeds his brother as king of Poland.
- September 2 – In Korea, Emperor Yonsangun, known for being a tyrant, is deposed in the Jungjong coup by his younger brother, who becomes King Jungjong.
- September 25 – Philip I, the first Spanish Habsburg King of Castile, dies suddenly from typhoid.

=== October–December ===
- October 6 – In Córdoba, in the Spanish kingdom of Andalusia, members of the nobility and the general public revolt against the Spanish inquisitor Diego Rodriguez de Lucero and General Inquisitor Diego de Deza. The mob liberates the people incarcerated at the Córdoba prison.
- October 7 – Pope Julius II issues a bull excommunicating Giovanni II Bentivoglio from the Roman Catholic Church, who had dominated the Italian city state of Bologna.
- October 15 – Charles II, the six-year-old son of King Philip of Castile, inherits his father's title of Duke of Burgundy and is proclaimed "Lord of the Netherlands".
- November 6 – Pope Julius II personally leads his troops into Bologna, retaking the city from the excommunicated tyrant Giovanni II Bentivoglio.
- December 8 – Sigismund I the Old (Zygmunt Jagiellon), younger brother of the late Alexander Jagiellon, becomes the King of Poland and (as Zygimantas II) the Grand Duke of Lithuania. He will reign for more than 40 years, dying in 1548 at the age of 81.

=== Date unknown ===
- The Portuguese mariner Tristão da Cunha sights the islands of Tristan da Cunha, naming them after himself.
- In Ming dynasty China, the costs of the courier system are met by a tax in silver on land, instead of corvée labor service.
- Duarte Barbosa returns to Lisbon.
- Johannes Trithemius becomes abbot of the monastery of St. Jacob, at Würzburg.
- Leonardo da Vinci completes most of his work on the Mona Lisa.

== Births ==
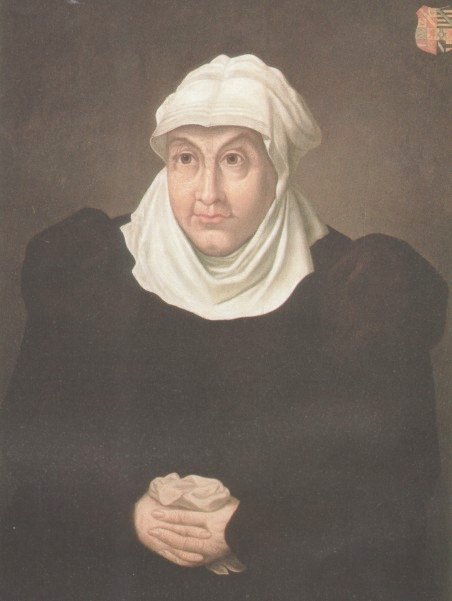
Juliana of Stolberg

- February – George Buchanan, Scottish humanist scholar (d. 1582)
- February 2 – René de Birague, French cardinal and chancellor (d. 1583)
- February 15 – Juliana of Stolberg, German countess (d. 1580)
- March 3 – Luís of Portugal, Duke of Beja (d. 1555)
- April 7 – Francis Xavier, Spanish Jesuit saint (d. 1552)
- April 13 – Peter Faber, French Jesuit theologian (d. 1546)
- July 1 – Louis II of Hungary and Bohemia (d. 1526)
- August 12 – Franciscus Sonnius, Dutch counter-Reformation theologian (d. 1576)
- October – Louis de Blois, Flemish mystical writer (d. 1566)
- December 4 – Thomas Darcy, 1st Baron Darcy of Chiche, English courtier (d. 1558)
- December 8 – Veit Dietrich, German theologian, writer and reformer (d. 1549)
- date unknown
  - Vicente Masip, Spanish painter (d. 1579)
  - William Paget, 1st Baron Paget, English statesman (d. 1563)
  - Ii Naomori, Japanese samurai (d. 1560)
- probable
  - Elizabeth Barton, English nun (d. 1534)
  - Margaret Lee, confidante of Queen Anne Boleyn (d. 1543)

== Deaths ==
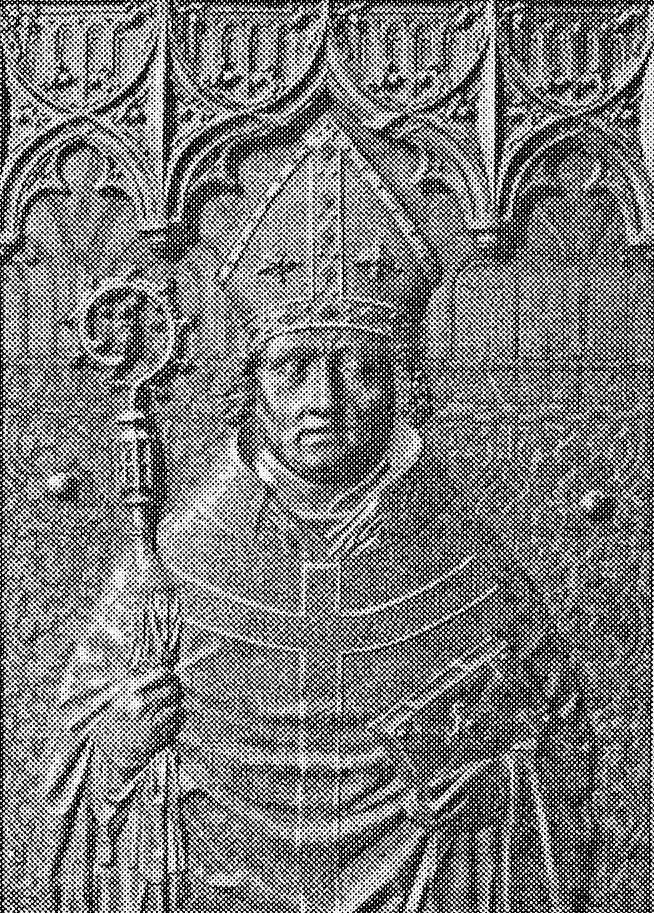
Johann IV Roth

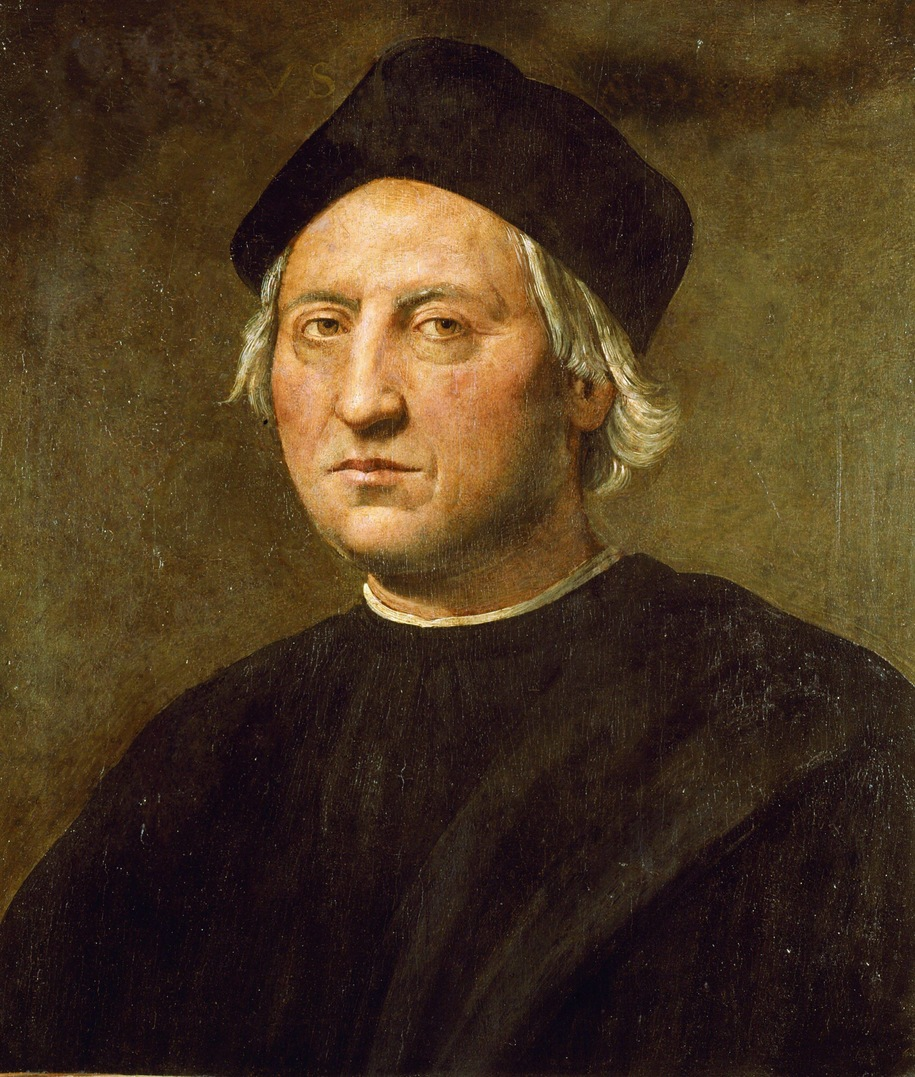
Christopher Columbus

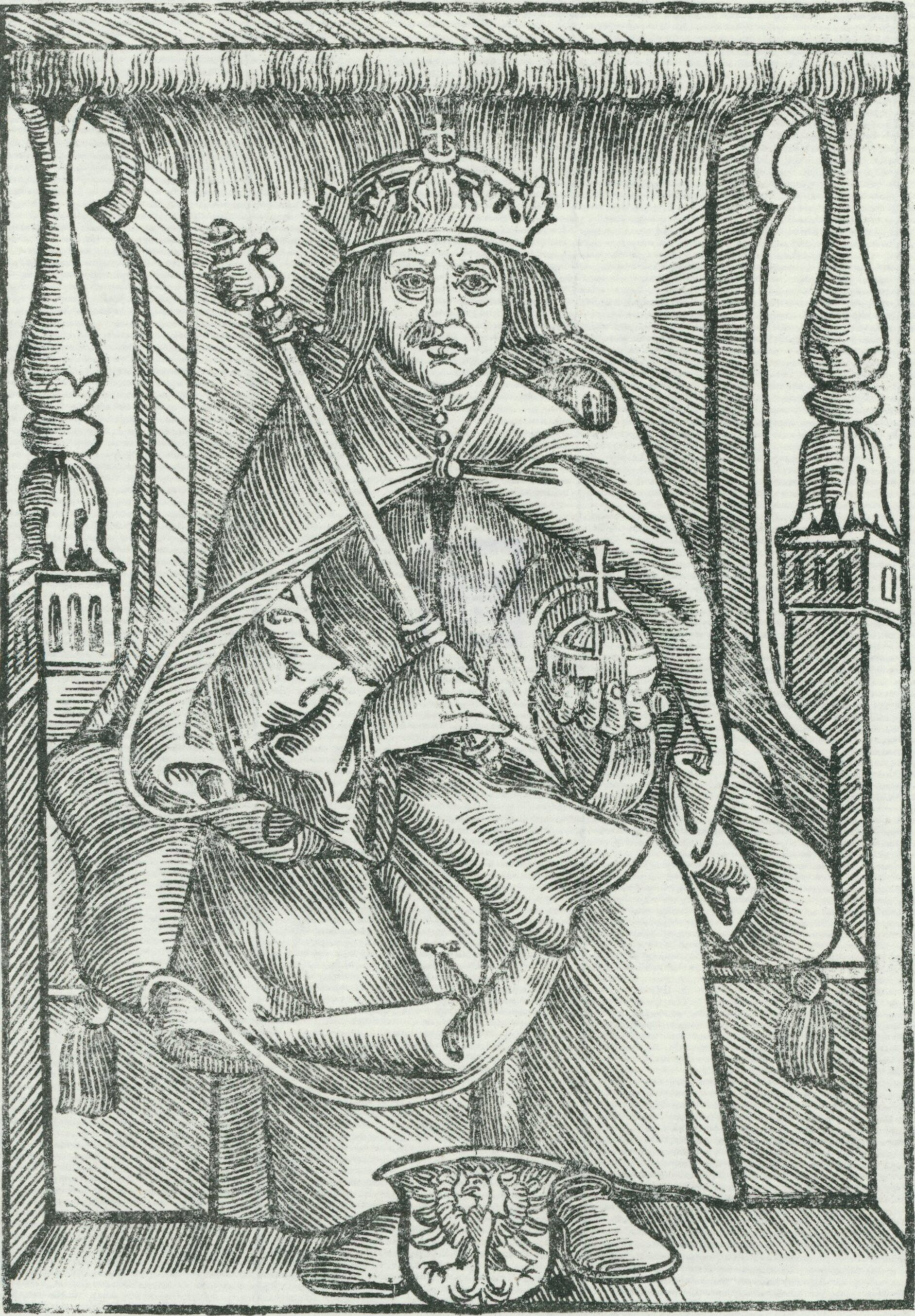
King Alexander Jagiellon of Poland

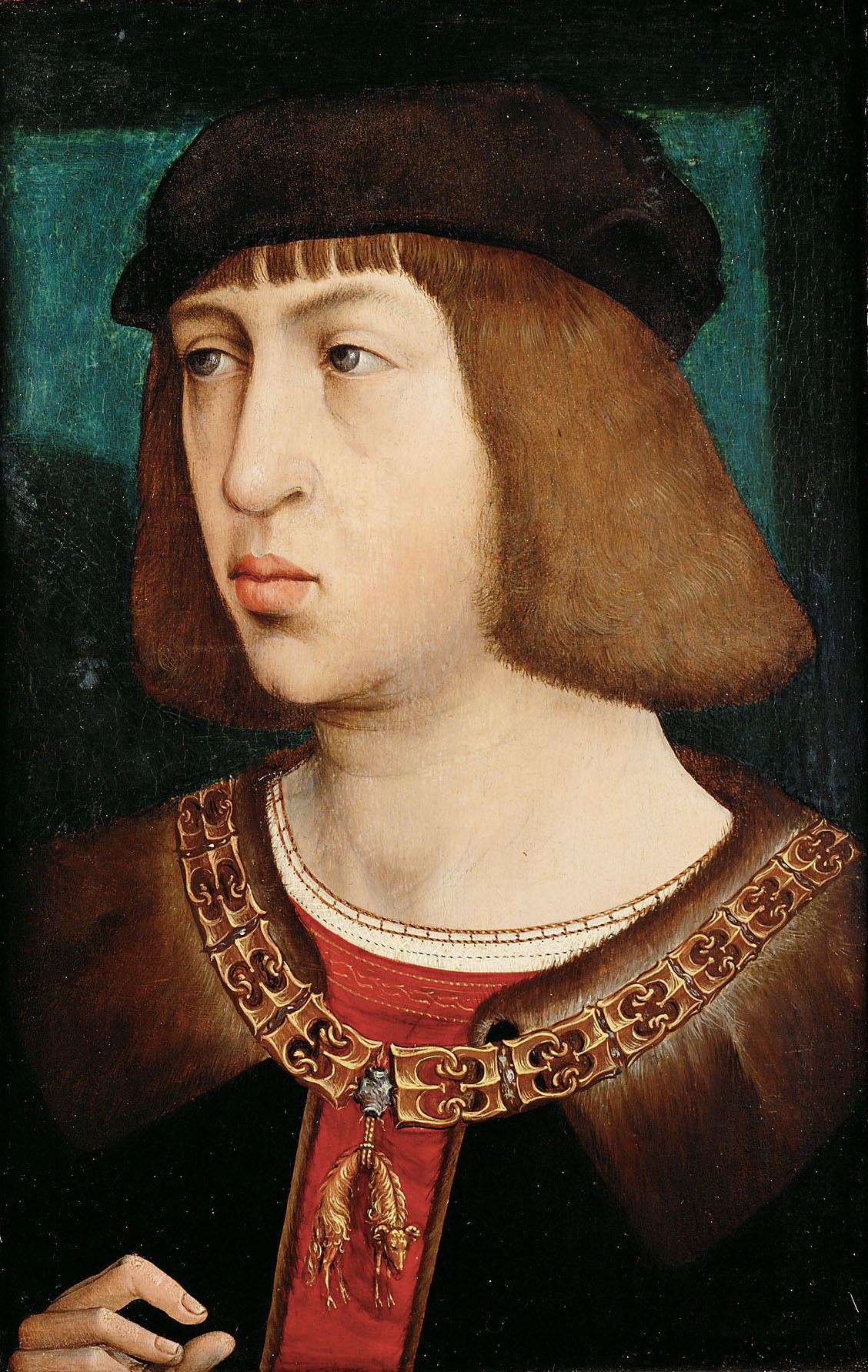
King Philip the Handsome of Castile

- January 21 – Johann IV Roth, German Roman Catholic bishop (b. 1426)
- May 4 – Sultan Husayn Mirza Bayqara, Timurid ruler of Herat (b. 1438)
- May 20 – Christopher Columbus, Italian explorer (b. c.1451)
- August 15 – Alexander Agricola, Flemish composer (b. c. 1445)
- August 19 – King Alexander Jagiellon of Poland (b. 1461)
- September 13 – Andrea Mantegna, Italian painter and engraver (b. 1432)
- September 25 – King Philip the Handsome of Castile (b. 1478)
- September 30 – Beatrice, Duchess of Viseu, Portuguese infante (b. 1430)
- November 8 – Edward Hastings, 2nd Baron Hastings, English noble (b. 1466)
- November 20 – Yeonsangun of Joseon, king of Korean Joseon Dynasty (b. 1476)
- November 21 – Engelbert, Count of Nevers, younger son of John I (b. 1462)
- date unknown – Mihri Hatun, Ottoman poet
