= Mudzaffar Shah =

Mudzaffar Shah may refer to:

- Mudzaffar Shah I of Kedah
- Mudzaffar Shah II of Kedah
- Mudzaffar Shah III of Kedah

== See also ==
- Muzaffar Shah (disambiguation)
