= Mahmud Shah =

Mahmud Shah may refer to:

- Mahmud Shah I of Kedah
- Mahmud Shah II of Kedah
- Mahmud Shah of Malacca (died 1528), sultan of Malacca 1488–1528
- Mahmud Shah of Jaunpur, sultan of the Jaunpur Sultanate
- Mahmud of Pahang (1868-1917)
- Mahmud of Terengganu (1930-1998)
- Mahmud Shah of Bengal (1435–1459)
- Mir Mahmud Hotaki, Mahmud Shah Hotak, ruler of Persia/Afghanistan from 1717 to 1725
- Mahmud Shah Durrani, Ruler of Afghanistan between 1801–1803 and 1809–1818
- Muhamud Muzaffar Shah (1823–1864), Sultan of Riau Sultanate
- Mahmood Shah, Pakistani football referee

Rulers of Gujarat Sultanate

- Mahmud Shah I (1458-1511), popularly known as Mahmud Begada
- Mahmud Shah II (reigned 1489–1490)
- Mahmud Shah III of Gujarat (1526-1554)

== See also ==
- Nasiruddin Mahmud Shah (disambiguation)
