= Flag and coat of arms of Kedah =

Symbols of the Malaysian state

The flag and coat of arms of Kedah are the state symbols of Kedah, Malaysia. Few distinctions are present between the flag and coat of arms of the state, as the flag consists of only a red field with the state arms on the upper hoist.

== Flag ==
Kedah
- Use: Civil and state flag
- Proportion: 1:2
- Adopted: 1912
- Design: A red field with the state's coat of arms on its upper hoist.

=== Design ===
The Kedahan flag is essentially a red flag with only the state arms of Kedah charged on its upper hoist, the upper left quarter of the flag. The red, Kedah's traditional colour, signifies prosperity, while the flag's arms is as interpreted with the standalone arms.

=== History ===
During the beginning of the 18th century, Kedah's flag only consists of a plain red field. In 1821, the flag was changed to be charged with a yellow tiger. This flag came to be known as the "harimau terkam" (pouncing tiger) or "harimau melompat" (jumping tiger) flag. The flag was used during Sultan Ahmad Tajuddin Halim Shah II's reign, and was raised on top of the Kota Kedah before the Siam capture of the fort and occupation of the sultanate during which they took down the flag. The flag went on being used by the Sultan's troops while recapturing the land and remained as the state flag until 1912 when it was changed to instead be charged with the state arms on the upper hoist.

The flag of Kedah used from the 18th century to 1821. Flag ratio: 1:2

The flag of Kedah used from 1821 to 1912. Flag ratio: 1:2

=== Variants ===
==== Standards ====
Kedah's royalty flies a series of royal standards that consist of plain coloured flags with the state arms charged at the centre or flags with a canton of a different colour containing the state arms. In addition, similarly designed Standards are also flown by high-ranking governments officials affiliated with the Sultan of Kedah. Like the state flag, all Standards utilise any two of or all three colours: Red, green and yellow; the colours of the arms also vary between Standards.

The standards include:

- Standard of the sultan: A yellow flag with the state arms charged at the centre. The wreath and shield of the arms are green, while the crescent is red.
- Standard of the sultanah: A yellow flag with a red canton containing the state arms. Similar to the original arms, the wreath and shield of the Standard's arms are yellow, while the crescent is green.
- Standard of the crown prince: A red flag with a yellow canton containing an entirely green state arms.
- Standard of the bendahara (prime minister): A red flag with a green canton containing an entirely yellow state arms.
- Standard of the president of the State Council and Sultan Advisor: A green flag with the state arms charged at the centre. The arms is entirely yellow.
Flags of Kedah

==== Maritime flags ====
As a formerly independent state, Kedah was known to fly ensigns on its ships. Among them were the state ensign and merchant ensign, the former similar in design as a variant of the Kedahan Standards, while the latter adopted a different design.

The state ensign took the appearance of a Standard-like design that simply incorporates a canton containing the state arms. The flag is blue, but unlike Standards of the design, its canton is essentially design as per the state flag, coloured red and containing the state arms in its original colours.

The merchant ensign is of a completely different design, but incorporates all three of the state's flag colours in the form of three diagonally cut sections: A large, red, diagonal per bend stripe divides the upper fly—coloured yellow—and the lower hoist—coloured green.

State ensign

Merchant ensign

== Coat of arms ==
Coat of arms of Kedah
- Armiger: Kedah
- Supporters: A crescent Vert and Two wreaths of rice Or

The Kedahan coat of arms consists of only three heraldic elements: An escutcheon, a crescent, and a wreath; the arms may be illustrated with only the aforementioned elements or included against a red ellipse. Details of the arm's heraldic elements are as follows:

Escutcheon
The escutcheon, which consists of a yellow Swiss shield, represents the sovereign's authority and symbolises the role of the ruler as the protector and guardian of his subjects and all the inhabitants of Kedah from unjust governance; the shield also signifies strength and authority.
Occasionally, a defacement with Jawi scriptures that reads "نݢري قدح" (State of Kedah) rest on the horizontal meridian on the shield. There has been known variations of defacements on the shield. The Jawi script may be written in black, red, or yellow (against a white band), and bands may be included behind the scripture. A variant of the shield may also include no Jawi scripts at all.

Crescent
The green crescent, which is located underneath the shield and faces upwards towards the shield, signifies Islam as the state's official religion.

Wreath or garland
The wreath or garland is depicted as two stalks of rice tied together and enveloping the shield and crescent. It represents rice as the state's principal product.

Like the state flag, the Kedahan arms is featured on Standards and the state ensign. However, the colours used on the arms may vary but utilise red, green or yellow, with the wreath and shield given one colour while the crescent is given another or the same.

=== City, district and municipal council emblems ===
All 12 local governments in Kedah have their own emblem, which bears the state Coat of Arms at the top and evolved in design throughout history. Each design may reflect a municipality's identities and or the roles and responsibilities of its local authority.

Emblem of Alor Setar City Council

Municipality	Local government	Notable element(s)	Motto(s)
Alor Setar	Alor Setar City Council	Balai Besar; Crepe Myrtle; Mango Plum Tree Leaf; Wisma Darul Aman; Zahir Mosque; Two rampant tigers	Majlis Bandaraya Alor Setar (Alor Setar City Council)
Baling	Baling District Council	Buildings; Gunung Baling	Bersih Maju Sejahtera (Clean, Progressive and Prosperous); Majlis Daerah Baling (Baling District Council); Kedah Darul Aman
Bandar Baharu	Bandar Baharu District Council	Arowana; Factory; Gear or cogwheel; Paddy	Majlis Daerah Bandar Baharu (Bandar Baharu District Council); Kedah Darul Aman
Kubang Pasu	Kubang Pasu Municipal Council	Book; Buildings; Gear or cogwheel	Bandar Ilmu (City of Knowledge); Majlis Perbandaran Kubang Pasu (Kubang Pasu Municipal Council); Kedah Darul Aman
Kulim	Kulim Municipal Council	Buildings; Gear or cogwheel; Hills; Trees	Dedikasi Ke Arah Kecemerlangan (Dedication Towards Excellence); Majlis Perbandaran Kulim (Kulim Municipal Council); Kedah Darul Aman
Kulim Hi-Tech Park	Kulim Hi-Tech Industrial Park Local Authority	An atom	Pihak Berkuasa Tempatan (Local Authority); Kehidupan Selesa, Persekitaran Indah (Comfortable Life, Beautiful Environment)
Langkawi	Langkawi Municipal Council	Beach; Brahminy Kite; Gear or cogwheel; House; Sailboat	Majlis Perbandaran Langkawi Bandaraya Pelancongan (Tourism City of Langkawi Municipal Council); Kedah Darul Aman
Padang Terap	Padang Terap District Council	Gear or cogwheel; Pedu Lake; Seraya Waterfall; Trees	Majlis Daerah Padang Terap (Padang Terap District Council); Kedah Darul Aman
Pendang	Pendang District Council	Gear or cogwheel; House; Tree; Paddy	Majlis Daerah Pendang (Pendang District Council); Kedah Darul Aman
Sik	Sik District Council	Gear or cogwheel; Factory; Hill; Leaves; Waterfall	Majlis Daerah Sik (Sik District Council); Kedah Darul Aman
Sungai Petani	Sungai Petani Municipal Council	Gear or cogwheel; Sungai Petani Clock Tower; Trees; Buildings	Majlis Perbandaran Sungai Petani (Sungai Petani Municipal Council); Kedah Darul Aman
Yan	Yan District Council	Gear or cogwheel; House; Mount Jerai; Islands	Majlis Daerah Yan (Yan District Council); Kedah Darul Aman
