= Muzaffar Shah =

Muzaffar Shah may refer to:

== Rulers of Gujarat Sultanate and from Muzaffarid dynasty ==
- Muzaffar Shah I (died 1411), reigned 1391–1403 and 1404–1411
- Muzaffar Shah II (died 1526), reigned 1511–1526
- Muzaffar Shah III (died 1592), reigned 1561–1573 and 1584

== Others ==
- Muzaffar Shah of Malacca (died 1459), reigned 1446–1459
- Muzaffar Shah of Pahang (died 1540), reigned 1530–1540
- Muzaffar Shah I of Perak (1505–1549), reigned 1528–1549
- Muzaffar Shah II of Perak (died 1653), reigned 1636–1653

== See also ==
- Mudzaffar Shah (disambiguation)
