= Nasiruddin Mahmud =

Nasiruddin Mahmud may refer to:

- Nasir ad-Din Mahmud I (r. 1092–1094), Sultan of the Seljuk Empire
- Nasir al-Din Mahmud (r. 1201–1222), Bey of the Artuqids
- Nasir ad-Din Mahmud (r. 1219–1234), Zengid emir of Mosul
- Nasiruddin Mahmud (eldest son of Iltutmish) (r. 1227–1229), a governor of Bengal under the Delhi Sultanate
- Nasiruddin Mahmud Shah (disambiguation)
  - Nasiruddin Mahmud Shah, Sultan of Delhi (r. 1246–1265)
  - Nasir-ud-Din Mahmud Shah Tughluq (r. 1394–1413), Sultan of Delhi
  - Mahmud Shah (Sultan of Bengal) (r. 1435–1459)

== See also ==
- An-Nasir Muhammad bin Abdallah (1196–1226), Zaidi imam of Yemen
- Nasir al-Din Muhammad (r. 1261–1318), Mihrabanid malik of Sistan
- Nasir-ad-Din Muhammad (r. 1293–194), Sultan of Egypt and Syria
- Al-Nasir Muhammad Salah al-Din (r. 1372–1391), Zaidi imam of Yemen
- Nasir ud din Muhammad Shah III (r. 1390–1394), Tughlaq sultan of Delhi
- An-Nasir ad-Din Muhammad (r. 1421–1422), Mamluk sultan of Egypt
- An-Nasir Muhammad bin Yusuf (r. 1474–1488), Zaidi imam of Yemen
- An-Nasir Muhammad ibn Qaitbay (r. 1496–1498), Mamluk sultan of Egypt
- An-Nasir Muhammad (Zaidi imam) (1680–1754)
