= Merong Mahawangsa =

Legendary king of Langkasuka

- Founder of Langkasuka

First Langkasuka King
- Reign: c. 2 century
- Predecessor: Kingdom Founded
- Successor: Merong Mahapudisat
- Born: Parthia or Rum
- Issue: Merong Mahapudisat; Ganjil Sarjuna; Seri Mahawangsa; Raja Puteri
- House: Mahawangsa (founder)
- Dynasty: Langkasuka

Merong Mahawangsa is a legendary warrior and a ruler who is said to be the first king of Langkasuka, or the modern-day Pattani. His tale is mentioned in the Kedah Annals, where it mentions him as a hero who became the first king of Langkasuka.

== The legend of Merong Mahawangsa ==
The Kedah Annals claimed that Merong was a descendant of Alexander the Great (known in Malay legend as Iskandar Zulkarnain).

According to the Kedah Annals, Merong was a fighter and ruler from an unknown kingdom. He sailed and ventured around from kingdom to kingdom but spent mostly on his life stayed in Rome. One day, he left Rome to do some trading in China. But then, after he passed the Arabian Sea, he was suddenly attacked by a legendary giant phoenix called Garuda, which destroyed most of Merong's fleet. They fled to the nearest land, which is Bujang Valley, where they settled and founded the kingdom of Langkasuka.

Merong had three sons, Merong Mahapudisat, Ganjil Sarjuna, and Seri Mahawangsa, and a daughter, Raja Puteri, who is the second youngest in the family.

Merong was the original ruler of Langkasuka before he made his son, Merong Mahapudisat, the king. He returned to Rome, leaving his son to rule after. His fate was unknown, as some say that he died on his way to Rome. His son ruled Langkasuka, along with his descendants, until Phra Ong Mahawangsa converted to Islam and changed the Kingdom of Langkasuka into the Sultanate of Kedah. He also changed his name to Sultan Mudzafar Shah.

Later, the salutation for the king of Langkasuka changed to the Sultanate of Kedah. The name 'Langkasuka' can be divided into two parts: for which 'Langka' meant 'the land of glory' in Sanskrit, while 'suka' means 'joy' or 'happiness'.

== Merong Mahawangsa in popular culture ==
- A Royal Malaysian Navy Vessel named KD Mahawangsa is named in his honour.
- "The Malay Chronicles: Bloodlines" was a 2011 Malaysian epic film that tells the life and adventures of the warrior, who is portrayed by British actor Stephen Rahman-Hughes.

== See also ==
- Hikayat Merong Mahawangsa
- Hikayat Hang Tuah
- Sejarah Melayu
- Sultanate of Kedah
