= Ahmad Tajuddin Halim Shah I of Kedah =

Sultan of Kedah (r. 1706–1710)

Ahmad Tajuddin Halim Shah I أحمد تاج الدين حليم شاه ١
- Sultan and Yang di-Pertuan of the State of Kedah Dar ul-Aman
- Reign: 1706–1710
- Predecessor: Abdullah Mu'adzam Shah
- Successor: Muhammad Jiwa Zainal Adilin Mu'adzam Shah II
- Died: 15 February 1710; Istana Baginda, Kota Bukit Pinang
- Burial: Langgar Royal Mausoleum
Posthumous name
- Al-Marhum Bukit Pinang al-Thani
- House: Kedah
- Father: Abdullah Mu'adzam Shah
- Mother: Wan Nang Mas
- Religion: Sunni Islam

Paduka Sri Sultan Ahmad Tajuddin Halim Shah I ibni al-Marhum Sultan Abdullah Mu'adzam Shah (Jawi: ڤدوك سري سلطان أحمد تاج الدين حليم شاه ١ ابن المرحوم سلطان عبد الله معظم شاه; died 15 February 1710) was the 18th Sultan of Kedah and reigned from 1706 to 1710. He was appointed as heir apparent with the title of Raja Muda, after his elder brother, Tunku Muhammad Jiwa left for Sumatra.

Ahmad Tajuddin Halim Shah I of Kedah House of Kedah Died: 15 February 1710
Regnal titles
Preceded by Abdullah Mu'adzam Shah	Sultan of Kedah; 1706–1710	Succeeded by Muhammad Jiwa Zainal Adilin Mu'adzam Shah II
