= Nasiruddin Mahmud Shah =

Nasiruddin Mahmud Shah may refer to:

- Nasiruddin Mahmud (eldest son of Iltutmish), governor of Bengal (r. 1227–1229)
- Nasiruddin Mahmud Shah, Sultan of Delhi (r. 1246–1265)
- Mahmud Shah of Bengal (r. 1435–1459), Sultan of Bengal

== See also ==
- Nasiruddin Mahmud (disambiguation)
- Naseeruddin Shah (born 1950), Indian actor
