= Abdullah Mu'adzam Shah of Kedah =

Sultan of Kedah (r. 1698–1706)

Abdullah Mu'adzam Shah عبد الله معظم شاه
- Sultan and Yang di-Pertuan of the State of Kedah Dar ul-Aman
- Reign: 1698–1706
- Predecessor: Ataullah Muhammad Shah II
- Successor: Ahmad Tajuddin Halim Shah I
- Died: 22 September 1706; Istana Baginda, Kota Bukit Pinang
- Burial: Langgar Royal Mausoleum
- Spouse: Wan Nang Mas the second wife
- Issue: Sultan Muhammad Jiwa Zainal Adilin II; Sultan Ahmad Tajuddin Halim Shah I Tunku Aisha
Posthumous name
- Al-Marhum Bukit Pinang al-Thani
- House: Kedah
- Father: Ataullah Muhammad Shah II
- Mother: Tunku Maheran
- Religion: Sunni Islam

Paduka Sri Sultan Abdullah Mu'adzam Shah ibni al-Marhum Sultan Ataullah Muhammad Shah II (Jawi: ڤدوك سري سلطان عبد الله معظم شاه ابن المرحوم سلطان عطاء الله محمد شاه ٢; died 22 September 1706) was the 17th Sultan of Kedah and reigned from 1698 to 1706.

Abdullah Mu'adzam Shah of Kedah House of Kedah Died: 22 September 1706
Regnal titles
| Preceded by Ataullah Muhammad Shah II | Sultan of Kedah; 1698–1706 | Succeeded by Ahmad Tajuddin Halim Shah I |
