= Ataullah Muhammad Shah I of Kedah =

Sultan of Kedah (r. 1423–1473)

Ataullah Muhammad Shah I عطاء الله محمد شاه ١
- Sultan of Kedah
- Reign: 1423–1473
- Predecessor: Sulaiman Shah I
- Successor: Muhammad Jiwa Zainal Adilin Mu'adzam Shah I
- Died: 22 January 1473; Kota Seputih, Kedah
- Burial: Kota Seputih Royal Cemetery
- Spouse: Che' Puan Paduka Bonda; Tengku Permaisuri
- Issue: Sultan Muhammad Jiwa Zainal Adilin Mu'adzam Shah I Tunku 'Usman; Tunku Putri; Tunku Pok
- House: Kedah
- Father: Sulaiman Shah I
- Religion: Sunni Islam

Paduka Sri Sultan Ataullah Muhammad Shah I ibni al-Marhum Sultan Sulaiman Shah I (Jawi: ڤدوك سري سلطان عطاء الله محمد شاه ١ ابن المرحوم سلطان سليمان شاه ١; died 22 January 1473) was the eighth Sultan of Kedah and reigned from 1423 to 1473.

Ataullah Muhammad Shah I of Kedah House of Kedah Died: 22 January 1473
Regnal titles
Preceded by Sulaiman Shah I	Sultan of Kedah; 1423–1473	Succeeded by Muhammad Jiwa Zainal Adilin Mu'adzam Shah I
