= Muhyiddin Mansur Shah of Kedah =

Sultan of Kedah (r. 1652–1662)

Muhyiddin Mansur Shah محي الدين منصور شاه
- Sultan of Kedah Dar ul-Aman
- Reign: 1652–1662
- Predecessor: Rijaluddin Muhammad Shah
- Successor: Dziaddin Mukarram Shah I
- Died: 4 January 1662; Istana Baginda, Kota Sena
- Burial: Kota Sena Royal Cemetery
- Spouse: Wan Sara
- Issue: Sultan Dziaddin Mukarram Shah I Tunku Zamzam
Posthumous name
- Al-Marhum Sena
- House: Kedah
- Father: Rijaluddin Muhammad Shah
- Mother: Wan Fatima
- Religion: Sunni Islam

Paduka Sri Sultan Muhyiddin Mansur Shah ibni al-Marhum Sultan Rijaluddin Muhammad Shah (Jawi: ڤدوك سري سلطان محي الدين منصور شاه ابن المرحوم سلطان رجال الدين محمد شاه; died 4 January 1662) was the 14th Sultan of Kedah and reigned from 1652 to 1662. He established his capital at Kota Sena in 1654. He accepted Siamese suzerainty and dispatched the first "bunga mas" in September 1660.

Muhyiddin Mansur Shah of Kedah House of Kedah Died: 4 January 1662
Regnal titles
Preceded by Rijaluddin Muhammad Shah	Sultan of Kedah; 1652–1662	Succeeded by Dziaddin Mukarram Shah I
