= Rijaluddin Muhammad Shah of Kedah =

Sultan of Kedah (r. 1626–1652)

Rijaluddin Muhammad Shah رجال الدين محمد شاه
- Sultan of Kedah Dar ul-Aman (Arabic: سلطان قدح دار الأمان)
- Reign: 1626–1652
- Predecessor: Sulaiman Shah II
- Successor: Muhyiddin Mansur Shah
- Died: 4 October 1652; Istana Baginda, Kota Naga
- Spouse: Wan Fatima
- Issue: Sultan Muhyiddin Mansur Shah; Tunku Pangeran; Tunku Rahima
Posthumous name
- Al-Marhum Kota Naga
- House: Kedah
- Father: Sulaiman Shah II
- Mother: Che' Ratnamala
- Religion: Sunni Islam

Paduka Sri Sultan Rijaluddin Muhammad Shah ibni al-Marhum Sultan Sulaiman Shah II (Jawi: ڤدوك سري سلطان رجال الدين محمد شاه ابن المرحوم سلطان سليمان شاه ٢; died 4 October 1652) was the 13th Sultan of Kedah and reigned from 1626 to 1652. He assumed the regency in 1619 when his father was carried off to Aceh as a prisoner. He appealed for help from the King of Siam, in an attempt to counter Acehnese hegemony. He moved his capital to Kota Naga in August 1626. He entered into diplomatic relations with the Dutch in Batavia. The Hukum Kanun Kedah and Undang-Undang Pelabuhan Kedah which was a law very similar to Undang-Undang Melaka was written during his reign.

Rijaluddin Muhammad Shah of Kedah House of Kedah Died: 4 October 1652
Regnal titles
| Preceded by Sulaiman Shah II | Sultan of Kedah; 1626–1652 | Succeeded by Muhyiddin Mansur Shah |
