= Sulaiman Shah II of Kedah =

Sultan of Kedah (r. 1602–1626)

Sulaiman Shah II سليمان شاه ٢
- Sultan of Kedah Dar ul-Aman
- Reign: 1602–1626
- Predecessor: Mudzaffar Shah III
- Successor: Rijaluddin Muhammad Shah
- Died: 28 February 1626; Aceh
- Spouse: Che' Ratnamala the second wife
- Issue: Sultan Rijaluddin Muhammad Shah; Tunku Safia; Tunku Zulikha; Tunku Mariyam
- House: Kedah
- Father: Mudzaffar Shah III
- Mother: Che' Tempawan
- Religion: Sunni Islam

Paduka Sri Sultan Sulaiman Shah II ibni al-Marhum Sultan Mudzaffar Shah III (Jawi: ڤدوك سري سلطان سليمان شاه ٢ ابن المرحوم سلطان مظفر شاه ٣; died 28 February 1626) was the 12th Sultan of Kedah and reigned from 1602 to 1626. During his reign raids from the Aceh Sultanate destroyed many black pepper plantation in Langkawi, as Aceh wanted to monopolize the industry. He built the Kota Kuala Bahang as a defensive fortress in response to the Acehnese raid with assistance from the Portuguese Empire. A huge raid from Aceh in 1619 destroyed the fortress and forced the Portuguese to evacuate.

Sulaiman Shah II of Kedah House of Kedah Died: 28 February 1626
Regnal titles
| Preceded by Mudzaffar Shah III | Sultan of Kedah; 1602–1626 | Succeeded by Rijaluddin Muhammad Shah |
