= Mu'adzam Shah of Kedah =

Sultan of Kedah (r. 1179–1202)

Mu'adzam Shah معظم شاه
- Sultan of Kedah
- Reign: 27 July 1179 – 10 May 1202
- Predecessor: Mudzaffar Shah I
- Successor: Muhammad Shah
- Born: 31 January 1158; Hulu Kedah, Kedah
- Died: 10 May 1202 (aged 44); Kota Bukit Mariam
- Issue: Sultan Muhammad Shah; Tunku Maheran; Tunku Putri
- House: Kedah
- Father: Mudzaffar Shah I
- Religion: Sunni Islam

Paduka Sri Sultan Mu'adzam Shah ibni al-Marhum Sultan Mudzaffar Shah I (Jawi: ڤدوك سري سلطان معظم شاه ابن المرحوم سلطان مظفر شاه ١; died 10 May 1202; also spelt Sultan Mu'azzam Shah) was the second Sultan of Kedah. He reigned from 1179 to 1202.

Mu'adzam Shah of Kedah House of Kedah Died: 10 May 1202
Regnal titles
Preceded by Mudzaffar Shah I	Sultan of Kedah; 1179–1202	Succeeded by Muhammad Shah
