= Muhammad Shah of Kedah =

Sultan of Kedah (r. 1202–1236)

Muhammad Shah محمد شاه
- Sultan of Kedah
- Reign: 10 May 1202 – 23 October 1237
- Predecessor: Mu'adzam Shah
- Successor: Muzzil Shah
- Died: 23 October 1237; Istana, Kota Bukit Mariam
- Burial: Kota Bukit Mariam Royal Cemetery
- Issue: Sultan Muzzil Shah; Tunku Nur Aisha
- House: Kedah
- Father: Mu'adzam Shah
- Religion: Sunni Islam

Paduka Sri Sultan Muhammad Shah ibni al-Marhum Sultan Mu'adzam Shah (Jawi: ڤدوك سري سلطان محمد شاه ابن المرحوم سلطان معظم شاه; died 23 October 1237) was the third sultan of Kedah. He reigned from 1202 to 1237. The first gold coin used in Kedah had the words "Muhammed Shah" and "Al-Sultan Al-Kedah" on either side.

Muhammad Shah of Kedah House of Kedah Died: 23 October 1237
Regnal titles
Preceded by Mu'adzam Shah	Sultan of Kedah; 1202–1237	Succeeded by Muzzil Shah
