= Muhammad Jiwa Zainal Adilin II of Kedah =

Sultan of Kedah (r. 1710–1778)

Muhammad Jiwa Zainal Adilin Mu'adzam Shah II محمد جيوا زين العابدين معظم شاه ٢
- al-Azizzu ul-Mulk al-Qadir al-Ghalib Ghahr al-Maghlub, us-Sultan Khalifatu’llah ‘Ala Da’irah Kedah; Sultan and Yang di-Pertuan of the State of Kedah Dar ul-Aman
- Reign: 1710 – 23 September 1778
- Predecessor: Ahmad Tajuddin Halim Shah I
- Successor: Abdullah Mukarram Shah
- Born: 1699; Kedah Darul Aman
- Died: 23 September 1778 (aged 78–79); Istana Baginda, Alor Star
- Burial: Langgar Royal Mausoleum
- Spouse: Nang Che’ Puan Paduka Bonda; Tunku Putri the third wife the fourth wife
- Issue: Tunku Long Putra Shah; Tunku Mangku Putra; Sultan Abdullah Mukarram Shah; Sultan Dziaddin Mukarram Shah II; Tunku Rahima; Tunku Dayang
Posthumous name
- Al-Marhum Kota Star al-Awwal
- House: Kedah
- Father: Abdullah Mu'adzam Shah
- Mother: Wan Nang Mas
- Religion: Sunni Islam

Paduka Sri Sultan Muhammad Jiwa Zainal Adilin Mu'adzam Shah II ibni al-Marhum Sultan Ahmad Tajuddin Halim Shah I (Jawi: ڤدوك سري سلطان محمد جيوا زين العابدين معظم شاه ٢ ابن المرحوم سلطان أحمد تاج الدين حليم شاه ١; 1699 – 23 September 1778; also spelt Sultan Muhammad Jiwa Zain al-‘Adilan Mu’azzam Shah) was the 19th Sultan of Kedah and reigned from 1710 to 1778.

He is seen as one of the more able rulers of Kedah by historians today as he brought up a functioning government after years of disunity within the kingdom. He set up a governmental administration and is widely known as the founder of Alor Setar with many current landmarks in the city being attributed to him. He managed to recruit powerful allies like the Bugis against the Minangkabau, but not without issues, and stopped working with the English when he knew the outcome was not beneficial. He was succeeded by his son, Abdullah Mukarram Shah, known for ceding Penang to Francis Light after a brief conflict. His son in-law was the first Sultan of Selangor, Salehuddin.

== Early life ==
He went on pilgrimage to Jambi and Palembang, where he met the Arab religious teacher Shaikh Abdul Jalil, then journeyed with him to Java and India. He returned to the mainland from his exile in Langkawi and formally was installed at the Istana Bukit Pinang in May 1710. Istana Bukit Pinang being upriver of the current town of Alor Setar.

== Reign (1710–1778) ==
In 1723, Sultan Muhammad Jiwa invited the Bugis of Riau, Daeng Parani, to help him defeat a rebel force led by his younger brother who wanted to seize the throne. Daeng Parani and his army then went to Kedah and attacked the rebel force which was defeated and brought Sultan Muhammad Jiwa back to the throne. He planned to give Daeng Parani 15 bahara in return for his help but only paid 3 bahara with the rest to be paid later.

In early 1724, Raja Kecil and his army from Siak came to Kedah to help his against Sultan Muhammad Jiwa's younger brother's rebellion. He then sent a messenger back to Riau to ask for help from the Bugis to defeat the rebels. The Bugis army from Riau led by Daeng Parani and assisted by Daeng Marewah and Daeng Merampuk was sent to Kedah with 62 perahu. Upon arriving, Daeng Parani asked Raja Kecil to reconcile the relationship between the Sultan of Kedah and his younger brother, but Raja Kecil ignored him. A war then broke out between Daeng Parani's forces and Raja Kecil. The war continued for two years until Daeng Parani was killed, and Daeng Marewah then led the Bugis army until he defeated Raja Kecil's army. Raja Kecil and the remaining forces of his army retreated to Siak.

The recent Bugis involvement in high level politics became a big issue for him and he is known to have said:

"Riau, Johor, Selangor and Kelang [were] formerly governed by Malay kings and are inhabited by Malays … the Bugis came and settled at Riau and from thence to Selangor and from Selangor to Kelang. From what pretensions the Bugis derive their authority in these areas we know not"

A marriage alliance was made between his son and the daughter of Sultan Salehuddin of Selangor as the latter had a political rivalry with the Bugis in Riau, and Salehuddin wanted a strong ally, the wedding took place in April 1767, but their relationship broke down in the following years.

An English post in Kedah was initially agreed on in 1771 between him and the East India Company along Kuala Kedah, but this was withdrawn in 1772 when Sultan Muhammad Jiwa could see any assistance against the Bugis would be insufficient.

Kedah achieved its greatest extent during his reign, its borders stretched from Terang in the north to Krian in the south.

=== Governance and economy ===
Sultan Muhammad Jiwa moved his court from Kota Bukit Pinang to Alor Setar in 1735, and in 1738 erected a functioning town on the base of a hill and ordered the realignment of a river. He established customary Islamic law codes and organized a governmental administration. The earliest coins bearing his name found are from 1741. He persistently refused to make commercial contracts with the Dutch to ensure an open port free from monopoly. Kedah’s port under his rule traded pepper—supported by royal sponsorship of pepper-export ventures—and exported rice, while maintaining an established commercial link with India.

=== Founding of capital and building developments ===
After founding the city, Sultan Muhammad Jiwa went on to build his palace, the Istana Kota Setar. The original building was a wooden structure which had been demolished several times due to attacks by the Bugis (1770) and the Siamese (1821). The currently standing concrete building was completed during the reign of Sultan Ahmad Tajuddin Mukarram Shah in the mid-19th century, his grandson's grandson.

This palace is also renowned as the Istana Pelamin Palace when the building was expanded to add a pavilion and several rooms when former Sultan Ahmad Tajuddin's son, Sultan Abdul Hamid Halim wanted to marry off his five children. After 1941, this palace was used as a school and an office for several organizations including the office for the Kedah chapter of St John Ambulance and the Scout movements. On 25 July 1983, this palace was declared the Kedah Royal Museum.

Another structure attributed to Sultan Muhammad Jiwa was the Balai Besar (Grand Audience Hall). Initially the function of the building was as the Balai Rong Seri or Balai Penghadapan (audience hall), that was situated at the back area of the Istana Kota Setar complex. The pillars, roofs and floors were made of wood and still stands to this day.

The Balai Nobat was also built by Sultan Muhammad Jiwa upon founding of Alor Setar. The 18-metre-tall (59 ft) and 5-metre-wide (16 ft) three-tiered octagonal tower's purpose was to keep all the royal musical instruments, including the serunai (wooden flute), nafiri, gendang (drum) and gong (also known as a nobat).

== Notes ==
Muhammad Jiwa Zainal Adilin II of Kedah House of Kedah Died: 23 September 1778
Regnal titles
Preceded by Ahmad Tajuddin Halim Shah I	Sultan of Kedah; 1710–1778	Succeeded by Abdullah Mukarram Shah
