= Mudzaffar Shah I of Kedah =

Sultan of Kedah (r. 1136–1179)

Mudzaffar Shah I مظفر شاه ١
- Sultan of Kedah
- Reign: 1136– 27 July 1179
- Successor: Mu'adzam Shah
- Died: 27 July 1179
- Issue: Sultan Mu'adzam Shah; Tunku Muhammad Shah; Tunku Sulaiman Shah
- House: Mahawangsa
- Father: Dharmawira of Srivijaya
- Religion: Sunni Islam formerly Hinduism

Paduka Sri Sultan Mudzaffar Shah I (Jawi: ڤدوك سري سلطان مظفر شاه ١; died 27 July 1179), styled Phra Ong Mahawangsa was a legendary king and was said to be the first sultan of Kedah, according to the Hikayat Merong Mahawangsa. He was the last Hindu king of Langkasuka, styled Sri Paduka Maharaja Durbar Raja before his accession. After his conversion to Islam, he later became the founder of the Kedah Sultanate.

== See also ==
- Merong Mahawangsa

Mudzaffar Shah I of Kedah House of Kedah Died: 1179
Regnal titles
Preceded by Position created	Sultan of Kedah; 1136–1179	Succeeded by Mu'adzam Shah
