= Ataullah Muhammad Shah II of Kedah =

Sultan of Kedah (r. 1688–1698)

Ataullah Muhammad Shah II عطاء الله محمد شاه ٢
- Sultan and Yang di-Pertuan of the State of Kedah Dar ul-Aman
- Reign: 1688–1698
- Predecessor: Dziaddin Mukarram Shah I
- Successor: Abdullah Mu'adzam Shah
- Died: 17 November 1698; Istana Baginda, Kota Bukit Pinang
- Burial: Kota Bukit Pinang Royal Cemetery
- Spouse: Tunku Maheran
- Issue: Sultan Abdullah Mu'adzam Shah; Tunku Ibrahim; Tunku Baharuddin; Tunku Latifa
Posthumous name
- Al-Marhum Bukit Pinang al-Awwal
- House: Kedah
- Father: Dziaddin Mukarram Shah I
- Mother: Che' Sepa Chandra
- Religion: Sunni Islam

Paduka Sri Sultan Ataullah Muhammad Shah II ibni al-Marhum Sultan Dziaddin Mukarram Shah I (Jawi: ڤدوك سري سلطان عطاء الله محمد شاه ٢ ابن المرحوم سلطان ضياء الدين مكرم شاه ١; died 17 November 1698) was the 16th Sultan of Kedah and reigned from 1688 to 1698. In 1692 he became regent for his elderly father. He moved his capital to Kota Bukit Pinang.

On 23 March 2017, his tomb was believed to have been found along with eight other tombs by the Malaysian Historical Society on the river banks at Kampung Bukit Pinang, near Alor Setar.

Ataullah Muhammad Shah II of Kedah House of Kedah Died: 17 November 1698
Regnal titles
Preceded by Dziaddin Mukarram Shah I	Sultan of Kedah; 1688–1698	Succeeded by Abdullah Mu'adzam Shah
