= Sulaiman Shah I of Kedah =

Sultan of Kedah (r. 1373–1423)

Sulaiman Shah I سليمان شاه ١
- Sultan of Kedah
- Reign: 1373–1423
- Predecessor: Ibrahim Shah
- Successor: Ataullah Muhammad Shah I
- Died: 2 August 1423; Istana Baginda, Kota Seputih
- Burial: Kota Seputih Royal Cemetery
- Issue: Sultan Ataullah Muhammad Shah I Tunku Mansur; Tunku Muhammad Jiwa
- House: Kedah
- Father: Ibrahim Shah
- Mother: Tunku Mala
- Religion: Sunni Islam

Paduka Sri Sultan Sulaiman Shah I ibni al-Marhum Sultan Ibrahim Shah (Jawi: ڤدوك سري سلطان سليمان شاه ١ ابن المرحوم سلطان إبراهيم شاه; died 2 August 1423) was the seventh sultan of Kedah and reigned from 1373 to 1423. During his reign Kedah was invaded by the Samudera Pasai Sultanate, which conquered a few cities in Kedah.

Sulaiman Shah I of Kedah House of Kedah Died: 2 August 1423
Regnal titles
Preceded by Ibrahim Shah	Sultan of Kedah; 1373–1423	Succeeded by Ataullah Muhammad Shah I
