= Ibrahim Shah of Kedah =

Sultan of Kedah (r. 1321–1373)

Ibrahim Shah إبراهيم شاه
- Sultan of Kedah
- Reign: 1321–1373
- Predecessor: Mahmud Shah I
- Successor: Sulaiman Shah I
- Died: 9 August 1373; Kota Seputih, Kedah
- Burial: Kota Seputih Royal Cemetery
- Spouse: Tunku Mala
- Issue: Sultan Muhammad Shah; Sultan Sulaiman Shah I Tunku 'Abdu'l Rahman
- House: Kedah
- Father: Mahmud Shah I
- Mother: Tunku Aisha
- Religion: Sunni Islam

Paduka Sri Sultan Ibrahim Shah ibni al-Marhum Sultan Mahmud Shah I (Jawi: ڤدوک سري سلطان إبراهيم شاه ابن المرحوم سلطان محمود شاه ١; died 9 August 1373) was the sixth Sultan of Kedah and reigned from 1321 to 1373. He established his capital at Kota Seputih in May 1323.

Ibrahim Shah of Kedah House of Kedah Died: 9 August 1373
Regnal titles
Preceded by Mahmud Shah I	Sultan of Kedah; 1321–1373	Succeeded by Sulaiman Shah I
