= Muhammad Jiwa Zainal Adilin I of Kedah =

Sultan of Kedah (r. 1473–1506)

Muhammad Jiwa Zainal Adilin Mu'adzam Shah I محمد جيوا زين العابدين معظم شاه ١
- Sultan of Kedah
- Reign: 1473–1506
- Predecessor: Ataullah Muhammad Shah I
- Successor: Mahmud Shah II
- Died: 15 June 1506; Istana Baginda, Kota Siputih
- Burial: Kota Siputih Royal Cemetery
- Spouse: Tunku Mariam
- Issue: Sultan Mahmud Shah II; Tunku Kutam
- House: Kedah
- Father: Sultan Ataullah Muhammad Shah I
- Mother: Che' Puan Paduka Bonda
- Religion: Sunni Islam

Paduka Sri Sultan Muhammad Jiwa Zainal Adilin Mu'adzam Shah I ibni al-Marhum Sultan Ataullah Muhammad Shah I (Jawi: ڤدوك سري سلطان محمد جيوا زين العابدين معظم شاه ١ ابن المرحوم سلطان عطاء الله محمد شاه ١; died 15 June 1506; also spelt Sultan Muhammad Jiwa Zain al-‘Adilan Mu’azzam Shah) was the ninth Sultan of Kedah. His reign was from 1473 to 1506 and was marked by land reform and the encouragement of the use of gold and silver for trading instead the barter system.

Muhammad Jiwa Zainal Adilin I of Kedah House of Kedah Died: 15 June 1506
Regnal titles
Preceded by Ataullah Muhammad Shah I	Sultan of Kedah; 1473–1506	Succeeded by Mahmud Shah II
