= Muzzil Shah of Kedah =

Sultan of Kedah (r. 1237–1280)

Muzzil Shah مزعل شاه
- Sultan of Kedah
- Reign: 23 October 1237 – 24 August 1280
- Predecessor: Muhammad Shah
- Successor: Mahmud Shah I
- Died: 24 August 1280; Kota Sungai Mas, Kedah
- Burial: Kota Sungai Mas Royal Cemetery
- Issue: Sultan Mahmud Shah I Tunku Ahmad
- House: Kedah
- Father: Muhammad Shah
- Religion: Sunni Islam

Paduka Sri Sultan Muzzil Shah ibni al-Marhum Sultan Muhammad Shah (Jawi: ڤدوك سري سلطان مزعل شاه ابن المرحوم سلطان محمد شاه; died 24 August 1280) was the fourth sultan of Kedah. He reigned from 1237 to 1280. He moved his capital from Kota Meriam to Kota Sungai Mas.

Muzzil Shah of Kedah House of Kedah Died: 24 August 1280
Regnal titles
Preceded by Muhammad Shah	Sultan of Kedah; 1237–1280	Succeeded by Mahmud Shah I
