= Hikayat Merong Mahawangsa =

Kedah Annals

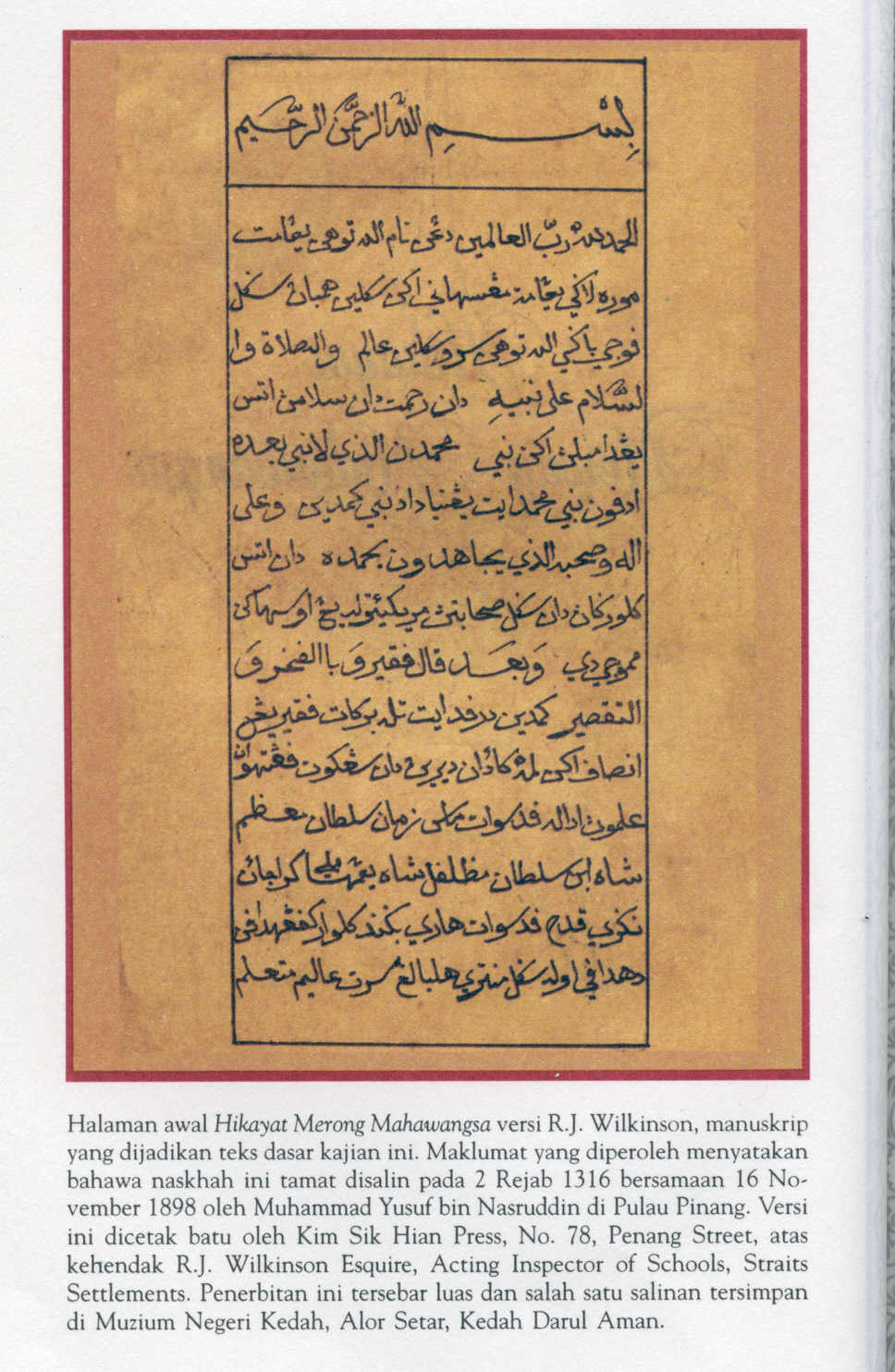
The Hikayat Merong Mahawangsa in Jawi script

The Hikayat Merong Mahawangsa (Jawi: حكاية مروڠ مهاوڠسا), alternatively spelt Hikayat Marong Mahawangsa and also known as the Kedah Annals, is a Malay literary work that gives a romantic account of the history and tales relating to the Malay kingdom of Kedah. The work is thought to have been written in the late 18th century or some time in the 19th century. Although it contains historical facts, there are also many incredible assertions in its accounts. The era covered by the text ranged from the opening of Kedah by Merong Mahawangsa, described as a descendant of Dhu al-Qarnayn until the acceptance of Islam.

== Summary ==
The beginning part of the story elaborates on the stories of kings and the founding of their kingdoms based on semi-historical, legends or fantastical folk stories, whether its origins are indigenous or influenced Islamic elements. The annals tells of the progenitor of all the Kedahan rulers, Raja Merong Mahawangsa; a king who has family ties to the Tribunes or Forum of the Romans.

The royal fleet of Merong Mahawangsa, whilst sailing from Rome to China, was attacked by a legendary giant phoenix called Garuda. He crashed into the shores of what is now Kedah. There, he founded a state called Langkasuka ('Langkha' meaning 'resplendent land' in Sanskrit, while 'sukkha' meaning 'joy' or 'happiness') and became its king. He returned to Rome after his son Raja Merong Mahapudisat was enthroned. Langkasuka eventually changed its name to the Kedah Zamin Turan.

Guided by the advice given by his father, Mahapudisat would later divide the Kingdom into three; the Kingdom of Siam to his eldest son, the Kingdom of Perak to his second and the Kingdom of Pattani to his youngest. The youngest son succeeded their father as King of Kedah with the title of Raja Seri Mahawangsa. Raja Seri Mahawangsa began the tradition of sending "flowers of gold and silver" as gifts to the Siamese King every time he bore a son.

Raja Seri Mahawangsa died of a heart attack after getting upset with his son, due to him being unfilial child. His son succeeded him with the title of Raja Seri Inderawangsa. Next in line was Inderawangsa's son Raja Ong Maha Perita Deria, also known as Raja Bersiong, or the Fanged King. When the king was overthrown by his subjects due to his wickedness, his son was enthroned with the title of Raja Phra Ong Mahapudisat. Phra Ong Mahapudisat was succeeded by his son, Raja Phra Ong Mahawangsa who later converted into Islam and changed his name to Sultan Mudzafar Shah.

The annals also describe the Chola Empire's trade relations with Kedah, where the Kedah Sultanate are sent its tribute to the empire every year and after to Siam. Antique and deva statues of Chola Dynasty are still found in Kedah after their conquest. The Kedahan royal family traces their lineage back to Phra Ong Mahawangsa, and thus Merong Mahawangsa.

== The descendants of Merong Mahawangsa ==
Below is the list of the eight rulers of Langkasuka, Merong and his descendants, according to the Kedah Annals:

- Raja Merong Mahawangsa: A ruler from Rome who later settled in Bujang Valley and founded the Kingdom of Langkasuka. He is said to be a descendant of Alexander the Great. Merong had three sons, Merong Mahapudisat, Ganjil Sarjuna, and Seri Mahawangsa, and a daughter, Raja Puteri, who is the second youngest in the family. He was later succeeded by his eldest son, Merong Mahapudisat. Merong then returned to Rome, leaving his son the ruler of Langkasuka.
- Raja Merong Mahapudisat: He became the king of Langkasuka after his father, Merong Mahawangsa returned to Rome. He was the eldest son. Legends say that he was also the first king of Siam.
- Raja Ganji Sarjuna: He was crowned king after his brother's death. He was the second eldest in the family. He founded the Gangga Negara kingdom.
- Raja Puteri (in English, King Princess): She became the King of Langkasuka after her brother Ganjil Sarjuna died. She is the youngest daughter in the family. She was also the first ruler of Pattani.
- Raja Seri Mahawangsa: He became the king of Langkasuka after his brother, Ganjil Sarjuna died.
- Raja Ong Maha Perita Deria: He is the son of Raja Seri Maha Inderawangsa, who is the grandson of Raja Merong Mahawangsa. His father was married to an ogre. He was called "Raja Bersiong" or the Fanged King because of his cannibalistic behaviour of drinking human blood. He was the successor of Raja Seri Maha Inderawangsa, but because of his behaviour, the ministers of the kingdom had no choice but to revolt against him. He fled to Mount Jerai, where he remained hidden for a long time and later had a son, who was called Phra Ong Mahapudisat. His son, unknowing of his royal lineage, lived in his mother's village before being called to the palace and had his identity revealed. The story of "Raja Bersiong" has been read as a symbol of a pre-Islamic order.
- King Phra Ong Mahapudisat: After Seri Mahawangsa's death, Langkasuka needed a successor that had a royal blood. Phra Ong Mahapudist was crowned king after his father's death.
- Sultan Mudzafar Shah, Phra Ong Mahawangsa: He was the only son of Phra Ong Mahapudisat. He was originally Hindu, but when Islam first came to the Malay Peninsula, he became a Muslim, changed his name into Sultan Mudzafar Shah, and the Kingdom of Langkasuka into the Kedah Sultanate.

== In popular culture ==
KD Mahawangsa is a vessel of the Royal Malaysian Navy named in honour of the first monarch.

Raja Bersiong was a 1968 Malay-language film based on the legend of the sixth monarch and his alleged cannibalism.

A 2011 epic action adventure film loosely based on the myth was produced by KRU Studios also titled Hikayat Merong Mahawangsa (also known by its international title The Malay Chronicles: Bloodlines), directed by Yusry Abdul Halim.

== See also ==
- Hikayat Hang Tuah
- Sejarah Melayu
- Sultanate of Kedah
