= Kedah Sultanate =

Sultanate in the Malay Peninsula

Sultanate of Kedah كسلطانن قدح (Malay) Kesultanan Kedah
- 330–1136 (Old Kedah); 1136–1821; 1842–1945; 1948–present
- Flag Coat of arms
- Anthem: Allah Selamatkan Sultan Mahkota; God Save the Crowned Sultan (since 1937)
- Kedah in present-day Malaysia
- Status: Old Kedah (330–1136); Independent sultanate (1136–1821); State of Siam (1821–1842); Independent sultanate (1842–1909); Protectorate of the United Kingdom (1909–1941; 1945–1946)
- Capital: Alor Setar; Anak Bukit
- Common languages: Malay; Kedah Malay; English; Chinese; Tamil; Aslian
- Religion: Sunni Islam
- Government: Absolute monarchy (1136–1941; 1945–1946; 1948–1957); Parliamentary constitutional monarchy within Malaysia (since 1957)
- Sultan
  - 1136–1179: Mudzaffar Shah I (first)
  - 2017–present: Sallehuddin
- Advisor
  - 1909–1915; 1918–1919: George Maxwell
- Legislature: None (rule by decree) (1136–1905); Kedah State Council (1905–1941; 1945–1946; 1948–1959); Kedah State Legislative Assembly
- Historical era: Early modern period
  - Conversion to Islam: 1136; 890 years ago
  - Golden Age: 1735
  - Annexed by Siam: November 1821
  - Anglo-Siamese Treaty of 1909: 9 July 1909
  - Japanese occupation: 16 February 1942
  - Annexed by Thailand: 18 October 1943
  - Japanese surrender; returned to United Kingdom: 14 August 1945
  - Admitted into the Malayan Union: 31 March 1946
  - Restored and admitted into the Federation of Malaya: 1 February 1948

Population
  - 1931: 429,691
- Currency: Native gold and silver coins Straits dollar (until 1939); Malayan dollar (1939–1953)
Preceded by
Kedah Kingdom
Srivijaya
Succeeded by
1948: Federation of Malaya
∟Kedah
1946: Malayan Union
1942-43: Japanese Occupation
Syburi
1821: Kingdom of Siam
- Today part of: Malaysia
- ^{1} Remains as capital until today^{2} Malay using Jawi (Arabic) script

The Kedah Sultanate (Malay: كسلطانن قدح) is a Muslim dynasty located in the Malay Peninsula. It was originally an independent state, but became a British protectorate in 1909. Its monarchy was abolished after it was added to the Malayan Union but was restored and added to the Malayan Union's successor, the Federation of Malaya.

The information regarding the formation of this sultanate and the history before and after its creation comes from the "Kedah Annals". The annals were written in the 18th century, over a millennium after the formation of the supposed Kedah Kingdom. It describes the first king of Kedah as arriving on the shores of Kedah as a result of an attack by a mythical gigantic beast. It states that the nation was founded by the offspring of Alexander the Great. However, Thai chronicles mention that Kedah was a Thai city like Nakhon Si Thammarat and was a part of the Siamese kingdom but later was changed into a Malay state after invasion by Muslim kingdoms until today.

The Kedah Annals provides unreliable information on the sultans of Kedah, listing the first sultan of Kedah as Sultan Mudzafar Shah I in 1136, while an Acehnese account gives the conversion of Kedah to Islam in 1474. Although not impossible, the year 1136 is also unlikely since it pre-dates the Terengganu Inscription Stone by almost three centuries. Claims made by the Kedah Annals also directly contradict the fact that the Buddhist Srivijaya kingdom was in direct control of Kedah at the time Sultan Mudzafar Shah I allegedly converted the region to a sultanate. Kedah may have remained Hindu-Buddhist until the 15th century.

== History ==
Map of Old Kedah and the early transpeninsular routeway

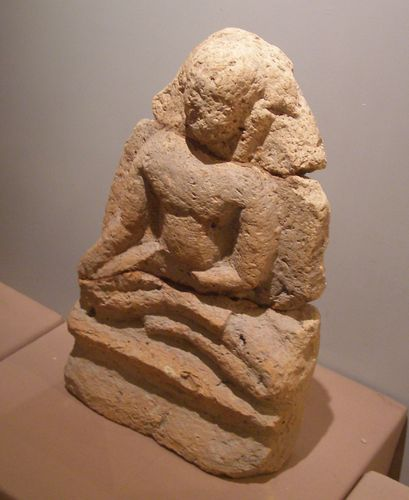
Stone sculpture sitting in the Lotus position found in Kedah

By around 788 BCE, a systematic government of a large settlement of Malay native of Kedah had been established around the northern bank of the Merbok River. The state consisted of a large area of the Bujang Valley, covering the Merbok and Muda River branches in an approximately 1,000-square mile area. The capital of the settlement was built at the estuary of a branch of the Merbok River, now known as Sungai Batu. Around 170 CE, groups of Hindus arrived at Kedah, who were soon joined by peoples from nearby islands and from the northern Mon-Khmer region. At the same time, traders from India, Persia and the Arabian Peninsula arrived at the brink of the Malacca Strait, using Gunung Jerai (the Kedah Peak) as a marking point. Ancient Kedah covered the areas of Kuala Bahang, Kuala Bara, Kuala Pila and Merpah.

=== The king from Gombroon ===
According to the At-Tarikh Salasilah Negeri Kedah, written by Muhammad Hassan bin Dato' Kerani Muhammad Arshad in 1928, in around 630 CE, Maharaja Derbar Raja of Gombroon (now known as Bandar Abbas) in Persia was defeated in battle and escaped to Sri Lanka, and was later blown off course by a storm to the remote shores of Kuala Sungai Qilah, Kedah. The inhabitants of Kedah found him to be a valiant and intelligent person and made him the king of Kedah. In 634 CE, a new kingdom was formed in Kedah consisting of Persian royalty and native Malay people of the Hindu faith; the capital was Langkasuka.

=== Conversion to Islam ===
Based on the account given in Hikayat Merong Mahawangsa (also known as the Kedah Annals), the Sultanate of Kedah was formed when King Phra Ong Mahawangsa converted to Islam and adopted the name Sultan Mudzafar Shah. At-Tarikh Salasilah Negeri Kedah described the conversion to Islam as starting in 1136 AD. However, historian Richard Winstedt, quoting an Acehnese account, gave 1474 as the year of conversion to Islam by the ruler of Kedah. This later date lines up with an account in the Malay Annals, which describes a raja of Kedah visiting Malacca during the reign of its last sultan seeking the honour of the royal band that marks the sovereignty of a Malay Muslim ruler. The request by Kedah was in response to be Malacca's vassal, probably due to fears of Ayutthayan aggression.

=== British colonisation of Penang and Seberang Perai ===
The first British vessel arrived in Kedah in 1592. In 1770, Francis Light was instructed by the British East India Company (EIC) to take Penang from Kedah. He achieved this by assuring Sultan Muhammad Jiwa Zainal Adilin II that his army would protect Kedah from any Siamese invasion. In return, the Sultan agreed to hand over Penang to the British. However, Light made the agreement without the consent of his superiors in India. The EIC did not provide military support, as promised by Light, when Siam attacked Kedah. The Sultan demanded that Light return Penang, but Light was reluctant to hand it back. He offered compensation for the damage but was refused by the Sultan. In 1790, Abdullah planned to launch an amphibious invasion of the island of Penang to recapture it. The EIC, with the help of the British military made a preemptive strike and attacked Kedah's navy and fort in Seberang Perai, damaging them. The Sultan signed a ceasefire agreement with Light in 1791.

On 7 July 1800, while George Alexander William Leith was Lieutenant-Governor of Penang, a treaty came into effect that gave the British sovereignty over Seberang Perai, subsequently named Province Wellesley. The treaty, negotiated by Penang's First Assistant George Caunter and Sultan of Kedah Dziaddin Mukarram Shah II, increased the annual payment to the sultan from 6,000 to 10,000 Spanish dollars. While the acquisition improved Penang Island's military and food security, for Kedah it provided a protective strip against enemy attack from the sea. The treaty also provided for the free flow of food and commodities from Kedah to Penang Island and Province Wellesley. To this day, the Malaysian federal government still pays Kedah, on behalf of Penang, RM 10,000 annually as a symbolic gesture.

=== Partition of Kedah and Siamese vassalage ===
Flag of Kedah (1821–1912)

After the death of Sultan Abdullah Mukarram Shah in 1797, the throne was given to his half brother Sultan Dziaddin Mukarram Shah II. However Sultan Dziaddin was forced to abdicate in 1803 by the King of Siam and was replaced by his nephew Sultan Ahmad Tajuddin II. This sparked a succession crisis as crown prince, Tunku Bisnu claimed to be the rightful heir to the throne. Fearing civil war, Siam reconciled the two parties by appointing Tunku Bisnu as ruler of Setul, thus establishing the Kingdom of Setul Mambang Segara in 1808.

From 1821, a Siamese invasion of Kedah fragmented Kedah's territory. This period marked the exile of Sultan Ahmad Tajuddin Halim Shah II and the imposition of direct Siamese rule on Kedah for a time. Tengku Kudin, a nephew of Sultan Ahmad Tajuddin, captured Alor Setar from the Siamese in 1831 but the town was retaken soon after. After 20 years of living in exile, Sultan Ahmad Tajuddin was restored to the throne of Kedah in 1842.

In 1892, the kingdom was reunified with the Kedah Sultanate. However, the assimilation of the Siamese people and their culture in Setul had weakened Kedah rule over it. The Anglo-Siamese Treaty in 1909 finally ended Kedahan rule over Setul, as the Siamese and British agreed to exclude Setul from Kedah's jurisdiction.

== List of rulers ==
The list of rulers of Kedah as given here is based to some extent on the Kedah Annals beginning with the Hindu ruler Durbar Raja I. According to the Kedah Annals, the 9th Kedah maharaja, Derbar Raja, converted to Islam and changed his name to Sultan Muzaffar Shah, thereby starting the Kedah sultanate. A genealogy was compiled in the 1920s, Al-Tarikh Salasilah Negeri Kedah Darul Aman or Kedah Genealogy. The historicity and the dating of the list of rulers however is questionable as Kedah may have remained Hindu-Buddhist until the 15th century when its king converted to Islam.

=== Hindu era ===
The following is a list of kings of Kedah Kingdom. Each used the Hindu title of Sri Paduka Maharaja. The exact dates of each king's reign are not known, and the dates given are speculative.

1. Durbar Raja I (330–390)
2. Diraja Putra (390–440)
3. Maha Dewa I (440–465)
4. Karna Diraja (465–512)
5. Karma (512–580)
6. Maha Dewa II (580–620)
7. Maha Dewa III (620–660)
8. Diraja Putra II (660–712)
9. Darma Raja (712–788)
10. Maha Jiwa (788–832)
11. Karma II (832–880)
12. Darma Raja II (880–956)
13. Durbar Raja II (956–1136; succeeded as Sultan of Kedah, see below)

Source for the list of sultans is the Muzium Negeri Kedah, Alor Setar, Malaysia. "The sultans of Kedah".

=== Islamic era ===
Sultan of Kedah
- Provincial
- Arms of His Royal Highness the Sultan of Kedah

Incumbent
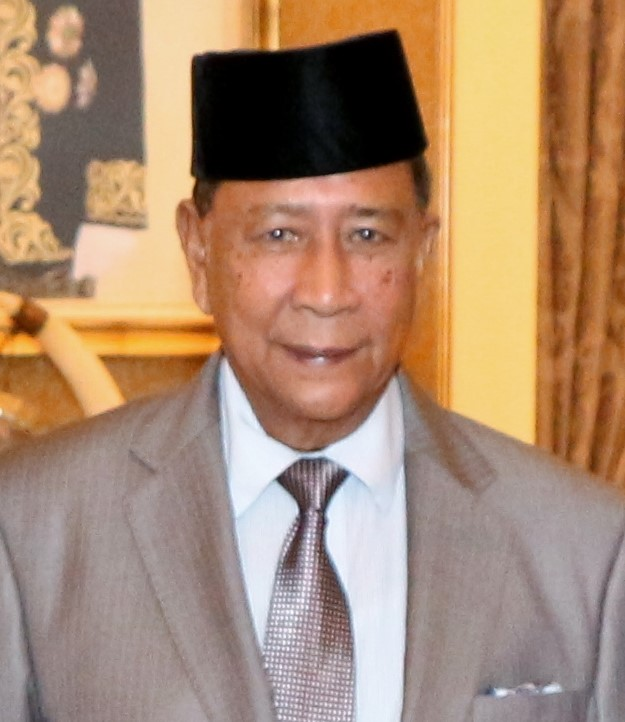
- Sallehuddin since 12 September 2017
- installation 22 October 2018

Details
- Style: His Royal Highness
- Heir apparent: Tunku Sarafuddin Badlishah
- First monarch: Mudzaffar Shah I (first)
- Formed: 1136; 890 years ago
- Residences: Istana Anak Bukit, Alor Setar

The beginning of the use of the title sultan in Kedah is attributed to a visit by a Muslim scholar from Yemen, Sheikh Abdullah bin Ja'afar Quamiri, to Durbar Raja II's palace at Bukit Meriam in 1136. The audience resulted in the king's conversion to Islam. He adopted the name Mudzaffar Shah and established the Sultanate of Kedah.

The source for the list of sultans given here is the official genealogy given for the Sultan of Kedah. There are however discrepancies with the Kedah Annals as it lists only five sultans from the first convert Mudzaffar Shah to Sulaiman Shah, who was captured by Aceh in 1619, in contrast to the twelve listed here. The rest of the list largely follows as that given in the Kedah Annals with the exception of a few changes and more recent updates in the 20th and 21st century.

Sultans of Kedah
Number	Sultan	Reign
1	Mudzaffar Shah I	1136–1179
2	Mu'adzam Shah	1179–1202
3	Muhammad Shah	1202–1237
4	Muzzil Shah	1237–1280
5	Mahmud Shah I	1280–1321
6	Ibrahim Shah	1321–1373
7	Sulaiman Shah I	1373–1423
8	Ataullah Muhammad Shah I	1423–1473
9	Muhammad Jiwa Zainal Adilin Mu'adzam Shah I	1473–1506
10	Mahmud Shah II	1506–1547
11	Mudzaffar Shah III	1547–1602
12	Sulaiman Shah II	1602–1626
13	Rijaluddin Muhammad Shah	1626–1652
14	Muhyiddin Mansur Shah	1652–1662
15	Dziaddin Mukarram Shah I	1662–1688
16	Ataullah Muhammad Shah II	1688–1698
17	Abdullah Mu'adzam Shah	1698–1706
18	Ahmad Tajuddin Halim Shah I	1706–1710
19	Muhammad Jiwa Zainal Adilin Mu'adzam Shah II	1710–1778
20	Abdullah Mukarram Shah	1778–1797
21	Dziaddin Mukarram Shah II	1797–1803
22	Ahmad Tajuddin Halim Shah II	1803–1821
–	Siamese invasion of Kedah	1821–1842
(22)	Ahmad Tajuddin Halim Shah II	1842–1845
23	Zainal Rashid Al-Mu'adzam Shah I	1845–1854
24	Ahmad Tajuddin Mukarram Shah	1854–1879
25	Zainal Rashid Mu'adzam Shah II	1879–1881
26	Abdul Hamid Halim Shah	1881–1943
27	Badlishah Shah	1943–1958
28	Abdul Halim Mu'adzam Shah	1958–2017
29	Sallehuddin	2017–present

== Culture ==
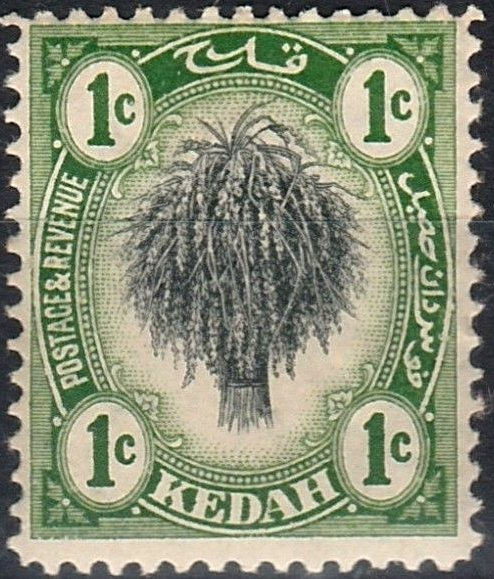
Stamp of Kedah, 1912

=== Nobat ===
The nobat musical instruments of Nagara and Nepiri were introduced to Kedah by Maharaja Derbar Raja. The instrument is also called semambu. The band is led by the king, and it consists of drums, a gong, a flute and a trumpet. Today, nobat is a royal orchestra, played only during royal ceremonies such as inaugurations, weddings, and funerals. The building which houses the instruments and where the ensemble rehearses is known as the Balai Nobat, literally the Office of Nobat, in Alor Setar city proper.

== See also ==
- Bujang Valley
- Hikayat Merong Mahawangsa
- Sultanate of Johor
- Sultanate of Malacca
- Sultanate of Singgora
- Kingdom of Kubang Pasu Darul Qiyam, another historical Malay Kingdom born during the Partition of Kedah
- Family tree of Kedah monarchs
- Family tree of Malaysian monarchs
- List of Sunni Muslim dynasties
