= Mahmud Shah I of Kedah =

Sultan of Kedah (r. 1280–1321)

Mahmud Shah I محمود شاه ١
- Sultan of Kedah
- Reign: 24 August 1280 – 22 May 1321
- Predecessor: Muzzil Shah
- Successor: Ibrahim Shah
- Died: 22 May 1321; Istana, Kota Sungai Mas
- Burial: Kota Sungai Mas Royal Cemetery
- Spouse: Tunku Aisha
- Issue: Sultan Ibrahim Shah; Tunku Azlin; Tunku Putri Zubaida
- House: Kedah
- Father: Muzzil Shah
- Religion: Sunni Islam

Paduka Sri Sultan Mahmud Shah I ibni al-Marhum Sultan Muzzil Shah (Jawi: ڤدوك سري سلطان محمود شاه ١ ابن المرحوم سلطان مزعل شاه; died 22 May 1321) was the fifth Sultan of Kedah and reigned from 1280 to 1321. He ordered the construction of Kota Seputih and Kota Di Hulu Sungai Merpah as a fortress from the Tenasserim tribe.

Mahmud Shah I of Kedah House of Kedah Died: 22 May 1321
Regnal titles
Preceded by Muzzil Shah	Sultan of Kedah; 1280–1321	Succeeded by Ibrahim Shah
