= Dziaddin Mukarram Shah I of Kedah =

Sultan of Kedah (r. 1662–1688)

Dziaddin Mukarram Shah I ضياء الدين مكرم شاه ١
- Sultan of Kedah Dar ul-Aman
- Reign: 4 January 1662 – 1 May 1688
- Predecessor: Muhyiddin Mansur Shah
- Successor: Ataullah Muhammad Shah II
- Died: 1 May 1688; Istana Baginda, Kota Indira Kayangan
- Spouse: Wan Jingga; Che' Sepa Chandra
- Issue: Sultan Ataullah Muhammad Shah II; Tunku Safura Negara
Posthumous name
- Al-Marhum Kayang al-Awwal
- House: Kedah
- Father: Muhyiddin Mansur Shah
- Mother: Wan Sara
- Religion: Sunni Islam

Paduka Sri Sultan Dziaddin Mukarram Shah I ibni Almarhum Sultan Muhyiddin Mansur Shah (Jawi: ڤدوك سري سلطان ضياء الدين مكرم شاه ١ ابن المرحوم سلطان محي الدين منصور شاه; died 1 May 1688; also spelt Sultan Ziyauddin Mukarram Shah I or Sultan Dhiauddin Mukarram Shah I) was the 15th Sultan of Kedah and reigned from 1662 to 1688. He established his capital at Wai, in Perlis, which he named Kota Indira Kayangan in August 1664. He accepted Siamese suzerainty and dispatched the first "bunga mas" in January 1674.

Dziaddin Mukarram Shah I of Kedah House of Kedah Died: 1 May 1688
Regnal titles
Preceded by Muhyiddin Mansur Shah	Sultan of Kedah; 1662–1688	Succeeded by Ataullah Muhammad Shah II
