= Mudzaffar Shah III of Kedah =

Sultan of Kedah (r. 1547–1602)

Mudzaffar Shah III مظفر شاه ٣
- Sultan of Kedah Dar ul-Aman
- Reign: 15 January 1547 – 1602
- Predecessor: Mahmud Shah II
- Successor: Sulaiman Shah II
- Died: 3 August 1602
- Burial: Kota Siputih Royal Cemetery
- Spouse: Che' Tempawan
- Issue: Sultan Sulaiman Shah II; Tunku Jahara
- House: Kedah
- Father: Mahmud Shah II
- Mother: Che' Larasari
- Religion: Sunni Islam

Paduka Sri Sultan Mudzaffar Shah III ibni al-Marhum Sultan Mahmud Shah II (Jawi: ڤدوك سري سلطان مظفر شاه ٣ ابن المرحوم سلطان محمود شاه ٢; died 3 August 1602) was the 11th Sultan of Kedah and reigned from 1547 to 1602.

Mudzaffar Shah III of Kedah House of Kedah Died: 3 August 1602
Regnal titles
Preceded by Mahmud Shah II	Sultan of Kedah; 1546–1602	Succeeded by Sulaiman Shah II
