= Mahmud Shah II of Kedah =

Sultan of Kedah (r. 1506–1547)

Mahmud Shah II محمود شاه ٢
- Sultan of Kedah Dar ul-Aman
- Reign: 1506–1547
- Predecessor: Muhammad Jiwa Zainal Adilin Mu'adzam Shah I
- Successor: Mudzaffar Shah III
- Died: 15 January 1547; Istana Baginda, Kota Siputih
- Burial: Kota Siputih Royal Cemetery
- Spouse: Che' Larasari
- Issue: Sultan Mudzaffar Shah III; Tunku Nur Aisha
- House: Kedah
- Father: Sultan Muhammad Jiwa Zainal Adilin Mu'adzam Shah I
- Mother: Tunku Mariam
- Religion: Sunni Islam

Paduka Sri Sultan Mahmud Shah II ibni al-Marhum Sultan Muhammad Jiwa Zainal Adilin Mu'adzam Shah I (Jawi: ڤدوك سري سلطان محمود شاه ٢ ابن المرحوم سلطان محمد جيوا زين العابدين معظم شاه ١; died 15 January 1547) was the tenth Sultan of Kedah and reigned from 1506 to 1547. He changed the name of his realm to Kedah Dar ul-Aman, established a stable currency and encouraged trade.

Mahmud Shah II of Kedah House of Kedah Died: 15 January 1547
Regnal titles
Preceded by Muhammad Jiwa Zainal Adilin Mu'adzam Shah I	Sultan of Kedah; 1506–1547	Succeeded by Mudzaffar Shah III
