= Robert Hunter (merchant) =

Scottish merchant and unofficial diplomat in Siam (1792–1848)

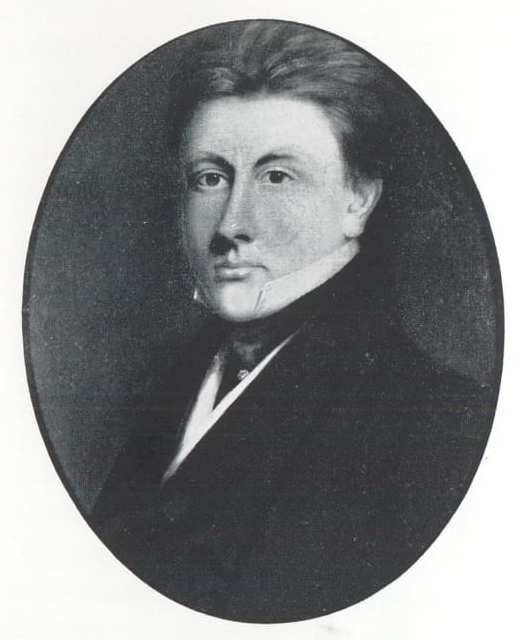
- Born: Hunter (English: Hunter); 27 November 1792; Scotland
- Died: 7 September 1848 (aged 55); Glasgow, Scotland
- Occupation: Diplomat
- Spouse: Angelina Sap
- Writing career
- Language: English

Robert Hunter (27 November 1792 – 7 September 1848) was a British merchant and unofficial diplomat in Siam during the reign of King Rama III. Hunter settled in Bangkok in 1824 and served as an intermediary between Westerners and the court until his departure from the country in 1844 over a trade dispute with the king.

== Family background and settlement in Siam ==
Robert Hunter was born into a family of established Scottish merchants, active since the early 18th century. The Hunters had exported tobacco from Virginia to France, an enterprise ended by the American War of Independence, and then turned to manufacturing glass, cotton and linen from their base in Neilston, southwest of Glasgow. Robert went east to begin his commercial career: first to India, then to newly-founded Singapore where he established Hunter–Watt & Co.

While Hunter was living in Singapore, the East India Company sent its first diplomatic mission to the Kingdom of Siam, but it failed to secure a treaty with King Rama II for trading rights. In July 1824, Rama III succeeded to the throne in Bangkok, and Hunter arrived in August, bearing the calculated gift of a thousand muskets for the new king. After speaking with the Phra Klang (Minister of the Treasury), Hunter was granted the right to trade with foreigners on behalf of the king and nobility, and he was permitted to live in Bangkok. The king ordered a three-story construction erected on the west bank of the Chao Phraya River for Hunter's business and residence.

== Role in diplomacy ==
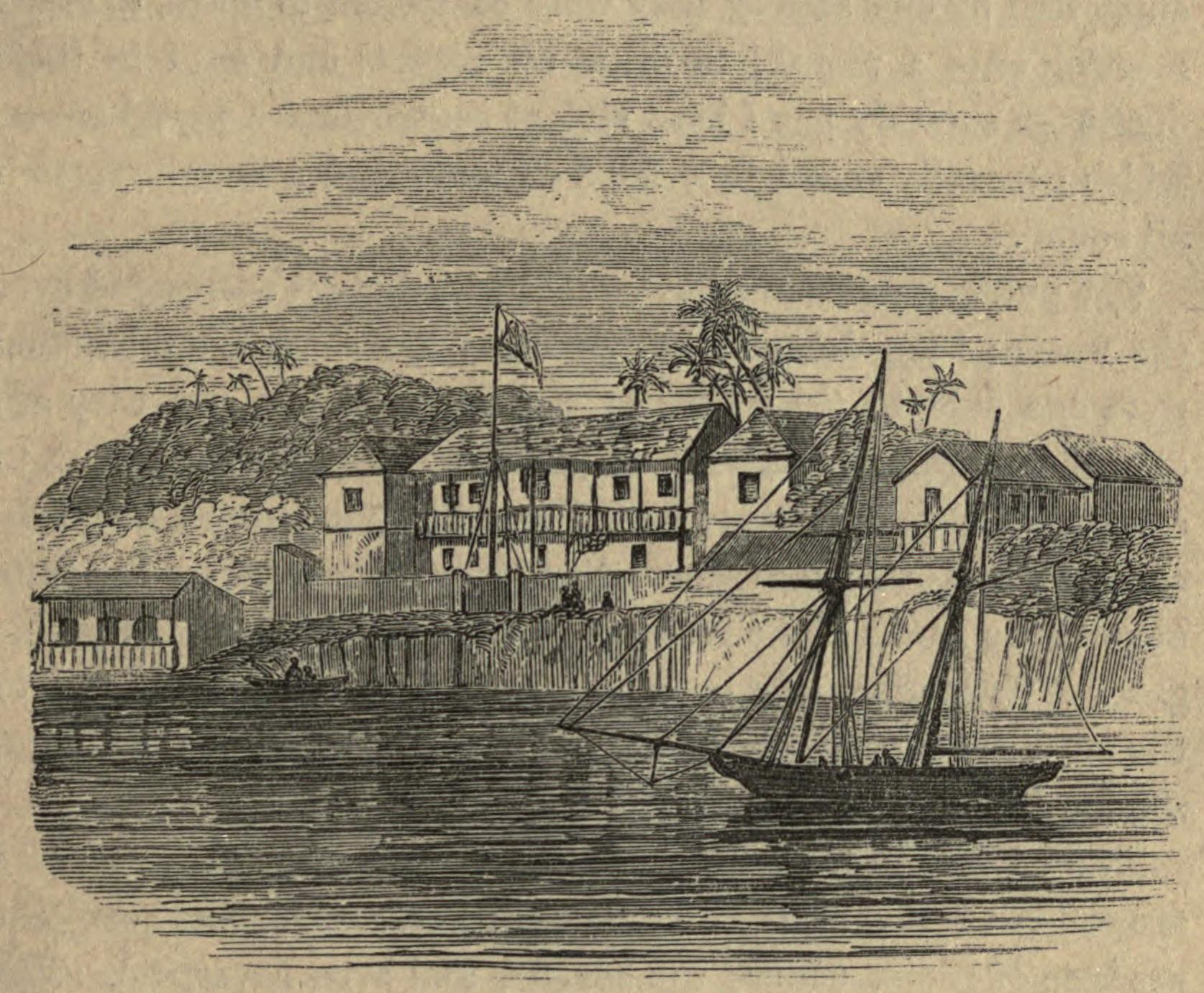
Hunter's residence in Bangkok which served as the de facto British factory

Hunter also secured permission from the king for other Europeans to build on the river bank, and many moved from floating houses into new structures. He lived in the Kudi Chin community, initially owning a large floating house before moving into a Western-style building upon its completion in 1840. His emporium was well known among the populace. Westerners came to refer to Hunter's prominent building as the British factory; in absence of a British embassy or formal Anglo-Siamese diplomatic relations, Hunter personally managed the exchange of goods and visitors between Singapore – the nearest British entrepôt – and Bangkok. He was known for his hospitality to Western visitors and would entertain them: often taking them sailing on his 30-ton cutter, Friends, going on shooting expeditions, playing cards, dining and drinking.

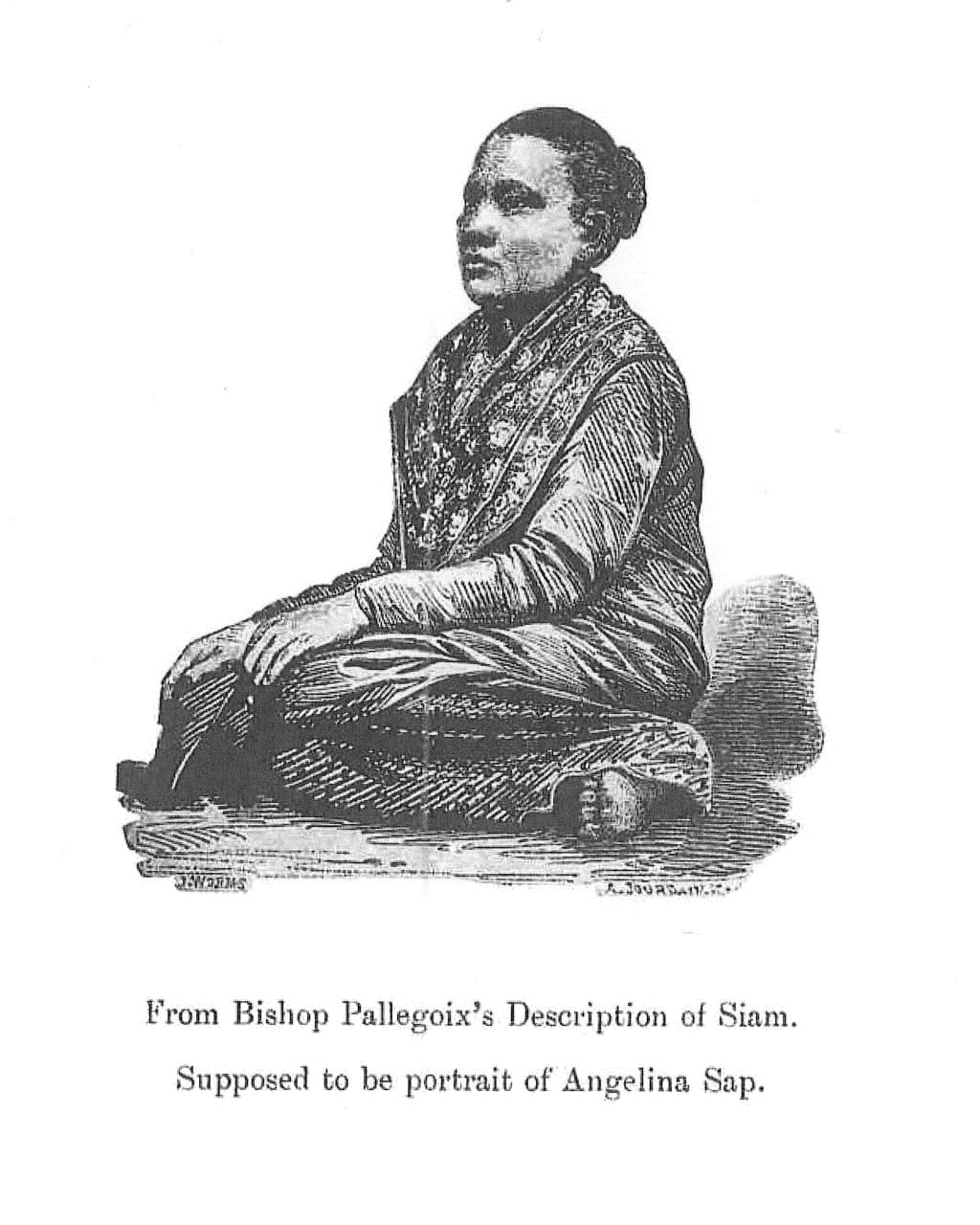
Hunter's wife, Lady Sap (ทรัพย์, Christian name Angelina, 1805 – 1884)

In 1825, Hunter married a half-Portuguese, half-Siamese woman named Angelina Sap who was from a respected Portuguese family and a descendant of Constantine Phaulkon, the 17th-century adventurer in Siam. Through his wife, Hunter learned Portuguese and Thai. There were no other English-speakers present at court, so his fluency in Thai made him crucial in trade and diplomacy between Siamese nobles and visiting merchants.

His privileged position enabled him to guide diplomatic and Christian missions entering the country. He aided Henry Burney's successful treaty mission in 1826, and the governor of Singapore later praised Hunter for a history of "infinite service in our negotiation with [Rama III]". Hunter was also lauded in Siam, receiving the noble title Luang Awutwiset in 1831, which signified his service to the kingdom in supplying weapons. In 1842, he helped negotiate for the restoration of the Sultan of Kedah after 20 years of Siamese occupation.

== "Discovery" of Siamese twins ==
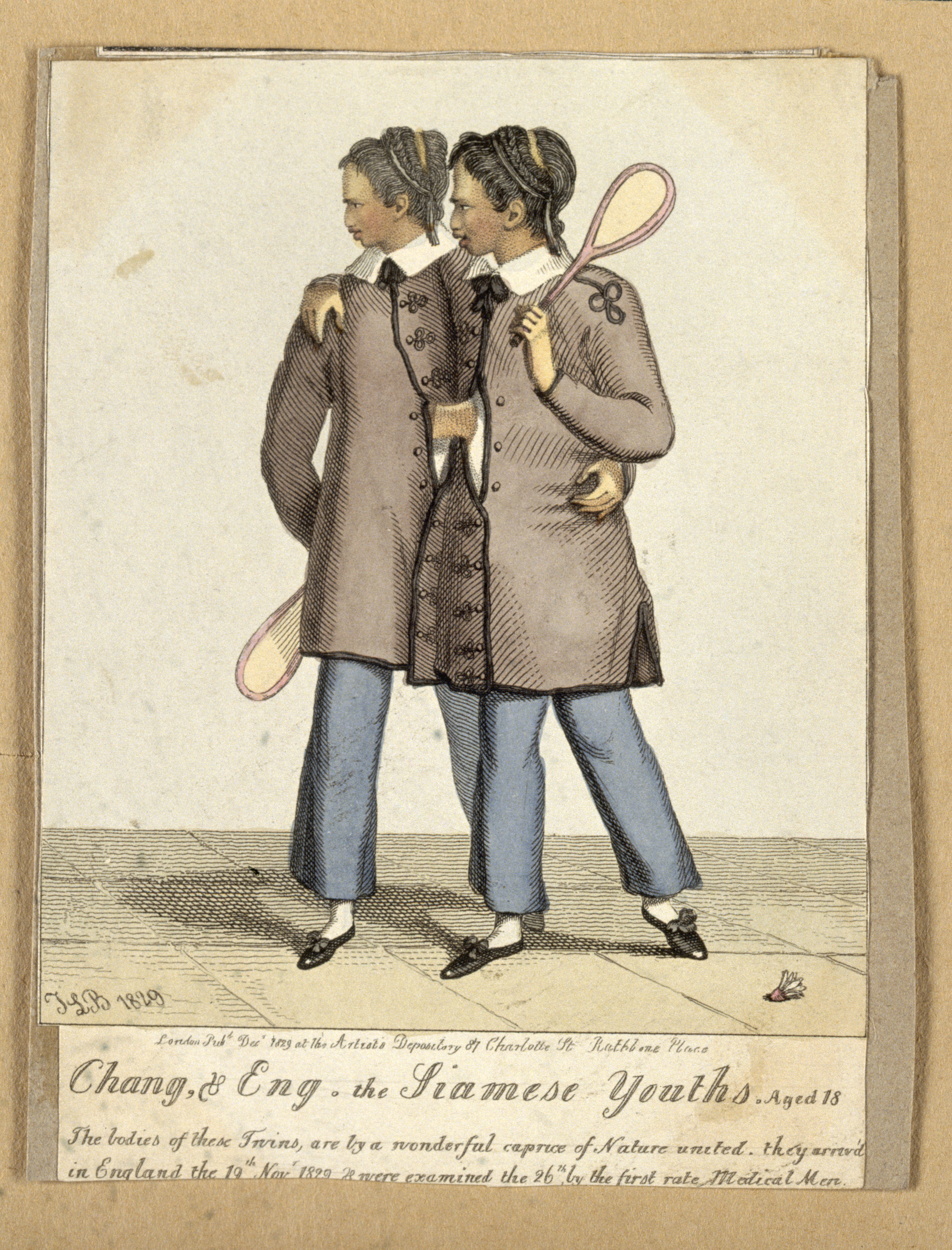
Colored engraving of the Siamese twins, Chang and Eng (1829)

Hunter is credited with bringing the original Siamese twins to global attention. In 1824, he was sailing up the Chao Phraya River at dusk when he saw a "strange animal" – in actuality the shirtless twins bathing. He befriended Chang and Eng, their mother and family, and he told them many stories of the wonders of the western world. He recognized the potential profit in exhibiting them publicly and sought permission from them, their family and the king to bring them to Britain. While the twins and their family were willing, it took five years to secure permission from the king. Hunter's partner in this business venture was American sea captain Abel Coffin. Coffin and Hunter sailed to Boston with the twins in the summer of 1829. They signed a contract with the brothers for a five-year tour, and the value of the contract is disputed. Hunter and Coffin said it was for $3,000, but Chang and Eng said it was for $500.

Hunter and Coffin traveled with Chang and Eng, exhibiting them in Boston, New York and London. After success in London, Coffin went with Chang and Eng on a tour of the British Isles. While in Scotland, the twins stayed as guests at the Hunter family home in Neilston, but Hunter had stayed behind in London. His business in Siam took priority, and he departed on 28 September 1830, bound for Bangkok via Singapore. In 1831, Coffin bought out Hunter's share in the venture. Nevertheless, Hunter remained in contact with the twins and their family in Siam, regularly corresponding with all parties well into the 1840s.

== Origins of conflict with Rama III ==
Hunter partnered in trade with another British merchant, James Hayes. The Burney Treaty granted more trading privileges for all British merchants in Singapore, but Hunter & Hayes dominated the market in Bangkok. They had a monopoly on imports from Britain, which were limited to shipments of textiles from Liverpool, but their business was overwhelmingly in exports, in part because they had a monopoly on the European-type square-rigged vessels which the king's court could use for trade.

In September 1835, an American captain was severely wounded after shooting two pigeons on the grounds of a Buddhist monastery. Two monks fought against him as he tried to retrieve the pigeons, ignorant of his trespass. He was struck hard on the head, and Hunter hurried him into the care of Dan Beach Bradley. He demanded the death penalty for the monks and threatened to call for military intervention by his government if his demands were not met, causing a public stir and distressing the royal court. Rama III explained to Hunter that the monks had their own independent judicial system, and he referred the case to his half-brother in the priesthood – Mongkut, the future king – who issued a lighter verdict to the monks.

As trade increased through the 1830s, the king and nobles acquired their own vessels and began to deal with foreign merchants independently of Hunter. He decided to compensate for his falling profits by trading in opium – which was strictly forbidden in the kingdom at the time. But the king acted cautiously because Siam did not have the naval capability to disrupt opium shipments at sea. Goods laid in port, however, could be easily seized.

In 1839, Hunter & Hayes complained of suffering great losses over the unexpected monopolization of teak and then even greater loss in 1842 when the king introduced a heavy levy on sugar and seized Hunter's stock to collect. Whereas he had once been partners with the king's court in trade, he had grown to be a rival.

== Express incident ==
The climax of the conflict between Hunter and Rama III was over the sale of a steamship.

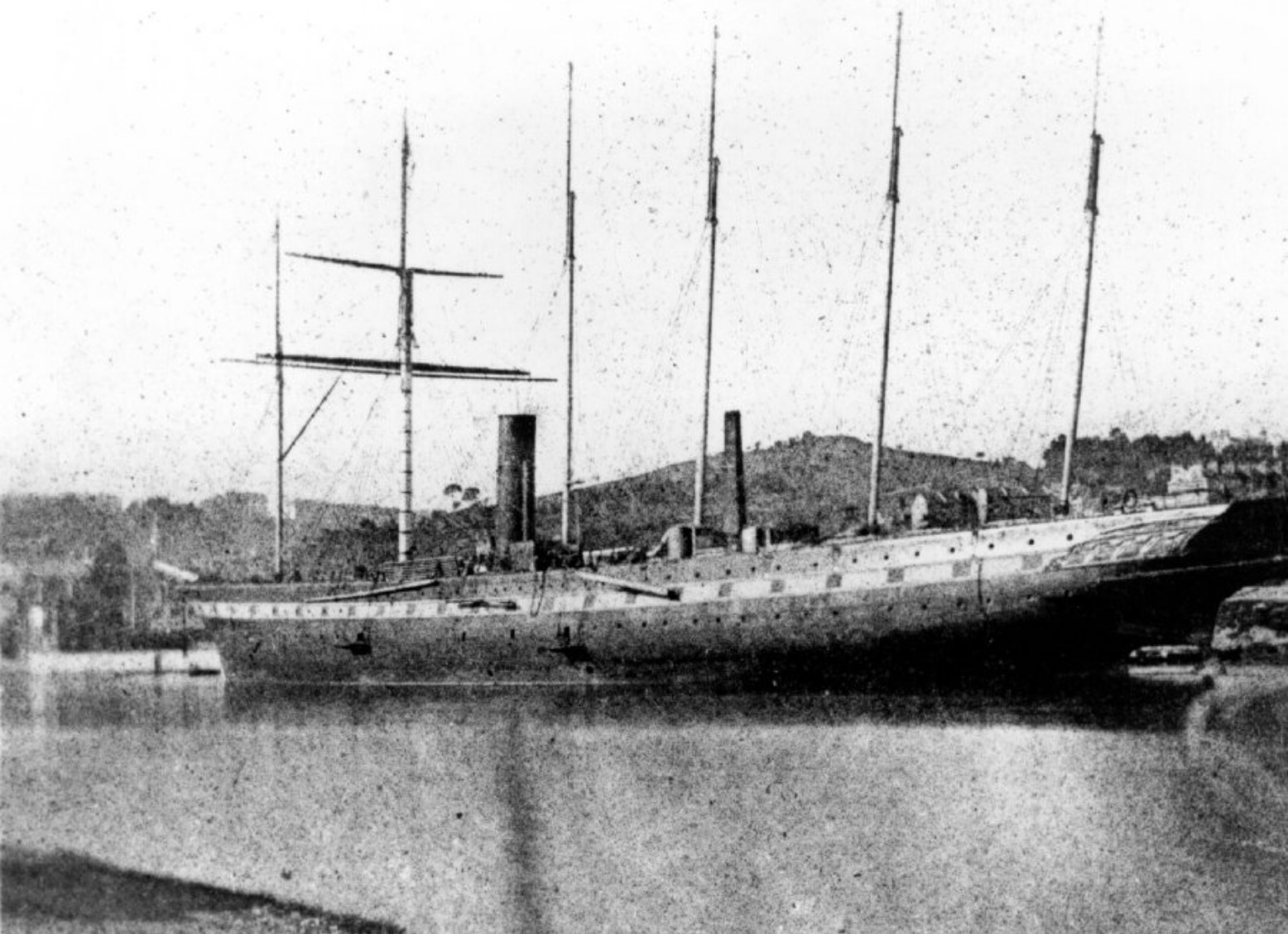
Example of a steamship from the era, SS Great Britain (1844)

Apprehensive of British intentions in the region after the outbreak of the First Opium War, the king had ordered from Hunter & Hayes a large supply of weapons and a steamship to use in the event of war with Britain. The hostilities in China ended with the Treaty of Nanking in 1842, and the conflict ended up not involving Siam. Therefore, the king no longer wanted a steamship by the time Express arrived in Bangkok on 11 January 1844.

The sale of the ship was fraught with disagreement. It is unclear whether the king refused to pay the previously agreed price or if Hunter attempted to extort from him quadruple the value of the vessel, but tensions in the negotiations reached a boiling point when Hunter threatened to sell Express to Siam’s enemy, the Vietnamese in nearby Cochinchina. The king was outraged by the threat and ordered Hunter to leave Siam immediately. On 24 February, Hunter departed Bangkok on Express, bound for Singapore.

Upon landing in Singapore, Hunter lodged a complaint with the colonial governor. Unsatisfied with his response, Hunter steamed Express to Calcutta, the headquarters of the East India Company, to petition for redress of his grievances with the king. He claimed that Rama III had violated articles of the Burney Treaty of 1826, and he recommended the establishment of a British consul in Bangkok, appearance of gunships in the area and a renegotiation of the import duty. The Governor-General of India took no action, however, agreeing with the judgments of his subordinates that any violations on the king's part owed to personal dispute with Hunter and were not instances of systematic breach. Hunter eventually made good on his threat and sold Express at a loss to the Vietnamese for a price of 53,000 Spanish dollars.

Christopher Harvey, an assistant of Hunter & Hayes, continued the business in Bangkok after Hunter’s departure in February. Hunter returned to Bangkok in July to collect his outstanding debts. The king permitted him to enter the country and remove his personal possessions, but he withheld logistical assistance. Hunter then dissolved his enterprise and departed Siam on 29 December 1844.

== Death and legacy ==
Hunter returned to his native Scotland and died at his residence in Lilybank, Glasgow on 7 September 1848. His son, Robert Hunter, Jr., stayed in Siam after his father's departure and enjoyed more favor with the court. He died on 19 April 1865 and was buried in Bangkok Protestant Cemetery.

Hunter was socially adaptable and persuasive, but his "shrewdness, arrogance and fire were more memorable than the streaks of kindness which undoubtedly existed." During the unsuccessful treaty mission of James Brooke in 1850, Rama III cited Hunter's fractious behavior as a reason for rejecting the terms for freer residence of Europeans. The king did not want more troublesome merchants like Hunter, and he distrusted Westerners for the rest of his reign. Siam's foreign relations did not change until the ascension of Mongkut, Rama IV, who signed the Bowring Treaty in 1855. This significantly liberalized trade between the British and Siam, notably allowing for the duty-free importation of opium.
