= Kingdom of Setul Mambang Segara =

Malay Kingdom

Kingdom of Setul Mambang Segara Kerajaan Setul Mambang Segara (Malay) نڬري ستول ممبڠ سڬارا (Jawi) เมืองสตูล (Thai)
- 1808–1916
- Flag

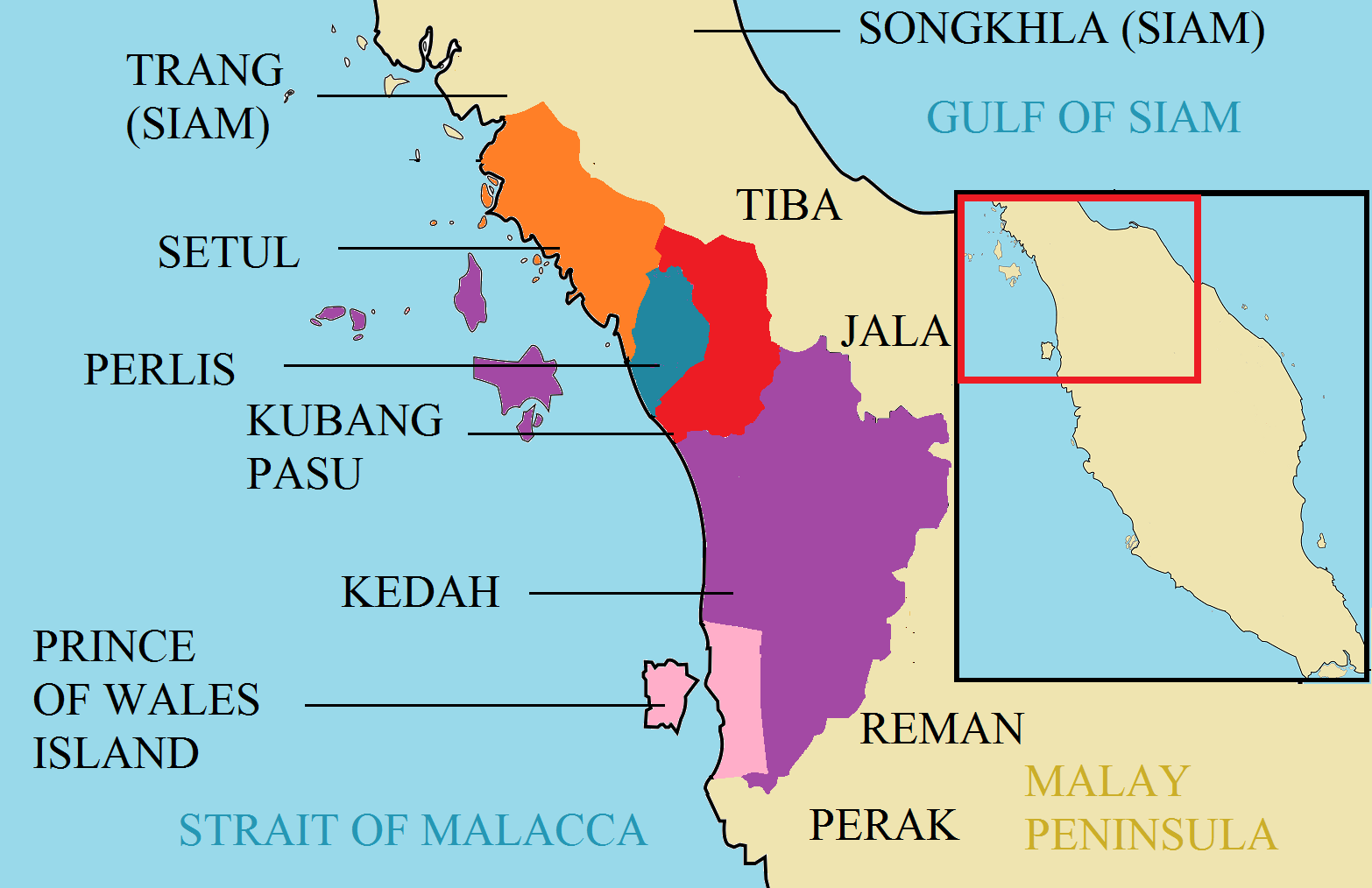
- The four Kedahan dominions by 1860 in colour, after the loss of Terang (Trang) to Siam in 1810, the secession of Prince of Wales Island and Province Wellesley to the British between 1786 and 1860 and the Kedah Partition of 1843 that witnessed the birth of four separate dominions. The four kingdoms are in their respective colours, while other neighbouring polities are in light brown.
- Capital: Kota Mambang Segara
- Common languages: Malay; Kedah Malay; Thai
- Religion: Sunni Islam
- Government: Monarchy
- Raja
  - 1809–1843: Tunku Bisnu ibni al-Marhum Sultan 'Abdu'llah al-Mukarram Shah
  - 1843–1876: Tunku Muhammad Akib ibni al-Marhum Tunku Bisnu
  - 1876–1888: Tunku Ismail ibni al-Marhum Tunku Muhammad Akib
  - 1888–1897: Tunku ‘Abdu’l Rahman ibni al-Marhum Tunku Ismail
  - 1897–1916: Tunku Baharuddin bin Ku Meh
- History
  - Kedah-Setul Partition of 1808: 1808
  - Abdication by the Siamese government: 1916
Preceded by	Succeeded by
Kedah Kingdom	Rattanakosin Kingdom
- Today part of: Thailand; Malaysia

Setul, officially the Kingdom of Setul Mambang Segara (Malay: Kerajaan Setul Mambang Segara; Jawi: نڬري ستول ممبڠ سڬارا; Thai: เมืองสตูล; RTGS: Mueang Satun) was a Malay kingdom founded on the northern coast of the Malay Peninsula. The state was established in 1808 in the wake of the partition between the rulers of the royal house of Kedah. The partition witnessed the territory being seceded to the cadet branch of the royal family. The sovereignty of the kingdom effectively ended in 1916, following the dissolution by the Siamese government. Its borders were largely inherited to its successive province, the present-day Satun, Thailand.

== Etymology ==
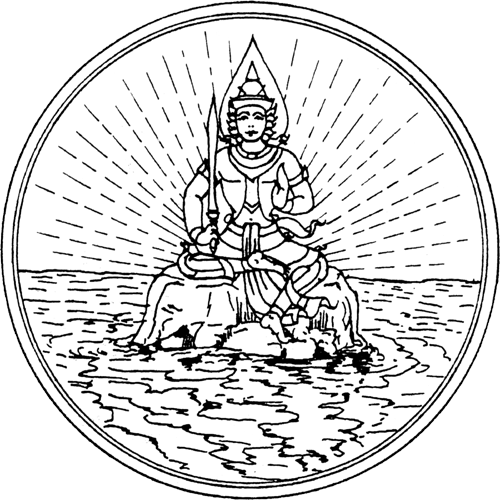
The seal of Satun Province, derives from the honorific title "Mambang Segara" of the old Negeri Setul.

Setul derives its name from Buah Setul, a local name for the cottonfruit tree native to the area, while its honorific title—Mambang Segara—is a Malay variant of the Sea Deity, potentially tied from ancient Malay mysticism due to its location off the western seaboard of the Malay Peninsula. An interpretation of Mambang Segara can also be seen on its present-day provincial seal.

The state was also colloquially referred to as Setoi, a Kedahan Malay cognate of the territory. In the Thai language, the state was known as Satun (Thai: สตูล). The Thai pronunciation was later adopted to the present-day name of the province.

== History ==
=== Origin ===
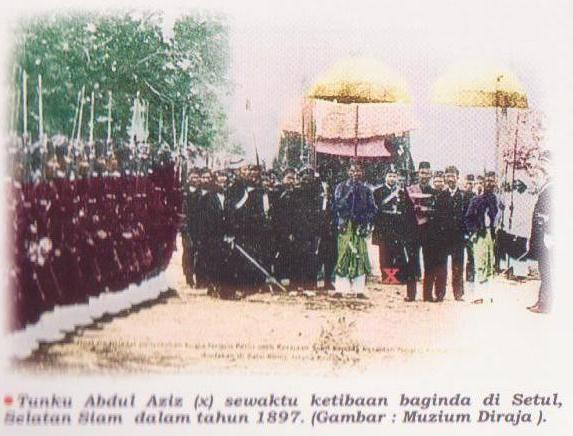
Kedahan Royal Procession in Setul led by Tunku Abdul Aziz, 1897.

Once located in the heartland of Kedah Kingdom, Setul rose to prominence following the death of Abdullah Mukarram Shah, the 20th sultan of Kedah, in 1797. The demise of the monarch resulted in the crowning of Ahmad Tajuddin Halim Shah II as the new sultan. The election was endorsed and recognised by the Rattanakosin Kingdom of Siam, which perceived Kedah as their vassal. The appointment, however, rapidly erupted into a severe secession crisis in the royal house after it was contested by the crown prince, Tunku Bisnu. Aiding to reconcile the two rivalling parties, the Siamese appointed Tunku Bisnu as the ruler of Setul, signifying the birth of Kedah into two separate realms.

Tunku Bisnu spent most of his reign in Kedah in Setul, with local affairs being mainly administrated by his aide, Dato' Wan Abdullah. Nonetheless, as recorded by Syair Sultan Maulana, it was narrated that Tunku Bisnu was a capable ruler that led the Kedahan troops during the war against the Burmese Konbaung dynasty forces in Salang (present-day Phuket, Thailand).

=== Ratification ===
By 1833, the royal courts of Kedah entered another crisis between Sultan Ahmad Tajuddin Halim Shah II and Tunku Embun (Tunku Yaakub), the crown prince. The crisis was predominantly derived from the sultan's refusal to appoint the crown prince to be the king of Kayang (Perlis) and Setul. This resulted in Tunku Embun having to request military assistance from the governor of Ligor to overthrow the Kedahan government, falsely claiming that the sultan had allied with the British. The armed conflict was known locally as Perang Musuh Berbisik (War of the whispering enemies).

During the war of 1833, the Kedahan militia led by Dato Wan Mad Ali (Dato Setia Sengkara) launched an attack against the Siamese in Terang, Ayer Kelubi and Pulau Panjang. Following the fall of Kedah, Dato Wan Mad Ali was forced to move to Langkawi along with an exodus of 100 Malay families from Setul.

The coup d'état led by Tunku Yaakob proved to be successful, as the sultan was forced to retreat to the British-backed Penang and later exiled in Malacca. Nonetheless, Tunku Yaakob's request to be appointed as the sultan of Kedah was refused. He and his son, Tunku Sulaiwan, were later brutally executed by the order of the Siamese king after he was found guilty of spreading malicious news of the previous sultan.

Following the victory, the Siamese then made border realignments which divided Kedah into four separate territories and appointed Tunku Muhammad Akib, the prince of Tunku Bisnu, as the new king of Setul. The border realignment occurred parallel to the Partition of Pattani fevised by the Siamese earlier in 1809; the partition witnessed the birth of the Malay state of Pattani into seven separate kingdoms.

The partition was ratified by 1843, when Ahmad Tajuddin Halim Shah II, the sultan of Kedah, brought a royal entourage to the Siamese government in Bangkok. The royal entourage consisted of Tunku Anum, the ruler of Kubang Pasu; Syed Hussein, the ruler of Perlis; and Tunku Muhammad Akib, the ruler of Setul. They pledged their loyalty to the Siamese crown, together with a Bunga Mas as a sign of tribute from each of the respective territories. Signifying the birth of the state into four separate dominions.

Despite the fact that Kedah was officially partitioned into four distinct kingdoms, all of the states maintained close economic and kinship ties. Several exemplifications can be witnessed during this era: the royal marriage between Tunku Jahara, a member of Kubang Pasu royalty, and Tunku Ahmad, the prince of Kedah; and in 1904, between Tunku Jura, a Kedahan princess, and Syed Zahir, a royal member of the Setul Kingdom.

=== Post-partition ===
Tunku Ismail seceded to the throne of Setul in 1876 after the death of Tunku Muhammad Akib. The king was alleged to be an incompetent leader in matters of administration. Internal strife in the royal house of Setul caused a relative of Tunku Ismail, Tunku Muhammad, to establish a kingdom in Langu, north of Setul in 1882. Both territories managed to be reunified afterwards after a consolidation by the Siamese government.

There were several infrastructure development projects during the reign of Tunku Ismail, including the construction of several roads, a fort, and the town hall, as well as the management of the rivers in Setul. Tunku Ismail also ordered the construction of a brick prison, enlarging the court, improving the telegram network and introducing the postal service. His rule also witnessed a closer relationship with the Siamese, with the kingdom sending 260 individuals to subdue the Chinese rebellion of Phuket in 1878 together with the troops from Kedah and Perlis. He was awarded the Order of the White Elephant for his active role in aiding the Siamese during the revolt.

Tunku Abdul Rahman replaced Tunku Ismail as the king upon his death in 1888, with Tunku Muhammad appointed as the crown prince. He managed to further develop various infrastructure projects centred around the capital. Despite so, towards the end of his 10-year reign, he became permanently insane.

=== Reformation ===
The vacant seat of the king led Kedah to appoint Tunku Baharuddin bin Ku Meh as governor for the administrative post in Setul. Better known as Ku Din, he was a commander in the Alor Setar prison. Ku Din was known to be a capable leader, nonetheless he did not receive much approval from the general public since he was not a member of the Setul royalty.

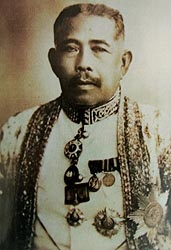
Tunku Baharuddin bin Ku Meh (Ku Din), the last King of Setul, 1902.

The appointment of Ku Din as the governor of Setul angered Tunku Muhammad, the crown prince, as he was supposed to rule the kingdom. As the crown prince did not receive much recognition from the royal courts of Kedah, he sought assistance in Bangkok. His efforts proved to be in vain since Ku Din was far more influential compared to the crown prince. Tunku Muhammad, however, was absorbed into the Satun administration after several months since the appointment of Ku Din.

Ku Din rapidly forged closer ties to the Siamese central government upon his appointment as the governor. He began to send Bunga Mas tributes separately from Kedah. The separate Bunga Mas caused a severe strain in the Kedah-Setul diplomatic relationship, as the possession from the state was customarily sent via Kedah, since both the Siamese and Kedah perceived Setul as a Kedahan principality. The link between the two kingdoms only began to be restored after a reconciliation by Che Ampuan Manyalara, the Queen of Kedah.

Ku Din widely emulated many similar features from the Kedahan administration system, including the introduction of the Head of Education Department, Malay School Headmaster, Chinese Kapitan, Royal Officer Service, Head of the Judicial Court, Kadzi, Head of Medical Department, Head of the Police Force, Chief Auditor, Chief Translator and various other departments. He also improved the police department by recruiting a 36-armed force from Punjab. Ku Din was also known to introduce uniforms for the government servant.

Towards the end of his rule, he launched many rules and regulations that accommodated his pro-Siamese ideals. He started to introduce the Siamese language as the language of the courts and administration, replacing Malay. This led to the resignation of many government officials who are not familiar with the language. His pro-Siamese leadership also caused a resistant movement to develop by local Malays, although the movement was later subdued by the Siamese government.

By 1902, he was proclaimed as king of Setul, bearing the regnal name of Tunku Baharuddin bin Ku Meh. The proclamation was affirmed by the governors of southern Siam and the Siamese government.

=== Dissolution ===
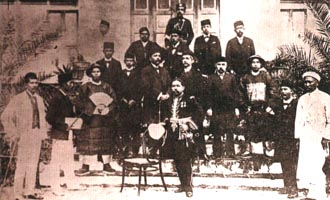
Tunku Baharuddin bin Ku Meh and Setul nobility, c. 1900.

In 1892, Setul was returned to Kedah. Nonetheless, Kedahan sovereignty over Setul was gradually eroded by the Siamese. By 1902, it was evident that Ku Din held full-autonomous power over Setul against Kedah.

The Kedahan jurisdiction in Setul was officially ended by 1909 in wake of the Anglo-Siamese Treaty. The British had planned for an inclusion of Setul together with Kedah and Perlis due to the strong ties between the states but did not manage to succeed in its claim due to the reluctance of the Siamese king.

Tengku Din officially abdicated his position in 1916, six years after the consolidation of Setul into Siam. He was awarded the noble title "Phraya Bhuminathbhakdi" ("The Devoted King") by the Siamese central government for his efforts in developing Setul. He was, however, perceived as a traitor in Kedah for his role in dividing the sultanate.

=== Aftermath ===
The Siamese decided to discontinue the Malay kingship system in Setul. The king was replaced by a governor from Bangkok, Prak Khoja Ishak (Tui Bin Abdullah, later promoted to Phraya Smantaratthaburindra). It was recorded that Setul continued to be developed under his leadership. It was during his rule that the role of Islam continued to flourish and the position of Khadi Besar (Head Khadi) was introduced, a position filled by Dato’ Yutilamdilantik.

Prak Khoja Ishak's administration marked the end of the full Malay-medium of education in the area. The education system reformed and incorporated the Thai language as the medium of instruction. This resulted in a gradual language and identity shift among the Malay community in Setul. Today, only a small percentage of Thai Muslims in Satun are conversant in the language, a far-cry for her historical sister states down south. Presently, the Thai government has already reintroduced Malay language lessons in the curricula in some schools in the province, as a way to help preserve the culture and identity of the modern Thai Malays in Satun.

== Rulers ==
The Raja (King) of Setul	In office
Tunku Bisnu ibni al-Marhum Sultan 'Abdu'llah al-Mukarram Shah	1809–1843
Tunku Muhammad Akib ibni al-Marhum Tunku Bisnu	1843–1876
Tunku Ismail ibni al-Marhum Tunku Muhammad Akib	1876–1888
Tunku ‘Abdu’l Rahman ibni al-Marhum Tunku Ismail	1888–1897
Tunku Baharuddin bin Ku Meh	1897–1916

Descendants

- Sanuputra family - King Vajiravudh had given this surname to Phra Bimolsatyaraksa (Tunku Muhammad, Raja Muda of Setul in the reign of Tunku Abdul Rahman), son of Tunku Ismail ibni al-Marhum Tunku Muhammad Akib and great-grandson of Tunku Bisnu ibni al-Marhum Sultan 'Abdu'llah al-Mukarram Shah in 1916.
- Bin Tamangong family - King Vajiravudh had given this surname to Phraya Bhuminathbhakdi (Tunku Baharuddin bin Ku Meh) in 1915

== Gallery ==
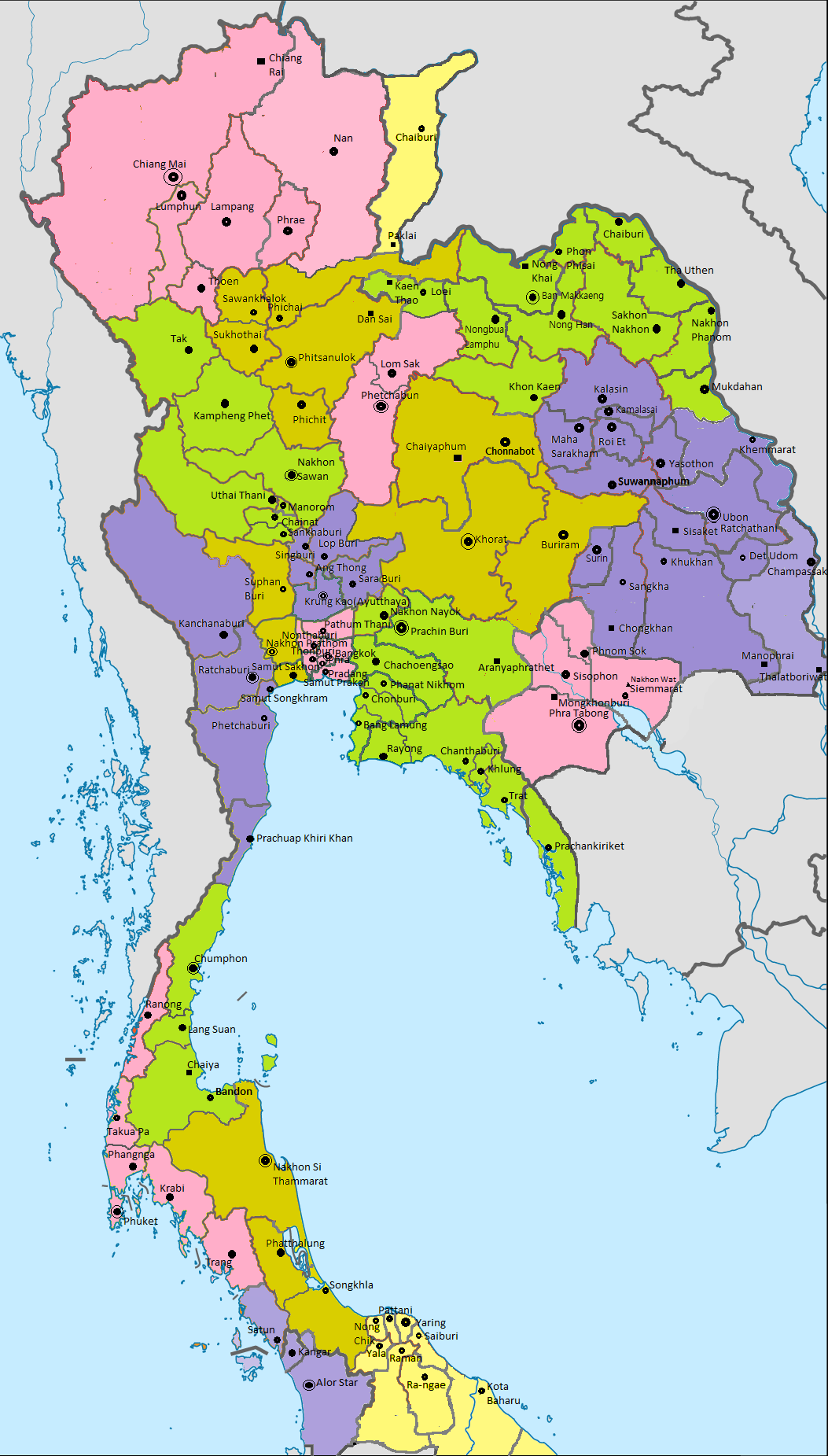
Map of Setul (Satun) as part of Monthon Syburi (Kedah) in 1900

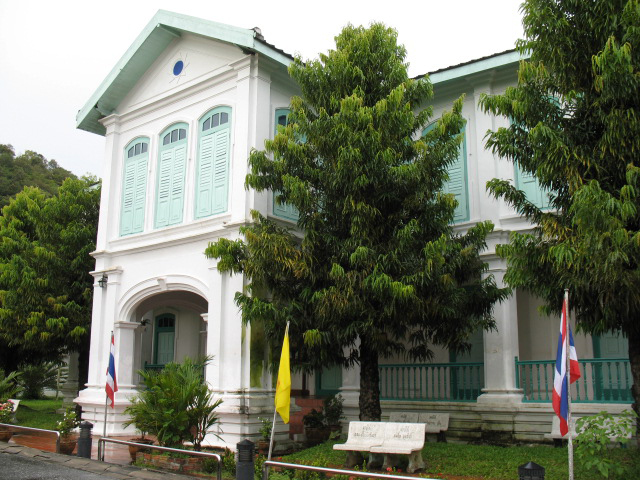
The Kuden Mansion (present-day Satun National Museum), historically constructed by Tunku Baharuddin, the building was erected as a residence of the Siamese King during his visit to the province.

== See also ==
- Kingdom of Kubang Pasu Darul Qiyam, another Malay kingdom formed during the partition of Kedah

== Bibliography ==
- Ahmad Jelani Halimi & Mohd Yusoff Mydin Pitchai (1985), Setoi (Setul) Mambang Segara Dalam Lintasan Sejarah Negeri-Negeri Melayu Utara, Universiti Utara Malaysia
- Burung Murai (2007), Ku Din Ku Meh - Betul ke atau Marang Prapu
- Dato' Hj. Wan Shamsudin bin Mohd. Yusof (2017), Syair Duka Nestapa, archived from the original on 21 September 2019
- DoAsia (2017), พัฒนาการทางประวัติศาสตร์
- Isma (2016), Perjuangan Kedah mempertahankan tanah air, Portal Islam & Melayu, archived from the original on 27 October 2017
- Mahani Musa (n.d.), The Memory of The World Register: The Sultan Abdul Hamid Correspondence and Kedah History (PDF), School of Humanities, Universiti Sains Malaysia
- Mata Hati (2017), Sambungan Kisah Pengkhianatan Tunku Yaakub Terhadap Negeri Kedah, Orang Kedah, archived from the original on 16 November 2017
- MyKedah (n.d.), Pusat- pusat Pentadbiran Kedah Darul Aman Dari Bukit Meriam Ke Kota Star, archived from the original on 4 September 2017
- Ooi Keat Gin (2015), Warisan Wilayah Utara Semenanjung Malaysia, Universiti Sains Malaysia
