= Tok Sayyid Rebellion =

1791 rebellion in Patani against Siamese rule

- Part of the Patani Uprising of 1789–1791
Date	June–July 1791
Location	Patani and Songkhla, Malay Peninsula (present-day southern Thailand)
Result	Siamese victory: Rebellion crushed; Patani laid waste

Belligerents
Rattanakosin Kingdom (Siam); Nakhon Si Thammarat; Songkhla	Patani rebels; Sultanate of Kedah (limited support)

Commanders and leaders
Chao Phraya Suthammamontri; Chao Phraya Inthakirisombat	Abd al-Kamal (Tok Sayyid) †

Strength
Unknown	400 Muslim pilgrimages 3,000-4,000 Patani rebels

Casualties and losses
Unknown	Heavy; ~300 killed at Bo Yang

The Tok Sayyid Rebellion (กบฏโต๊ะสาเหยด; RTGS: Kabot To Sayet) occurred in Patani and Songkhla from June to July 1791, as part of the broader Patani Uprising of 1789–1791 opposed to Siamese rule. According to the Thai chronicles, the leader of the rebellion was Tok Sayyid (โต๊ะสาเหยด); R. Bonney associates this person with Sheikh Abd al-Kamal of Mecca. However, no available source makes this identification explicit. The rebel force was raised with the help of the Patani Kingdom under Tengku Lamidin and received some support from the Sultanate of Kedah. It advanced on Songkhla and was defeated by Siamese troops dispatched from Songkhla and Nakhon Si Thammarat. Tok Sayyid was killed in the course of the battle. Patani was afterwards laid waste.

== Background ==
The uprising launched by Tengku Lamidin against Siamese rule in 1789 was a broader one and the revolt still continued two years later. The conquest of Patani by the Siamese from 1786 to 1787 caused lasting resentment among the Patani chieftains.

In either June or July 1791 a Muslim religious figure went to Kedah with a view to obtaining support for an attack on the Siamese forces in the Patani area. According to Bonney, the reason for his visit was to seek revenge for the way in which a Patani chief had been treated following the conquest. The Sultan of Kedah, Abdullah Mukarram Shah, allowed him to recruit several hundred Hajis and afterwards provided a small amount of arms, but this amount was not enough to carry on the campaign.

The Thai annals also give an account of the same events from the point of view of Siam; they call the leader Tok Sayyid, state that he came from India, and say that he worked with Tengku Lamidin in raising a force against Songkhla. They do not mention Kedah.

== Rebellion ==
The Patani forces set up a camp at the foot of Khao Samrong, behind Khao Luk Chang; on the Siamese side, Chao Phraya Inthakirisombat of Songkhla raised a force and established a camp at Khlong Samrong, then asked for help from the royal court and from Nakhon Si Thammarat. Chao Phraya Suthammamontri came with an army and camped at Ban Bo Toei and at Ban Bo Yang; the two Siamese commanders decided on a date for a joint attack.

Tok Sayyid's forces advanced via Bang Kradan and came up to the front of the Bo Yang camp, where the Nakhon troops opened fire and killed about 300 of his men, causing them to retreat. The troops from Nakhon and Songkhla then pursued the rebels to Talum Bon, where they fought them and managed to drive them back into a camp situated behind Khao Luk Chang. The chronicle states that before the Siamese attack Tok Sayyid scattered holy water at the camp gate. The camp was subsequently stormed and Tok Sayyid was shot and killed; a large number of his followers were killed and the rest fled. Patani was retaken not long after.

== Aftermath ==
After Tok Sayyid died the revolt collapsed. Patani was ruined and the limited help given by Kedah had no impact on the result. This event is included in the final stage of the Patani Uprising of 1789–1791, which concluded with the fall of Perawan, the capture and execution of Tengku Lamidin, and the restoration of Siamese authority over Patani.

== Sources ==
The primary sources used in the episode are R. Bonney's study of Kedah, which is based on materials from the Kedah court, and the Thai chronicles of Songkhla and Phatthalung, published together in 1944.

Bonney states that the leader was Sheikh Abd al-Kamal from Mecca; the Thai annals refer to him as Tok Sayyid and say that he came from India. However, neither of the two sources clearly states that these refer to the same person, the conclusion being drawn from the agreement in the date, the similarity in the sizes of the forces, and the parallel sequences of events in the two accounts. 'Tok Sayyid' might be an honorific or a title rather than a personal name.

The history of Patani written by Ibrahim Syukri does not include the Tok Sayyid incident, and his narrative refers only to the larger uprising led by Tengku Lamidin.
