= Kubang Pasu =

Kubang Pasu may refer to:

- Kingdom of Kubang Pasu Darul Qiyam, a historical Malay kingdom in the area
- Kubang Pasu District
- Kubang Pasu (federal constituency), represented in the Dewan Rakyat
- Kubang Pasu Barat (federal constituency), formerly represented in the Dewan Rakyat (1959–74)
- Kubang Pasu Barat (state constituency), formerly represented in the Kedah State Council (1955–59)
