= Chaophraya Nakhon (Noi) =

Siamese politician

Chao Phraya Nakhon Si Thammarat Noi Na Nagara
- เจ้าพระยานครศรีธรรมราช (น้อย ณ นคร)

Governor of Nakhon Si Thammarat
- In office 1811–1838
- Monarchs: Phutthaloetla Naphalai (Rama II); Nangklao (Rama III)
- Preceded by: Chaophraya Nakhon Phat
- Succeeded by: Chaophraya Nakhon Noiklang

Personal details
- Born: 27 August 1776 Nakhon Si Thammarat, Ayutthaya Kingdom
- Died: 14 May 1838 (aged 62) Nakhon Si Thammarat, Siam
- Spouse: Than Puying Im of Bangchang
- Parents: King Taksin (father); Consort Prang (mother)

Chao Phraya Nakhon Si Thammarat (Thai: เจ้าพระยานครศรีธรรมราช; RTGS: Chao Phraya Nakhon Si Thammarat), personal name Noi Na Nagara (Thai: น้อย ณ นคร; RTGS: Noi Na Nakhon; 27 August 1776 – 14 May 1838), was the governor of Nakhon Si Thammarat or Ligor from 1811 to 1838 and a son of King Taksin. He had important roles in the relations between Siam and the Sultanate of Kedah during the nineteenth century. His modern descendants bear the surname Na Nagara (Thai: ณ นคร), Komarakul Na Nagara (Thai: โกมารกุล ณ นคร) and Chaturangakula (Thai: จาตุรงตกุล). Chao Phraya Nakhon Noi was known in Malay sources as Phya Buri Sakmuton and in contemporary British sources as the Raja of Ligor.

== Biography ==
When King Taksin led an expedition to subjugate Nakhon Si Thammarat in 1769, he took a daughter of Chao Phraya Nakhon Nu, the warlord of Nakhon Si Thammarat after the Fall of Ayutthaya, named Prang as Chao Chom or one of his minor consorts. The wife of Uparaj Phat, who was the vice-governor of Nakhon Si Thammarat and Nakhon Nu's son-in-law, died in 1774. King Taksin expressed his will to give up his own Consort Prang to be Uparaj Phat's new wife. However, the court ladies told the king in 1776 that the menstruation of Consort Prang had ceased for two months and she might be pregnant with the king. King Taksin insisted that he himself should heed his own words and Uparaj Phat reluctantly accepted Consort Prang as his new ceremonial wife. Consort Prang bore a son at Nakhon Si Thammarat and Noi was born on 27 August 1776. Uparaj Phat became Noi's adoptive father. Uparaj Phat was appointed as Chaophraya Nakhon Phat the governor of Nakhon Si Thammarat or Ligor in 1784.

Nakhon Phat brought his adoptive son Noi to Bangkok to begin his career as a royal page of King Rama I. Noi was later made Phra Borrirak Phubet (Thai: พระบริรักษ์ภูเบศร์) and was allowed to return to Ligor. He served his adoptive father during the Burmese Invasion of Phuket in 1809. He led a fleet from Trang to recapture Phuket from the Burmese, though the Burmese had already abandoned Phuket earlier. His adoptive father Nakhon Phat resigned from the governorship of Ligor in 1811 and Noi was appointed Phraya Nakhon Si Thammarat the new governor of Ligor, though his adoptive father still wield authorities.

Also in 1811, Ahmad Tajuddin Halim Shah II of Kedah had conflicts with his brother Tunku Bisnu. Tunku Bisnu was then made the governor of Setul and approached Nakhon Noi. His adoptive father Nakhon Phat died in 1814. The governorship of Ligor also served as the base for Siamese control over Northern Malay States. In 1815, Sultan Muhammad I of Kelantan requested Nakhon Noi that Kelantan be separated from Terengganu and became direct vassal of Siam. King Rama II granted Kelantan as a separate vassal state to the authority of Ligor.

In 1820, King Bagyidaw of Burma planned a new invasion of Siam. Sultan Ahmad Tajuddin Halim Shah of Kedah, upon hearing the news of Burmese invasions, decided to secretly went into alliance with Burma. Tunku Mom, a brother of the sultan, informed Nakhon Noi about the sultan's secret alliance with Burma. King Rama II then summoned Sultan Ahmad Tajuddin Halim Shah to Bangkok but he did not go so he ordered the Siamese invasion of Kedah. Nakhon Noi brought troops to capture Alor Setar in 1821. The sultan then fled to Penang, which had been leased by Kedah to the British in 1786. Siam imposed a direct rule on Kedah. Nakhon Noi's son Phra Phakdi Borrirak was appointed as the governor of Kedah with the title of Phraya Aphaithibet.

The British at Penang was concerned with Siamese presence in Kedah as then the sultan was taking refuge in Penang. Marquess of Hastings, the Governor-General of India, sent John Crawfurd to Bangkok in 1821. When Crawfurd reached Penang in December 1821, Nakhon Noi "the Raja of Ligor" sent a letter to Crawfurd declaring that he and Siam had no intentions of invading Penang. However, Crawfurd was still convinced about the potential Siamese threat. When Crawfurd arrived at Bangkok in April 1822, he presented the personal letter of Sultan Ahmad Tajuddin Halim Shah to King Rama II blaming Nakhon Noi.

In October 1825, Henry Burney arrived at Ligor. Nakhon Noi led Burney to Bangkok and became one of three Siamese delegates that participated in the conclusion of Burney Treaty in June 1826 that recognized Siamese suzerainty over Northern Malay States.

In 1831, Tunku Kudin a nephew of Sultan Ahmad Tajuddin Halim Shah led forces to capture Alor Setar. Phraya Aphaithibet, Nakhon Noi's son, fled the city. Nakhon Noi ordered the forces to be levied from Pattani to fight Tunku Kudin in Kedah. Tuan Sulung the governor of Pattani also rebelled and joined Kedah with supports from Kelantan and Terengganu. The event rose to become the rebellion of Northern Malay Sultanates. Nakhon Noi led forces to recapture Alor Setar. Tunku Kudin was killed and his severed head was sent to Bangkok. King Rama III sent Chao Phraya Phraklang to aid Nakhon Noi. Nakhon Noi restored his son Phraya Aphaithibet as the governor of Kedah. Nakhon Noi then joined Phraklang to take Pattani. Tuan Sulung the governor of Pattani fled to Kelantan. Nakhon Noi and Phraklang pursued Tuan Sulung to Kelantan. Sultan Muhammad of Kelantan surrendered and voluntarily gave Tuan Sulung to the Siamese.

In 1837, Princess Mother Sri Sulalai, mother of King Rama III, died. While Nakhon Noi and most of the officials in Southern Siam were away in Bangkok to attend the funeral, another Kedah Rebellion occurred in February 1838. Two of the Sultan Ahmad Tajuddin's nephews, Tunku Muhammad Sa'ad and Tunku Muhammad Akib, had the Andaman pirates led by Wan Mali attack and capture Alor Setar again. Phraya Aphaithibet the Kedah governor fled to Phatthalung. Nakhon Noi who had been ill hurriedly returned to Ligor. King Rama III sent Phraya Sripipat (Phraklang's younger brother) to aid Nakhon Noi. His son Phraya Aphaithibet retook Alor Setar. Nakhon Noi then died on 14 May 1838 at Nakhon Si Thammarat.

After the demise of Nakhon Noi, Phraya Sripipat installed Tunku Anum as a new ruler of Kedah. Nakhon Noi's son Noiklang succeeded his father as the new governor of Ligor. Phraya Aphaithibet, the former governor of Kedah, was made governor of Phangnga instead.

== Family and Issues ==
Chaophraya Nakhon Noi had many wives, in accordance to social customs of the era. His main wife was Lady In, a daughter of Phraya Pinat-akkhi from Bangchang family. Nakhon Noi had total of thirty-four children. His notable children include;

- Noiyai (died 1905), born to Lady In, became Chao Chom Manda or minor consort to King Rama III. She bore a prince, Prince Chalermwongse, in 1825.
- Noilek, born to Lady In, became Chao Chom or minor consort to King Rama III.
- Noiyai (died 1860), born to Lady In, governor of Phatthalung from 1826 until 1838 when he was called to Bangkok. He was later made Chao Phraya Maha Siritham the governor of Ayutthaya in 1851. His descendants bear the surname Komarakul Na Nagara. Noiyai was a grandfather of Chaophraya Phollathep (Chalerm Komarakul na Nakhon), the Minister of Agriculture from 1920 to 1930.
- Noiklang (died 1867), born to Lady In, succeeded his father as Chaophraya Nakhon Si Thammarat the governor of Ligor. His descendants bear the surname Na Nagara. His son Nuphrom succeeded him as the governor of Ligor upon his death in 1867. Nuphrom was the father of Chaophraya Bodindechanuchit (Yaem na Nakhon).
- Saeng, born to Lady Chuai, became Phraya Aphaithibet the governor of Kedah from 1821 to 1838. Later became the governor of Phangnga from 1840 until his death in 1871.

Chaophraya Nakhon (Noi) House of Nagara Cadet branch of the House of Thonburi Born: 27 August 1776 Died: 14 May 1838
Political offices
Preceded by Phat	Governor of Nakhon Si Thammarat; 1811–1838	Succeeded by Noiklang
