= Kedah Royal Mausoleum =

Royal mausoleum in Kota Setar, Kedah, Malaysia

Coordinates: 6.1488°N 100.4307°E

Kedah
- Interactive map of Kedah

Details
- Established: 1778
- Location: Langgar, Kota Setar, Kedah, Malaysia
- Type: Royal Mausoleum
- Owned by: State Government of Kedah
- No. of graves: Unknown

Kedah Royal Mausoleum or Langgar Royal Mausoleum (Malay: Makam Diraja Langgar) is a royal burial ground in the Kedah state of Malaysia. It is located in Langgar, in Kota Setar District.

== List of graves ==
=== Sultan graves ===
- Sultan Abdullah Muadzam Shah ibni Almarhum Sultan Ataullah Muhammad Shah II (died 1706)
- Sultan Ahmad Tajuddin Halim Shah I ibni Almarhum Sultan Abdullah Mu'adzam Shah (died 1710)
- Sultan Zainal Adilin Mu'adzam Shah II ibni Almarhum Sultan Abdullah Mu'adzam Shah (died 1778)
- Sultan Abdullah Mukarram Shah ibni Almarhum Sultan Zainal Adilin Mu'adzam Shah II (died 1797)
- Sultan Ahmad Tajuddin Halim Shah II ibni Almarhum Sultan Abdullah Mukarram Shah (died 1843)
- Sultan Zainal Rashid Mu'adzam Shah I ibni Almarhum Sultan Ahmad Tajuddin Halim Shah II (died 1854)
- Sultan Ahmad Tajuddin Mukarram Shah ibni Almarhum Sultan Zainal Rashid Mu'adzam Shah I (died 1879)
- Sultan Zainal Rashid Mu'adzam Shah II ibni Almarhum Sultan Ahmad Tajuddin Mukarram Shah (died 1881)
- Sultan Abdul Hamid Halim Shah ibni Almarhum Sultan Ahmad Tajuddin Mukarram Shah (died 1943)
- Sultan Badlishah ibni Almarhum Sultan Abdul Hamid Halim Shah (died 1958)
- Sultan Abdul Halim Mu'adzam Shah ibni Almarhum Sultan Badlishah (died 2017)

=== Sultanah graves ===
- Paduka Seri Cik Manjalara binti Abdullah
- Tunku Sofiah binti Almarhum Tunku Mahmud
- Sultanah Asma binti Almarhum Sultan Sulaiman Badrul Alam Shah (died 1996)
- Sultanah Bahiyah binti Almarhum Tuanku Abdul Rahman (died 2003)

== Royal family graves ==
- 32.Tunku Ahmad Tajuddin Putra ibni Sultan Abdul Hamid Halim Shah (died 1951)
- 35.Tunku Kassim ibni Sultan Abdul Hamid Halim Shah – Tunku Laksamana of Kedah (died 1974)
- 38.Tunku Mohammad Jewa ibni Sultan Abdul Hamid Halim Shah – Tunku Temenggong of Kedah (died 1977)
  - 02.Tunku General Tan Sri Osman Khallidd Shah ibni Tunku Mohammad Jewa – First Malaysian Armed Forces Chief (died 1994)
  - 06.Tunku Ismail Khazzinn Shah ibni Tunku Mohammad Jewa – Universiti Sains Malaysia (USM) dean (died 2009)
- 40.Tunku Yaakob ibni Sultan Abdul Hamid Halim Shah – Tunku Panglima Besar of Kedah (died 1990)
- 44.Tunku Abdul Rahman Putra ibni Sultan Abdul Hamid Halim Shah – First Malaysian Prime Minister, also known as "Father of Malayan Independence" or "Father of Malaysia" (died 1990)
- Tunku Sarina binti Tengku Abdul Aziz (died 1991) – adopted daughter of Sultan Abdul Halim Mu'adzam Shah of Kedah
- Tun Sharifah Rodziah binti Syed Alwi Barakbah – Wife of the first Malaysian Prime Minister Tunku Abdul Rahman Putra and First Lady of Malaysia (died 2000)
- Tunku Annuar ibni Sultan Badlishah]] – Tunku Bendahara of Kedah and also Chairman of the Council of Regency of Kedah when his brother, Sultan Abdul Halim Mu'adzam Shah became 14th Yang di-Pertuan Agong (2011 - 2016) (died 2014)
- Tunku Raudzah binti Sultan Hishamuddin Alam Shah; Raja Puan Muda of Kedah and also consort of Tunku Abdul Malik, Raja Muda of Kedah (died 2015)
- Tunku Hamidah binti Sultan Badlishah – elder sister of Sultan Abdul Halim Mu'adzam Shah of Kedah (died 2015)
- Tunku Abdul Malik ibni Sultan Badlishah; Raja Muda of Kedah (died 2015)
- Tunku Sakinah binti Sultan Badlishah – younger sister of Sultan Abdul Halim Mu'adzam Shah of Kedah (died 2025)

== Non-royal family graves ==
- Wan Mat Saman – Former Menteri Besar of Kedah (died 1898)
- Tun Syed Sheh Shahabudin – 2nd Governor of Penang (died 1969)
- Tun Syed Sheh Barakbah – 2nd President of the Dewan Negara and 3rd Governor of Penang (died 1975)

== See also ==
- Sultan Abdul Samad Mausoleum, Bukit Jugra, Jugra, Kuala Langat, Selangor
- Shah Alam Royal Mausoleum, Shah Alam, Selangor
- Kelantan Royal Mausoleum, Kota Bharu, Kelantan
- Pahang Old Royal Mausoleum, Kampung Marhum, Kuala Pahang, Pekan, Pahang
- Al-Ghufran Royal Mausoleum, Kuala Kangsar, Perak
- Mahmoodiah Royal Mausoleum, Johor Bahru, Johor
- Seri Menanti Royal Mausoleum, Seri Menanti, Kuala Pilah, Negeri Sembilan
