= Kingdom of Kubang Pasu Darul Qiyam =

Malay kingdom (1839–1864)

Kingdom of Kubang Pasu Darul Qiyam کرجاءن کوبڠ ڤاسو دار القيام (Malay) Kerajaan Kubang Pasu Darul Qiyam (Malay)
- 1839–1859
- Flag

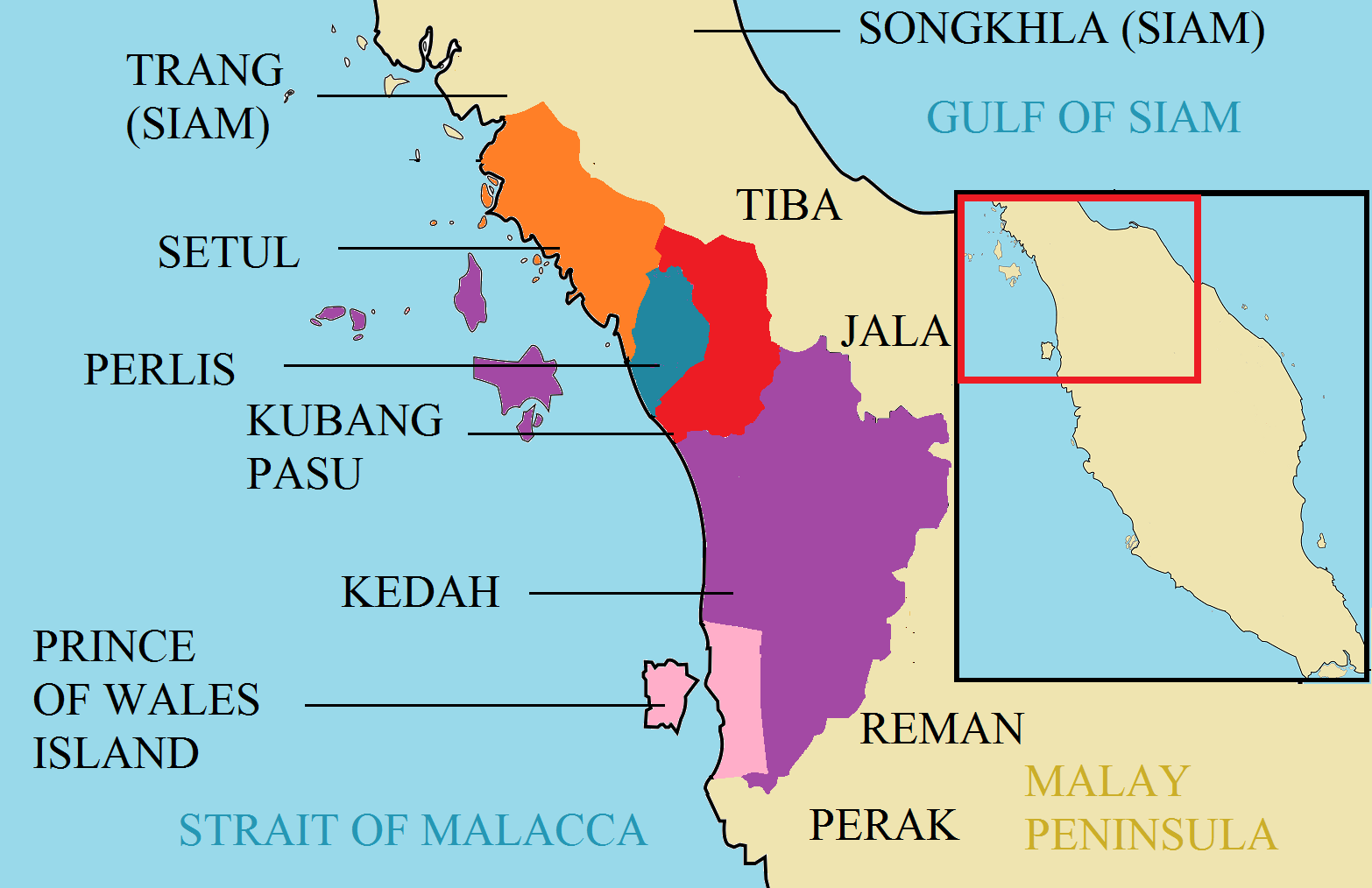
- The four Kedahan dominions by 1860 in colour, after the loss of Terang (Trang) to Siam in 1810, the secession of Prince of Wales Island and Province Wellesley to the British between 1786 and 1860 and the Kedah Partition of 1843 that witnessed the birth of four separate dominions. The four kingdoms are in their respective colours, while other neighbouring polities are in light brown.
- Status: Client state of Siam
- Capital: Kampung Pulau Pisang (6°16′12.3″N 100°22′53.4″E)
- Common languages: Malay, Kedah Malay
- Religion: Sunni Islam
- Government: Monarchy
- Raja
  - 1839–1853: H.H. Tunku Anum bin Tunku ‘Abdu’l Rahman
  - 1853–1859: H.H. Tunku Haji Ishak bin Tunku Muhammad
- History
  - The foundation of Kubang Pasu: 1839
  - Unification with Kedah: 1859
| Preceded by | Succeeded by |
| Kedah Kingdom | Kedah Kingdom |
- Today part of: Thailand; Malaysia

Kubang Pasu, officially known as the Kingdom of Kubang Pasu Darul Qiyam (Malay: کرجاءن کوبڠ ڤاسو دار القيام, romanized: Kerajaan Kubang Pasu Darul Qiyam; Thai: เมืองกุปังปาสู; RTGS: Mueang Kupangpasu) was a Malay kingdom located in the northern Malay Peninsula. The state was established in 1839 as a gift to Tunku Anum of the Kedahan nobility, for his efforts in ending the conflict between Kedah and Siam in the aftermath of the Siamese invasion in 1821. The kingdom had two monarchs before it was re-integrated into Kedah in 1859.

== History ==
=== Origin ===
The Siamese Rattanakosin Kingdom successfully invaded Kedah in 1821 with the Sultan of Kedah, Ahmad Tajuddin Halim Shah II exiled to Penang and later Malacca. From Malacca, he planned several failed rebellions to recapture Kedah between 1828 and 1831, and between 1838 and 1839.

It was during this time that Tunku Anum rose to prominence in Kedah. He was a member of the political elite in the Kedah royal house and was a son of Tunku Abdul Rahman, the governor of Chenak district (today Sadao). He was previously appointed as the plenipotentiary during a bunga mas tribute to Siam in August 1809, after which he was awarded the honorific title of Tengku Paduka Raja Jambangan.

During the Siamese occupation of Kedah, he gained influence by maintaining a relationship with Phya Sina Nunchit, the Siamese governor of Kedah, himself the son of the governor of Ligor Province (now Nakhon Si Thammarat province). His political ambitions were largely motivated by his desire to liberate Kedah from Siamese occupation.

=== Liberation of Kedah ===
While gaining the confidence of the Siamese governor, Tunku Anum began to recruit local Malay militiamen in Gua Kerbau, Bukit Keplu (6°23′23.5″N 100°18′55.1″E, located near present-day Kodiang). The regiment was trained to fight the occupying Siamese army.

While Tunku Anum was on a visit to Ligor, Malay militiamen launched an offensive against the Siamese troops in Alor Ganu, near Anak Bukit. Desperate, the Siamese governor Nunchit wrote to his father, the Governor of Ligor, to request assistance to put down the rebellion. While the Governor of Ligor mobilised, he also offered Tunku Anum to be his representative in Kedah, hoping that his expertise would be able to end the rebellion.

Tunku Anum refused the position, believing that if he accepted, Kedah would forever remain a Siamese province and he would be reduced to being a Siamese puppet. With the conflict worsening in Kedah, the Siamese soon withdrew due to soaring costs and disease among the occupying troops. The conflict ended with Kedah regaining its autonomy in 1842, with the condition Kedah pay a tribute in the form of bunga mas and bunga perak to Bangkok every three years.

=== The King of Kubang Pasu ===
Upon the return of Sultan Ahmad Tajuddin from his exile in Malacca, he rewarded Tunku Anum with 24 districts from Jitra to Sendawa, which became the kingdom of Kubang Pasu. Pulau Pisang (6°16′12.3″N 100°22′53.4″E) near Jitra was made the capital of the new kingdom. He ascended the throne in 1839 and bestowed the honorific title of Darul Qiyam "the sovereign state" to the kingdom.

Kubang Pasu prospered during his rule; several development projects were implemented, including a court, a fort, a prison, religious schools and land office. The area also became a centre of trading and rice growing. He also ordered the construction of local factories to develop the textile industry (now known as Pulau Kain) and also improved the irrigation system of the local river, presently known as Sungai Tunku Anum (Tunku Anum River). Land titles made during this era also bore the seal of Kubang Pasu.

=== Reintegration into Kedah ===
Tunku Anum reigned over the kingdom for 17 years until his death on 29 May 1853 in the Istana Kota Pulau Pisang. His death was widely speculated to be caused by shock resulting from the death of his son in 1848. He was buried at Makam Tunku Anum (6°16′2.8″N 100°22′52″E). A narration of his life was written near his tomb.

On 31 May 1853, Tunku Ishak, his grandson, was proclaimed as the new king; while another grandson Tunku Muhammad Saman was appointed as the raja muda (crown prince). Tunku Ishak was remembered as a rather unpopular monarch among his subjects and ministers due to several policies that he had promulgated. Kubang Pasu was eventually reintegrated into Kedah in 1859, and remains as a district and constituency of the state.

== Rulers ==
| The Raja (King) of Kubang Pasu | In office |
|---|---|
| H.H. Tunku Anum bin Tunku ‘Abdu’l Rahman | 1839–1853 |
| H.H. Tunku Haji Ishak bin Tunku Muhammad | 1853–1859 |

== Gallery ==
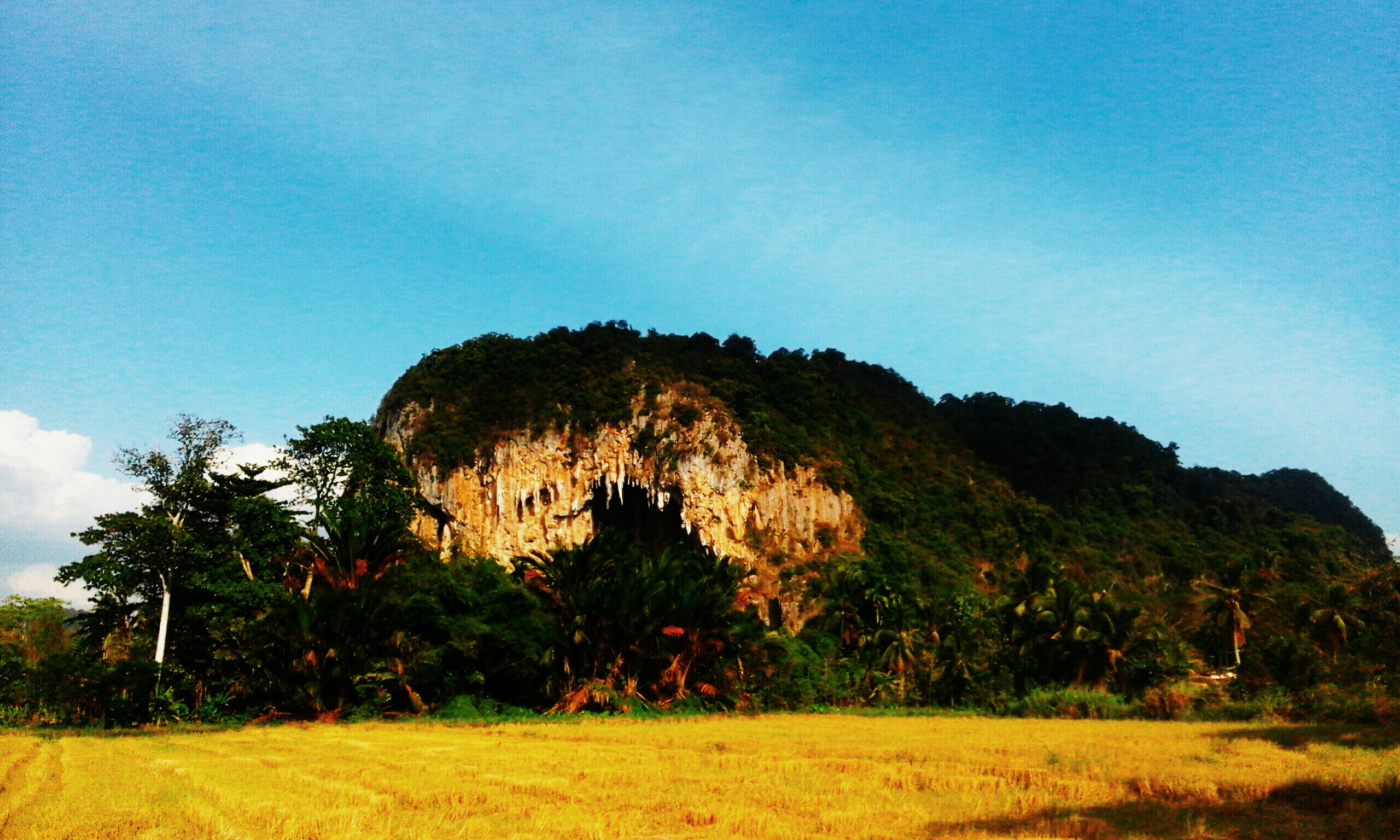
Gua Kerbau, the historic training camp for the Kedahan militia during the Siamese occupation of Kedah.

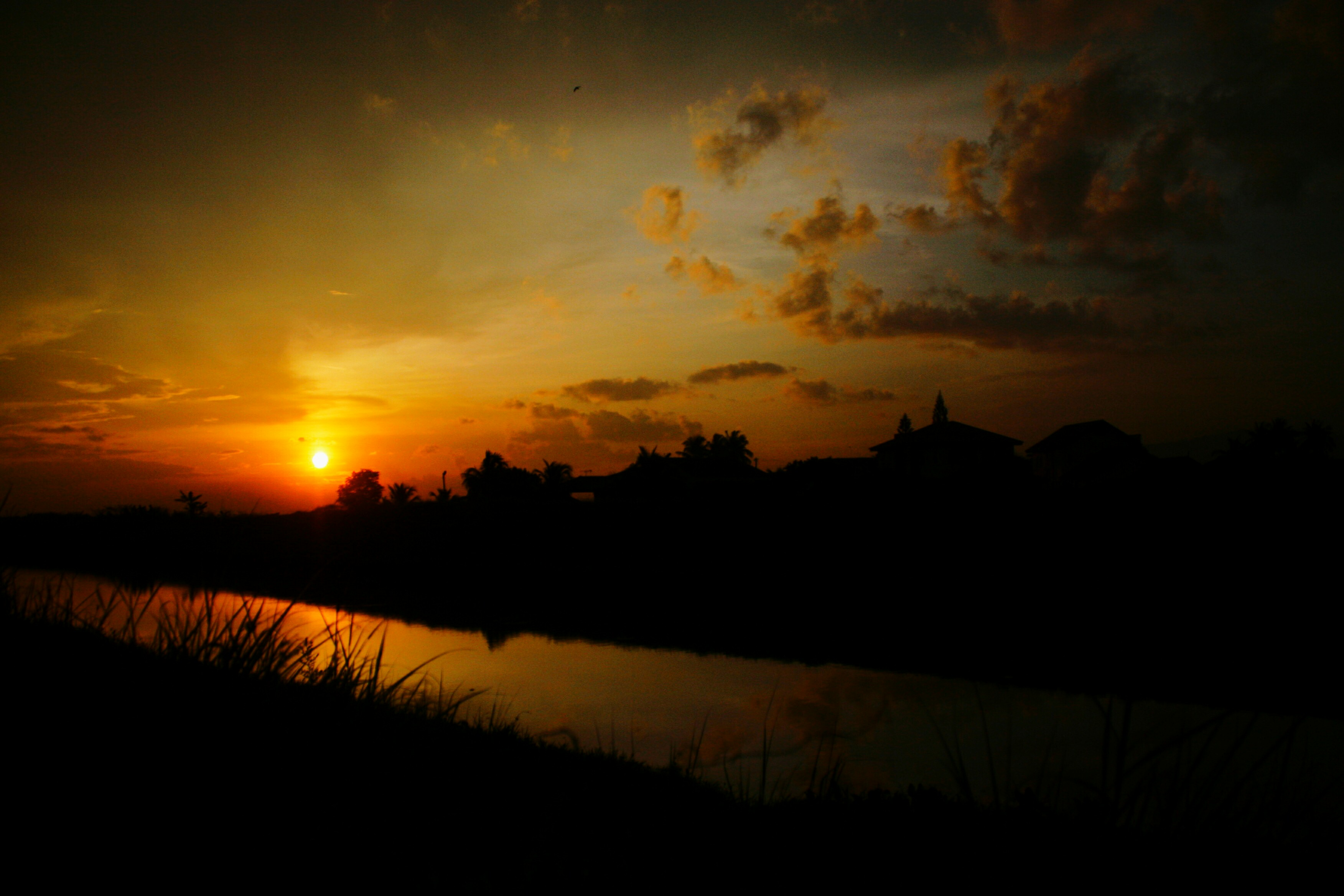
Sungai Tunku Anum in Kubang Pasu. The river was named in honour of the late king for his efforts on developing the territory, including improving the irrigation system of the river.

== See also ==
- Kingdom of Setul Mambang Segara, another historical Malay Kingdom born during the Partition of Kedah.
- List of Sunni dynasties

== Bibliography ==
- Andaya, Barbara Watson (1982). A History of Malaysia. New York: St. Martin's Press. ISBN 978-0-312-38120-2.
- DoAsia (2017), พัฒนาการทางประวัติศาสตร์
- Hasfiza (2011), Tengku Anom Raja Kubang Pasu di Negeri Kedah Mangkat, BHplus, archived from the original on 9 November 2017
- Izham Nayan (2014), Tunku Anom Berkorban Demi Kedah, Izhamnayan
- John, Elizabeth (2009), Tunku Anom a freedom fighter, War Story
- Memori Kedah (2017), Makam Tunku Anum Paduka Raja Jambangan Di Kampung Raja Pulau Pisang, Perbandanan Perpustakaan Awam Kedah
- Pen Biru (2016), Makam Tunku Anom, Pen Biru
- Putera Mu'iz (2013), Tunku Anum, Raja Kubang Pasu Darul Qiyam, Syabab
- Suzalina Halid (2015), Sultan Kubang Pasu, BHplus
