= Abdul Hamid Halim of Kedah =

Sultan of Kedah (r. 1881–1943)

Abdul Hamid Halim Shah عبد الحميد حليم شاه
- Sultan of Kedah
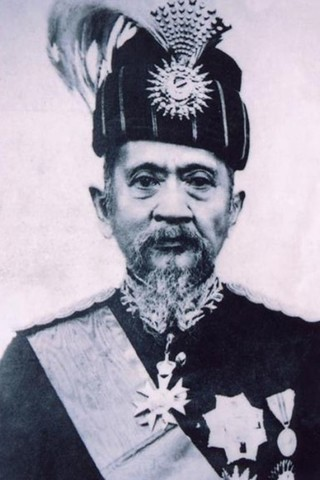
- Abdul Hamid Halim of Kedah

Sultan of Kedah
- Reign: 22 September 1881 – 13 May 1943
- Predecessor: Zainal Rashid Mu'adzam Shah II
- Successor: Badlishah
- Born: 4 June 1864; Alor Setar, Syburi, Siam (now Alor Setar, Kedah, Malaysia)
- Died: 13 May 1943 (aged 78); Alor Setar, Kedah
- Burial: Langgar Royal Mausoleum
- Spouse: List: Cik Menyelara; Che Sofiah; Sharifah Fatimah binti Syed Idrus; Sharifah Seha binti Syed Hussein; Che Spachendra; Sharifah Mariam; Che Laraseh
- Issue: List: Badlishah; Tunku Abdul Rahman; Tuanku Abdul Malik; Tunku Yusuf; Tunku Mansur; Tunku Kasim; Tunku Yahya; Tunku Abdul Majid; Tunku Zainal Abidin Thani
Names
- Abdul Hamid Halim Shah ibni Almarhum Sultan Ahmad Tajuddin Mukarram Shah
- House: Mahawangsa
- Father: Ahmad Tajuddin Mukarram Shah
- Mother: Wan Hajar binti Wan Ismail
- Religion: Sunni Islam

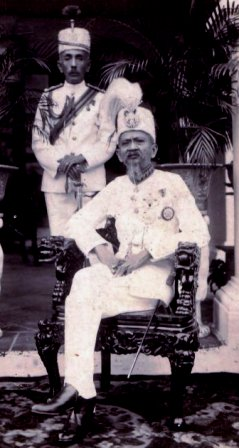
Abdul Hamid Halim Sultan of Kedah

Abdul Hamid Halim Shah ibni Almarhum Sultan Ahmad Tajuddin Mukarram Shah KCMG (Jawi: ڤدوك سري سلطان سر عبد الحميد حليم شاه ابن المرحوم سلطان أحمد تاج الدين مكرم شاه; 4 June 1864 – 13 May 1943) or Chao Phraya Ritthisongkhram Ramphakdi Si Sunlatan (Hamid) (Thai: เจ้าพระยาฤทธิสงครามรามภักดีศรีสุลต่าน (ฮามิด)) was the 26th sultan of Kedah and reigned from 1881 to 1943. He incorporated many Western elements into government, telegraph systems, land administration, a modern treasury and also a major canal, impressing many Western observers including Swettenham who called his kingdom 'exceptionally well-governed'. However, it was also during his reign that five extravagant weddings in 1904 caused state bankruptcy, debt quadrupled over revenue amounts, and a large foreign loan was required to finance the debt.

== Foreign relations ==
During his reign, the Sultan had asked for a $2,500,000 loan from Siam during a state financial crisis in 1905. The loan was extended with the condition that a Financial Advisor from the court of Siam be accepted and a state council be created to assist the Sultan in the administration of all public affairs. This resulted in the promulgation of a new constitution on 29 July 1905. The state council was run by his brothers followed by their sons. The formation of the state council thus curbed the Sultan's administrative powers.

His reign marked the transition from Siamese suzerainty over Kedah to being a British Protectorate as an Unfederated Malay States following the Anglo-Siamese Treaty of 1909.

== Personal life ==
He was the son of Sultan Ahmad Tajuddin Mukarram Shah and Wan Hajar.

The Sultan had several wives and partners; Che Manjelara, Che Sofiah, Sharifah Fatimah Binti Syed Idrus, Sharifah Seha Binti Syed Hussein, Che Spachendra, Sharifah Mariam and Che Laraseh. The Sultan's seventh son and twentieth child with Makche Manjelara, Tunku Abdul Rahman, who would later become the first Prime Minister of Malaysia. The Sultan was succeeded by another son, Sultan Badlishah in 1943.

== Family ==
- Children with Che Puan Spachendra or Thiap Netrangsi (เทียบ เนตรรังษี; died 1907)
  - Tunku Ibrahim
  - Tunku Zam Zam
  - Tunku Rokiah
  - Tunku Fatimah
  - Tunku Kassim
- Children with Che Laraseh binti Lebai Ishak (died 1946)
  - Tunku Mansor
  - Tunku Sofiah
  - Tunku Johara
  - Tunku Noor
  - Tunku Zaleha
  - Tunku Abdul Jalil
  - Tunku Mohamad Akil
- Children with Sharifah Mariam binti Syed Mohamad Al-Idrus
  - Tunku Ahmad Tajuddin
  - Tunku Abdullah
  - Tunku Zainal Rashid Thani
  - Tunku Zainal Abidin
- Children with Sharifah Seha binti Syed Hussein (died 1922)
  - Tunku Abdullah Thani
  - Tunku Pengeran
  - Tunku Balkis
  - Tunku Zahara
- Children with Tunku Nai Sofiah binti Almarhum Tunku Nai Haji Hassan (died 1948)
  - Tunku Mohamad
  - Tunku Badlishah
  - Tunku Hindon
- Children with Paduka Seri Che Menjalara or Nueang Nandanagara (เนื่อง นนทนาคร; died 1941)
  - Tunku Yusof (CM of Kedah)
  - Tunku Aminah
  - Tunku Zabedah Manjalara
  - Tunku Abdul Rahman (CM of Malaya/PM Malaysia)
  - Tunku Baharum
  - Tunku Dakiah Manjalara
  - Tunku Habsah
  - Tunku Jaafar Shah
  - Tunku Jahara
  - Tunku Kalsom
  - Tunku Muhammad Jewa (Tunku Temenggung)
  - Tunku Mohamad Saad
- Children with Sharifah Fatimah binti Syed Idrus (died 1931)
  - Tunku Ya'acob
  - Tunku Hajar
  - Tunku Yahaya
  - Tunku Abdul Majid
  - Tunku Zainal Abidin Thani
  - Tunku Shuib
  - Tunku Shah Faris

== Title from the Siamese court ==
- 1879: Phra Seni Narongrit, Raja Muda of Syburi
  (Thai: พระเสนีณรงคฤทธิ์ รายามุดาเมืองไทรบุรี)
- 1882: Phraya Ritthisongkhram Ramphakdi Si Sunlatan Mahamat Rattana Ratchamunin Surinwiwangsa Phraya Syburi
  (Thai: พระยาฤทธิสงครามรามภักดี ศรีสุลต่าน มหะมัดรัตนราชมุนินทร์ สุรินทรวิวังษา พระยาไทรบุรี)
- 1895: Chao Phraya Ritthisongkhram Ramphakdi Si Sunlatan Mahamat Rattana Ratchamunin Surinwiwongphadung Thanubamrung Kedanakhon Amonrattanakhet Prathetsarat Rachaisawariyathibodi Wikrommasingha Chao Phraya Syburi
  (Thai: เจ้าพระยาฤทธิสงครามรามภักดีศรีสุลต่าน มหมัดรัตนราชมุนินทร สุรินทรวิวงษ์ผดุง ทนุบำรุงเกดะนคร อมรรัตนาณาเขตร ประเทศราชราไชสวริยาธิบดี วิกรมสีหะ เจ้าพระยาไทรบุรี)

== Honours ==
=== Foreign honours ===
- Thailand
  - Member of the Order of the Crown of Siam (1876)
  - Knight Grand Cross of the Order of the Crown of Siam (1890)
  - Dushdi Mala Medal (Rajkarn Pandin) (1893)
  - Knight Grand Cross of the Order of the White Elephant of Siam (1895)
  - Knight Grand Cross of the Order of Chula Chom Klao of Siam (1895)
  - Knight Grand Cordon of the Order of Chula Chom Klao of Siam (1908)
- United Kingdom
  - Honorary Knight Commander of the Order of St Michael and St George (KCMG) – Sir (1911)
  - King George VI Coronation Medal (1937)

Abdul Hamid Halim of Kedah House of Kedah Born: 4 June 1864 Died: 13 May 1943
Regnal titles
Preceded by Zainal Rashid Mu'adzam Shah II	Sultan of Kedah; 1881–1943	Succeeded by Badlishah
