= Ahmad Tajuddin Mukarram Shah of Kedah =

Sultan of Kedah (r. 1854–1879)

Ahmad Tajuddin أحمد تاج الدين
- Sultan of Kedah

Sultan of Kedah
- Reign: 1854–1879
- Predecessor: Zainal Rashid Al-Mu'adzam Shah I
- Successor: Zainal Rashid Mu'adzam Shah II
- Born: 1832
- Died: 22 June 1879 (aged 46/47)
- Burial: Langgar Royal Mausoleum
- Issue: Zainal Rashid Mu'adzam Shah II; Abdul Hamid Halim Shah
- House: Mahawangsa
- Father: Zainal Rashid Al-Mu'adzam Shah I
- Mother: Wan Maheran binti Wan Muhammad Sadiq
- Religion: Sunni Islam

Paduka Sri Sultan Ahmad Tajuddin Mukarram Shah ibni Almarhum Sultan Zainal Rashid Al-Mu'adzam Shah I (Jawi: ڤدوك سري سلطان أحمد تاج الدين مكرم شاه ابن المرحوم سلطان زين الراشد المعظم شاه ١; 1832 – 22 June 1879) was the 24th sultan of Kedah and reigned from 1854 to 1879. During his rule that the new Balai Nobat consisting of a five-story building was built. The building was built of wood with zinc roofing.

== Family ==
- Children with Wan Hajar binti Wan Ismail (died 1909)
  - Tunku Aminah
  - Tunku Rokiah
  - Tunku Abdul Hamid
  - Tunku Hafsah
  - Tunku Abdul Aziz
  - Tunku Asiah
  - Tunku Jiwa
  - Tunku Mahmud
- Children with Wan Tan binti Luang Nik Abidin (died 1907)
  - Tunku Zainal Rashid
  - Tunku Fatimah
  - Tunku Jahara
  - Tunku Abdul Jalil
  - Tunku Azhari
  - Tunku Zainal Abidin
  - Tunku Marodziah
  - Tunku Kassim

Ahmad Tajuddin Mukarram Shah of Kedah House of Kedah Born: 1852 Died: 22 June 1879
Regnal titles
Preceded by Zainal Rashid Al-Mu'adzam Shah I	Sultan of Kedah; 1854–1879	Succeeded by Zainal Rashid Mu'adzam Shah II
