= Badlishah of Kedah =

Sultan of Kedah (r. 1943–1958)

Badlishah بدلي شاه
- Sultan of Kedah
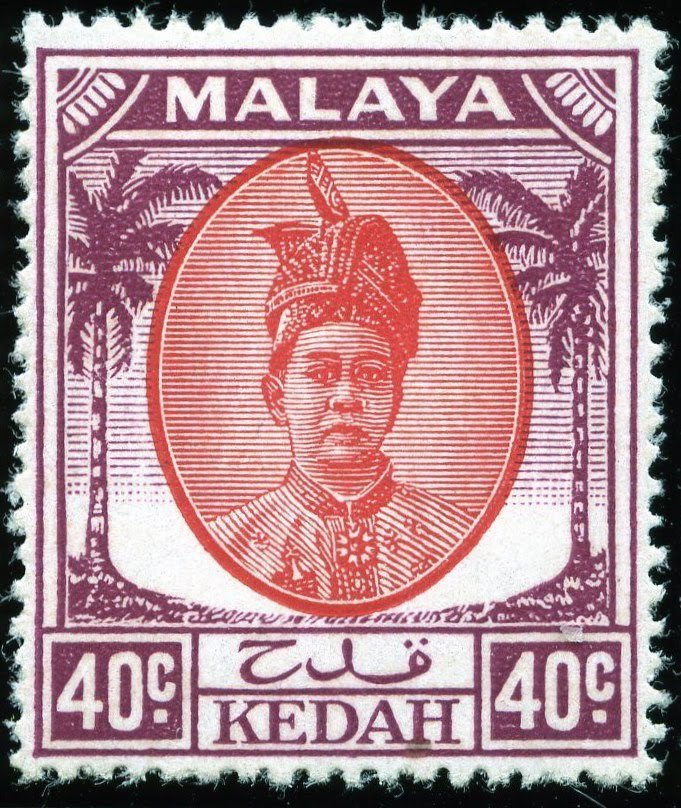
- Portrait on a 1950 issue stamp

Sultan of Kedah
- Reign: 13 May 1943 – 13 July 1958
- Predecessor: Abdul Hamid Halim Shah
- Successor: Abdul Halim Mu'adzam Shah
- Born: 17 March 1894; Alor Setar, Kedah, Siam
- Died: 13 July 1958 (aged 64); Alor Setar, Kedah, Federation of Malaya
- Burial: Langgar Royal Mausoleum
- Spouse: Tunku Sofia binti Almarhum Tunku Mahmud (1899–1934, m.1922–1934, her death); Sultanah Asma binti Almarhum Sultan Sulaiman Badrul Alam Shah (1911–1994, m.1934–1958, his death)
- Issue: Tunku Abdul Hamid; Sultan Abdul Halim Mu'adzam Shah; Tunku Abdul Malik; Tunku Mansur; Tunku Annuar; Sultan Sallehuddin; Tunku Abdul Hamid Thani; Tunku Hamidah; Tunku Sakinah; Tunku Hosnah; Tunku Bisharah; Tunku Badriatul Jamal; Tunku Kamaliah; Tunku Nafisah
- House: Mahawangsa
- Father: Abdul Hamid Halim Shah
- Mother: Tunku Nai Sofiah binti Almarhum Tunku Nai Haji Hassan
- Religion: Sunni Islam

Sultan Sir Badlishah ibni Almarhum Sultan Abdul Hamid Halim Shah KCMG KBE (Jawi: سلطان سر بدلي شاه ابن المرحوم سلطان عبد الحميد حليم شاه; 17 March 1894 – 13 July 1958) was the 27th Sultan of Kedah and reigned from 1943 to 1958. He ascended to the throne upon the death of his father, Sultan Abdul Hamid Halim. He was the elder half brother of the first Prime Minister of Malaysia, Tunku Abdul Rahman.

Sultan Badlishah also served as regent of Kedah between 1937 and 1943. In 1943, he was deposed by the Imperial Japanese Army, but was reinstated in 1945 following their surrender and the end of the Japanese occupation of Malaya.

== Family ==
Sultan Badlishah was married twice. His first marriage was to Tunku Sofiah binti Almarhum Tunku Mahmud (born 1899) in 1922. The marriage produced an heir, Sultan Abdul Halim who was the fifth King of Malaysia and the 28th Sultan of Kedah. Tunku Sofiah died in 1934 in an automobile accident.

- Tunku Abdul Hamid (born 20 August 1923, died young)
- Tunku Hamidah (22 September 1925 – 4 November 2015), married to Tengku Abdul Aziz Ibni Almarhum Sultan Sulaiman Badrul Alam Shah of Terengganu
- Tuanku Abdul Halim (28 November 1927 – 11 September 2017), Sultan of Kedah from 1958 to 2017 and twice Yang di-Pertuan Agong from 1970 to 1975 and from 2011 to 2016
- Tunku Abdul Malik (24 September 1929 – 29 November 2015), Raja Muda from 1960 to 2015
- Tunku Sakinah (11 November 1930 – 16 August 2025), married (div.) to Yves Borotra, son of the French tennis champion cum businessman, Jean Borotra.
- Tunku Mansur (29 December 1933 – 18 August 1934)

Sultan Badlishah's second marriage in 1934 was to Tengku Asma binti Almarhum Sultan Badrul Alam Shah (1911–1994), a Terengganu princess of the Bendahara dynasty. She served as Sultanah of Kedah and gave birth to a number of children:

- Tunku Hosna (born 25 January 1935)
- Tunku Annuar (30 June 1937 – 23 May 2014)
- Tuanku Sallehuddin (born 30 April 1942), Sultan of Kedah from September 2017 onwards, Raja Muda from 2015 to 2017
- Tunku Bisharah (born 18 October 1944)
- Tunku Kamaliah (born 6 June 1947)
- Tunku Badriatul Jamal (born 1 September 1949)
- Tunku Abdul Hamid Thani (born 18 June 1952)
- Tunku Nafisah (born 20 June 1954)

== Death and succession ==
Sultan Badlishah died on 13 July 1958 and was succeeded by his son, Sultan Abdul Halim.

== Honours ==
=== Honours of Kedah ===
- Founding Grand Master of the State of Kedah Star of Valour (BKK) (30 October 1952 – 13 July 1958)
- Founding Grand Master of the Kedah Supreme Order of Merit (KOM) (30 October 1952 – 13 July 1958)
- Founding Grand Master of the State of Kedah Star of Gallantry (BPK) (30 October 1952 – 13 July 1958)

=== Foreign Honours ===
- Thailand
  - Companion of the Order of the Crown of Thailand
  - Companion of the Order of the White Elephant
- United Kingdom
  - Recipient of the King George V Silver Jubilee Medal (1935)
  - Companion of the Order of St Michael and St George (CMG) (1936)
  - Recipient of the King George VI Coronation Medal (1937)
  - Knight Commander of the Order of the British Empire (KBE) - Sir (1941)
  - Knight Commander of the Order of St Michael and St George (KCMG) - Sir (1948)
  - Recipient of the Queen Elizabeth II Coronation Medal (1953)

Badlishah of Kedah House of Kedah Born: 17 March 1894 Died: 13 July 1958
Regnal titles
Preceded by Abdul Hamid Halim Shah	Sultan of Kedah; 1943–1958	Succeeded by Abdul Halim Mu'adzam Shah
