= Dziaddin Mukarram Shah II of Kedah =

Sultan of Kedah (r. 1797–1803)

Dziaddin II ضياء الدين ٢
- Sultan of Kedah
- Reign: 1 September 1797 – September 1803
- Predecessor: Abdullah Mukarram Shah
- Successor: Ahmad Tajuddin Halim Shah II
- Died: 25 January 1815; Kota Indera Kayangan
- Burial: Kota Indera Kayangan Royal Cemetery
- Spouse: Wan Tam
- Issue: Tunku Hakim Ibrahim; Tunku Yusuf; Tunku Muhammad; Tunku Safia
Posthumous name
- Al-Marhum Kayang al-Thani
- House: Mahawangsa
- Father: Muhammad Jiwa Zainal Adilin Mu'adzam Shah II
- Mother: Tunku Putri
- Religion: Sunni Islam

Paduka Sri Sultan Dziaddin Mukarram Shah II ibni al-Marhum Sultan Muhammad Jiwa Zainal Adilin Mu'adzam Shah II (Jawi: ڤدوك سري سلطان ضياء الدين مكرم شاه ٢ ابن المرحوم سلطان محمد جيوا زين العابدين معظم شاه ٢; died 25 January 1815; also spelt Sultan Ziyauddin Mukarram Shah II or Sultan Dhiauddin Mukarram Shah II) was the 21st Sultan of Kedah and reigned from 1797 to 1803. He was appointed as the second heir to his brother Abdullah Mukarram Shah and invested with the title of Raja Muda on 6 April 1760.

In 1770 he was appointed as heir presumptive and invested with the title of Sultan and Yang di-Pertuan Muda of Perlis and Kedah, with the style of Duli Yang Maha Mulia, and granted Perlis, Kubang Pasu, Setul and Langu as his fief.

He became the Sultan of Kedah on the death of his elder half-brother on 1 September 1797. He ceded Seberang Perai (Province Wellesley) to the East India Company (EIC) on 7 July 1800 in return for an annual stipend. He concluded a treaty of friendship and alliance with the EIC on 6 June 1800.

He was eventually forced by the King of Siam to abdicate in favour of his nephew and was made ruler of the province of Perlis (Kayangan) with the title of Raja Muda Kayang in September 1803.

Dziaddin Mukarram Shah II of Kedah House of Kedah Died: 25 January 1815
Regnal titles
Preceded by Abdullah Mukarram Shah	Sultan of Kedah; 1797–1803	Succeeded by Ahmad Tajuddin Halim Shah II
