= Zainal Rashid Al-Mu'adzam Shah I of Kedah =

Sultan of Kedah (r. 1845–1854)

Zainal Rashid I زين الراشد ١
- Sultan of Kedah

Sultan of Kedah
- Reign: 1845–1854
- Predecessor: Ahmad Tajuddin Halim Shah II
- Successor: Ahmad Tajuddin Mukarram Shah
- Born: 1803; Kedah
- Died: 13 March 1854 (aged 51); Kedah
- Burial: Langgar Royal Mausoleum
- Spouse: Wan Maheran/Wan Masheran binti Wan Mohd Sidek
- Issue: Ahmad Tajuddin Mukarram Shah
Posthumous name
- Al-Marhum Kota Star III
- House: Mahawangsa
- Father: Ahmad Tajuddin Halim Shah II
- Mother: Che Arshid
- Religion: Sunni Islam

Paduka Sri Sultan Zainal Rashid Al-Mu'adzam Shah I ibni Almarhum Sultan Ahmad Tajuddin Halim Shah II (Jawi: ڤدوك سري سلطان زين الراشد المعظم شاه ١ ابن المرحوم سلطان أحمد تاج الدين حليم شاه ٢; 1803 – 13 March 1854) was the 23rd Sultan of Kedah and reigned from 1845 to 1854.

== Family ==
- Children with Wan Maheran/Wan Masheran binti Wan Mohd Sidek
  - Tunku Ahmad Tajuddin
  - Tunku Puteri
  - Tunku Yaakob
  - Tunku Yusof
  - Tunku Rahimah
  - Tunku Sofiah
  - Tunku Zam Zam
  - Tunku Aisha
  - Tunku Ziauddin
  - Tunku Jahara

Zainal Rashid Al-Mu'adzam Shah I of Kedah House of Kedah Born: 1803 Died: 13 March 1854
Regnal titles
Preceded by Ahmad Tajuddin Halim Shah II	Sultan of Kedah; 1845–1854	Succeeded by Ahmad Tajuddin Mukarram Shah
