= Zainal Rashid Mu'adzam Shah II of Kedah =

Sultan of Kedah (r. 1879–1881)

Zainal Rashid II زين الراشد ٢
- Sultan of Kedah

Sultan of Kedah
- Reign: 22 June 1879 - 22 September 1881
- Predecessor: Ahmad Tajuddin Mukarram Shah
- Successor: Abdul Hamid Halim Shah
- Born: 4 September 1857
- Died: 22 September 1881 (aged 24); Ligor, Nakhon Si Thammarat, Siam
- Burial: Nakhon Si Thammarat
- Spouse: Tunku Mariam binti Almarhum Tunku Dhiauddin
- Issue: Tunku Aishah
- House: Mahawangsa
- Father: Ahmad Tajuddin Mukarram Shah
- Mother: Wan Tan binti Luang Nik Abidin
- Religion: Sunni Islam

Paduka Sri Sultan Zainal Rashid Mu'adzam Shah II ibni Almarhum Sultan Ahmad Tajuddin Mukarram Shah (Jawi: ڤدوك سري سلطان زين الراشد معظم شاه ٢ ابن المرحوم سلطان أحمد تاج الدين مكرم شاه; 4 September 1857 – 22 September 1881) was the 25th Sultan of Kedah and reigned from 1879 to 1881. He was the son of Sultan Ahmad Tajuddin Mukarram Shah with Wan Tan binti Almarhum Luang Nik Abidin. He married Tengku Mariam binti Almarhum Tengku Ziauddin and had a daughter, Tengku Aishah.

Tengku Aishah married the Sultan of Langkat, Sultan Abdul Aziz Abdul Djalil Rahmat Shah.

He was poisoned and died during detention in Ligor, Nakhon Si Thammarat on 22 September 1881 and was succeeded by his half-brother as, Sultan Abdul Hamid Halim.

Zainal Rashid Mu'adzam Shah II of Kedah House of Kedah Born: 4 September 1857 Died: 22 September 1881
Regnal titles
Preceded by Ahmad Tajuddin Mukarram Shah	Sultan of Kedah; 1879–1881	Succeeded by Abdul Hamid Halim Shah
