= Abdullah Mukarram Shah of Kedah =

Sultan of Kedah (r. 1778–1797)

Abdullah Mukarram Shah عبد الله مكرم شاه
- Sultan and Yang di-Pertuan of the State of Kedah Dar ul-Aman

Sultan of Kedah
- Reign: 1778–1797
- Predecessor: Muhammad Jiwa Zainal Adilin Mu'adzam Shah II
- Successor: Dziaddin Mukarram Shah II
- Died: 1 September 1797; Istana Baginda, Alor Star
- Burial: Langgar Royal Mausoleum
- Spouse: Tengku Puneh; Wan Mek; Wan Kamaliah; Che’ Puan Paduka Bonda; Che Fatima Dewi; Che’ Chandra Sari; Che’ Bida Sari
- Issue: Ten sons and eleven daughters, including: Tunku Yahya; Sultan Ahmad Tajuddin Halim Shah II; Tunku Bisnu; Tunku Ibrahim; Tunku Sulaiman; Tunku Kusu; Tunku Daud; Tunku Ya’akub; Tunku Ahmad; Tunku Muhammad Yusuf; Tunku Hitam; Tunku Chik; Tunku Zamzam
Posthumous name
- Al-Marhum Kota Star al-Thani
- House: Mahawangsa
- Father: Muhammad Jiwa Zainal Adilin Mu'adzam Shah II
- Religion: Sunni Islam

Paduka Sri Sultan Abdullah Mukarram Shah ibni al-Marhum Sultan Muhammad Jiwa Zainal Adilin Mu'adzam Shah II (Jawi: ڤدوك سري سلطان عبد الله مكرم شاه ابن المرحوم سلطان محمد جيوا زين العابدين معظم شاه ٢; died 1 September 1797) was the 20th Sultan of Kedah and reigned from 1778 to 1797. In 1780, he ordered the fortress of Kota Kuala Bahang that was destroyed by Aceh in 1619 to be rebuilt in exactly the same way as the original.

== Threat of Siam ==
Burma and Siam were at war from 1759 to 1760, 1765 to 1767 and 1785 to 1786. The 1765 to 1767 war was especially destructive to Siam where Ayutthaya was sacked. While the war was ongoing, Kedah stopped sending bunga mas to Siam. After the war ended, Siam once again became a very powerful force and demanded Kedah to resume sending the bunga mas to Siam which led Sultan Abdullah to feel threatened by the demands. He wanted to preserve the sovereignty of Kedah and the welfare of the people. Sultan Abdullah sought military assistance from East India Company (EIC) and offered Penang Island to them if they were willing to protect Kedah from Siam. Francis Light knowing the importance of the Penang Port and the usage of military bases, saw the offer as irresistible although the EIC wanted to protect the trade interests with Siam.

== Agreement, occupation and betrayal ==
Francis Light and Sultan Abdullah personally came to an agreement in 1786. Sultan Abdullah let Francis Light stay in Penang provided that he must provide military assistance for Kedah when needed.

The agreement stipulated that the:

- EIC has to provide military assistance for Kedah as long as Kedah is attacked by enemies.
- EIC must not lead the enemies of Kedah.
- EIC needs to pay as much as 30,000 Spanish Dollars each year to Sultan Abdullah as reparation.

On 11 August 1786, the Union Jack was raised in Penang. Francis Light named Penang as the "Prince of Wales Island" and their settlement as "George Town" after the British king, George III. This marked the start of British Malaya. In 1786 saw Siam conquered Patani, once again threatening Kedah. Sultan Abdullah demanded military assistance from the EIC as the agreement indicated. The EIC refused to provide assistance because Sultan Abdullah only agreed with Francis Light, not the EIC. It was stated that Light had no authority to speak on behalf of the EIC. Sultan Abdullah forced Light out of Penang. Light was reluctant to let go of Penang and offered payment for damages but was rejected by Sultan Abdullah.

In 1791, Sultan Abdullah with the help of Riau, Siak and Selangor, was able to prepare a naval attack to retake Penang. Francis Light asked for assistance from the British Military to attack the stronghold of Sultan Abdullah in Seberang Perai. Sultan Abdullah lost and was forced to agree to a peace treaty on 1 May 1791. With this treaty, the EIC officially annexed Penang. As a reward, EIC agreed to pay as much as 6,000 Spanish Dollars every year to Sultan Abdullah.

== Family ==
- He married his first wife, H.H. Tengku Puneh binti al-Marhum Sultan Sallehuddin Shah, Tengku Besar, before divorcing two years later.
- One son with Wan Mek
  - Tunku Yahya
- Three sons and six daughters with Wan Kamaliah, Tuan Mas, daughter of the Dato’ Sri Paduka Raja Laksamana of Kedah
  - Tunku Ahmad Tajuddin
  - Tunku Bisnu
  - Tunku Ahmad
  - Tunku Hitam
  - Tunku Chik
  - Tunku Zamzam
- Three sons and one daughter with Che Puan Paduka Bonda, a princess from Patani (daughter of Sultan Muhammad ‘Abdu’l Jalil Karimu’llah Mualim Shah, Raja of Patani?)
  - Tunku Ibrahim
  - Tunku Sulaiman
  - Tunku Kusu
- One son with Che Fatima Dewi, Che Mas
  - Tunku Daud
- Two sons and two daughters with Che’ Chandra Sari
  - Tunku Ya’akub
  - Tunku Muhammad Yusuf
- Two daughters with Che’ Bida Sari

Abdullah Mukarram Shah of Kedah House of Kedah Died: 1 September 1797
Regnal titles
Preceded by Muhammad Jiwa Zainal Adilin Mu'adzam Shah II	Sultan of Kedah; 1778–1797	Succeeded by Dziaddin Mukarram Shah II
