= Burney Treaty =

Treaty between the Kingdom of Siam and Great Britain in 1826

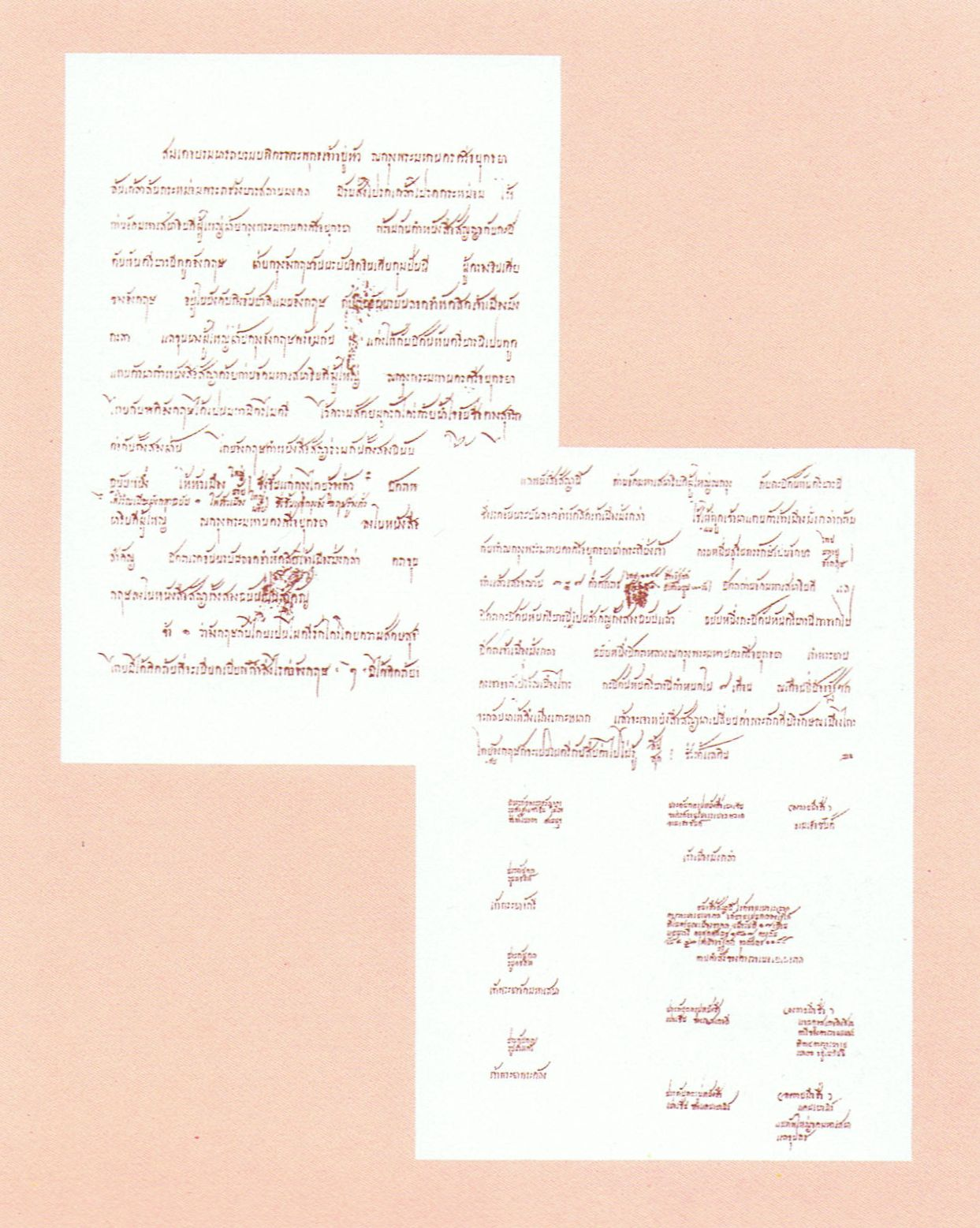
A Thai duplicate of the Burney Treaty

The treaty between Kingdom of Siam and Great Britain commonly known as the Burney Treaty was signed at Bangkok on 20 June 1826 by Henry Burney, an agent of British East India Company, for Britain, and King Rama III for Siam. It followed an earlier treaty of 24 February 1826, in which Siam became an ally of Britain against the Konbaung Dynasty (Burma) with which Britain was at war. A Siamese army was raised and equipped but took no serious part in the war because of ill feeling and suspicion arising from the Siamese invasion of Kedah in 1821.

In 1822, John Crawfurd undertook a mission to the court of King Rama II to determine Siam's position on the Malay states. The treaty acknowledged Siamese claims over the five northern Malay states of Kedah, Kelantan, Perlis, Terengganu (the future Unfederated Malay States) and Patani. The treaty further guaranteed the British possession of Penang and rights to trade in Kelantan and Terengganu without Siamese interference. The five Malay states were not represented in the treaty negotiation. In 1909, the parties of the agreement signed a new treaty, which superseded that of 1826 and transferred four of the five Malay states from Siamese to British control, Patani remaining under Siamese rule.

As the Burney Treaty did not adequately address commerce, it was a subject of the Bowring Treaty, which was signed by King Mongkut (Rama IV) on 18 April 1855 and liberalised trade rules and regulations.
