= Bunga mas =

Tribute sent to the king of Siam by vassal states in the Malay Peninsula

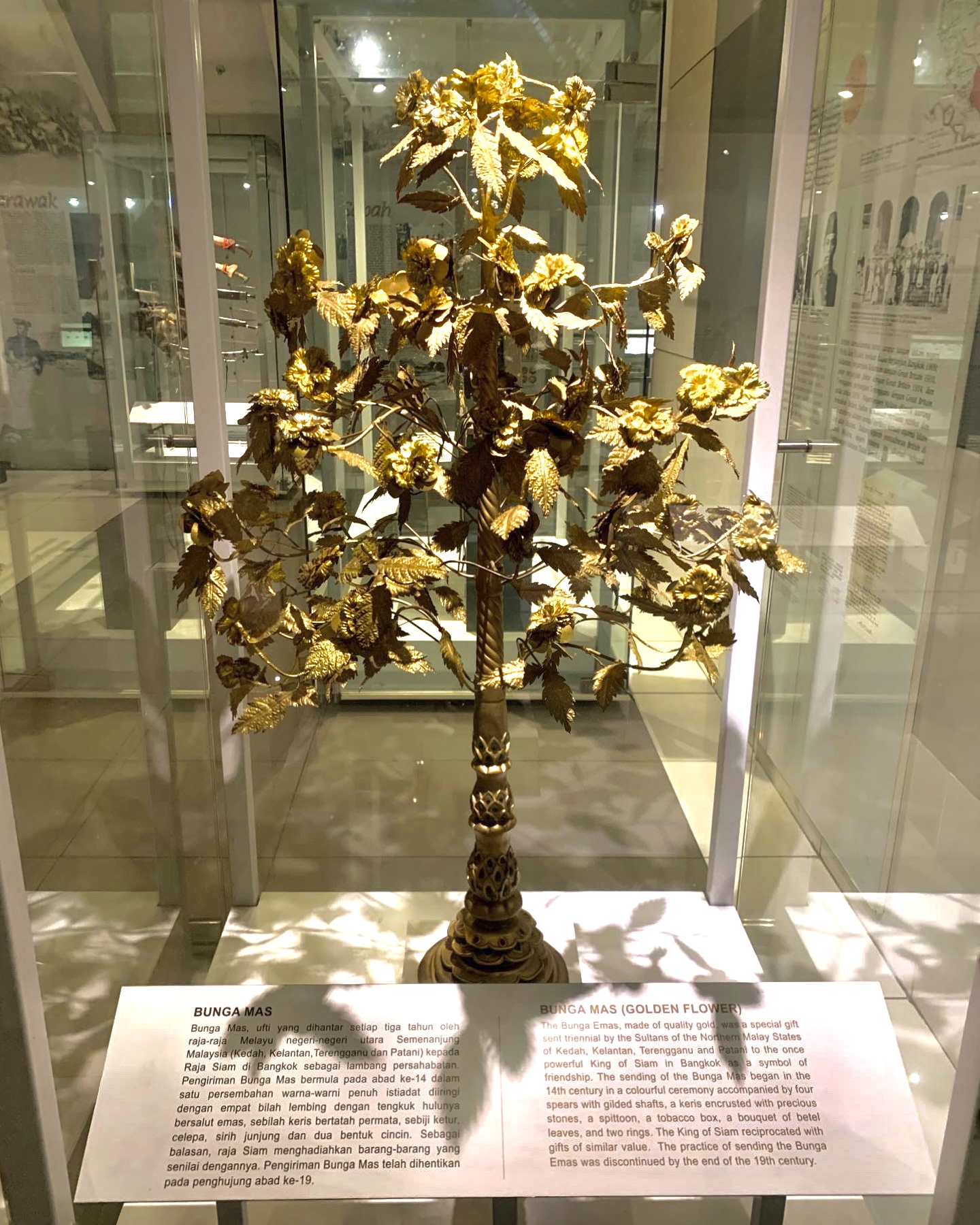
A golden tree, part of the bunga mas sent by one of the northern Malay states to the Siamese court, collection of Muzium Negara, Kuala Lumpur

The bunga emas dan perak (lit. 'golden and silver flowers'; Thai: ต้นไม้เงินต้นไม้ทอง RTGS: ton mai ngoen ton mai thong), often abbreviated to bunga mas (Jawi: بوڠا مس, lit. 'golden flowers'), was a form of tribute sent every three years to the king of Ayutthaya (Siam) from its vassal states in the Malay Peninsula, in particular, Terengganu, Kelantan, Kedah, Pattani, Nong Chik, Yala, Rangae, Kubang Pasu, and Setul. The tribute consisted of two small trees made of gold and silver, along with costly gifts of weapons, goods, and slaves.

According to a Kedahan source, the first time a bunga mas was sent, it was sent as a toy for a new-born Siamese prince, who was the grandson of Sultan of Kedah. Since his kin, a princess, was married to the Siamese king, the rulers of Kedah in the 17th-century considered it to be a token of friendship. However, later Siamese kings maintained that it was a recognition of their suzerainty.

The practice ended with the establishment of British rule in most of the northern Malay states under the terms of the Anglo-Siamese Treaty of 1909.

Before Lord Nguyễn Ánh of the Nguyễn clan was crowned Emperor of Vietnam, he had offered bunga mas to the Siamese king six times to gain military support for his campaign against the Tây Sơn dynasty.

== See also ==
- Malaysia–Thailand relations
