= Tunku Abdul Rahman =

Prime Minister of Malaysia from 1957 to 1970

His Highness Tunku Abdul Rahman DMN DK (Kedah) DK I (Johor) DK (Kelantan) DK (Perlis) DK I (Selangor) DK I (Terengganu) DK I (Brunei) DUK SPMS DUNM SPMB
- تونكو عبد الرحمن
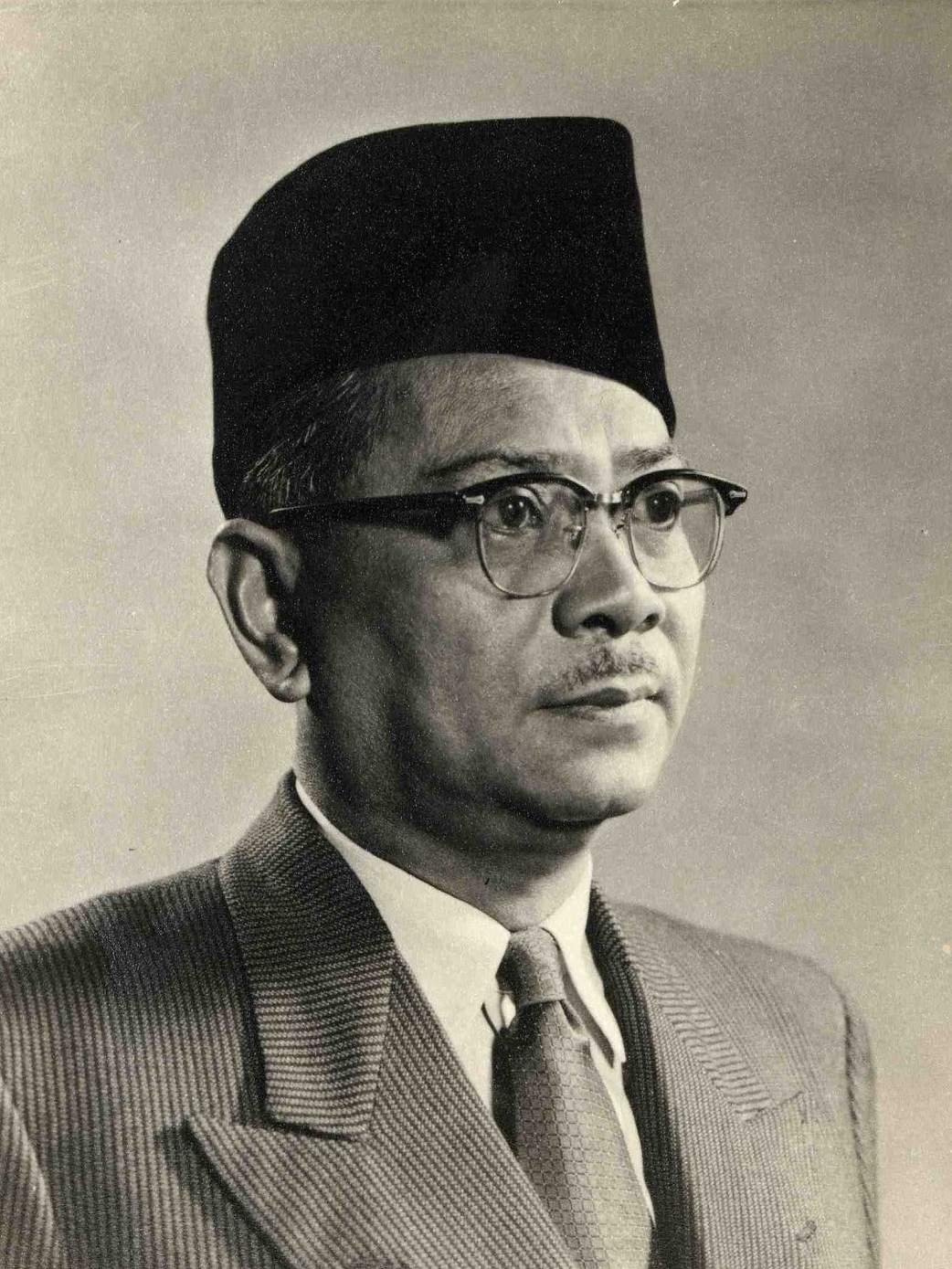
- Official portrait, c. early-1950s

1st Prime Minister of Malaysia (Note: As prime minister of Malaya prior to 16 September 1963.)
- In office 31 August 1957 – 22 September 1970
- Monarchs: Abdul Rahman; Hisamuddin; Putra; Ismail Nasiruddin; Abdul Halim
- Deputy: Abdul Razak Hussein
- Preceded by: Office established (Note: A continuation of the office of chief minister of Malaya.)
- Succeeded by: Abdul Razak Hussein

President of UMNO
- In office 25 August 1951 – 23 January 1971
- Preceded by: Onn Jaafar
- Succeeded by: Abdul Razak Hussein
Ministerial portfolios
Chief Minister of Malaya
In office 1 August 1955 – 31 August 1957
Monarch	Elizabeth II
High Commissioner	Donald MacGillivray
Preceded by	Office established
Succeeded by	Office abolished (Note: Replaced by the office of prime minister of Malaya.)
Minister
1955–1957	Home Affairs
1957–1959	External Affairs
1960–1970	Foreign Affairs
1964–1966	Youth and Sports
Parliamentary offices
Member of Parliament for Sungei Muda
In office 27 July 1955 – 19 August 1959
Preceded by	Constituency created
Succeeded by	Constituency abolished
Member of Parliament for Kuala Kedah
In office 19 August 1959 – 8 December 1972 (Note: Parliament suspended between 15 May 1969 and 20 February 1971.)
Preceded by	Constituency created
Succeeded by	Senu Abdul Rahman
Other positions
1958–1977	President of AFC
1970–1973	Secretary General of OIC

Personal details
- Born: Tunku Abdul Rahman Putra Al-Haj ibni Sultan Abdul Hamid Halim Shah; 8 February 1903 Alor Setar, Kedah Sultanate, Kingdom of Siam
- Died: 6 December 1990 (aged 87) Kuala Lumpur, Malaysia
- Resting place: Kedah Royal Mausoleum, Langgar, Kedah
- Party: UMNO (1946–1988); Independent (1988–1990)
- Other political affiliations: Alliance (1952–1973); Barisan Nasional (1973–1988)
- Spouses: Meriam Chong (m. 1933; died 1935) Violet Coulson (m. 1935; div. 1946) Sharifah Rodziah Barakbah (m. 1939) Bibi Chong (m. 1963)
- Children: 7
- Parents: Sultan Abdul Hamid Halim Shah Sultan Ahmad Tajuddin Mukarram Shah (father); Cik Menyelara (mother)
- Relatives: Sultan Badlishah Sultan Abdul Hamid Halim Shah (brother)
- Education: Sultan Abdul Hamid College; Debsirin School; Penang Free School
- Alma mater: St Catharine's College, Cambridge (BA); Inner Temple
- Awards: Full list

Tunku Abdul Rahman (Note: Formally Tunku Abdul Rahman Putra Al-Haj ibni Sultan Abdul Hamid Halim Shah, Jawi: تونكو عبد الرحمن ڤوترا الحاج ابن المرحوم سلطان عبد الحميد حليم شاه) (Jawi: تونكو عبد الرحمن; 8 February 1903 – 6 December 1990), widely known simply as Tunku, was a Malaysian statesman who served as the first prime minister of Malaysia from 1957 until 1970. He was also the only chief minister of the Federation of Malaya from 1955 to 1957, president of UMNO from 1951 to 1971, and leader of the Alliance Party from 1952 to 1971. As the leading advocate for self-governance, Tunku was central to the Malayan Declaration of Independence and the creation of Malaysia in 1963. He is widely recognised as the country's founding father and remains its second longest-serving prime minister.

A prince of the Kedah Sultanate, Tunku studied in Malaya and later graduated from St Catharine's College, Cambridge. Upon returning, he joined the colonial civil service, serving as district officer before becoming a public prosecutor in 1949. He entered politics by winning the UMNO leadership election in 1951 and formed the Alliance Party with the Malaysian Chinese Association and Malaysian Indian Congress the following year. Alliance won a landslide victory in the 1955 general election, after which Tunku became chief minister. He unsuccessfully attempted to negotiate an end to the Malayan Emergency through the Baling Talks, but successfully secured independence for Malaya through the Treaty of London in 1956. He proclaimed independence in 1957 and won a fresh mandate in the 1959 general election, before overseeing the formation of Malaysia in 1963, which included Singapore, Sabah and Sarawak. He led the Alliance to another victory in 1964 but was increasingly troubled by ethnic tensions, particularly due to the worsening relationship with Singapore.

In 1965, following mutual provocations between UMNO and the People's Action Party (PAP) led by Lee Kuan Yew, he resolved to expel Singapore from the federation, formalised through the Independence of Singapore Agreement 1965, with full separation taking effect on 9 August 1965. He won a fourth term in the 1969 general election, but the Alliance’s reduced majority was followed by violent unrest during the 13 May incident, prompting a national emergency. Tunku stepped down as prime minister in 1970 and was succeeded by Abdul Razak Hussein. In retirement, he remained active in sports and international Islamic affairs, serving as president of the Asian Football Confederation and as the first secretary-general of the Organisation of Islamic Cooperation. He died in Kuala Lumpur on 6 December 1990, aged 87.

== Early life and education ==
Tunku Abdul Rahman was born on 8 February 1903 in Alor Setar, Kedah, the seventh son and one of 45 children of Sultan Abdul Hamid Halim Shah, the 26th ruler of the Kedah Sultanate. His mother, Cik Menyelara (Nueang Nandanagara), was of Thai descent and the sixth consort of the Sultan. She was the daughter of Luang Naraborirak (Kleb Nandanagara), a district officer in Thailand. Kedah at the time was afflicted by outbreaks of cholera and malaria, and several of Tunku’s siblings succumbed to illness. He himself suffered frequent bouts of malaria until his departure for England in 1920.

Tunku began his education at the Alor Setar Malay Primary School before enrolling in the English-language Sultan Abdul Hamid College. He and his siblings were later sent to Debsirin School in Bangkok, reflecting the family's close ties to Thailand. In 1915, he returned to Malaya and resumed his studies at the Penang Free School, one of the oldest English-language schools in the region. At the age of 17, he was awarded a Kedah State Government scholarship to pursue higher education in England, and he sailed for the United Kingdom shortly thereafter.

Initially struggling with his studies, Tunku met with his guardian at the offices of the Crown Agents, who arranged for him to transfer to Cambridge and study under Basil Atkinson, a respected private tutor. Under Atkinson’s guidance, he was prepared for the university entrance examination, known as the "Little Go", in which he achieved high marks across all papers and passed overall. He was admitted to St Catharine’s College, University of Cambridge, where he read law and history, graduating with a Bachelor of Arts degree in 1925. Five years after his initial departure from Malaya, he returned home at the age of 23. Although he arrived with academic credentials, his elder brother and the Regent of Kedah, Tunku Ibrahim, was dissatisfied with his choice of study and instructed him to return to England to qualify for the English Bar. During this period, Tunku helped found the Malay Society of Great Britain, appointing Abdul Rahman of Negeri Sembilan (later the first Yang di-Pertuan Agong) as president, while serving as its honorary secretary and principal organiser.

== Career in Kedah ==
=== Kulim ===
In January 1931, Tunku was appointed a Cadet in the Kedah Civil Service. Later, he was transferred to Kulim as Assistant District Officer. In Kulim, he devoted much of his time touring the district and getting to know the problems of the peasants who made up 90% of the population. He also devoted some of his time to prepare for the Cadet's Law exam to qualify for the promotion. He took the exams and passed them on his first attempt.

=== Padang Terap ===
About a year later, he was promoted to District Officer of Padang Terap. The post was unpopular because Kuala Nerang was rife with malaria. As soon as he took over the district, he gave orders for a survey to be made of the swamps which bordered the town, obtained an estimate for draining them, and applied to the State Secretariat for the necessary funds. However, his plea for funds was rejected. He wrote again to the State Secretariat, asking that funds be made available to drain the swamps and to rid Kuala Nerang of the main breeding place malaria carriers. This time the money came and the work was carried out under his supervision.

=== Langkawi ===
Because Tunku Ibrahim, the Regent, was known to be strongly opposed to mixed marriages and since there was a law in Kedah which forbade members of the royal family to marry non-Malays without the prior approval of the Ruler or Regent, the Tunku Abdul Rahman married Violet Coulson who lived in Penang. In 1934, the regent died unexpectedly and was succeeded as regent by Tunku Mahmud, the sultan's younger brother, who was more broad-minded and gave consent to the marriage. This enabled Violet to move to Kuala Nerang, but the Secretary to the Government showed his disapproval by transferring Tunku Abdul Rahman to the isolated post of District Officer at Langkawi.

The district consisted of a group of islands, thinly populated, sparsely cultivated, and without roads. When the Tunku applied for government funds to develop Langkawi his application was rejected. Ever-resourceful, his way in winning co-operation from members of the public of all communities led to the construction of a jetty and later to the opening of several earth roads using money and material which he collected.

== World War II and the Japanese occupation ==
While in London, he sat once more for the Bar Examinations, as he planned to leave the Civil Service, and to enter private practice as soon as he had qualified as an advocate and solicitor. He succeeded in passing the Part One Examination, in 1939. However, with the advent of World War II, he was recalled to Malaya and ordered to resume duty as District Officer in Kulim, where he remained for the next three years.

He was responsible for the Civil Defence preparations implemented by district officers. He was appointed Deputy Director of Air Raid Precautions for South Kedah. He recognised the need to prepare for the evacuation of civilians in the event of an invasion and in 1941 he gave orders for the construction of six "Long Houses" made of round timber and with attap roofs on a low hill about two miles away from the town. Funds for this work had been refused by the State Secretariat and he, therefore, invited donations from local town dwellers who would benefit if evacuations became necessary.

By October 1941, British troops had prepared defensive positions in North Kedah. On the morning of 8 December 1941, the Invasion by the Japanese army began. The attack was quickly followed by the advance of General Yamashita's army which had landed unopposed on beaches near Songkla the previous night. A second assault force came ashore, unopposed, on the coast of Petani and advanced towards Betong and Kroh. A third but smaller force landed close to Kota Bahru in Kelantan despite vigorous opposition.

Unaware of the extent of the Japanese attack, he went to his office and ordered a general alert for his air wardens. Later that morning, he met the leading shopkeepers and advised them to evacuate their families to the "Long House".

His eldest surviving brother, Tunku Badlishah, had succeeded Tunku Mahmud as Regent in 1937 when the latter died. He was now in control, since Sultan Abdul Hamid, although still alive, was incapacitated. At about 9 o'clock on the night of the invasion, Syed Omar telephoned Tunku and told him that the Regent had decided to evacuate the 77-year-old Sultan to Penang, and thence to Singapore. Tunku disagreed with this decision, feeling the need for the Sultan to remain with his people, he absconded with him during the journey. Soon after, the Japanese began bombing Penang.

=== Occupation ===
With the Japanese's bombing Penang, the Regent and his family fled. They were given accommodation in Sidim when the second and more severe bombing of Penang town took place on 11 December 1941, which caused hundreds of civilians to be killed. Upon returning, to Kulim, Tunku found out that all the Police were no longer on duty. Tunku's first concern was to prevent looting and he called all members of the disbanded Kedah Volunteer Force in Kulim to come to his assistance. These men formed a vigilante corps and Tunku arranged for them to patrol the town at night. He was also responsible for the acquiring of emergency food stores from the Government Rice Mill at Bagan Serai in Perak. By 16 December 1941, the Japanese army had occupied the west coast of Kedah, including all the main towns. The Japanese Military Governor of Kedah an assuming office appointed another of Tunku's brothers, Tunku Mohamed Jewa, to be a temporary Regent until the Sultan returned to Alor Setar.

On 17 December, the Sultan, the Regent, and his family and senior officers of the State Government set off for Alor Setar with a Japanese military escort. In Kulim, Tunku reluctantly remained as District Officer for another year as a servant to the Japanese Military Administration.

Friction between Tunku and the Japanese officials were frequent, and he was removed from his position of authority. The Siamese was then put in charge. Soon after the takeover by the Siamese, Tunku was appointed the Superintendent of Education.

In 1942, the Japanese transported thousands of young male Malayans to work on the construction of a railway from North Siam to Burma. Tunku helped house and feed some escapees from the railway construction project at considerable risk to himself.

On 6 and 9 August 1945, atom bombs were dropped on Hiroshima and Nagasaki respectively. A week later, the Japanese Imperial government in Tokyo agreed to an unconditional surrender.

=== Malayan Peoples' Anti-Japanese Army movement (MPAJA) ===
When the Japanese surrender was announced over the wireless in mid-August, plans were hurriedly prepared in Ceylon for the dispatch of a British Military Administration. At the same time, the top Chinese Communist leaders in Malaya, Fong Chong Pik, who was nicknamed "the Plen" and a young Chinese Rebel named Chin Peng decided to try to seize control of the civil administration in as many states as possible. Tunku and his followers were responsible for the peace-keeping efforts and the protection of Alor Setar from the Malayan People's Anti-Japanese Army.

== Malayan Union and study leave ==
=== Protest against Malayan Union ===
On 19 August, the surrender of the Japanese Army had become common knowledge in Alor Setar. With the Japanese surrender, several groups of people talked about independence and discussed how it might be attained. Malay societies were formed all over the peninsular with similar objectives, but with no coordination. On 10 October 1945, the Secretary of State for the Colonies issued his Policy Statement on a "Malayan Union". In Kedah, both the principal Malay organisations held protest meetings and rallies. Tunku spoke forcefully at these rallies, but he recommended opposition by peaceful means.

Sir Harold MacMichael, representing the British Government, arrived in Kuala Lumpur on 11 October 1945. He came to Alor Setar after visiting the Sultans of Johor, Selangor, Pahang, and Perak and securing their signatures to a new treaty. In Kedah, MacMichael was told that the Ruler would consult his Council of State before discussing with him. With these consultations proceeded, rallies and processions in opposition to the treaty were held in every district and the center of Alor Setar. Tunku was one of the most popular speakers in Alor Setar, Sungai Petani, and Kulim, but he was not invited to take part in any of the discussions convened by his half-brother, Sultan Badlishah. After three days of negotiations, the Sultan followed the example of his brother rulers. The Sultan's surrender was vigorously criticised by the public and by Tunku. MacMichael flew back to London after securing all the signatures from the rulers for the new treaty. Then the British Prime Minister announced that the Malayan Union would come into effect on 1 April 1946.

A British officer who had held Tunku's post before the war was appointed Superintendent of Education, Kedah in his place. The State Government did not give Tunku any new position. During this period, Tunku held no office in any Malay organisation.

=== Law Studies ===
Tunku applied for 18 months' study leave and arranged to return to England to resume his law studies. He arrived in bunker on 27 December 1946 and travelled by train to London, and remained there for the next 18 months.

When he passed all his law exams, Tunku sailed back to Malaya on the P.&.O. Corfu in January 1949 to be met by his wife, children, and friends in Penang. A few days later he called on the Secretary to the Government to inform him that he was now a qualified advocate and solicitor, but the reception was neutral. Tunku was instructed to report to the State Legal Advisor for duty as a deputy public prosecutor. His work was routine and he spent his days reading case files.

== Political career ==
=== United Malay National Organisation (UMNO) ===
Tunku was invited to accept the chairmanship of the Kedah branch of UMNO, the political party which had been formed by Dato' Onn Jaafar. But before long, the Attorney-General, Fosters-Sutton, visited Kedah and met Tunku in his office to ask if he would like to take up a new appointment in Kuala Lumpur, which Tunku accepted. In Kuala Lumpur, Tunku was allotted an office in the Federal Secretariat, together with other Deputy Public Prosecutors. Tunku's work received a favourable report and he was transferred with promotion, to the post of President of the Selangor Court. At the same time, a political crisis was brewing in UMNO. When the Communist revolutionaries launched an armed rebellion from jungle bases during the Malayan Emergency, UMNO founder and president, Onn, felt the need for racial harmony and a non-communal political party.

A General Assembly was to be held in Kuala Lumpur in August 1951, and Onn had made it known that if his proposals were not accepted in this meeting, he would resign. Malay leaders while discussing the crisis recognised that they must find a successor to Onn. At that time, Tunku's qualities and ability as a leader were almost unknown outside Kedah. Finally, three candidates, including Tunku, were suggested to be nominated for the post of President if Onn stepped down. Abdul Razak, the State Secretary of Pahang and UMNO vice president went to meet Tunku in his house, to ask him to agree to the nomination, but Tunku was reluctant. Instead, Tunku replied that Razak himself was much better qualified to be nominated. But Razak convinced Tunku that he was much too young to gain the support of the Malay masses.

After much persuasion, Tunku reluctantly accepted the nomination. The UMNO Assembly met on 23 August 1951, where Tunku received 57 votes and his nearest rival had 11. In his acceptance speech, Tunku demanded that independence should be granted to Malaya as soon as possible. Tunku was still President of the Sessions Court in Kuala Lumpur, with daily duties to perform drawing a government salary and living in government quarters. Tunku informed the Chief Justice of his intention to resign from government service.

In the eyes of the average UMNO member, Tunku was first and foremost the brother of the Sultan of Kedah, and a member of a royal house, which carried some prestige within Malaya. Tunku had acquired a wealth of experience as a district officer in Kedah, which enables him to understand and sympathise with the problems of the rural population, who made up a large proportion of the UMNO membership.

=== Alliance Party ===
At the time of Onn Jaafar's resignation from the presidency of UMNO, he had predicted that the party would disintegrate within three months. But even before the end of that period, it became clear that although influential Chinese and some prominent Indians and Ceylonese had become members of Onn Jaafar's new party, very few Malays had done so. Tunku held and expressed the view that Malayan communities could not be united within a single political party. He believed that each community needs its political party and its political leaders, and he was proven to be right. The first trial of strength between all the rival political parties took place in January 1952.

On 6 October 1951, Sir Henry Gurney was killed in an ambush by communist revolutionaries. He was replaced by General Sir Gerald Templer who brought with him a new policy from the British Government in London. Templer was to guide the people of Malaya towards the attainment of a United Malayan Nation. The policy had also called for the partnership of all communities. To put this new policy into effect, the government had agreed to hold elections at the Municipal and Town Council level, as the first step towards a democratic government, and Kuala Lumpur was chosen as one of the venues for the experiment. All the existing political parties were prepared to contest.

One of these political organisation was the Malayan Chinese Association, or MCA. MCA was brought into existence in 1949 by two men, Colonel H. S. Lee, the President of the Selangor Mining Association, and Tan Cheng Lock of Malacca. It occurred to him that if MCA and UMNO allied at the municipal level, their chances of success would be greater. Together with his deputy, they met and sought the approval of Dato' Yahaya, the Chairman of UMNO in Kuala Lumpur. They quickly reached an agreement. Under the chairmanship of Col. H. S. Lee, a combined committee from the MCA and UMNO was formed and 12 candidates were selected, one for each area, some Malays, some Chinese, and one Indian. The committee then began a vigorous campaign to enlist support for "The Alliance".

News of the venture appeared in all the leading newspapers. Tunku was in Province Wellesley when he read the news. He received a telephone call from a UMNO leader in Kuala Lumpur asking him to come back at once for a discussion. On his way to meet the UMNO leaders in Kuala Lumpur, he saw a leading member of Independence of Malaya Party, or IMP, and asked for his opinion of the "Alliance". Tunku was confronted by protesting political colleagues, but he told them that he supported the Alliance and Intended to help in the campaign in Kuala Lumpur.

At the counting of votes on 16 February 1952, the "Alliance" won nine seats, IMP, two, and an independent one. The success of the UMNO-MCA alliance was repeated in other municipal and town council elections, starting in Johor Bahru, where, to the chagrin of Dato' Onn, the Alliance won all the seats.

Tunku followed up the Municipal elections by holding a 'Round Table Conference' on 3 February 1953, attended by leaders of the MCA and UMNO, in the Selangor Miner's Club, Kuala Lumpur. Everyone agreed to establish a permanent alliance of UMNO and MCA as a political body with Independence for Malaya as its principal objective.

They also discussed the possibility of forming a united front with the Independence of Malayan Party, or the IMP. Tunku arranged a meeting with Onn. He brought H. S. Lee and Dr. Ismail. Onn brought three lawyers and two Malay civil servants. At the meeting, Onn told Tunku that IMP could only work together with the Alliance leaders if they disbanded the Alliance and joined IMP. Tunku tried to find some ground for compromise, but Onn was adamant and the meeting ended. Tunku disagreed fundamentally with Onn's conception of a single political party consisting of members of all communities. He knew by instinct that each community needed its political party. The challenge that lay before him was finding a way to unite the communal parties. Soon, the Alliance leaders met again to discuss their campaign. They drew up proposals that included a request for an elected majority and a firm date for the first elections.

At the Legislative Council, when the demands by the Alliance were discussed, Onn told the Legislative Council that the holding of the elections should be planned as a gradual process and he questioned Tunku's demand. Onn's remarks were relayed to the Secretary of State and damaged Tunku's image.

=== Meeting in London ===
In August 1953, Gerald Templer offered Tunku a portfolio in the Government, but Tunku refused it. Earlier in July 1953, the government set up a working committee to examine the possibility of holding State and Federal Elections. The committee was set up after Templer obtained the concurrence of Malay Rulers who at first were quite reluctant to accept such proposals due to their deep-rooted fear of what might befall them if Independence were granted. When the names of the members of the Election Committee were announced, Tunku observed that a majority of them were Onn Jaafar's supporters.

During the discussion, the members found themselves in two groups. The majority approved certain recommendations while the Alliance minority disagreed and made their proposals. When the majority of recommendations were accepted and proposed by the Government. Alliance representatives all over the country attacked the Government's proposals with a new rallying cry – 'Merdeka'. By then, recommendations had been forwarded to London, and Tunku in consultations with the Alliance leaders decided that they must ask for an interview with the Secretary of State in London. Tunku sent a long telegram to the Secretary of State asking him to meet a delegation from the Alliance.

On 14 April 1954, a reply was received from the Secretary of State who rejected the request for an interview. Emergency meetings of UMNO and MCA leaders were held and a decision was made. The decision was severely criticised both inside and outside the Alliance and it required great courage and determination for Tunku to proceed. Next were the financial problems. Tunku called for an emergency meeting at UMNO in Malacca where he asked for financial help. The response from UMNO members was swift. A quantity of money and even personal jewellery were handed to Tunku. After some final travel arrangements, Tunku and T.H Tan left Singapore on 21 April 1954, for London. Tunku flew to London all too conscious of the doubts of his Alliance partners and the strong criticism from Government officials.

Before he left, he was aware that Onn Jaafar had dissolved IMP and formed a new political party called 'Parti Negara'. Onn had abandoned his vision of an all-communities party and directed his attention to the Malay community. Tunku realised that Parti Negara would attempt to weaken UMNO and subvert some of his UMNO supporters. But Tunku also knew that he must act now if the granting of Independence was not to be delayed indefinitely. London in mid-April 1954 was cold, damp, and cheerless. There was not even one press reporter to meet Tunku. Knowing their financial resources were limited, Tunku took T.H. Tan with him to Gloucester Road Hotel and booked a double room. He then telephoned his old friend, David Rees, who was now a prominent member of the British Labour Party.

David Rees was the Parliamentary Under-Secretary of State for the Colonies under the Labour government from 1947 to 1950. David Rees was a valuable and influential ally. Tunku and Tan went to meet him the next morning in his chambers near the Inner Temple. David Rees promised to do everything possible to persuade Oliver Lyttleton to receive Tunku and his delegation. His persuasion proved to be potent, and on 24 April, Lyttleton agreed to meet Tunku. However, there was one problem. Lyttleton had arranged to leave for Uganda on an official visit on the following day and would not return until 10 May. It was a long time to wait and it would be stretch their financial resources to the limit, but Tunku decided to stay on.

Meanwhile, with David Rees's help, Tunku gave a press conference at which he explained the popular support for the Alliance. He then had meetings with members of parliament of all three parties. Tunku's relaxed manner, the fluency of his spoken English and his genial personality attracted his audience and provided ample justification for his mission. When the contents of the 'Election Proposal' were released by the Colonial Office only then did Tunku discover that the Secretary of State had not accepted all the recommendations of the Election Committee. But Tunku was not satisfied. He had asked for at least 60 elected members. A substantial majority of elected members was essential.

While Lyttleton was overseas Tunku prepared his brief and on 14 May, Tunku, Abdul Razak and T.H Tan were ushered into the Secretary of State's room in the Colonial Office. Tunku explained in detail the Alliance's views on the importance of a workable elected majority and the need for early elections, but the Secretary of State insisted that the Alliance try out the Colonial Office Election proposals. Tunku pressed on further for an agreement on at least three-fifths of the elected majority but the Secretary of State wouldn't commit to his suggestion.

Finally, the meeting came to an end. Tunku had to fly back on 20 May, to attend the debate on the Elections Committee proposals in the Legislative Council. A letter from the Colonial Office was delivered to Tunku's hotel room on 19 May. It was beautifully phrased, but the contents could be summarised in two words – no change. T.H Tan cabled the gist of the reply to the Alliance co-chairman, Tan Cheng Lock. He and Tunku then left London the next day, leaving Abdul Razak to open a UMNO-MCA Merdeka Freedom Bureau through which publicity material in support of early independence could be distributed in England.

=== Boycott ===
In Kuala Lumpur, Tunku met members of the UMNO Executive Committee in the morning, and the "Alliance Round Table" members the same night. The Alliance leaders accepted the view that the mission had achieved a measure of success. It was also agreed that the request from the Secretary of State to give the elections proposals a trial could not be accepted. They prepared a resolution which was drafted by Col. H.S. Lee, rejecting the Colonial Office proposals. The next day, Tunku, Dr. Ismail and Leong Yew Koh, the Secretary-General of MCA took the Resolution to General Templer's office. Templer read the document without comment and then requested that the release of the resolutions to the press be delayed.

At the Alliance Round Table meeting that night, the Alliance was adamant and the boycott went into effect. About a thousand Alliance members at all levels took part. It was a subtle process with results that were not immediately felt, but which were cumulative. The boycott was widely criticised. The Secretary of State called for consultations with the Rulers by the High Commissioner. Tunku decided that the Alliance should take the initiative and present their views first.

That day, nearly 2,000 Alliance supporters assembled at the government office building in support of the proposals. Attempts to break the Alliance boycott were made by Michael Hogan, the Attorney General, and David Gray, the acting Chief Secretary, Hogan and Gray met MacGillivray with their suggestions, and the High Commissioner agreed to their initiative.

Hogan and Gray then met H.S. Lee in Kuala Lumpur and explained the motive of their visit. H. S. Lee then contacted Tunku and Dr. Ismail who was in Johor Bahru with the news. Tunku reacted positively to the compromise offered but he wanted further assurance from the High Commissioner himself. On 6 July, MacGillivray signed a letter agreeing to the Alliance's request after receiving approval from Lyttleton. The Alliance then called off the boycott.

=== Elections ===
After The Alliance called off the boycott, Elections to State Councils with Alliance participation could now proceed. Tunku and his colleagues travelled tirelessly to prepare for the coming trial of strength. Tunku took Tan Cheng Lock and H.S Lee with him whenever possible and in particular when touring the northern Malay states, and emphasised the importance of unity among Malayans of all communities. At each State capital, the Alliance leaders called on the Ruler and assured him of their loyalty and support.

The links between UMNO and MCA grew stronger and on Tunku's initiative, a National Council which became the supreme executive body of the Alliance was established. It took the place of the 'Round Table' which had no executive power and Tunku was formally recognised as 'Leader of the Alliance'. The first two elections to State Councils took place late in 1954 in Johor and Terengganu. In both states, the Alliance won sweeping victories. Parti Negara did not capture a single seat. Tunku was now a popular figure in every state and almost every kampung. He travelled constantly.

Towards the end of 1954, Tunku was invited by the Director of Operations to serve on the Federation War Executive Committee. The government had promised to hold elections to the Federal Legislative Council in 1955, and in March of that year, it was announced that Nomination Day would be in June and that 27 July would be Election Day. Many Malay government officers resigned to offer themselves as candidates. As nomination day approached, Tunku was plagued by demands that a high proportion of the candidates should be Malay.

Tunku brought the matter to the next UMNO Assembly and urged the members to adopt what he called "a policy of racial unselfishness". Tunku's arguments were compelling and he won a unanimous vote of confidence. Almost at the eleventh hour, Tunku's repeated emphasis on the importance of unity during the elections brought him a bonus. The Malayan Indian Congress, MIC, which had wavered in its support of Parti Negara, now promised to back the Alliance, representing the Indian community.

On Nomination Day, the Alliance entered a candidate in every one of the 52 constituencies. Parti Negara entered 30 candidates. 29 Malays and one Chinese. Four other political parties entered a total of 29 candidates. Eighteen others stood as independents. Two weeks before Nomination Day, Onn announced that he would stand in Johor Bahru, and challenged Tunku to stand against him. It was a tactical error. The Alliance let it be known that the Party would decide where Tunku should stand, and it allowed the headquarters to select a candidate who could be expected to defeat Onn.

Tunku's resisted invitations to forecast the election results, but he let it be known that he was confident of an Alliance victory. It was only during the last week of the elections that Tunku toured his constituency. Everywhere he went, he was promised total support. He spent the day before the elections in the UMNO House in Alor Setar and telephoned the Alliance headquarters in every state.

On polling day, after casting his vote, he drove himself on a whirlwind tour to constituencies in Kedah and then set off to Kuala Lumpur accompanied by T.H Tan. Tunku stopped at every main polling station en route and only arrived in Kuala Lumpur at 11 pm, making it possible for him to enter the town unrecognised. Tunku always enjoyed the company of his friends but on the night of 27 July, he was exhausted and wanted to be alone. Tunku spent the night at the Eastern Hotel, listening to the results of the elections until the Kuala Lumpur Radio Station went off the air at 3 AM.

Tunku won with a majority of more than 20,000 votes, Sulaiman won with 5,943 votes and Dato' Onn only managed to secure 2,802 votes. The Alliance won 51 seats, the Pan Malayan Islamic Party (PMIP) won only one seat, and the National Party (PN) won none.

=== Early days as Chief Minister ===
High Commissioner MacGillivray invited Tunku to the King's House for a first formal discussion on Sunday, 31 July. Tunku handed the High Commissioner a list of 11 Cabinet Ministers: six Malays, three Chinese, and two Indians. The list would still have to be passed to the Rulers for their formal concurrence that would take some time. On 1 August, Tunku was received by a British Assistant Secretary to the Government at the Federal Secretariat building.

On 9 August, Tunku made his first broadcast to the nation from an old wooden structure at Young Road, Kuala Lumpur. During the broadcast, he said:

I am very determined to strive for self-government and Independence as soon as possible by constitutional means. Others have been obliged to fight the colonial power before they achieved their freedom and this will not be necessary in Malaya.

The Alliance has proved that they have the support of at least 80 percent of adult population, and that the three principal communities worked closely together at all levels to win the election. I will take the opportunity to ask the new Secretary of State for the Colonies to arrange for constitutional talks in London as soon as possible since the present Federal Constitution is now workable during his visit to Kuala Lumpur.

The Malayan Emergency continues to obstruct progress and swallow up funds that should be used for development and I will try my best to end the Emergency through a fresh initiative. Finally, I assure government officers who belong to other political parties that they have no reason to fear official disfavor.

There had been another General Election in the United Kingdom, won again by the Conservatives. Alan Lennox-Boyd was the new Secretary of States for the Colonies. He was to visit Malaya and be present at the new Legislative Council meeting on 1 September. At their first informal meeting at King's House in Kuala Lumpur, Tunku found in the new Secretary of State an unexpected affinity. They were able to speak freely and they shared a sense of humour. Lennox-Boyd agreed to hold constitutional talks in London in January 1956, provided that the Rulers were represented. When the Rulers met at their conferences in Kuala Lumpur in September 1955, Tunku sought and was granted a special audience. Tunku asked the Rulers to appoint representatives for the constitutional talks to be held in London. As the days for the talks got closer, travel plans were discussed.

=== Baling Talks ===
In dealing with the Emergency, Tunku had offered amnesty to the communist revolutionaries soon after he became Chief Minister. 186 "Safe Areas" were named in four million leaflets, which were dropped over the jungle from Air Force planes. The results had been disappointing but an unsigned letter from Communist headquarters in South Thailand asked for a ceasefire. Tunku showed the letter to MacGillivray and General Bourne. Then, with their agreement, Tunku issued a reply in the Press stating that he was willing to meet Chin Peng.

After a further exchange of letters, Tunku and Chin Peng met in Southeast Kedah near the Siamese border in December 1955. Tunku had 2 objectives for the meeting, one was to clarify the amnesty terms, the other was to make it clear that Tunku spoke for the people of Malaya and not as a representative of the British. Chin Peng could not accept the amnesty terms because the British did not allow communists in the jungle to enjoy equal status with other Malayans. Chin Peng demanded that the Malayan Communist Party (MCP) be legalised and be allowed to participate in the elections.

Singaporean Chief Minister David Marshall asked if the MCP would lay down their arms if Malaya was granted Independence, Chin Peng refused as the amnesty offer was unacceptable to the MCP, and that they would never disband the MCP. Discussions continued after dark without either side making any concessions. The talks failed to reach an agreement and ended at 10 AM the next morning.

Following the failure of the talks, Tunku decided to withdraw the offer of an amnesty on 8 February 1956, five months after it had been offered. He stated that he would not willingly meet the communists again unless they indicated beforehand their desire to see him make "a complete surrender". He said that the Communists had made it clear to him that their ideology and that of himself and his party could not exist side by side. Therefore, the war must be intensified until one or the other gave in. "I have every confidence that the people of Malaya will give their fullest support and co-operation to the action I have taken."

== Road to Independence ==
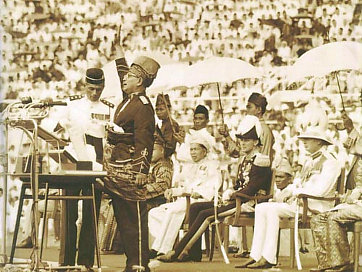
Tunku Abdul Rahman proclaiming Malayan independence on 31 August 1957

After Tunku and Lennox-Boyd agreed to hold constitutional talks in London in January 1956, provided that the Rulers were represented. When the Rulers met at their conferences in Kuala Lumpur in September 1955, Tunku sought and was granted a special audience. Tunku asked the Rulers to appoint representatives for the constitutional talks to be held in London.

Finally on 1 January 1956, the two delegations sailed together from Singapore to Karachi on the Asia, Before they arrived at Karachi, their draft proposals had been finalised, and they entered Lancaster House in London on 16 January, as the Merdeka Mission, with a single leader, Tunku.

Finally on 8 February 1956, Tunku's fifty-third birthday, he and Lennox-Boyd signed the Independence agreement, the Treaty of London, scheduled for August 1957. Tunku and his mission left London on 16 February, had a short break in Cairo and landed in Singapore four days later.

The next day, Tunku went to Malacca where he had decided to make his first public announcement on their success. His speech was simple and brief, muffled by the constant chorus of "Merdeka". Soon after Tunku's return from London, a Constitutional Commission as set up in Kuala Lumpur. The Commission travelled to every State, hearing evidence and receiving memoranda. The Alliance National Council spent months preparing a detailed memorandum from the commission, most of which were accepted.

The Commissioner's report was published in Kuala Lumpur in February 1957. MacGillivray then set up a Working Committee to prepare final recommendations for the consideration of the British Government. When the subject of 'jus soli' (citizenship by right of birth) was mentioned, Tunku, as the inspired diplomat, managed to persuade the MCA leaders to agree to its omission from the official recommendations.

== Premiership (1957–1970) ==
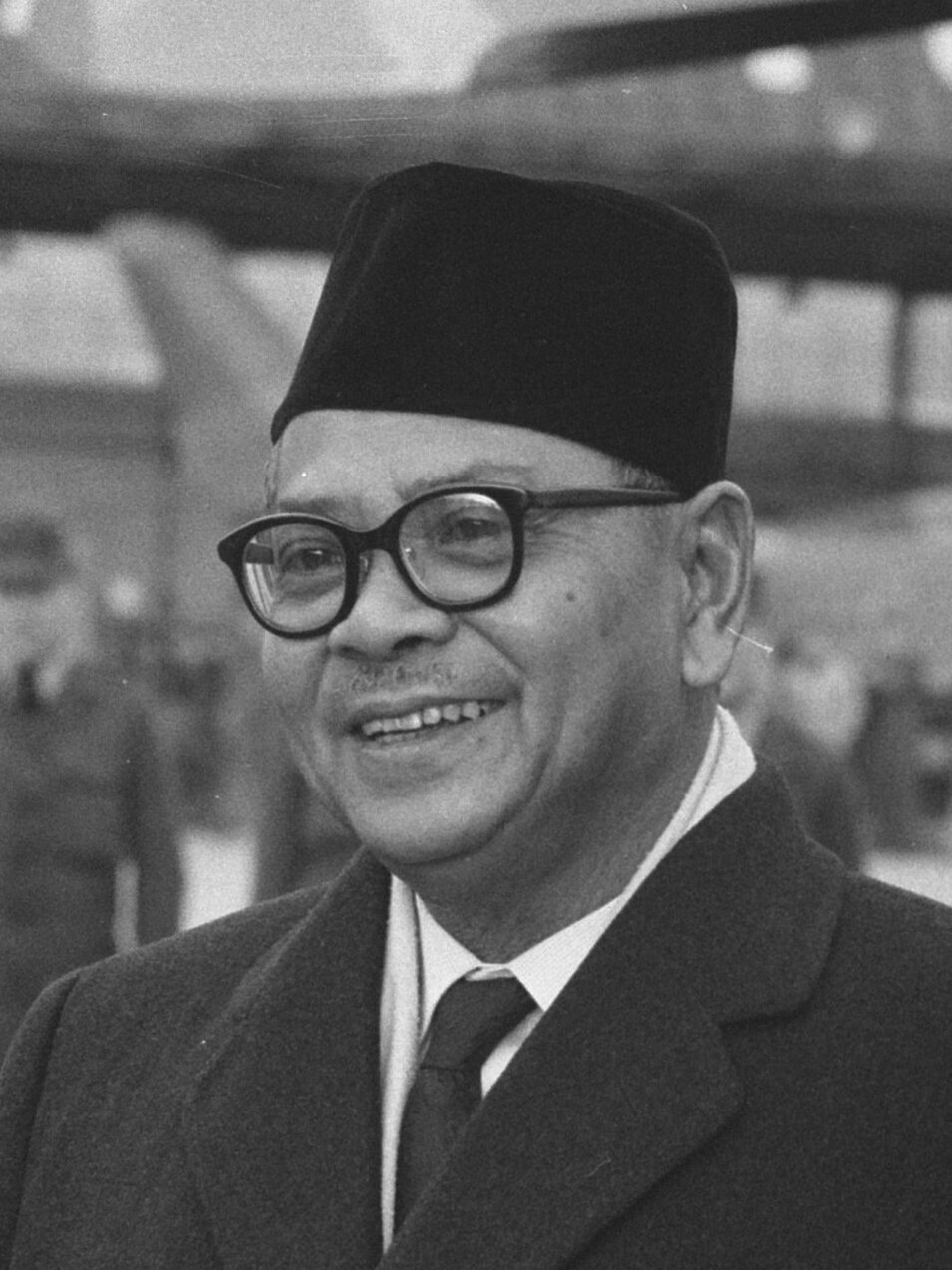
- Tunku in 1960
- Tunku Abdul Rahman; 1 August 1955 – 22 September 1970 (Note: As the Chief Minister of Malaya from 1 August 1955 to 31 August 1957.)
- Monarchs: Abdul Rahman; Hisamuddin; Putra; Ismail Nasiruddin; Abdul Halim
- Prime Minister: Tunku Abdul Rahman
- Cabinet: Rahman I; Rahman II; Rahman III; Rahman IV
- Party: Alliance–UMNO
- Election: 1955; 1959; 1964; 1969
- Seat: The Governor's Residence (1957–1962); Seri Taman (1962–1970)

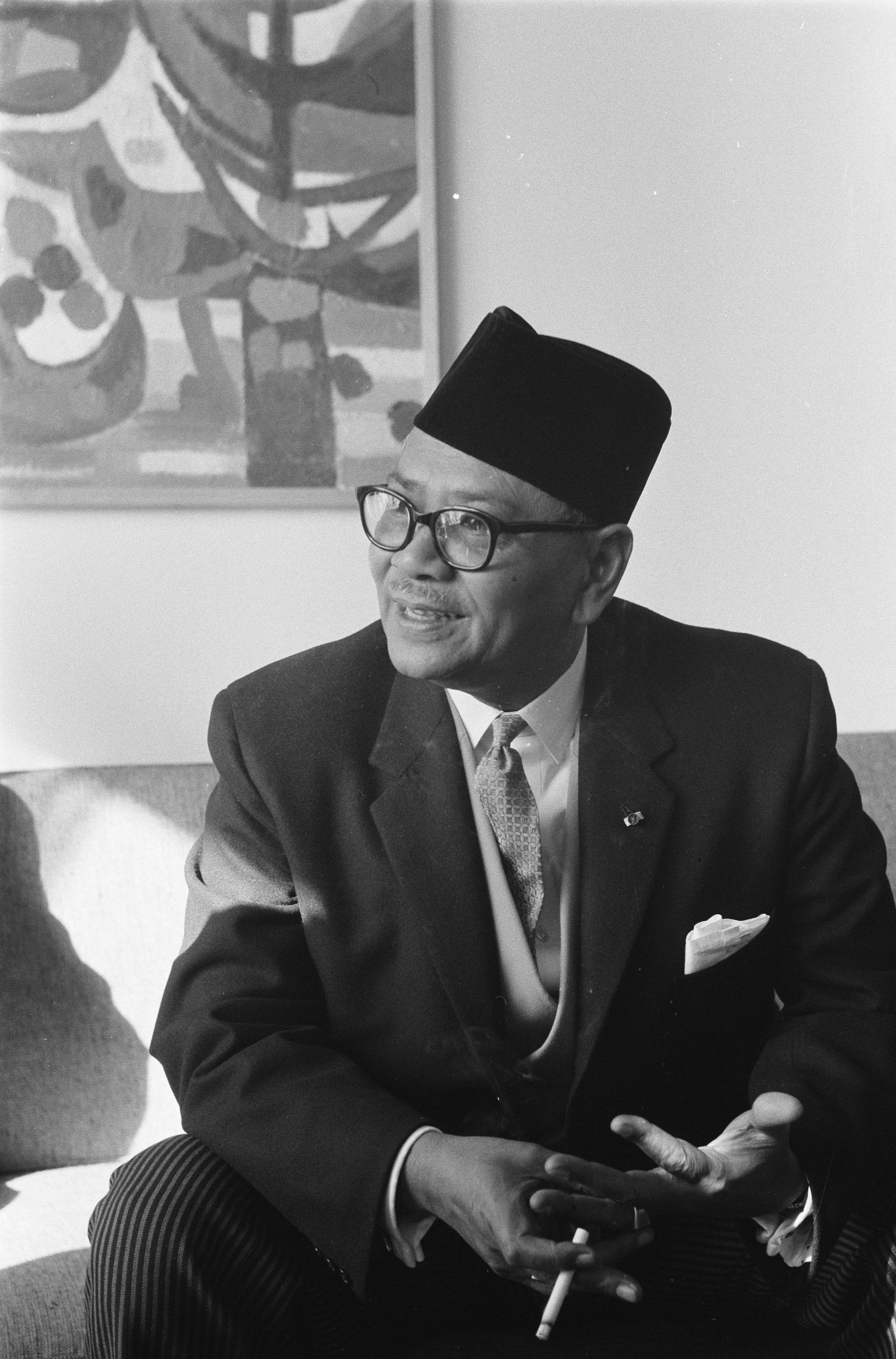
Tunku Abdul Rahman during a state visit to The Netherlands (May 1960)

Tunku was the central figure in the early political leadership of the Federation of Malaya which gained independence in 1957 and became known as Malaysia in 1963. As the country's first prime minister and concurrently its foreign minister, he played a defining role in shaping the new nation's domestic and external policies. He led the ruling Alliance coalition to decisive victories in the 1959 and 1964 general elections. His approach was moderate and consensus-based, reflecting his vision of a multiethnic Malaysia rooted in peaceful coexistence and gradual development during the broader post-colonial transition in Southeast Asia.

Among his most far-reaching initiatives was the proposal to establish a broader federation. In 1961, Tunku made a speech at the Foreign Correspondents Association of Singapore suggesting a merger of Malaya, Singapore, Sabah, Sarawak and Brunei. Although Brunei later opted out, the rest agreed, and Malaysia was formally established on 16 September 1963. While publicly supporting the federation, Tunku privately held deep reservations about Singapore's inclusion. He believed Singapore's large Chinese population would disrupt communal balance and feared the political rivalry it might bring. His concerns soon proved well founded. Singapore’s entry raised the Chinese proportion of Malaysia’s population to around 45 percent, stirring anxiety within both the United Malays National Organisation (UMNO) and the Malaysian Chinese Association (MCA). The MCA, in particular, feared that such a significant Chinese presence might provoke a backlash from the Malay majority and even prompt calls for union with neighbouring Indonesia as a means to preserve Malay political dominance.

Despite a prior understanding not to interfere in each other's political arenas, UMNO had backed the formation of the Singapore Alliance Party to counter the growing influence of Lee Kuan Yew and his People's Action Party (PAP) in Singapore. In response, the PAP contested several seats in Peninsular Malaysia during the 1964 general election and won one seat at Bangsar. This tit-for-tat campaign shattered the political truce and confirmed Tunku's fears. Convinced that Singapore's continued presence threatened national cohesion, he resolved to remove the state from the federation. On 7 August 1965, he informed the Parliament of Malaysia that it should vote in favour of expelling Singapore. The Independence of Singapore Agreement 1965 followed, and Singapore became a fully sovereign state on 9 August 1965.

Tunku's political fortunes declined after the 1969 general election, when the Alliance lost ground and racial tensions erupted into the 13 May riots in Kuala Lumpur. The federal government declared a state of emergency, and executive power was assumed by the National Operations Council (MAGERAN) under Tun Abdul Razak. Tunku remained prime minister in name but saw his authority diminished. He was increasingly sidelined by UMNO figures who believed firmer leadership was needed. On 22 September 1970, a day after his agnatic nephew Abdul Halim of Kedah was installed as King, Tunku stepped down as prime minister in favour of Abdul Razak. In June 1971, he resigned as UMNO president, yielding to rising party figures such as Mahathir Mohamad and Musa Hitam, both of whom would later hold the country's highest offices.

== Involvements in Islam ==
After making Islam the religion of the Federation in 1960, Tunku established the Islamic Welfare Organisation (PERKIM), an organization to help Muslim converts adjust to new lives as Muslims. He was President of PERKIM until a year before his death. In 1961 Malaysia hosted the first International Qur'an Recital Competition, an event that developed from Abdul Rahman's idea when he organized the first state-level competition in Kedah in 1951.

Malaysia is a founder member of the OIC. Its headquarters are in Jeddah, but it was established at the Conference of Islamic Nations held in Kuala Lumpur in 1969. Tunku was its first secretary-general since 1970.

On the occasion of his 80th birthday, he stated on 9 February 1983 edition of The Star newspaper that the "country has a multi-racial population with various beliefs. Malaysia must continue as a secular State with Islam as the official religion". In the same issue of The Star, Tunku was supported by the third Malaysian Prime Minister, Hussein Onn, who stated that the "nation can still be functional as a secular state with Islam as the official religion".

== Sports involvement ==
Tunku became vice president of the Kedah Football Association after his return from Cambridge in the late 1930s. In 1949, Tunku became president of the Selangor Football Association, and a few years later he became president of the Football Association of Malaysia, serving in the position for 20 years. During his presidency, he introduced a competition for those under-18 years old such as the Piala FAM (FAM Cup) and the Piala Rahman (Rahman Cup). Being an avid sportsman, Tunku was a firm believer that sports can be a good catalyst in bringing about greater social unity among Malaysians of various races and religions. Therefore, he supported and initiated many sports events. These included an international football tournament, the Merdeka Tournament, in 1957. In the following year, he was elected as the president of the Asian Football Confederation (AFC), a post he held until 1977.

Tunku also loved horse racing and was a regular at the Selangor Turf Club. He claimed that his lucky number was 13 and that he would win horse races that were held on the 13th of the month, especially on Friday the 13th for him. Tunku's racing interests included the champion racehorse Think Big. After it won the 1974 Melbourne Cup, Think Big's owners, Malaysian businessman Dato Tan Chin Nam, and Australian property developer Rick O'Sullivan, invited Tunku to join them as a part-owner of the horse. Think Big then won its second Melbourne Cup in 1975.

In 1977, having acquired substantial shares in The Star, a Penang-based newspaper, he became the newspaper's chairman. His columns, "Looking Back" and "As I See It", were critical of the government, and in 1987, Mahathir Mohamad banned the newspaper. This led to a split in UMNO, with Tunku himself and another former Prime Minister, Hussein Onn, setting up a new party called UMNO Malaysia, but its registration was quashed by Mahathir, who set up UMNO Baru in response. Tunku later supported Parti Melayu Semangat 46, a splinter group of UMNO led by Tengku Razaleigh Hamzah. He campaigned actively for the latter in the 1990 Malaysian general election, but was already in very poor health. The well-educated, visionary Tunku stood in contrast to Mahathir's brand of ethnic nationalism, which promised to help Malays as part of the Ketuanan Melayu ideology.

== Personal life ==
It was in Kulim that Tunku married his first wife, Meriam Chong who was the daughter of his friend, Chong Ah Yong, a Thai Chinese. A year after their marriage, Tunku's daughter Tunku Khadijah was born. A year later, a son Tunku Ahmad Nerang was born. A month after Meriam gave birth to her second child, she contracted a severe attack of malaria and died.

On Meriam's death, Tunku wrote to his lady friend in England, Violet Coulson, who ran a coffee shop that Tunku had frequented as a student. When Tunku's letter reached Violet, she dropped everything and turned up in Singapore. They were secretly married by the Kadi in the Malay mosque in Arab Street according to Muslim rites. After conversion, Violet's Muslim name was Puteh Bte Abdullah. Violet went to live in Penang because they had no approval of the Ruler or Regent. Tunku Ibrahim, the Regent, was strongly opposed to mixed marriages, but when he died unexpectedly in 1934 and was succeeded as Regent by Tunku Mahmud, the Sultan's younger brother, he consented to the marriage. Though their marriage went well, Tunku's responsibilities in the public service were all-consuming and after a separation where Violet returned to London, they have divorced amicably in 1947. He then married Sharifah Rodziah Syed Alwi Barakbah, with whom he adopted four children, Sulaiman, Mariam, Sharifah Hanizah (granddaughter), and Faridah. He also secretly married Bibi Chong and was given two children, Tunku Noor Hayati and Tunku Mastura.

Tunku's house, located at 1 Jalan Changkat Kia Peng in Kuala Lumpur, was acquired by the Government of the Philippines in 1987 and now serves as the chancery of the Philippine Embassy in Malaysia.

== Death ==
He died peacefully on 6 December 1990 at the age of 87. Among those who witnessed his last breath were Prime Minister Mahathir Mohamad with his Deputy Abdul Ghafar Baba also Chief Secretary Ahmad Sarji Abdul Hamid, and a few others. Mahathir later ordered the Chief Secretary to announce the death of Tunku. He was buried at the Langgar Royal Mausoleum in Alor Setar according to his wish signed a day before his death.

== Filmography ==
List of films
Year	Title	Role	Notes	Ref(s)
1959	Mahsuri	Scriptwriter	The film was produced by Cathay-Keris Film Productions by using the sepia colour grading.	
1968	Raja Bersiong	Scriptwriter	The film was produced by Malay Film Productions in colour.	

== Honours and awards ==
=== Honours of Malaysia ===
- Malaysia
  - Recipient of the Order of the Crown of the Realm (DMN) (1970)
- Johor
  - First Class Member of the Royal Family Order of Johor (DK I) (1961)
- Kedah
  - Member of the Royal Family Order of Kedah (DK) (1982)
  - Member of the Kedah Supreme Order of Merit (DUK) (1958)
- Kelantan
  - Recipient of the Royal Family Order of Kelantan (DK) (1970)
- Malacca
  - Knight Grand Commander of the Premier and Exalted Order of Malacca (DUNM) – Datuk Seri Utama (1985)
- Negeri Sembilan
  - Recipient of the Tuanku Munawir Installation Medal (1961)
- Perlis
  - Member of the Perlis Family Order of the Gallant Prince Syed Putra Jamalullail (DK) (1965)
- Selangor
  - First Class Member of the Royal Family Order of Selangor (DK I) (1965)
  - Knight Grand Commander of the Order of the Crown of Selangor (SPMS) – Dato' Seri (1961)
  - Gold Medal of Sultan Salahuddin Coronation Medal (1961)
- Terengganu
  - Member First Class of the Royal Family Order of Terengganu (DK I) (1964)

=== Foreign honours ===
- Australia
  - Honorary Companion of the Order of Australia (AC) (1987)
- Brunei
  - First Class of the Family Order of Brunei (DK) – Dato Laila Utama (1959)
  - Grand Commander of the Order of Seri Paduka Mahkota Brunei (SPMB) – Dato Seri Paduka (1958)
- Belgium
  - Grand Cross of the Order of the Crown (1958)
- Cambodia
  - Grand Cross of the Royal Order of Sahametrei (1962)
- Philippines
  - Grand Collar (Raja) of the Order of Sikatuna (1959)
- South Korea
  - First Class of the Order of Merit for National Foundation (1965)
- South Vietnam
  - Grand Cross of the National Order of Vietnam (1965)
- Thailand
  - Knight Grand Cross of the Order of Chula Chom Klao (1958)
- United Kingdom
  - Honorary Member of the Order of the Companions of Honour (CH) (1961)

=== Awards ===
- Malaysia
  - Tokoh Hawana (2018)

== Legacy ==
=== Buildings ===
The shape as well as the design of the Merdeka 118 tower resembles the silhouette of Tunku with his hand raised while chanting "Merdeka!" during the proclamation of the independence of Malaya on 31 August 1957.

=== Namesakes ===
Several places were named after him, including:

- Putrajaya
  - Putrajaya Sentral
- Universiti Putra Malaysia
- Universiti Tunku Abdul Rahman
- Tunku Abdul Rahman University of Management & Technology
- Tunku Abdul Rahman National Park, a marine park in Kota Kinabalu, Sabah
- Tunku Abdul Rahman Foundation
- Tunku Abdul Rahman Putra Football Cup
- KD Tunku Abdul Rahman
- Perdana Putra
- Putra Bridge
- Putra Specialist Hospital
- Putra World Trade Centre
  - LRT PWTC
  - KTM Komuter Putra
- Putrajaya Line
- Bandar Menjalara, a township in Kuala Lumpur named after Tunku's mother
- Putra World Trade Centre a convention and exhibition centre
- Masjid Putra, a mosque in Putrajaya
- Tunku Abdul Rahman Memorial Academy in Nazapur, Senbag, Bangladesh
- Jalan Tengku Abdul Rahman in Beurawe, Kuta Alam, Banda Aceh City, Aceh, Indonesia
- Jalan Tunku Abdul Rahman, a major road in Putrajaya
- Akuarium Tunku Abdul Rahman, Batu Maung, Penang
- Masjid Abdul Rahman Putra Al-Haj, a mosque in Jalan Merbok-Yan Kechil
- Jalan Tunku Abdul Rahman in George Town, Penang
- Institut Teknologi Tunku Abdul Rahman, Kuala Lumpur
- Kampung Tunku Abdul Rahman Petra, a village in Jeli, Kelantan
- Jalan Tunku Abdul Rahman, a major road in Kuching, Sarawak
- Jalan Tunku Abdul Rahman, a major road in Kota Kinabalu, Sabah
- Bukit Rahman Putra, a township in Sungai Buloh, Selangor
- Bukit Tunku in Kuala Lumpur
- Jalan Tunku Abdul Rahman in Taman Juta, Kuala Kubu Bharu
- Jalan Tunku Abdul Rahman, a road in Taman Permai, Ipoh Perak
- Jalan Tunku Abdul Rahman, a major road nearby Batu Berendam Airport, Melaka
- Jalan Tunku Abdul Rahman, a major road in Bandar Alor Setar, Kedah
- Jalan Putra in Alor Setar, Kedah
- Jalan Tunku Abdul Rahman, Taman Mekar, Krubong, Melaka
- Taman Putra Perdana in Puchong Selangor
- Putra Heights in Subang Jaya, Selangor
- Putra Glass Hall, event venue in Kampung Bukit Lancung, Shah Alam, Selangor
- Dewan Tunku Abdul Rahman Putra al-Haj, a community hall centre in Jelai, Batu Kurau, Perak
- Dewan Tunku Abdul Rahman, Kuala Terengganu
- Asrama Tunku Abdul Rahman, SMK Kuala Kubu Bharu, Selangor
- Kolej Tingkatan Enam, Tunku Abdul Rahman Putra, Sabak Bernam, Selangor
- Dewan Tunku Abdul Rahman Putra, an event venue hall in Universiti Malaysia Sarawak
- Jalan Tunku Abdul Rahman a road in Sibu, Sarawak
- Sekolah Menengah Kebangsaan Tunku Abdul Rahman in Kuching, Sarawak
- Mural Tunku Abdul Rahman, a street art honouring him in Jalan Sultan Muhammad Jiwa, Alor Setar, Kedah
- Sekolah Menengah Kebangsaan Tunku Abdul Rahman, a national secondary school in Kulai Johor
- Sekolah Menengah Teknik Tunku Abdul Rahman Putra, a national technical secondary school in Jelutong, Penang
- Sekolah Kebangsaan Tunku Abdul Rahman, a national primary school in Kuala Nerang, Kedah
- Sekolah Menengah Kebangsaan Tunku Abdul Rahman, a national secondary school in Taman Rakyat Mergong, Alor Setar, Kedah
- Sekolah Menengah Kebangsaan Tunku Abdul Rahman, a national secondary school in Nibong Tebal, Penang
- Memorial Tunku Abdul Rahman Putra Al-Haj in Alor Setar, Kedah
- Tunku Abdul Rahman Bridge in Perai, Penang
- Tunku Abdul Rahman Putra Mosque in Kuala Kedah, Kedah
- Tunku Abdul Rahman Putra Mosque in Lunas, Kedah
- Masjid Tunku Abdul Rahman, a mosque in Kampung Tepi Laut, Kuala Kedah, Kedah
- Tunku Abdul Rahman Putra Memorial, a memorial in Kuala Lumpur
- Kolej Tunku Abdul Rahman, a residential college at Universiti Malaysia Perlis, Arau, Perlis
- Kolej Tunku Abdul Rahman, a residential college at Universiti Teknologi MARA, Machang, Kelantan
- Kolej Rahman Putra, a residential college at Universiti Teknologi Malaysia, Skudai, Johor

== See also ==
- List of national founders

Political offices
New office	Prime Minister of Malaysia; 1957–1970	Succeeded by Abdul Razak
New office	Secretary General OIC; 1971–1973	Succeeded by Hassan Al-Touhami
Civic offices
Preceded by Nam Cheong Chan	President of Asian Football Confederation; 1958–1977	Succeeded by Kambiz Atabay
