= Padang Terap (federal constituency) =

Federal constituency of Kedah, Malaysia

Padang Terap (P007)
Kedah constituency

Federal constituency
- Legislature: Dewan Rakyat
- MP: Nurul Amin Hamid; PN
- Constituency created: 1974
- First contested: 1974
- Last contested: 2022

Demographics
- Population (2020): 65,986
- Electors (2023): 60,087
- Area (km²): 1,357
- Pop. density (per km²): 48.6

Padang Terap is a federal constituency in Padang Terap District, Kedah, Malaysia, that has been represented in the Dewan Rakyat since 1974.

The federal constituency was created in the 1974 redistribution and is mandated to return a single member to the Dewan Rakyat under the first past the post voting system.

== Demographics ==
https://live.chinapress.com.my/ge15/parliament/KEDAH

Ethnic breakdown of Padang Terap's electorate as of 2022
1. Malay (91.9%)
2. Other ethnicities (4.90%)
3. Chinese (1.80%)
4. Indian (1.50%)

As of 2020, Padang Terap has a population of 65,986 people.

Age breakdown of Padang Terap's electorate as of 2022
1. 18-20 (6.29%)
2. 21-29 (22.2%)
3. 30-39 (23.3%)
4. 40-49 (17.3%)
5. 50-59 (14.2%)
6. 60-69 (9.88%)
7. 70-79 (4.83%)
8. 80-89 (1.74%)
9. above 90 (0.21%)
Gender breakdown of Padang Terap's electorate as of 2022
1. Male (49.7%)
2. Female (50.3%)

== History ==
=== Polling districts ===
According to the federal gazette issued on 18 July 2023, the Padang Terap constituency is divided into 31 polling districts.

| State constituency | Polling Districts | Code | Location |
|---|---|---|---|
| Kuala Nerang (N07） | Padang Sanai | 007/07/01 | SK Padang Sanai |
| Kuala Nerang (N07） | Kuala Palas | 007/07/02 | SK Kubang Palas |
| Kuala Nerang (N07） | Gula Padang Terap | 007/07/03 | SMK Padang Terap |
| Kuala Nerang (N07） | Padang Nyior | 007/07/04 | Maktab Mahmud Padang Terap |
| Kuala Nerang (N07） | Kampung Pisang | 007/07/05 | Maktab Mahmud Padang Terap |
| Kuala Nerang (N07） | Kampung Tanjong | 007/07/06 | SK Padang Terap |
| Kuala Nerang (N07） | Tualak | 007/07/07 | SK Tualak |
| Kuala Nerang (N07） | Belimbing | 007/07/08 | SK Kuala Nerang |
| Kuala Nerang (N07） | Kampung Bendang | 007/07/09 | SK Tuanku Abdul Rahman Putra |
| Kuala Nerang (N07） | Perik | 007/07/10 | SK Perik |
| Kuala Nerang (N07） | Kurong Hitam | 007/07/11 | SK Kurong Hitam |
| Kuala Nerang (N07） | Pekan Kuala Nerang | 007/07/12 | SMK Dato' Syed Ahmad |
| Kuala Nerang (N07） | Rambutan | 007/07/13 | SK Seri Bakti |
| Kuala Nerang (N07） | Kampung Nai Teh | 007/07/14 | SK Toh Puan Sharifah Hanifah |
| Kuala Nerang (N07） | Bukit Tembaga | 007/07/15 | SK Bukit Tembaga |
| Kuala Nerang (N07） | Kampung Barokhas | 007/07/16 | SMA Al-Khairiah |
| Kuala Nerang (N07） | Nako Nambua | 007/07/17 | SK Panglima Awang |
| Pedu (N08) | Kuala Tekai | 007/08/01 | SMK Pedu |
| Pedu (N08) | Kampung Musa | 007/08/02 | SK Pedu |
| Pedu (N08) | Pedu | 007/08/03 | SK Pedu |
| Pedu (N08) | Tong Pelu | 007/08/04 | SK Datin Fatimah |
| Pedu (N08) | Kampung Mesjid | 007/08/05 | SMK Naka |
| Pedu (N08) | Belukar Luas | 007/08/06 | SK Kampong Belukar |
| Pedu (N08) | Kubang Bemban | 007/08/07 | SK Tandop Besar |
| Pedu (N08) | Tandop Besar | 007/08/08 | SK Tandop Besar |
| Pedu (N08) | Naka | 007/08/09 | SK Naka |
| Pedu (N08) | Lamdin | 007/08/10 | SK Lamdin |
| Pedu (N08) | Nami | 007/08/11 | SK Nami |
| Pedu (N08) | FELDA Lubok Merbau A | 007/08/12 | SK Lubok Merbau |
| Pedu (N08) | FELDA Lubok Merbau B | 007/08/13 | SMK Lubok Merbau |
| Pedu (N08) | Kampung Mahawangsa Padang Terap | 008/08/14 | SMA Al-Islahiah Al-Islamiah |

=== Representation history ===
Members of Parliament for Padang Terap
| Parliament | No | Years | Member | Party | Vote Share |
Constituency created from Jitra-Padang Terap and Kota Star Utara
| 4th | P005 | 1974–1978 | Ahmad Shukri Abdul Shukur (أحمد شکري عبدالشکور) | BN (PAS) | Uncontested |
| 5th | P005 | 1978–1982 | Syed Ahmad Syed Mahmud Shahabuddin (سيد أحمد سيد محمود شهاب الدين) | BN (UMNO) | 14,747; 55.14% |
| 6th | P005 | 1982–1984 | Syed Ahmad Syed Mahmud Shahabuddin (سيد أحمد سيد محمود شهاب الدين) | BN (UMNO) | 18,637; 60.19% |
| 6th | P005 | 1985–1986 | Baharom Bakar (بهاروم بكر) | BN (UMNO) | 18,262; 58.85% |
| 7th | P005 | 1986–1990 | Affifudin Omar (عَفِيفُ ٱلدِّين عُمَر) | BN (UMNO) | 18,520; 58.78% |
| 8th | P005 | 1990–1995 | Affifudin Omar (عَفِيفُ ٱلدِّين عُمَر) | BN (UMNO) | 20,697; 61.04% |
| 9th | P007 | 1995–1999 | Affifudin Omar (عَفِيفُ ٱلدِّين عُمَر) | BN (UMNO) | 11,571; 56.53% |
| 10th | P007 | 1999–2004 | Zawawi Ahmad (زواوي أحمد) | BA (PAS) | 12,218; 52.25% |
| 11th | P007 | 2004–2008 | Ghazali Ibrahim (غزالي إبراهيم) | BN (UMNO) | 14,776; 53.97% |
| 12th | P007 | 2008–2013 | Mohd Nasir Zakaria (محمد ناصر زکريا) | PR (PAS) | 15,003; 50.62% |
| 13th | P007 | 2013–2018 | Mahdzir Khalid (محاضر بن خالد) | BN (UMNO) | 20,654; 55.66% |
| 14th | P007 | 2018–2022 | Mahdzir Khalid (محاضر بن خالد) | BN (UMNO) | 16,384; 42.09% |
| 15th | P007 | 2022–present | Nurul Amin Hamid (نُورُٱلْأَمِين حَمِيْد) | PN (PAS) | 28,217; 58.03% |

=== State constituency ===
| Parliamentary constituency | State constituency | | | | | | |
| Parliamentary constituency | 1955–1959* | 1959–1974 | 1974–1986 | 1986–1995 | 1995–2004 | 2004–2018 | 2018–present |
|---|---|---|---|---|---|---|---|
| Padang Terap | | | Kuala Nerang | | | | |
| Padang Terap | | | | | Pedu | | |
| Padang Terap | | | Pokok Sena | | | | |

=== Historical boundaries ===
| State Constituency | Area | | | | |
| State Constituency | 1974 | 1984 | 1994 | 2003 | 2018 |
|---|---|---|---|---|---|
| Kuala Nerang | FELDA Lubok Merbau; Kuala Nerang; Naka; Nami; Pedu | | Kampung Labi; Kampung Mogo; Kampung Tanjung Putus; Kuala Nerang; Padang Sanai | | |
| Pedu | | | Belukar Luas; FELDA Lubok Merbau; Pedu; Naka; Nami | | |
| Pokok Sena | Bukit Payung; Kubur Panjang; Senara; Penyarom; Pokok Sena | Jabi; Kampung Leret; Kedundong; Kubang Leret; Pokok Sena | | | |

=== Current state assembly members ===
| No. | State Constituency | Member | Coalition (Party) |
|---|---|---|---|
| N07 | Kuala Nerang | Mohamad Yusoff Zakaria | PN (PAS) |
| N08 | Pedu | Mohd Radzi Md Amin | PN (PAS) |

=== Local governments & postcodes ===
| No. | State Constituency | Local Government | Postcode |
|---|---|---|---|
| N07 | Kuala Nerang | Padang Terap District Council | 06010, 06300 Kuala Nerang |
| N08 | Pedu | Padang Terap District Council | 06010, 06300 Kuala Nerang |

== Election results ==
Malaysian general election, 2022
| Party | Candidate | Votes | % | ∆% |
|---|---|---|---|---|
| PN | Nurul Amin Hamid | 28,217 | 58.03 | ▲58.03 |
| BN | Mahdzir Khalid | 17,258 | 35.49 | ▼6.60 |
| PH | Muaz Abdullah | 2,702 | 5.56 | ▲5.56 |
| PEJUANG | Razali Lebai Salleh | 452 | 0.93 | ▲0.93 |
| Total valid votes | | 48,629 | 100.00 | |
| Total rejected ballots | | 632 | | |
| Unreturned ballots | | 90 | | |
| Turnout | | 49,341 | 81.31 | ▼4.30 |
| Registered electors | | 59,806 | | |
| Majority | | 10,959 | 22.54 | ▲19.72 |
| PN gain from BN | | Swing | | ? |
Source(s) https://lom.agc.gov.my/ilims/upload/portal/akta/outputp/1753260/PUB%20606%20(2022).pdf

Malaysian general election, 2018
| Party | Candidate | Votes | % | ∆% |
|---|---|---|---|---|
| BN | Mahdzir Khalid | 16,384 | 42.09 | ▼13.57 |
| PAS | Mohd Azam Abd Aziz | 15,285 | 39.27 | ▼4.47 |
| PKR | Mohd Khairizal Khazali | 7,254 | 18.64 | ▲18.64 |
| Total valid votes | | 38,923 | 100.00 | |
| Total rejected ballots | | 854 | | |
| Unreturned ballots | | 155 | | |
| Turnout | | 39,932 | 85.61 | ▼4.72 |
| Registered electors | | 46,644 | | |
| Majority | | 1,099 | 2.82 | ▼9.15 |
| BN hold | | Swing | | |
Source(s) "His Majesty's Government Gazette - Notice of Contested Election, Parliament for the State of Kedah [P.U. (B) 233/2018]" (PDF). Attorney General's Chambers of Malaysia. 3 May 2018. "Federal Government Gazette - Results of Contested Election and Statements of the Poll after the Official Addition of Votes, Parliamentary Constituencies for the State of Kedah [P.U. (B) 307/2018]" (PDF). Attorney General's Chambers of Malaysia. 28 May 2018.

Malaysian general election, 2013
| Party | Candidate | Votes | % | ∆% |
|---|---|---|---|---|
| BN | Mahdzir Khalid | 20,654 | 55.66 | ▲6.28 |
| PAS | Mohd Nasir Zakaria | 16,212 | 43.69 | ▼6.93 |
| Independent | Muhamad Bazli Abdullah | 243 | 0.65 | ▲0.65 |
| Total valid votes | | 37,109 | 100.00 | |
| Total rejected ballots | | 691 | | |
| Unreturned ballots | | 104 | | |
| Turnout | | 37,904 | 90.33 | ▲4.33 |
| Registered electors | | 41,960 | | |
| Majority | | 4,442 | 11.97 | ▲10.73 |
| BN gain from PAS | | Swing | | ? |
Source(s) "Federal Government Gazette - Notice of Contested Election, Parliament for the State of Kedah [P.U. (B) 170/2013]" (PDF). Attorney General's Chambers of Malaysia. 26 April 2013. Archived from the original (PDF) on 2019-12-29. "Federal Government Gazette - Results of Contested Election and Statements of the Poll after the Official Addition of Votes, Parliamentary Constituencies for the State of Kedah [P.U. (B) 211/2013]" (PDF). Attorney General's Chambers of Malaysia. 22 May 2013.

Malaysian general election, 2008
| Party | Candidate | Votes | % | ∆% |
|---|---|---|---|---|
| PAS | Mohd Nasir Zakaria | 15,003 | 50.62 | ▲4.59 |
| BN | Ghazali Ibrahim | 14,634 | 49.38 | ▼4.59 |
| Total valid votes | | 29,637 | 100.00 | |
| Total rejected ballots | | 770 | | |
| Unreturned ballots | | 38 | | |
| Turnout | | 30,445 | 86.00 | ▼0.68 |
| Registered electors | | 35,403 | | |
| Majority | | 369 | 1.24 | ▼6.70 |
| PAS gain from BN | | Swing | | ? |

Malaysian general election, 2004
| Party | Candidate | Votes | % | ∆% |
|---|---|---|---|---|
| BN | Ghazali Ibrahim | 14,776 | 53.97 | ▲6.22 |
| PAS | Zawawi Ahmad | 12,604 | 46.03 | ▼6.22 |
| Total valid votes | | 27,380 | 100.00 | |
| Total rejected ballots | | 693 | | |
| Unreturned ballots | | 21 | | |
| Turnout | | 28,094 | 86.68 | ▲3.32 |
| Registered electors | | 32,411 | | |
| Majority | | 2,172 | 7.94 | ▲3.44 |
| BN gain from PAS | | Swing | | ? |

Malaysian general election, 1999
| Party | Candidate | Votes | % | ∆% |
|---|---|---|---|---|
| PAS | Zawawi Ahmad | 12,218 | 52.25 | ▲8.78 |
| BN | Othman Ismail | 11,165 | 47.75 | ▼8.78 |
| Total valid votes | | 23,383 | 100.00 | |
| Total rejected ballots | | 480 | | |
| Unreturned ballots | | 294 | | |
| Turnout | | 24,157 | 83.36 | ▲5.33 |
| Registered electors | | 28,979 | | |
| Majority | | 1,053 | 4.50 | ▼8.56 |
| PAS gain from BN | | Swing | | ? |

Malaysian general election, 1995
| Party | Candidate | Votes | % | ∆% |
|---|---|---|---|---|
| BN | Affifudin Omar | 11,571 | 56.53 | ▼4.51 |
| PAS | Mustapha Kamal Shahrom | 8,898 | 43.47 | ▲43.47 |
| Total valid votes | | 20,469 | 100.00 | |
| Total rejected ballots | | 811 | | |
| Unreturned ballots | | 17 | | |
| Turnout | | 21,297 | 78.03 | ▼0.68 |
| Registered electors | | 27,293 | | |
| Majority | | 2,673 | 13.06 | ▼9.02 |
| BN hold | | Swing | | |

Malaysian general election, 1990
| Party | Candidate | Votes | % | ∆% |
|---|---|---|---|---|
| BN | Affifudin Omar | 20,697 | 61.04 | ▲2.26 |
| S46 | Baharom Bakar | 13,208 | 38.96 | ▲38.96 |
| Total valid votes | | 33,905 | 100.00 | |
| Total rejected ballots | | 1,482 | | |
| Unreturned ballots | | 0 | | |
| Turnout | | 35,387 | 78.71 | ▼0.02 |
| Registered electors | | 44,958 | | |
| Majority | | 7,489 | 22.08 | ▲4.52 |
| BN hold | | Swing | | |

Malaysian general election, 1986
| Party | Candidate | Votes | % | ∆% |
|---|---|---|---|---|
| BN | Affifudin Omar | 18,520 | 58.78 | ▼0.07 |
| PAS | Mahmud Ahmad | 12,985 | 41.22 | ▲0.75 |
| Total valid votes | | 31,505 | 100.00 | |
| Total rejected ballots | | 683 | | |
| Unreturned ballots | | 0 | | |
| Turnout | | 32,188 | 78.73 | ▼0.13 |
| Registered electors | | 40,884 | | |
| Majority | | 5,535 | 17.56 | ▼0.82 |
| BN hold | | Swing | | |

Malaysian general by-election, 19 January 1985 Upon the resignation of incumbent, Syed Ahmad Syed Mahmud Shahabuddin
| Party | Candidate | Votes | % | ∆% |
|---|---|---|---|---|
| BN | Baharom Bakar | 18,262 | 58.85 | ▼1.34 |
| PAS | Halim Arshat | 12,560 | 40.47 | ▲0.66 |
| Independent | Choong Seang Hai | 118 | 0.38 | ▲0.38 |
| Independent | Khalid Abdullah | 93 | 0.30 | ▲0.30 |
| Total valid votes | | 31,033 | 100.00 | |
| Total rejected ballots | | 369 | | |
| Unreturned ballots | | 0 | | |
| Turnout | | 31,402 | 78.86 | ▼3.68 |
| Registered electors | | 39,818 | | |
| Majority | | 5,702 | 18.38 | ▼2.00 |
| BN hold | | Swing | | |

Malaysian general election, 1982
| Party | Candidate | Votes | % | ∆% |
|---|---|---|---|---|
| BN | Syed Ahmad Syed Mahmud Shahabuddin | 18,637 | 60.19 | ▲5.05 |
| PAS | Sudin Wahab | 12,329 | 39.81 | ▼5.05 |
| Total valid votes | | 30,966 | 100.00 | |
| Total rejected ballots | | 1,085 | | |
| Unreturned ballots | | 0 | | |
| Turnout | | 32,051 | 82.54 | ▲0.00 |
| Registered electors | | 38,831 | | |
| Majority | | 6,308 | 20.38 | ▲10.10 |
| BN hold | | Swing | | |

Malaysian general election, 1978
| Party | Candidate | Votes | % | ∆% |
|---|---|---|---|---|
| BN | Syed Ahmad Syed Mahmud Shahabuddin | 14,747 | 55.14 | ▲55.14 |
| PAS | Mohamad Asri Muda | 12,000 | 44.86 | ▲44.86 |
| Total valid votes | | 26,747 | 100.00 | |
| Total rejected ballots | | 508 | | |
| Unreturned ballots | | 0 | | |
| Turnout | | 27,255 | 82.54 | |
| Registered electors | | 33,019 | | |
| Majority | | 2,747 | 10.28 | |
| BN hold | | Swing | | |

Malaysian general election, 1974
| Party | Candidate | Votes | % |
|---|---|---|---|
On the nomination day, Ahmad Shukri Abdul Shukur won uncontested.
| BN | Ahmad Shukri Abdul Shukur | | |
| Total valid votes | | | 100.00 |
| Total rejected ballots | | | |
| Unreturned ballots | | | |
| Turnout | | | |
| Registered electors | | 28,348 | |
| Majority | | | |
This was a new constituency created.
