= Sharifah Rodziah Barakbah =

Spouse of the Prime Minister of Malaysia (1920–2000)

Yang Amat Berbahagia Tun Dato' Seri Sharifah Rodziah Syed Alwi Barakbah SMN SPMT
- شريفة راضية برقبة

Spouse of the Prime Minister of Malaysia
- In role 31 August 1957 – 22 September 1970
- Monarchs: Abdul Rahman; Hisamuddin; Putra; Ismail Nasiruddin; Abdul Halim
- Prime Minister: Tunku Abdul Rahman
- Succeeded by: Rahah Noah

Personal details
- Born: 1920 Alor Setar, Kedah, Unfederated Malay States
- Died: 12 March 2000 (aged 79–80) Penang, Malaysia
- Resting place: Kedah Royal Mausoleum
- Spouse: Tunku Abdul Rahman (m. 1939; died 1990)
- Relations: Mahawangsa dynasty (by marriage)
- Children: 3 (adopted)

Sharifah Rodziah binti Syed Alwi Barakbah (Jawi: شريفة راضية بنت سيد علوي برقبة; 1920 – 12 March 2000) was the third wife of Tunku Abdul Rahman Putra Al-Haj, the founding father and first Prime Minister of Malaysia.

== Early life ==
Born in 1920, Sharifah Rodziah was of Hadhrami-Malay descent; her Arab ancestors had migrated from Hadhramaut and settled in Kedah for several generations. Being of the Barakbah clan, she was related to Syed Sheh Hassan Barakbah, the former Yang di-Pertua Negeri (Governor) of Penang.

== Marriage ==
Sharifah Rodziah was actually the younger sister of Tunku's university mate in England, Syed Omar Barakbah. Tunku and Sharifah Rodziah married in 1939 when he returned to Kedah from England upon hearing news that World War II was about to erupt in Europe.

She became Tunku's third wife after the death of Meriam Chong and his divorce from Violet Coulson. However, the marriage did not result in any offspring. Sharifah Rodziah became a loving stepmother to Tunku's children from his first marriage to Meriam Chong. They later adopted three children, Sulaiman, Mariam and Faridah.

Tunku Abdul Rahman's eldest daughter, Tunku Khadijah said in an interview to The Star that Sharifah Rodziah "loved my father dearly to a fault. She did not want to share him with anyone else".

== Influence ==
Sharifah Rodziah played an important role in rallying political support for her husband during Malaysia's tumultuous formative years.

== Death ==
She died due to pneumonia, in Penang, on 12 March 2000 at the age of 80 and was buried next to her husband's grave, Tunku Abdul Rahman Putra Al-Haj at Kedah Royal Mausoleum in Langgar, Kedah.

== Honours ==
=== Honours of Malaysia ===
- Malaysia
  - Grand Commander of the Order of the Defender of the Realm (SMN) – Tun (1970)
- Terengganu
  - Knight Grand Commander of the Order of the Crown of Terengganu (SPMT) – Dato' Seri (1964)

=== Places named after her ===
- SMK Tun Sharifah Rodziah in Alor Setar, Kedah
- SMK Agama Sharifah Rodziah in Telok Mas, Melaka
- Tun Sharifah Rodziah Sea Base, located at Eastern Sabah Security Zone (ESSZONE), Sabah
- Piala Tun Sharifah Rodziah

== See also ==
- Spouse of the Prime Minister of Malaysia

== Sources ==
- Asiaweek.com, 24 March 2000.
- Putera Negara; 1987, Firma Publishing, Aziz Zarina Ahmad.
