= Mohd Nasir Zakaria =

Malaysian politician

Mohd Nasir Zakaria AMK
- محمد ناصر زکريا

Member of the Malaysian Parliament for Padang Terap, Kedah
- In office 8 March 2008 – 5 May 2013
- Preceded by: Ghazali Ibrahim (BN–UMNO)
- Succeeded by: Mahdzir Khalid (BN–UMNO)
- Majority: 369 (2008)

Personal details
- Born: 9 February 1976 (age 50) Kedah, Malaysia
- Party: Pan-Malaysian Islamic Party (PAS) (until 2016); Parti Amanah Negara (AMANAH) (since 2016)
- Other political affiliations: Pakatan Rakyat (PR); Pakatan Harapan (PH)
- Occupation: Politician
- Website: nasirzakaria.blogspot.com

Mohd Nasir bin Zakaria (born 9 February 1976) is a Malaysian politician. From 2008 to 2013 he was the Member of the Parliament of Malaysia for the Padang Terap constituency in Kedah. He is a member of the opposition Pan-Malaysian Islamic Party (PAS).

Mohd Nasir was elected to Parliament in the 2008 election, defeating the incumbent UMNO member Ghazali Ibrahim by 369 votes. Prior to his election, he was a businessman. He lost his seat in the 2013 election to the former Menteri Besar (Chief Minister) of Kedah, Mahdzir Khalid, who had served for two terms as the state assemblyman for the seat of Pedu, which fell within Padang Terap's borders.

== Election results ==
Parliament of Malaysia
Year	Constituency	Candidate	Votes	Pct	Opponent(s)	Votes	Pct	Ballots cast	Majority	Turnout
2008	P007 Padang Terap	Mohd Nasir Zakaria (PAS)	15,003	50.62%	Ghazali Ibrahim (UMNO)	14,634	49.38%	30,445	369	86.00%
2013	P007 Padang Terap	Mohd Nasir Zakaria (PAS)	16,212	43.69%	Mahdzir Khalid (UMNO)	20,654	55.66%	37,904	4,442	90.33%
2013	P007 Padang Terap	Mohd Nasir Zakaria (PAS)	16,212	43.69%	Muhamad Bazli Abdullah (IND)	243	0.65%	37,904	4,442	90.33%

== Honours ==
- Kedah
  - Member of the Order of the Crown of Kedah (AMK) (2011)
