= Violet Coulson =

Wife of Tunku Abdul Rahman

Violet Coulson was the second wife of Tunku Abdul Rahman, the first Prime Minister of Malaysia.

== Friendship ==
Tunku had met Coulson in 1927, during his second year as a law student in London. She was an attractive lady who managed a restaurant where many Malayan students had their meals. When Tunku got tired of his law studies, he and Coulson would sometimes go dancing together. In 1933, while the Tunku was still married to his first wife Meriam Chong, he brought Violet to visit Medan, Indonesia.

When news of Meriam's death reached Coulson she handed over the management of her restaurant in London and sailed for Singapore without the Tunku's knowledge. Upon arriving in Singapore, she wrote to the Tunku informing him of her arrival. Tunku immediately took the train to Singapore and met Coulson at her hotel. Together they talked about old times and their long friendship.

== Marriage ==
Tunku secretly married Coulson in Geylang Serai, Singapore, witnessed by Syed Ahmad al-Sagoff, according to Islamic rites. After their marriage, Coulson stayed in Penang, and Tunku stayed alone in Kuala Nerang, where he was District Officer, in order to avoid public criticism.

There was a law in Kedah which forbade members of the royal family to marry non-Malays without the prior approval of the Sultan of Kedah or the Regent. Tunku Ibrahim, the Regent, was known to be strongly opposed to mixed marriages, but he died unexpectedly in 1934 and was succeeded as Regent by Tunku Mahmud, the Sultan's younger brother, who was more broadminded and gave consent to the marriage. This enabled Coulson to move to Kuala Nerang to be with her husband, but the Secretary to the Government showed his disapproval by transferring the Tunku to the isolated post of District Officer of Langkawi.

S.W Jones M.C.S, who was the acting British Advisor in Kedah, visited Langkawi and was so impressed by the initiative and improvements shown by the Tunku that he persuaded the Council of State to transfer Tunku and to promote him to the post of District Officer of Sungai Petani, the second most important district in Kedah.

== Separation and divorce ==
Langkawi has been a Shangri-La for Coulson, but Sungai Petani was a busy town and the centre of a large district, in which Tunku's every moment was occupied. Coulson was no longer happy and Tunku had little time to spare. Like other ex-patriates, Coulson often socialised with the British officers' wives. Tunku and Coulson argued often, but in 1937 Coulson sarcastically teased that Malay women were uncivilized and stupid, provoking Tunku's fury. Coulson decided to return to London in 1937.

In 1938, due to a disagreement with the British-led Kedah state government, Tunku applied for a long leave and left for England to study Law for the third time. He was reunited with Coulson and their relationship improved although they did not divorce officially. Tunku returned to Kedah in 1939 due to the war in Europe. According to official records, Tunku was ordered to divorce Coulson by the Regent of Kedah. The couple divorced officially in 1946.

Coulson then resumed the management of her restaurant in London. She later married an American who served in the United States Armed Forces as Judge Advocate in England.

== See also ==
- Lady Meriam
