= Mahdzir Khalid =

Malaysian politician and teacher

Yang Berbahagia Dato' Seri Diraja Mahdzir Khalid SHMS SSDK DPMP JP
- محاضر خالد

Minister of Rural Development
- In office 30 August 2021 – 24 November 2022
- Monarch: Abdullah
- Prime Minister: Ismail Sabri Yaakob
- Deputy: Abdul Rahman Mohamad; Hasbi Habibollah
- Preceded by: Abdul Latiff Ahmad
- Succeeded by: Ahmad Zahid Hamidi (Minister of Rural and Regional Development)
- Constituency: Padang Terap

Minister of Education
- In office 29 July 2015 – 9 May 2018
- Monarchs: Abdul Halim (2015–2016); Muhammad V (2016–2018)
- Prime Minister: Najib Razak
- Deputy: P. Kamalanathan; Chong Sin Woon
- Preceded by: Muhyiddin Yassin
- Succeeded by: Maszlee Malik
- Constituency: Padang Terap

Deputy Minister of Energy, Green Technology and Water
- In office 16 May 2013 – 29 July 2015
- Monarch: Abdul Halim
- Prime Minister: Najib Razak
- Minister: Maximus Ongkili
- Preceded by: Noriah Kasnon
- Succeeded by: James Dawos Mamit
- Constituency: Padang Terap

9th Menteri Besar of Kedah
- In office 29 December 2005 – 9 March 2008
- Monarch: Abdul Halim
- Preceded by: Syed Razak Syed Zain Barakbah
- Succeeded by: Azizan Abdul Razak
- Constituency: Pedu

Member of the Kedah State Executive Council (Agriculture, Rural Development and Co-operatives)
- In office 28 March 2004 – 29 December 2005
- Monarch: Abdul Halim
- Menteri Besar: Syed Razak Syed Zain Barakbah
- Preceded by: Zainol Md Isa (Agriculture, Rural Development); Syed Razak Syed Zain Barakbah (Co-operatives)
- Succeeded by: Himself (Agriculture); Shuib Saedin (Rural Development, Co-operatives)
- Constituency: Pedu

Chairman of the Tenaga Nasional Berhad
- In office 12 May 2020 – 1 October 2021
- Minister: Shamsul Anuar Nasarah (2020–3 August 2021); Takiyuddin Hassan (30 August–1 October 2021)
- Chief Executive Officer: Amir Hamzah Azizan (2020–1 March 2021); Baharin Din (1 March–1 October 2021)
- Preceded by: Ahmad Badri Mohd Zahir
- Succeeded by: Hasan Arifin

Member of the Malaysian Parliament for Padang Terap
- In office 5 May 2013 – 19 November 2022
- Preceded by: Mohd Nasir Zakaria (PR–PAS)
- Succeeded by: Nurul Amin Hamid (PN–PAS)
- Majority: 4,442 (2013); 1,099 (2018)

Member of the Kedah State Legislative Assembly for Pedu
- In office 21 March 2004 – 5 May 2013
- Preceded by: Wan Jaafar Wan Ahmad (BA–PAS)
- Succeeded by: Kama Noriah Ibrahim (BN–UMNO)
- Majority: 1,899 (2004); 2,733 (2008)

State Chairman of the United Malays National Organisation of Kedah
- Incumbent
- Assumed office 22 March 2023
- President: Ahmad Zahid Hamidi
- Deputy: Abdul Azeez Abdul Rahim
- Preceded by: Jamil Khir Baharom

Vice President of the United Malays National Organisation
- In office 30 June 2018 – 18 March 2023 Serving with Ismail Sabri Yaakob & Mohamed Khaled Nordin
- President: Ahmad Zahid Hamidi (2018, 2019–2023); Mohamad Hasan (Acting) (2018–2019)
- Preceded by: Shafie Apdal (2009–2016)
- Succeeded by: Johari Abdul Ghani

Faction represented in Dewan Rakyat
- 2013–2022: Barisan Nasional

Faction represented in Kedah State Legislative Assembly
- 2004–2013: Barisan Nasional

Personal details
- Born: Mahdzir bin Khalid; 15 December 1960 (age 65) Kampung Atong, Pokok Sena, Kedah, Federation of Malaya (now Malaysia)
- Citizenship: Malaysian
- Party: United Malays National Organisation (UMNO)
- Other political affiliations: Barisan Nasional (BN)
- Spouse: Noraini Abdullah
- Children: 4
- Occupation: Politician
- Profession: Teacher
- Mahdzir Khalid on Parliament of Malaysia

Mahdzir bin Khalid (Jawi: محاضر بن خالد; born 15 December 1960) is a Malaysian politician and teacher who served as the Minister of Rural Development in the Barisan Nasional (BN) administration under former Prime Minister Ismail Sabri Yaakob from August 2021 to the collapse of BN administration in November 2022, Minister of Education, Deputy Minister of Energy, Green Technology and Water in the BN administration under former Prime Minister Najib Razak and former Minister Maximus Ongkili from May 2013 to the collapse of the BN administration in May 2018, Chairman of the Tenaga Nasional Berhad (TNB) from May 2020 to October 2021, Member of Parliament (MP) for Padang Terap from May 2013 to November 2022, the 9th Menteri Besar of Kedah from December 2005 to March 2008, Member of the Kedah State Executive Council (EXCO) from March 2004 to his promotion to Menteri Besar in December 2005 and Member of the Kedah State Legislative Assembly (MLA) for Pedu from March 2004 to May 2013. He is a Member of the Supreme Council and Division Chief of Padang Terap of the United Malays National Organisation (UMNO), a component party of the BN coalition. He has also served as the State Chairman of UMNO of Kedah since March 2023. He also served as the Vice President of UMNO from June 2018 to his defeat in the party elections in March 2023.

== Political career ==
Mahdzir started his political career as a staffer and in 1999 became the political secretary to Deputy Prime Minister Abdullah Ahmad Badawi. In 2004 he was elected to the Kedah State Legislative Assembly for the rural seat of Pedu. In December 2005 he became the state's Chief Minister after his predecessor, Syed Razak Syed Zain Barakbah, resigned because of ill health. Mahdzir had been acting in the position since July 2005.

Mahdzir's tenure as Menteri Besar came to an end after his BN Kedah state government was defeated in the 2008 election by the Pakatan Rakyat (PR) opposition coalition led by the Pan-Malaysian Islamic Party (PAS). Mahdzir became Barisan Nasional's opposition leader in the state assembly before moving to federal parliament in the 2013 election, winning the seat of Padang Terap from PAS. After the election he was appointed Deputy Minister for Energy, Green Technology and Water in the government of Prime Minister Najib Razak.

Over a period of about 17 months between 2015 and 2017, as Minister of Education, Mahdzir was pressured to award a contract for the provision of electricity to rural Sarawak schools to Jepak Holdings.

== Jepak Holdings ==
In late 2015, Saidi Bin Abang Samsudin and Rayyan Radzwill bin Abdullah proposed to the Ministry of Education that it award their company, Jepak Holdings Sdn Bhd, a contract to replace other contractors for the provision of maintenance of diesel electric generators at rural and interior Sarawak schools and install a hybrid solar voltaic system for RM1.25 billion.

As Minister of Education, Mahdzir did not favour the proposal as the ministry's technical experts doubted Jepak's expertise and the ministry had already planned to connect some of the schools to the electricity grid. Saidi and Rayyan then sought the assistance of Rosmah Mansor, wife of Prime Minister Najib Razak, to effect the contract. Saidi and Rayyan agreed to pay Rosmah 15% of the contract sum, or RM187.5 million, for her help. In December 2016, Rosmah called Mahdzir to urge him to award the contract. Eventually, the ministry signed a contract with Jepak in June 2017. In September 2022, Rosmah was convicted in the High Court of Malaya of bribery in relation to the Jepak contract.

== Election results ==
Kedah State Legislative Assembly
Year	Constituency	Candidate	Votes	Pct	Opponent(s)	Votes	Pct	Ballots cast	Majority	Turnout
2004	N08 Pedu	Mahdzir Khalid (UMNO)	7,684	56.26%	Wan Jaafar Wan Ahmad (PAS)	5,785	42.36%	13,657	1,899	87.29%
2008	N08 Pedu	Mahdzir Khalid (UMNO)	8,780	57.76%	Zamri Yusuf (PKR)	6,047	39.78%	15,200	2,733	87.53%
2023	N08 Pedu	Mahdzir Khalid (UMNO)	8,024	35.79%	Mohd Radzi Md Amin (PAS)	14,397	64.21%	22,581	6,373	78.94%

Parliament of Malaysia
Year	Constituency	Candidate	Votes	Pct	Opponent(s)	Votes	Pct	Ballots cast	Majority	Turnout
2013	P007 Padang Terap	Mahdzir Khalid (UMNO)	20,654	55.66%	Mohd Nasir Zakaria (PAS)	16,202	43.69%	37,904	4,442	90.33%
2018	P007 Padang Terap	Mahdzir Khalid (UMNO)	16,384	42.09%	Khairizal Khazali (AMANAH)	7,254	18.64%	39,932	1,099	85.61%
2018	P007 Padang Terap	Mahdzir Khalid (UMNO)	16,384	42.09%	Mohd Azam Abd Aziz (PAS)	15,285	39.27%	39,932	1,099	85.61%
2022	P007 Padang Terap	Mahdzir Khalid (UMNO)	17,258	35.49%	Nurul Amin Hamid (PAS)	28,217	58.03%	49,341	10,959	81.31%
2022	P007 Padang Terap	Mahdzir Khalid (UMNO)	17,258	35.49%	Muaz Abdullah (AMANAH)	2,702	5.56%	49,341	10,959	81.31%
2022	P007 Padang Terap	Mahdzir Khalid (UMNO)	17,258	35.49%	Razali Lebai Salleh (PEJUANG)	452	0.93%	49,341	10,959	81.31%

== Honours ==
- Kedah
  - Justice of the Peace of Kedah (JP) (1986)
  - Knight Grand Companion of the Order of Loyalty to the Royal House of Kedah (SSDK) – Dato' Seri (2006)
  - Justice of the Peace of Kedah (JP) (2007)
  - Grand Commander of the Order of Loyalty to Sultan Abdul Halim Mu'adzam Shah (SHMS) – Dato' Seri Diraja (2008)
  - Dato' Seri Mahawangsa (2011)
- Perak
  - Knight Commander of the Order of the Perak State Crown (DPMP) – Dato' (2003)

Political offices
Preceded by Syed Razak Syed Zain Barakbah	Menteri Besar of Kedah; 2005–2008	Succeeded by Azizan Abdul Razak
