= Pedu Lake =

- Tasik Pedu (Malay)
- Location within Malaysia
- Location: Padang Terap, Kedah, Malaysia
- Coordinates: 6.247109°N 100.81295°E
- Type: Artificial lake
- Basin countries: Malaysia
- Surface area: 75 km^{2} (29 sq mi)

Pedu Lake (Malay: Tasik Pedu) is a man-made lake located in Padang Terap District, Kedah, Malaysia. It covers an area of 75 km².

== See also ==
- Geography of Malaysia
