= Lady Meriam =

Malaysian noblewoman

Lady Meriam Chong Abdullah, also known as Chong Ah Mei or Mariam Abdullah (died 1934), was the first wife of Tunku Abdul Rahman, who later became the founding father and the first Prime Minister of Malaysia.

== Early life ==
Lady Meriam was the daughter of a tin mining tycoon, Chong Ah Yong, who was also a friend of the Tunku. She was of Thai Chinese heritage but converted to Islam upon marriage to Tunku in 1933.

== Marriage ==
Tunku Abdul Rahman met Meriam in Kulim, where he had just been transferred as Assistant District Officer. Some historical reports state that Meriam was personally chosen by Tunku's mother, Che Menjalara who was of Thai descent herself. According to reports, Che Menjalara forced Tunku to marry her, despite Tunku's refusal to do so. However, in the end they were married according to royal customs at the Kedah palace. Other reports state that they were married by the local Kadi in Tunku's government quarters.

Soon after Meriam's conversion to Islam she learnt to pray and when the fasting month began, she persuaded Tunku to do so too. Their marriage resulted in two children, Tunku Khadijah and Tunku Ahmad Nerang.

In 1935, Tunku was promoted to be District Officer of Padang Terap. The post of District Officer Padang Terap was an unpopular one. Kuala Nerang was notorious for the prevalence of malaria. It was here that Meriam gave birth to their second child, Tunku Ahmad Nerang.

== Death ==
A month after Meriam gave birth to her second child, she contracted a severe attack of malaria. Although Tunku gave her the best remedies that he could obtain from Penang, Meriam made little progress. A visiting English doctor from Alor Setar mistakenly gave her an injection of undiluted quinine that killed her instantly. As it was a tragic misadventure, Tunku made no attempt to lodge an official report. Instead he wrote to the State Secretariat, asking that funds be made available to drain the swamp and to rid Kuala Nerang of the main breeding place of the carriers of malaria. When he asked before, funds were denied but this time the money was provided and the work was carried out under Tunku's supervision.
