= Ahmad Shukri Abdul Shukur =

Malaysian politician

- أحمد شکري عبدالشکور

Member of the Malaysian Parliament for Padang Terap
- In office 1974–1978
- Preceded by: New constituency
- Succeeded by: Syed Ahmad Syed Mahmud Shahabuddin

Member of the Kedah State Legislative Assembly for Sala
- In office 1969–1974
- Preceded by: Arshad Tunku Ismail
- Succeeded by: Yahya Junid

Personal details
- Party: PAS (till 1983); Parti Hizbul Muslimin Malaysia (since 1983)

Ahmad Shukri bin Abdul Shukur is a Malaysian politician that has participated in several general election in Malaysia. He was the Member of Parliament for Padang Terap from 1974 to 1978 and the Member of Kedah State Legislative Assembly for Sala from 1969 to 1974.

== Political career ==
He was the member of Kedah State Legislative Assembly for Sala from 1969 to 1974 after winning the 1969 Malaysian general election representing Malaysian Islamic Party. In 1964 Malaysian general election, he lost to Mahathir Mohamad, representing UMNO for the Kota Star Selatan parliamentary seat. He was also a member of Dewan Rakyat after winning the Padang Terap parliamentary seat in 1974 Malaysian general election, representing PAS, which used the logo of Barisan Nasional.

In July 1983, after PAS had failed to win back Kelantan, Ahmad Shukri followed the former PAS president, Asri Muda to establish a new party, Parti Hizbul Muslimin Malaysia. He was appointed as the Deputy President, the Spokesperson of Kedah and the Chairman of the Disciplinary Committee of the party.

== See also ==
- Parti Hizbul Muslimin Malaysia
- Padang Terap (federal constituency)
