= Nurul Amin Hamid =

Malaysian politician

Yang Berhormat Tuan Nurul Amin Hamid MP
- نُورُٱلْأَمِين حَمِيْد

Member of the Malaysian Parliament for Padang Terap
- Incumbent
- Assumed office 19 November 2022
- Preceded by: Mahdzir Khalid (BN–UMNO)
- Majority: 10,959 (2022)

Personal details
- Born: 15 August 1983 (age 43) Jeneri, Kedah, Malaysia
- Party: Malaysian Islamic Party (PAS)
- Other political affiliations: Perikatan Nasional (PN)
- Spouse: Bushra Mazani
- Children: 4
- Education: Al Azhar University; Sultan Abdul Halim Mu'adzam Shah International Islamic University
- Occupation: Politician

Nurul Amin bin Hamid is a Malaysian politician who has served as the Member of Parliament (MP) for Padang Terap since November 2022. He is a member of the Malaysian Islamic Party (PAS), a component party of the Perikatan Nasional (PN) coalition.

== Election results ==
Parliament of Malaysia
Year	Constituency	Candidate	Votes	Pct	Opponent(s)	Votes	Pct	Ballots cast	Majority	Turnout
2022	P007 Padang Terap	Nurul Amin Hamid (PAS)	28,217	58.03%	Mahdzir Khalid (UMNO)	17,258	35.49%	49,341	10,959	81.31%
2022	P007 Padang Terap	Nurul Amin Hamid (PAS)	28,217	58.03%	Muaz Abdullah (AMANAH)	2,702	5.56%	49,341	10,959	81.31%
2022	P007 Padang Terap	Nurul Amin Hamid (PAS)	28,217	58.03%	Razali Lebai Salleh (PEJUANG)	452	0.93%	49,341	10,959	81.31%

== Honours ==
=== Honours of Malaysia ===
- Malaysia
  - Recipient of the 17th Yang di-Pertuan Agong Installation Medal (2024)

== See also ==
- Members of the Dewan Rakyat, 15th Malaysian Parliament
