= Treaty of London (1956) =

1956 treaty establishing Malaya

The Treaty of London was signed on 8 February 1956 to set up the independent Federation of Malaya, which achieved its independence on 31 August 1957.

== See also ==
- Reid Commission
- Merdeka Day
