= Mohd Radzi Md Amin =

Malaysian politicians

Yang Berhormat Tuan Mohd Radzi Md Amin MLA
- محمد رضي محمد أمين

Member of the Kedah State Legislative Assembly for Pedu
- Incumbent
- Assumed office 9 May 2018
- Preceded by: Kama Noriah Ibrahim (BN–UMNO)
- Majority: 670 (2018); 6,373 (2023)

Personal details
- Born: 1 May 1973 (age 53) Malaysia
- Party: Malaysian Islamic Party (PAS)
- Other political affiliations: Perikatan Nasional (PN)
- Occupation: Politician

Mohd Radzi bin Md Amin (born 1 May 1973) is a Malaysian politician who served as Member of the Kedah State Legislative Assembly (MLA) for Pedu since May 2018. He is a member of Malaysian Islamic Party (PAS), a component party of Perikatan Nasional (PN) coalitions.

== Election results ==
Kedah State Legislative Assembly
Year	Constituency	Candidate	Votes	Pct	Opponent(s)	Votes	Pct	Ballots cast	Majority	Turnout
2018	N08 Pedu	Mohd Radzi Md Amin (PAS)	8,164	43.13%	Kama Noriah Ibrahim (UMNO)	7,494	39.59%	19,495	670	86.50%
2018	N08 Pedu	Mohd Radzi Md Amin (PAS)	8,164	43.13%	Hashim Idris (PKR)	3,272	17.28%	19,495	670	86.50%
2023	N08 Pedu	Mohd Radzi Md Amin (PAS)	14,397	64.21%	Mahdzir Khalid (UMNO)	8,024	35.79%	22,595	6,373	78.99%
