= Pedu =

Pedu (N08)
Kedah constituency

State constituency
- Legislature: Kedah State Legislative Assembly
MLA
Mohd Radzi Md Amin
PN
- Constituency created: 1994
- First contested: 1995
- Last contested: 2023

Demographics
- Electors (2023): 28,606

Pedu is a state constituency in Kedah, Malaysia, that has been represented in the Kedah State Legislative Assembly.

== Demographics ==
As of 2020, Pedu has a population of 31,561 people.

Ethnic breakdown of Pedu's electorate as of 2023
1. Malay (86.0%)
2. Other ethnicities (12.9%)
3. Chinese (1.09%)
4. Indian (0.09%)

== History ==
=== Polling districts ===
According to the gazette issued on 30 March 2018, the Pedu constituency has a total of 14 polling districts.

State constituency	Polling districts	Code	Location
Pedu (N08)	Kuala Tekai	007/08/01	SMK Pedu
Pedu (N08)	Kampung Musa	007/08/02	Pusat Kokurikulum Daerah Padang Terap
Pedu (N08)	Pedu	007/08/03	SK Pedu
Pedu (N08)	Tong Pelu	007/08/04	SK Datin Fatimah
Pedu (N08)	Kampung Mesjid	007/08/05	SMK Naka
Pedu (N08)	Belukar Luas	007/08/06	SK Kampong Belukar
Pedu (N08)	Kubang Bemban	007/08/07	SK Tandop Besar
Pedu (N08)	Tandop Besar	007/08/08	SK Tandop Besar
Pedu (N08)	Naka	007/08/09	SK Naka
Pedu (N08)	Lamdin	007/08/10	SK Lamdin
Pedu (N08)	Nami	007/08/11	SK Nami
Pedu (N08)	FELDA Lubok Merbau A	007/08/12	SK Lubok Merbau
Pedu (N08)	FELDA Lubok Merbau	007/08/13	SMK Lubok Merbau
Pedu (N08)	Kampung Mahawangsa Padang Terap	008/08/14	SMK Lubok Merbau

=== Representation history ===
Kedah State Legislative Assemblyman for Pedu
Assembly	No	Years	Member	Party
Constituency created from Kuala Nerang
9th	N08	1995–1999	Ghazali Ibrahim	BN (UMNO)
10th	N08	1999–2004	Wan Jaafar Wan Ahmad	PAS
11th	N08	2004–2008	Mahdzir Khalid	BN (UMNO)
12th	N08	2008–2013	Mahdzir Khalid	BN (UMNO)
13th	N08	2013–2018	Kama Noriah Ibrahim	BN (UMNO)
14th	N08	2018–2020	Mohd Radzi Md Amin	PAS
14th	N08	2020–2023	Mohd Radzi Md Amin	PN (PAS)
15th	N08	2023–present	Mohd Radzi Md Amin	PN (PAS)

== Election results ==
Kedah state election, 2023: Pedu
Party	Candidate	Votes	%	∆%
PN	Mohd Radzi Md Amin	14,397	64.21	▲64.21
BN	Mahdzir Khalid	8,024	35.79	▼3.80
Total valid votes		22,421	100.00	
Total rejected ballots		160		
Unreturned ballots		14		
Turnout		22,595	78.99	▼7.51
Registered electors		28,606		
Majority		6,373	28.42	▲24.88
PN hold		Swing		

Kedah state election, 2018: Pedu
Party	Candidate	Votes	%	∆%
PAS	Mohd Radzi Md Amin	8,164	43.13	▲43.13
BN	Kama Noriah Ibrahim	7,494	39.59	▼18.59
PKR	Hashim Idris	3,272	17.28	▼24.54
Total valid votes		18,930	100.00	
Total rejected ballots		485		
Unreturned ballots		0		
Turnout		19,495	86.50	▼4.60
Registered electors		22,550		
Majority		670	3.54	▼12.82
PAS gain from BN		Swing		?

Kedah state election, 2013: Pedu
Party	Candidate	Votes	%	∆%
BN	Kama Noriah Ibrahim	10,522	58.18	▼1.04
PKR	Zamri Yusuf	7,562	41.82	▲41.82
Total valid votes		18,084	100.00	
Total rejected ballots		376		
Unreturned ballots		51		
Turnout		18,511	91.10	▲3.57
Registered electors		20,390		
Majority		2,960	16.36	▼2.08
BN hold		Swing		

Kedah state election, 2008: Pedu
Party	Candidate	Votes	%	∆%
BN	Mahdzir Khalid	8,780	59.22	▲2.15
PKR	Zamri Yusuf	6,047	40.78	▲40.78
Total valid votes		14,827	100.00	
Total rejected ballots		364		
Unreturned ballots		9		
Turnout		15,200	87.53	▲0.24
Registered electors		17,366		
Majority		2,733	18.44	▲4.34
BN hold		Swing		

Kedah state election, 2004: Pedu
Party	Candidate	Votes	%	∆%
BN	Mahdzir Khalid	7,684	57.05	▲9.03
PAS	Wan Jaafar Wan Ahmad	5,785	42.95	▼9.03
Total valid votes		13,469	100.00	
Total rejected ballots		188		
Unreturned ballots		0		
Turnout		13,657	87.29	▲3.97
Registered electors		15,646		
Majority		1,899	14.10	▲10.13
BN gain from PAS		Swing		?

Kedah state election, 1999: Pedu
Party	Candidate	Votes	%	∆%
PAS	Wan Jaafar Wan Ahmad	5,841	51.99	▲6.17
BN	Haji Awang Ahmad Haji Sulaiman	5,395	48.02	▼6.17
Total valid votes		11,236	100.00	
Total rejected ballots		311		
Unreturned ballots		8		
Turnout		11,555	83.32	▲3.58
Registered electors		13,868		
Majority		446	3.97	▼5.39
PAS gain from BN		Swing		?

Kedah state election, 1995: Pedu
Party	Candidate	Votes	%
BN	Ghazali Ibrahim	5,575	
PAS	Haji Othman Haji Mohd Marzuki	4,528	
Total valid votes		10,103	100.00
Total rejected ballots		216	
Unreturned ballots		18	
Turnout		10,337	79.74
Registered electors		12,964	
Majority		1,047	9.36
This was a new constituency created.
