= Padang Terap District =

- District of Kedah
- Daerah Padang Terap
- Seal

- Location of Padang Terap District in Kedah
- Interactive map of Padang Terap District
- Location of Padang Terap District in Malaysia
- Coordinates: 6°15′N 100°40′E
- Country: Malaysia
- State: Kedah
- Seat: Kuala Nerang
- Local area government(s): Padang Terap District Council

Government
  - District officer: Abd. Ghani @ Zulkifli Bin Zainuddin

Area
  - Total: 1,356.84 km^{2} (523.88 sq mi)

Population (2010)
  - Total: 61,325
  - Density: 45.197/km^{2} (117.06/sq mi)
- Time zone: UTC+8 (MST)
  - Summer (DST): UTC+8 (Not observed)
- Postcode: 06xxx
- Calling code: +6-04
- Vehicle registration plates: K

Padang Terap District Council Majlis Daerah Padang Terap

Type
- Type: Local authority

History
- Founded: 1976

Leadership
- President: Abd Ghani Zulkifli Zainuddin
- District Secretary: Muhammad Nur Ihsan Yahaya

Meeting place
- 06300 Kuala Nerang, Kedah Darul Aman

Website
- pbt.kedah.gov.my/index.php/majlis-daerah-padang-terap/

The Padang Terap District is a district in Kedah, Malaysia. It is governed by the Padang Terap District Council (Malay: Majlis Daerah Padang Terap). Padang Terap District shares a border with Thailand to the north, and with Sik District and Pendang District to the west. It is the third largest district in the State of Kedah, with Kuala Nerang serving as its administrative center.

== Etymology ==
Padang Terap is named after the Terap tree (Artocarpus elasticus) which is a type of drought-tolerant plant.

== Administrative divisions ==
Map of Padang Terap District

Padang Terap District is divided into 11 mukims, which are:

1. Batang Tunggang Kanan
2. Batang Tunggang Kiri
3. Belimbing Kanan
4. Belimbing Kiri
5. Kurong Hitam
6. Padang Temak
7. Padang Terap Kanan
8. Padang Terap Kiri
9. Pedu
10. Tekai
11. Tolak

== Demographics ==
Historical population
Year	Pop.	±%
1991	50,726	—
2000	55,847	+10.1%
2010	61,970	+11.0%
2020	65,698	+6.0%

== Federal Parliament and State Assembly Seats ==
List of Padang Terap district representatives in the Federal Parliament (Dewan Rakyat)

Parliament	Seat Name	Member of Parliament	Party
P7	Padang Terap	Nurul Amin Hamid	Perikatan Nasional (PAS)

List of Padang Terap district representatives in the State Legislative Assembly (Dewan Undangan Negeri)

Parliament	State	Seat Name	State Assemblyman	Party
P7	N7	Kuala Nerang	Munir @ Mohamad Yusuf Zakaria	Perikatan Nasional (PAS)
P7	N8	Pedu	Mohd Radzi Md Amin	Perikatan Nasional (PAS)

== Tourist attractions ==
- Pedu Lake
- Puncak Janing Recreational Forest (Hutan Lipur Puncak Janing)
- Seraya WaterFall (Air Terjun Seraya)

== See also ==
- Districts of Malaysia
