= Kuala Nerang =

Human settlement in Malaysia

Coordinates: 6°15′N 100°36′E

Kuala Nerang in Padang Terap District

Kuala Nerang is the capital of Padang Terap District, Kedah, Malaysia.

== Tourist attractions ==
- Puncak Janing Recreational Forest (Malay: Hutan Lipur Puncak Janing) - A recreational forest with a waterfall located within the Bukit Perangin Forest Reserve.
