= Family tree of Perakian monarchs =

The following is family tree of the Malay monarchs of Perak, from the establishment of the sultanate in 1528 to the present day.

== House of Melaka-Perak ==
House of Melaka-Perak

House of Melaka
Muzaffar I^{(1)} r. 1528–1549
Mansur I^{(2)} r. 1549–1577
Alauddin; Aceh r. 1579–1585	Ahmad Tajuddin^{(3)} r. 1577–1584	Tajul Ariffin^{(4)} r. 1584–1594	Mukaddam^{(6)} r. 1603–1619	Mahmud^{(8)} r. 1627–1630	♀ Princess	A Sultan of Aceh	Abdul Ghafur; Pahang r. 1592–1614
Raja Inu	Salehuddin^{(9)} r. 1630–1636	♀ Princess	Raja Abdullah
Alauddin^{(5)} r. 1594–1603	Mansur II^{(7)} r. 1619–1627	♀ Raja Putri; Fatima Puteh	Muzaffar II^{(10)} r. 1636–1654
House of Siak-Perak

== House of Siak-Perak ==
House of Siak-Perak

House of Melaka-Pahang
♀ Raja Putri; Fatima Puteh	Muzaffar II^{(10)} r. 1636–1653
Mahmud; Iskandar^{(11)} r. 1653–1720	Raja Mansur
Alauddin^{(12)} r. 1720–1728	Muzaffar III^{(13)} r. 1728–1752	Muhammad^{(14)} r. 1744–1750
Iskandar; Zulkarnain^{(15)} r. 1752–1765	Mahmud Shah^{(16)} r. 1765–1773	Alauddin; Mansur^{(17)} r. 1773–1786	Ahmaddin^{(18)} r. 1786–1806
Abdul Malik^{(19)} r. 1806–1825	Raja Inu; Muhammad Saleh	Raja Abdul Rahman	♀ Raja Mandak	Raja Syed Hitam of Siak
Abdullah Muazzam^{(20)} r. 1825–1830	Raja Ahmad	Shahbuddin^{(21)} r. 1830–1851	Abdullah; Muhammad^{(22)} r. 1851–1857
Jaafar Mua'azzam^{(23)} r. 1857–1865	Raja Alang; Iskandar	Ali; Al-Mukammal^{(24)} r. 1865–1871	Ismail Mua'abidin^{(25)} r. 1871–1874
Abdullah; Muhammad II^{(26)} r. 1874–18777	Raja Musa	Idris I^{(28)} r. 1887–1916	Yusuf Sharifuddin^{(27)} r. 1886–1887
Abdul Aziz^{(31)} r. 1938–1948	Abdul Jalil^{(29)} r. 1916–1918	Iskandar^{(30)} r. 1918–1938
Yussuff; Izzuddin^{(32)} r. 1948–1963	Idris II^{(33)} r. 1963–1984
House of Temenggong
Azlan^{(34)} r. 1984–2014; YDP Agong IX r. 1989–1994	Raja Iskandar Dzurkarnain; Raja Di Hilir	Raja Zarith Sofiah; Permaisuri Johor r. 2010–present Raja Permaisuri Agong XVII r. 2024–present	Ibrahim; Sultan Johor r. 2010–present YDP Agong XVII r. 2024–present
Matrilineally descendant of Abdul Hamid Halim
Tuanku Zara Salim; Raja Permaisuri Perak r. 2014–present	Nazrin^{(35)} r. 2014–present
Raja Azlan Muzzaffar Shah; Raja Kechil Besar

== See also ==
- House of Siak-Perak

== Bibliography ==
- Ooi, Keat Gin (2009), Historical Dictionary of Malaysia, Kuala Lumpur: Scarecrow Press, ISBN 978-0-8108-5955-5
- Pejabat D.Y.M.M. Paduka Seri Sultan Perak (2021), Senarai Sultan Perak ('List of Sultans of Perak'), archived from the original on 2019-09-07
- Ahmad Jelani Halimi (2008), Sejarah Dan Tamadun Bangsa Melayu ('History and the Civilisation of Malay people'), Kuala Lumpur: Utusan Publication & Distributors, ISBN 978-9-6761-2155-4
- Tun Suzana Tun Othman; Hj Muzaffar Dato' Hj Mohamad (2006), Ahlul-Bait (keluarga) Rasulullah SAW & Kesultanan Melayu, Kuala Lumpur: Crescent News, ISBN 978-9-8330-2012-6
