= Mansur Shah II of Perak =

Sultan of Perak (1619–1627)

Mansur Shah II منصور شاه كدوا
- Sultan of Perak

Sultan of Perak
- Reign: 1619–1627
- Predecessor: Mukaddam Shah
- Successor: Mahmud Shah I
- Born: Raja Mansur
- Died: 1627; Possibly in the Johor Sultanate or the Aceh Sultanate
- Burial: Possibly in the Johor Sultanate or the Aceh Sultanate
- Spouse: Putri Limau Purut
Names
- Raja Mansur ibni Almarhum Raja Kecil Lasa Raja Inu (راج منصور ابن المرحوم راج كچيل لاسا راج اينو)
Regnal name
- Paduka Sri Sultan Mansur Shah II ibni Almarhum Raja Kecil Lasa Raja Inu (ڤادوكا سري سلطان منصور شاه كدوا ابن المرحوم راج كچيل لاسا راج اينو)
Posthumous name
- Marhum Mangkat di Johor? (مرحوم مڠكت د جوهر)
- House: Perak
- Father: Raja Kecil Lasa Raja Inu
- Religion: Sunni Islam

Paduka Sri Sultan Mansur Shah II ibni Almarhum Raja Kecil Lasa Raja Inu (Jawi: ڤادوكا سري سلطان منصور شاه كدوا ابن المرحوم راج كچيل لاسا راج اينو; died 1627) was the seventh sultan of Perak. He was the brother of the fifth sultan of Perak, Sultan Alauddin Shah, and grandson of Sultan Ahmad Tajuddin Shah.

== Reign ==
After Sultan Mukaddam Shah of Perak died in 1619 in the Aceh Sultanate, a nobleman of Perak with the title of Maharaja Lela went to Johor. At that time Perak was still under the control of Aceh. So all decisions related to Perak had to get approval from the Sultan of Aceh. Even so, Maharaja Lela ignored the Sultan of Aceh and travelled to Johor to obtain a descendant of the Sultan of Perak to appoint a new sultan. Maharaja Lela brought Raja Mansur back to Perak where he was installed as the 7th sultan of Perak with the title Sultan Mansur Shah II. Mansur Shah II resided in Semat. According to the Sejarah Raja Perak, when Mansur Shah II ruled Perak, it is said that he went back and forth to Johor because he had another wife there. In 1627 after ruling Perak for 8 years, he died while in the Johor Sultanate and was buried there. However, there is a discrepancy in the information available regarding this when compared to the known history of Perak.

According to the known history of Perak, in 1627, Iskandar Muda of Aceh sent an army to Perak to overthrow Mansur Shah II. This was because Perak was still under the control of Aceh and Mansur Shah II had ascended to the throne of Perak without the consent of the Sultan of Aceh. Raja Bongsu or Raja Yusuf, younger brother of Mukaddam Shah, was appointed by the Acehnese nobles to replace Mansur Shah II.

== Burial ==
Sultan Mansur Shah II was then taken to Aceh and is said to have died there. There is no specific explanation regarding which history is more accurate. The official pamphlet during the coronation of Yusuf Izzuddin Shah in 1949, stated that Mansur Shah II was taken to Aceh and died there.

However, the official pamphlet during the coronation of Idris Al-Mutawakil Alallahi Shah, mentioned that Mansur Shah II had died in Johor and was called Marhum Mangkat di Johor. The tomb of Mansur Shah II has not been found in Johor nor Aceh. However, it is commonly believed that Mansur Shah II died in Aceh.

Mansur Shah II of Perak House of Melaka-Perak Died: 1627
Regnal titles
Preceded by Mukaddam Shah	Sultan of Perak; 1619–1627	Succeeded by Mahmud Shah I
