= Mukaddam Shah of Perak =

Mukaddam Shah مقدم شاه
- Sultan of Perak

Sultan of Perak
- Reign: 1603–1619
- Predecessor: Alauddin Shah
- Successor: Mansur Shah II
- Born: Raja Tua
- Died: 1619; Aceh Sultanate
- Burial: Aceh Sultanate
- Issue: Putri Limau Purut
Names
- Raja Tua (راج توا)
Regnal name
- Paduka Sri Sultan Mukaddam Shah (ڤادوكا سري سلطان مقدم شاه)
Posthumous name
- Marhum di Aceh (مرحوم د اچيه)
- House: Perak
- Mother: daughter of Mansur Shah I
- Religion: Sunni Islam

Paduka Sri Sultan Mukaddam Shah (Jawi: ڤادوكا سري سلطان مقدم شاه; died 1619) was the sixth sultan of Perak. He was the son of the sister of Sultan Ahmad Tajuddin and Sultan Tajul Ariffin Shah, and was the cousin of Raja Kecil Lasa Raja Inu. Before becoming sultan, he was known as Raja Tua.

Mukaddam Shah resided in an area known today as Bota Kanan.

According to one legend, one of Mukaddam Shah's daughters, Putri Limau Purut, was very beautiful. The princess was betrothed to her second cousin, Raja Mansur, younger brother of Alauddin Shah. Because of this, the proposal of Iskandar Muda of Aceh to marry Putri Limau Purut was rejected by Mukaddam Shah. Consequently, Iskandar Muda ordered his army to invade Perak and when the Acehnese defeated Perak, Mukaddam Shah, his wife, Putri Limau Purut, and his entourage were captured. They were taken to Aceh, and Mukaddam Shah later died in Aceh and was given the posthumous title Marhum di Aceh. In that time, a bendahara of Perak named Megat Abdullah had conducted a rescue operation. Thanks to him, Putri Limau Purut was brought back to Perak and married Raja Mansur.

There is also a story that states that Raja Mansur was captured and taken to Aceh together with the relatives of Mukaddam Shah. However, Raja Mansur was able to escape and fled to the Johor. In Johor, he married a Jambi princess, and in 1619 he returned to Perak to marry Putri Limau Purut and ascended the throne of Perak with the title Sultan Mansur Shah II.

At the end of the reign of Mukaddam Shah in 1619, Iskandar Muda sent his army to re-conquer Perak and other states in the Malay Peninsula. It is still unknown where Mukaddam Shah's tomb is, however, it is certain that it is located in Aceh.

Mukaddam Shah of Perak House of Melaka-Perak Died: 1619
Regnal titles
Preceded by Alauddin Shah	Sultan of Perak; 1603–1619	Succeeded by Mansur Shah II
