= Mahmud Shah I of Perak =

Mahmud Shah I محمود شاه ڤرتام

Sultan of Perak
- Reign: 1627–1630
- Predecessor: Mansur Shah II
- Successor: Sallehuddin
- Born: Raja Yusuf or Raja Bongsu
- Died: 1630
- Burial: Kampung Tok Melor, Perak Sultanate; then Kampung Melayu, Perak Sultanate; then Pulau Tiga, Lower Perak District, Perak Sultanate
- Issue: Sallehuddin
Names
- Raja Yusuf (راج يوسف); Raja Bongsu (راج بوڠسو)
Regnal name
- Paduka Sri Sultan Mahmud Shah I (ڤادوكا سري سلطان محمود شاه ڤرتام)
Posthumous name
- Marhum Pulau Tiga (مارحوم ڤولاو تيڬ)
- House: Perak
- Mother: daughter of Mansur Shah I
- Religion: Sunni Islam

Paduka Sri Sultan Mahmud Shah I (Jawi: ڤادوكا سري سلطان محمود شاه ڤرتام; died 1630) was the eighth sultan of Perak. He was the brother of Mukaddam Shah and grandson of Mansur Shah I

In 1627, Raja Yusuf or Raja Bongsu, younger brother of Mukaddam Shah, was appointed as the eighth sultan of Perak. Iskandar Muda of Aceh, crowned him to replace Mansur Shah II. He used the title Sultan Mahmud Shah and ruled Perak for three years from 1627 until his death in 1630.

It is said that Sultan Mahmud Shah's residence during his reign was in the Geronggong area close to Kampung Gajah.

Mahmud Shah died in 1630 and was buried on the banks of the Perak River, Kampung Tok Melor. After almost 300 years, his tomb was moved from its original location because it almost sank into the Perak River. The tomb was moved to Kampung Melayu. Now the tomb is located in Pulau Tiga, the same area as the tomb of Muhammad Shah, the 14th sultan of Perak.

There is not much information available regarding Mahmud Shah I.

He was succeeded by his son, Raja Kobat, who reigned as Sultan Sallehuddin.

Mahmud Shah I of Perak House of Melaka-Perak Died: 1630
Regnal titles
Preceded by Mansur Shah II	Sultan of Perak; 1627–1630	Succeeded by Salehuddin
