= Raja Nazhatul Shima =

Consort of the Crown Prince of Perak (born 1952)

Raja Nazhatul Shima راج نزهة السماء

Raja Puan Besar of Perak
- Tenure: 12 January 2019 – present
- Predecessor: Raja Nor Mahani
- Born: Raja Nazhatul Shima binti Raja Idris Shah; 20 February 1952 (age 74); Ipoh, Perak, British Malaya (presently Malaysia)
- Spouse: Syed Omar Alsagoff (m. 1972; died 2017) Raja Jaafar (m. 2019)
- Issue: Syed Saif Alsagoff; Syed Ibrahim Alsagoff; Dr. Syed Redzuan Alsagoff; Syed Shareef Alsagoff; Syed Idris Alsagoff; Syed Iskandar Alsagoff
Names
- Raja Nazhatul Shima binti Almarhum Sultan Idris Al-Mutawakil Alallahi Shah
Regnal name
- Raja Nazhatul Shima binti Almarhum Sultan Idris A’fifullah Shah
- House: Siak–Perak
- Father: Sultan Idris Al-Mutawakil Alallahi Shah
- Mother: Raja Perempuan Muzwin
- Religion: Islam

Raja Nazhatul Shima binti Almarhum Sultan Idris A’fifullah Shah (Jawi: راج نزهة السماء بنت المرحوم سلطان إدريس عفيف الله شاه; born 20 February 1952) is a member of the Perak royal family who is the Raja Puan Besar (Crown Princess) of Perak as the wife of Raja Jaafar, the Raja Muda (Crown Prince) of Perak. Affectionately known as Ku Dottie, she is the first child and eldest daughter of the late Sultan Idris Al-Mutawakil Alallahi Shah of Perak and the late Raja Perempuan Muzwin.

== Early life and education ==
Raja Nazhatul Shima was born on 20 February 1952 as the eighth of the fourteen children of Sultan Idris Al-Mutawakil Alallahi Shah of Perak and Raja Perempuan Muzwin. She is the elder sister of Raja Iskandar Dzurkarnain, the Raja Di-Hilir of Perak and Raja Jamil Ariffin as well as of Raja Zarith Sofiah, the Permaisuri (queen consort) of Johor and the current Raja Permaisuri Agong (Queen) of Malaysia.

Raja Nazhatul Shima received her early education at school from 1958 to 1962. She attended the Teluk Intan Girls' School and Teluk Intan Convent School.

On 22 October 1963, her father was installed as the 33rd Sultan of Perak, following which her family moved to Istana Iskandariah, Bukit Chandan, Kuala Kangsar, Perak and she continued studying at the Government English School in Kuala Kangsar. She excelled in her studies to the extent that she was qualified to continue her studies at Kolej Tunku Kurshiah in Seremban, Negeri Sembilan.

In 1968, she continued her studies at Upper Chine School, Shanklin, Isle of Wight until sixth form. She then took a Basic Course in art at Hornsey College of Art and continued her studies in Interior Architecture at Chelsea College of Art, London until she successfully obtained the L.C.A Diploma (London Certificate in Art And Design) and became a Member of the Society of Industry Artist and Designer (S.I.A.D).

== Marriage ==
Raja Nazhatul Shima was married on 16 September 1972 to famous Singaporean tycoon, Syed Omar Alsagoff (born 1937) at Istana Iskandariah. The couple had six sons. Alsagoff died in 2017.

On 12 January 2019, she married Raja Jaafar, the Raja Muda of Perak at Istana Riswin. Raja Jaafar was a widower following the death of his wife the late Raja Nor Mahani in 2017. Following her marriage, she was granted the title of Her Royal Highness Raja Puan Besar of Perak Darul Ridzuan.

== Children ==
From her first marriage to Dato' Syed Omar Alsagoff, she had six sons:

Name	Date of birth	Birthplace	Age	Date of marriage	Wife	Cucunda
Syed Saif Alsagoff	1 November 1974	Ipoh	52 years and 8 days			
Syed Ibrahim Firuzaman Alsagoff	23 November 1976	Ipoh	50 years and 8 days	13 January 2018	Farah binti Mohd Faizul	Sharifah Nadyatul Iman Alsagoff; Syed Ismail Iman Alsagoff; Sharifah Salma Elora Alsagoff
Dr. Syed Redzuan Alsagoff	5 October 1980	Ipoh	46 years, 1 month and 4 days	14 July 2018	Sharifah Nadiah Almahdaly binti Syed Ahmad	
Syed Shareef Alsagoff	25 June 1983	Ipoh	43 years, 4 months and 15 days			
Syed Idris Alsagoff	28 December 1986	Ipoh	39 years, 10 months and 12 days			
Syed Iskandar Alsagoff	2 December 1988	Ipoh	37 years, 11 months and 7 days	11 June 2022	Vivian Khor Min Zi	

== Styles and honours ==
Styles of Raja Nazhatul Shima
- Reference style: Her Royal Highness
- Spoken style: Your Royal Highness
- Alternative style: Tuanku

- Perak
  - Knight Grand Commander of the Order of Cura Si Manja Kini (SPCM) – Dato' Seri (1975)
- Johor
  - Second Class of the Royal Family Order of Johor (DK II) (2021)
- Pahang
  - Grand Knight of the Order of Sultan Ahmad Shah of Pahang (SSAP) – Dato' Sri (2018)
