= Salehuddin of Perak =

Sultan of Perak (1630–1636)

Salehuddin
- Sultan of Perak

Sultan of Perak
- Reign: 1630–1636
- Predecessor: Mahmud Shah I
- Successor: Muzaffar Shah II
- Born: 1589
- Died: 1636 (aged 47); Kampar, Sumatra
- Burial: Kampar, Sumatra
Names
- Paduka Sri Sultan Salehuddin ibni Almarhum Sultan Mahmud Shah I
Posthumous name
- Marhum Mangkat di Kampar
- House: Perak
- Father: Mahmud Shah I
- Religion: Sunni Islam

Sultan Salehuddin ibni Almarhum Sultan Mahmud Shah I (died 1636) was the ninth Sultan of Perak. He was the son of the eighth Sultan of Perak, Mahmud Shah I.

In 1630, Raja Kobat, the son of Sultan Mahmud Shah I, was crowned Sultan of Perak with the title of Sultan Salehuddin after the death of his father. During his reign, Perak was said to have been hit by a deadly cholera epidemic which killed many people in Perak. Sultan Salehuddin is said to have sailed to Kampar, Sumatra and died there in 1636.

According to a document from the History of the Kampar Society in the Peninsula, the relationship between Perak and Kampar began during the reign of Muzaffar Shah I and continued until the reign of Salehuddin. People from Kampar also migrated to Perak and were concentrated in Manjung and in the Beruas area.

Due to the lack of documentation and references, not much further information can be found regarding his life. The exact location of the tomb of Sultan Salehuddin in Kampar is unknown. With his death, the rule of Perak from the Melaka dynasty ended.

Salehuddin of Perak House of Melaka-Perak Died: 1636
Regnal titles
Preceded by Mahmud Shah I	Sultan of Perak; 1630–1636	Succeeded by Muzaffar Shah II
