= Megat Jaafar =

Malaysian politician

Megat Jaafar bin Megat Yunus was appointed by the Sultan of Perak in 1985 to the title Orang Kaya Besar Maharaja Diraja - one of the Four Major Chiefs (Orang Besar Empat) of Perak. Prior to that he was in the Malayan Civil Service (MCS). His father, Dato' Megat Yunus Bin Megat Mohd Isa was also a bearer of the same title - Orang Kaya Besar Maharaja Diraja of Perak.

He died in 2003. One of his sons, Maj (R) Megat Mustapha Kamal Bin Megat Jaafar was one of the founding committee members of Persatuan Keturunan Megat Terawis Malaysia.
