= Muzaffar Shah II of Perak =

Sultan of Perak (r. 1636–1653)

Muzaffar Shah II مظفر شاه كدوا
- Sultan of Perak

Sultan of Perak
- Reign: 1636–1653
- Predecessor: Salehuddin
- Successor: Mahmud Iskandar Shah
- Born: Raja Sulong
- Died: 1653
- Burial: Air Mati, Kuala Kangsar, Perak Sultanate
- Spouse: Raja Putri Fatima Putih
- Issue: Sultan Mahmud Iskandar Shah of Perak; Raja Mansur
Names
- Raja Sulong ibni Almarhum Raja Mahmud (راج سولوڠ ابن المرحوم راج محمود)
Regnal name
- Paduka Sri Sultan Muzaffar Shah II ibni Almarhum Raja Mahmud (ڤادوكا سري سلطان مظفر شاه كدوا ابن المرهوم راج محمود)
Posthumous name
- Marhum Jalilullah (مرحوم جليل الله)
- House: Perak
- Father: Raja Mahmud
- Religion: Sunni Islam

Muzaffar Shah II ibni Almarhum Raja Mahmud (Jawi: ڤادوكا سري سلطان مظفر شاه كدوا ابن المرهوم راج محمود; died 1653) was the tenth Sultan of Perak reigning from 1636 to 1653. He was the first Sultan of Perak to come from a different dynasty from the first nine Sultans of Perak. His paternal grandmother, Raja Putri Putih, was the daughter of Sultan Mansur Shah II of Pahang.

== Biography ==
When Iskandar Muda of Aceh, attacked and defeated Pahang in 1618, Ahmad Shah II of Pahang and his son, Raja Mughal, and many Pahangese people were captured and taken to Aceh. Among those who became prisoners of Aceh includes a child named Raja Sulong.

=== Reign ===
Iskandar Muda died in 1636 and his son-in-law, Raja Mughal, was appointed Sultan of Aceh with the title Sultan Iskandar Thani Alauddin Mughayat Shah. In the same year, Iskandar Thani sent his distant cousin Raja Sulong to become the Sultan of Perak as Perak was still under control of the Aceh Sultanate. When Raja Sulong reached Perak, he was appointed as the 10th Sultan of Perak following the death of the 9th Sultan of Perak, Salehuddin, he used the title Sultan Muzaffar Shah II.

Muzaffar Shah II married Raja Putri Fatima Putih, the great-granddaughter of Mansur Shah I of Perak and granddaughter of Abdul Ghafur Muhiuddin Shah of Pahang. The couple had Raja Mahmud and Raja Mansur.

==== Dutch conflict ====
Before the Dutch defeated the Portuguese in Malacca in 1641, the Dutch came to Aceh to get permission from Iskandar Thani to buy tin in Perak. Iskandar Thani agreed to permit the Dutch. After that, the Dutch went to see Muzaffar Shah II to tell him that the permission to buy tin in Perak had been granted by his overlord, Iskandar Thani, he then also permitted the Dutch. The Dutch then built houses where they did business near the banks of the Perak River.

Dutch business in Perak went well until 1641. In 1641, Iskandar Thani died and his widow, Putri Sri Alam, daughter of Iskandar Muda, was appointed Sultana of Aceh with the title Sultana Tajul Alam Safiatuddin Shah succeeding her husband. Since then, the overlordship of Aceh in the Malay Peninsula began to gradually decline until only Perak remained under Acehnese control.

In mid 1641, a Dutch merchant named Jan Dircxen Puijit came to Perak with much merchandise to trade. Puijit went in to meet with Muzaffar Shah II and presented a letter and gift from the Dutch governor, Johan van Twist, who was in Malacca. In the letter from the Dutch Governor, there was a proposal regarding restricting merchants from other nations from purchasing tin in Perak and also suggesting that they sell tin only to the Dutch. Muzaffar Shah II welcomed and gifted Puijit a sword and dagger, and awarded him the title Seri Johan Pahlawan. Moreover, Muzaffar Shah II also gave houses to the Dutch to replace their houses that were worn out. Muzaffar Shah II also stated that he felt very honored to buy merchandise from the Dutch on the condition that each purchase was authorized by credit.

However, the proposal to prohibit other nations from buying tin was still pending. Muzaffar Shah II stated that the matter would be brought to a meeting with the noblemen of Perak first. Muzaffar Shah II was continuing to be urged by the Dutch Governor about the pending proposal, but the Sultan remained adamant about not preventing other nations from buying tin. It got to a point where the Muzaffar Shah II threatened to take back the houses that had been given to the Dutch when Puijit first arrived in Perak.

Because the Sultan did not want to give in to the Dutch's request, the Dutch started looking for ways to block Javanese, Chinese, and Indian traders from coming to Perak. Several Dutch ships were blockading the Perak river basin just to prevent the entry of people entering Perak.

The restrictions that were made by the Dutch in the Perak river basin were later protested by the Perak Government. Furthermore, the Dutch then went to Aceh to explain their restrictions in Perak. The Acehnese then instructed the Perak government to not prevent other nations from buying tin in Perak. This was because the Dutch could still buy the most tin from Perak.

In 1650, Governor-General Cornelis van der Lijn, sent a representative, Joan Truijtman, to Aceh. When he arrived in Aceh, they forced Tajul Alam Safiatuddin Shah to make an agreement with the Dutch that allowed only the Dutch to buy tin in Perak. Tajul Alam Safiatuddin Shah accepted the agreement and ordered the Perak government to obey her orders. The agreement was signed by both parties on 15 August 1650. A year later, the Dutch plant in Kuala Perak was attacked and destroyed by the Malays and many Dutch people were killed as a result of the attack. At that moment, Dutch encroachment stopped and they no longer traded in Perak.

=== Death ===
Muzaffar Shah II ruled Perak for 17 years from 1636 to 1653. He died in 1653 with the title Marhum Jalilullah and was buried in Air Mati.

Muzaffar Shah II of Perak House of Siak-Perak Died: 1653
Regnal titles
| Preceded by Salehuddin | Sultan of Perak; 1636–1653 | Succeeded by Mahmud Iskandar Shah |
