= Idris Al-Mutawakil Alallahi Shah of Perak =

Sultan of Perak (r. 1963–1984)

Idris Shah II إدريس شاه ٢
- Marhum Afifullah (the modest one by God)

Sultan of Perak
- Reign: 5 January 1963 – 31 January 1984
- Installation: 26 October 1963
- Predecessor: Yussuf Izzuddin Shah of Perak
- Successor: Azlan Shah of Perak
- Menteri Besar: See list: Shaari Shafie Ahmad Said Kamaruddin Mohd. Isa Mohamed Ghazali Jawi Wan Mohamed Wan Teh Ramli Ngah Talib
- Born: Raja Idris Shah ibni Sultan Iskandar Shah; 17 August 1924; Istana Negara, Bukit Chandan, Kuala Kangsar, Perak, Federated Malay States, British Malaya
- Died: 31 January 1984 (aged 59); Lumut, Perak, Malaysia
- Burial: 3 February 1984; Al-Ghufran Royal Mausoleum, Kuala Kangsar, Perak, Malaysia
- Spouse: Raja Noor Izah binti Raja Ali (m. 1943; div. 1957) Raja Muzwin binti Raja Arif Shah (m. 1943; died 2011) Che Asmah (divorced) Che Puan Hanizah (divorced) Che Puan Aminah (Amy Lim) (m. 1960–1984) Sharifah Salmah binti Syed Ahmad (m. 1964) Che Satira binti Abdullah (m. 1967; died 2011): Norizan binti Hamzah (d. 2006)
- Issue: Raja Izzuddin Iskandar Shah; Raja Iskandar Dzurkarnain; Raja Shahruzzaman (d. 2014); Raja Alang Iskandar (d. 2003); Raja Jamil Ariffin; Raja Ahmaddin Razman; Raja Shaharuddin Rashid; Raja Nazhatul Shima; Raja Halimahton Shahrin (d. 2019); Raja Zarith Sofiah; Raja Radziatul Zahar (d. 1965); Raja Juliana Rafeah; Raja Saidatul Mardiah; Raja Shuib
Regnal name
- Sultan Idris Al-Mutawakil Alallahi Shah Ibni Almarhum Sultan Iskandar Shah Kaddasullah; Sultan Idris A'fifullah Shah (after his death)
- House: House of Siak-Perak
- Father: Sultan Iskandar Shah Ibni Almarhum Sultan Idris Murshidul Azzam Shah Rahmatullah
- Mother: Raja Puteh Umi Kalsom Binti Raja Kulop Muhammad Kramat
- Religion: Sunni Islam

Sultan Idris Al-Mutawakil Alallahi Shah Ibni Almarhum Sultan Iskandar Shah Kaddasullah, CMG (Jawi: سلطان إدريس المتوكل على الله شاه ابن المرحوم سلطان إسكندر شاه قدس الله; 17 August 1924 – 31 January 1984) was the 33rd sultan of Perak reigning from 5 January 1963 until his death on 31 January 1984. He was the son of Sultan Iskandar Shah.

== Early life and education ==
He was born on 17 August 1924 at the Istana Negara in Kuala Kangsar, Perak. He was the second son of Sultan Iskandar and Raja Puteh Umi Kalsom. His father was a son of Sultan Iskandar Shah and a brother of Sultan Abdul Jalil. His oldest brother died when he was 40 days old. He was named Raja Idris Shah at birth.

He was educated at Clifford School, Kuala Kangsar and furthered his studies at the Malay College Kuala Kangsar. He was made raja di hilir in 1933, succeeding Raja Chulan, who died that year. He was appointed raja bendahara in October 1938 upon the death of his father. Ten years later, on 29 March 1948, Sultan Abdul Aziz, died and Raja Idris was made raja muda (crown prince) by his cousin, the new sultan, Yussuf Izzuddin Shah.

== Sultan of Perak ==
Upon the death of Sultan Yussuf Izzuddin Shah on 5 January 1963, he was appointed as the 33rd Sultan of Perak assuming the title – Sultan Idris Al-Mutawakil Alallahi Shah Ibni Almarhum Sultan Iskandar Shah Kaddasullah.

== Death and succession ==
Sultan Idris Al-Mutawakil was the frontrunner to be elected Malaysia's eighth Yang Di-Pertuan Agong. However on 31 January 1984, a week before being elected, he died after suffering a heart attack at the Angkatan Tentera Hospital, Lumut at 11:15 pm.

He was 59 and had been the Sultan of Perak for 21 years.

He was interred at the Al-Ghufran Royal Mausoleum at Bukit Chandan and the posthumous title of Marhum Afifullah was conferred. His funeral took place on 3 February 1984 and was buried at the Al-Ghufran Royal Mausoleum near Ubudiah Mosque, Kuala Kangsar.

He was succeeded by his first cousin once removed, Raja Azlan Shah.

== Legacy ==
The state mosque of Perak in Ipoh and Sultan Idris Shah II Bridge in Bota are named after him.

== Marriages and children ==
Sultan Idris first married, Raja Noor Izah binti Raja Ali. She was styled Raja Puan Besar until their divorce 14 years later. He then married his first cousin once removed Raja Muzwin, the daughter of Raja Ariff Shah bin Raja Harun, on 12 August 1943. Idris's grandfather, Sultan Idris Shah I, was Raja Muzwin's great-grandfather. She became known as Raja Perempuan upon Sultan Idris ascending the Perakian throne. Among his children were:

1. Raja Nazhatul Shima (born 1952), who is Raja Puan Besar (Crown Princess) of Perak married Raja Muda (Crown Prince) of Perak, Raja Jaafar ibni Almarhum Raja Muda Musa on 12 January 2019 after her first husband, Syed Omar Alsagoff died in 2017.
2. Raja Dato' Seri Izzuddin Iskandar Shah (born 1953), married Tengku Datin Seri Noor Hazah (born 1955).
3. Raja Iskandar Dzurkarnain (born 1955), who is Raja Di-Hilir, married Tunku Soraya (born 1960), adopted daughter cum matrilineal line niece of Sultan Abdul Halim of Kedah.
4. Raja Halimahton Shahrin (1957-2019), drowned at sea while scuba diving in Pulau Perhentian, Besut, Terengganu.
5. Raja Zarith Sofiah (born 1959), who is Permaisuri (Queen Consort) of Johor married Sultan Ibrahim of Johor.
6. Raja Jamil Ariffin (born 1962), married Datin Seri Fazilah Hani binti Dato' Harun on 18 February 2021 after his first wife, Tengku Datin Seri Dato' Zalila binti Tengku Kamarulzaman died in 2020.
7. Raja Radziatul Zahar (born 1965), died during infancy.

The Sultan was also claimed to have a son with an Elizabeth Rosa, who was placed for adoption. Keith Williams was raised in Wales, and in 2015 traced his birth parents for a documentary for S4C.

His grandchildren:

- By Raja Nazhatul Shima (Raja Puan Besar of Perak) and Syed Omar Alsagoff:
  - Syed Saif Alsagoff (born 1973)
  - Syed Ibrahim Alsagoff (born 1976)
  - Syed Redzuan Alsagoff (born 1981)
  - Syed Shareef Alsagoff (born 1983)
  - Syed Idris Alsagoff (born 1986)
  - Syed Iskandar Alsagoff (born 1988)
- By Raja Dato' Seri Izzuddin Iskandar Shah Al-Haj (born 1953) and Tengku Datin Seri Noor Hazah (born 7 November 1955 (age 70)) daughter of (Tengku Abdul Aziz Shah):
  - Raja Teh Umi Kalsom (born 26 October 1977)
  - Raja Muzaffar Idris Shah (born 28 December 1979)
  - Raja Putra Muhamad Riza (born 13 December 1981)
- By Raja Iskandar Dzurkarnain (Raja Di-Hilir of Perak) and Tunku Soraya (Raja Puan Muda of Perak), adopted daughter cum niece of Sultan Abdul Halim of Kedah:
  - Raja Nabil Imran (born 1987)
  - Raja Idris Shah (born 1989)
  - Raja Sarina Intan Bahiyah (born 1992)
  - Raja Safia Azizah (born 1997)
  - Raja Siffudin Muazzam Shah (born 1999)
- By Raja Zarith Sofiah (Queen Consort of Johor) and Sultan Ibrahim Ismail of Johor:
  - Tunku Mahkota of Johor (Crown Prince of Johor), Tunku Ismail Idris (born 1984)
  - Tunku Tun Aminah Maimunah Iskandariah (born 1986)
  - Tunku Temenggong of Johor, Tunku Idris (born 1987)
  - Tunku Laksamana of Johor, Tunku Abdul Jalil (1990-2015)
  - Tunku Panglima of Johor, Tunku Abdul Rahman Hassanal Jefri (born 1993)
  - Tunku Putera of Johor, Tunku Abu Bakar (born 2001)
- By Raja Jamil Ariffin and Tengku Zalila (princess of the House of Jamalullail (Perlis)):
  - Raja Rafiuddin Ariff Shah (born 1992)
  - Raja Idris Iskandar Shah (born 1995)
  - Raja Muhammad Hazim Shah (born 2003)

His great-grandchildren as of 2024:

- By Tunku Ismail Idris and Che' Puan Besar Khaleeda:
  - Tunku Khalsom Aminah Sofiah (born on 25 June 2016) (age 10 years, 4 months and 10 days)
  - Tunku Iskandar Abdul Jalil Abu Bakar Ibrahim (born on 14 October 2017) (age 9 years and 21 days)
  - Tunku Abu Bakar Ibrahim (born 17 July 2019) (age 7 years, 3 months and 18 days)
  - Tunku Zahrah Zarith Aziyah (born 21 April 2021) (age 5 years, 6 months and 14 days)
- By Syed Ibrahim Alsagoff and Suzanna:
  - Sharifah Nadyatul Iman Alsagoff (born on 23 August 2005) (age 21 years, 2 months and 12 days)
  - Syed Ismail Iman Alsagoff (born on 28 November 2006) (age 19 years, 11 months and 7 days)

== Honours ==
=== Honours of Perak ===
- Grand Master of the Royal Family Order of Perak (5 January 1963 – 31 January 1984)
- Grand Master of the Order of Cura Si Manja Kini (5 January 1963 – 31 January 1984)
- Founding Grand Master of the Order of Taming Sari (1977 – 31 January 1984)
- Grand Master of the Order of the Perak State Crown (5 January 1963 – 31 January 1984)

=== Other honours ===
- Malaya
  - Recipient of the Order of the Crown of the Realm (DMN) (1963)
- Malaysia
  - Recipient of the Malaysian Commemorative Medal (Gold) (PPM) (1965)
- Johor
  - Grand Commander of the Royal Family Order of Johor (DK I) (1967)

Regnal titles
| Preceded by Sultan Yussuf Izzuddin Shah Ibni Almarhum Sultan Abdul Jalil Karamatullah Nasiruddin Mukhataram Shah Radziallah | Sultan of Perak; 1963–1984 | Succeeded by Sultan Azlan Muhibbuddin Shah Ibni Almarhum Sultan Yussuf Izzuddin Shah Ghafarullahu-lah |
