= Mahmud Iskandar Shah of Perak =

Sultan of Perak (r. 1653–1720)

Mahmud Iskandar Shah محمود اسكندر شاه
- Sultan of Perak

Sultan of Perak
- Reign: 1653–1720
- Predecessor: Muzaffar Shah II
- Successor: Alauddin Mughayat Shah
- Born: Raja Mahmud; Perak Sultanate
- Died: 1720; Perak Sultanate
- Burial: Geronggong, Perak Sultanate
Names
- Raja Mahmud ibni Almarhum Sultan Muzaffar Shah II (راج محمود ابن المرحوم سلطان مظفر شاه كدوا)
Regnal name
- Paduka Sri Sultan Mahmud Iskandar Shah ibni Almarhum Sultan Muzaffar Shah II (ڤادوكا سري سلطان محمود اسكندر شاه ابن المرحوم سلطان مظفر شاه كدوا)
Posthumous name
- Marhum Besar Uliallah (مرحوم بسر علي الله)
- House: Perak
- Father: Muzaffar Shah II
- Mother: Raja Putri Fatima Putih
- Religion: Sunni Islam

Mahmud Iskandar Shah ibni Almarhum Sultan Muzaffar Shah II (Jawi: ڤادوكا سري سلطان محمود اسكندر شاه ابن المرحوم سلطان مظفر شاه كدوا; ?–1720) was the eleventh and longest-reigning sultan of Perak reigning from 1653 to 1720. He was the son of Muzaffar Shah II and Raja Putri Fatima Putih, granddaughter of Sultan Abdul Ghafur of Pahang.

== Reign and conflict with the Dutch ==
After the death of Sultan Muzaffar Shah II in 1653, his son Raja Mahmud was appointed as the 11th sultan of Perak with the title Sultan Mahmud Iskandar Shah and resided in Geronggong. Because Mahmud Iskandar Shah did not have a son, his younger brother Raja Mansur who resided on Pulau Tiga was appointed sultan muda (crown prince) and was known as Yang di-Pertuan Muda Mansur Shah. Raja Mansur had 6 sons namely Raja Radin, Raja Inu, Raja Bisnu, Raja Daha, Raja Abdul Hamid, and Raja Su. However, Raja Mansur died on Pulau Tiga during Mahmud Iskandar Shah's reign and received the posthumous name of Marhum Mangkat di Pulau Tiga.

In December 1653, Joan Truijtman came to Perak and made an agreement. The conditions in the agreement made by Truijtman with the late Muzaffar Shah II were also used for this agreement. The agreement listed the conditions for Perak to give land to the Dutch East India Company (VOC) to build a plant or warehouse for them to do business. They were also given the right to wholesale tin in Perak at a fixed price and tax. Perak was also asked to pay all the damages faced by the Dutch when they were attacked by the Malays in 1651 during the reign of Muzaffar Shah II.

The agreement made 1653 was not held well by Perak which caused the VOC to come back to make a third agreement with Perak where the terms and demands were almost the same as the previous agreement. Although a new agreement had been made, Perak still did not abide to the agreement with tin products from Perak being sent to the Aceh Sultanate instead of being sold to the Dutch. As a result, tin was smuggled out to sell to other nations.

The Dutch finally left their plant in Perak due to the agreement not being followed. They began to block the ships of other nations that wanted to come to do business in Perak. They also confiscated any merchandise from other nations' ships that they found along the waters between Perak and Aceh. This action by the Dutch scared foreign traders away.

To end the conflict between Perak and the Dutch, a peace agreement was made between the Acehnese government and the VOC in 1659. After the peace agreement, the Dutch began buying tin in Perak. According to the agreement, only Aceh and the VOC were allowed to buy tin products in Perak. However, there are more cases of tin products being smuggled by the people of Perak to merchants of other nations because the purchase price set by the Dutch to buy tin products was not profitable.

Once again the Dutch closed their plant in Perak at the end of 1663 because of the hostility of the Malays in Perak. The Dutch again began blocking merchant ships of other nations that wanted to buy tin in Perak. the VOC returned to Perak in 1665 and opened their plant. The arrival of the Dutch this time caused Perak to be tightly controlled by a force of Dutch warships in the Perak River delta. In 1670, the authorities of the VOC in Batavia ordered their forces in Malacca to take Pangkor Island and build a warehouse made of wood as they were afraid that the island would be taken by the British.

There were several attacks made by the Malays against Dutch ships that were sailing on the seas and rivers of Perak. Therefore, the Dutch increased their control along the coast and rivers of Perak. In 1678, a total of 59 Dutchmen were assigned to guard the sea coast in Perak. In February 1680, Mahmud Iskandar Shah sent his envoys to Malacca to express his friendship with the VOC. Mahmud Iskandar Shah then granted power of attorney to a Dutch leader named Adriaen Wylant who lived in the Perak River delta in April 1680 because of the request of the Dutch Governor of Malacca. The power of attorney talks about giving authority to imprison anyone who came out of Perak with tin products without a letter of permission and if the person resisted, they could be executed. Also in 1680, most of the Dutch warehouses on Pangkor Island were replaced with stone. The effect of the power of attorney given by Mahmud Iskandar Shah to the Dutch caused the strict control exercised by the Dutch to control Perak so much so that the VOC's business declined in 1682.

In 1690, a group of Malays led by the commander Kulub came to attack a Dutch city on Pangkor Island. The situation caused many lives of the Dutch to be mortgaged and the city was abandoned by the Dutch until 1745.

At the beginning of the 18th century, Perak was no longer under the control of the Aceh Sultanate as the latter became weaker.

== Death ==
Mahmud Iskandar Shah ruled Perak for 67 years. He died in 1720 when he was 120 years old and was buried in Geronggong. Sultan Mahmud Iskandar Shah was the sultan who ruled Perak for the longest time since he was enthroned at the age of 53.

Mahmud Iskandar Shah of Perak House of Siak-Perak Born: 1600 Died: 1720
Regnal titles
Preceded by Muzaffar Shah II	Sultan of Perak; 1653–1720	Succeeded by Alauddin Mughayat Shah
