= Alauddin Shah of Perak =

Alauddin Shah علاء الدين شاه

Sultan of Perak
- Reign: 1594–1603
- Predecessor: Tajul Ariffin
- Successor: Mukaddam Shah
- Born: Raja Ali
- Died: 1603 (aged 18)
- Burial: Bota Kanan, Pulau Bota, Kuala Kangsar, Perak Sultanate
Names
- Raja Ali ibni Almarhum Raja Kecil Lasa Raja Inu (راج علي ابن المرحوم راج كچيل لاسا راج اينو)
Regnal name
- Paduka Sri Sultan Alauddin Shah ibni Almarhum Raja Kecil Lasa Raja Inu (ڤادوكا سري سلطان علاء الدين شاه ابن المرحوم راج كچيل لاسا راج اينو)
Posthumous name
- Marhum Mangkat di Darat (مرحوم مڠكت د دارات)
- House: Perak
- Father: Raja Kecil Lasa Raja Inu
- Religion: Sunni Islam

Paduka Sri Sultan Alauddin Shah ibni Almarhum Raja Kecil Lasa Raja Inu (Jawi: ڤادوكا سري سلطان علاءالدين شاه ابن المرحوم راج كچيل لاسا راج اينو; died 1603) was the fifth sultan of Perak. He was the son of Raja Kecil Lasa Raja Inu, son of Ahmad Tajuddin Shah.

Little is known about Alauddin Shah, due to lack of documentation.

== Reign ==
In 1594, after Tajul Ariffin died, Raja Ali, grandson of Ahmad Tajuddin Shah was appointed the 5th sultan of Perak. He ascended the throne with the title Sultan Alauddin Shah and settled by the river in an area now known as Bota Kanan. Alauddin Shah ruled Perak for about nine years from 1594 to 1603. Sultan Alauddin Shah's government was centered in Pulau Bota and during his reign, Aceh still housed several Acehnese noblemen to oversee and administer Perak.

== Death ==
Alauddin Shah died in 1603 and was titled Marhum Mangkat di Darat. Originally, he was buried on the banks of the Perak River at the end of Pulau Bota. When the tomb almost collapsed into the river, it was moved behind a row of shops in the town of Bota Kanan. Alauddin Shah's mausoleum is located in the town of Bota Kanan and is close to Ahmaddin Shah's mausoleum.

Alauddin Shah of Perak House of Melaka-Perak Died: 1603
Regnal titles
Preceded by Tajul Ariffin	Sultan of Perak; 1594–1603	Succeeded by Mukaddam Shah
