= Muzaffar Shah I of Perak =

Sultan of Perak (1528–1549)

Muzaffar Shah I مظفر شاه ڤرتام
- Sultan of Perak

Sultan of Perak
- Reign: 1528–1549
- Coronation: Tanah Abang, Lambor Kanan, Perak Sultanate
- Predecessor: Title created
- Successor: Mansur Shah I
- Born: Raja Muzaffar; 1505
- Died: 1549 (aged 43–44); Tanah Abang, Lambor Kanan, Perak Sultanate
- Burial: Tanah Abang, Lambor Kanan, Perak Sultanate
- Spouse: Tun Terang
- Issue: Mansur Shah I
Names
- Raja Muzaffar ibni Almarhum Sultan Mahmud Shah (راج مظفر ابن المرحوم سلطان محمود شاه)
Regnal name
- Paduka Sri Sultan Muzaffar Shah I ibni Almarhum Sultan Mahmud Shah (ڤادوكا سري سلطان مظفر شاه ڤرتام ابن المرحوم سلطان محمود شاه)
- House: Perak
- Father: Mahmud Shah of Malacca
- Mother: Putri Onang Kening
- Religion: Sunni Islam

Muzaffar Shah I ibni Almarhum Sultan Mahmud Shah (Jawi: ڤادوكا سري سلطان مظفر شاه ڤرتام ابن المرحوم سلطان محمود شاه; 1505–1549) was the first sultan of Perak, reigning from 1528 to 1549.

== Life ==
=== Early years ===
He was born with the name Raja Muzaffar in 1505, the son of Mahmud Shah of Malacca and Putri Onang Kening, daughter of Mansur Shah of Kelantan.

When the Malacca Sultanate fell to the Portuguese Empire in 1511, Mahmud Shah, his wife, children, and entourage retreated to Ulu Muar. He then moved to Pahang, then to Pulau Bintan and ruled there. While in Pulau Bintan, Raja Muzaffar was married to Tun Terang. Tun Terang was the stepdaughter of Mahmud Shah, and the daughter of Tun Fatimah and her first husband Tun Ali. Raja Muzaffar and his wife had a son named Raja Mansur, his future successor.

When Mahmud Shah was defeated by the Portuguese in 1526, he retreated to Kampar in Sumatra. When he passed away there around 1528, Raja Ali succeeded him. Raja Muzaffar was driven out by the Bendahara and chiefs, so he, his wife, and their son Raja Mansur left Kampar, stopped in Klang, then went to Perak.

=== Reign ===
Raja Muzaffar was appointed by the people of Perak as the first Sultan of Perak. That is the story of the first Sultan of Perak as mentioned in the Malay Annals. However, the story is different according to the Sejarah Raja Perak. At the time of Mahmud Shah's residence in Kampar, Perak was not a sultanate. The people of Perak sent their representatives, namely Tun Saban and Nakhoda Kasim to Kampar to meet Mahmud Shah. The purpose of this was to request that Raja Muzaffar become Sultan of Perak because Perak was under the rule of the Malacca Sultanate since Mahmud Shah ruled it again. Mahmud Shah accepted and his son, Raja Muzaffar, was ordered to go to Perak to become Sultan. From Kampar, Raja Muzaffar then went to Klang to visit his family. From Klang with the guidance of Nakhoda Tumi who came from Manjong, Raja Muzaffar continued his journey to Perak. The arrival of Raja Muzaffar was welcomed at Beting Beras Basah and he was taken via the Perak River to Perak. Raja Muzaffar was later installed as the first Sultan of Perak with the title Sultan Muzaffar Shah in Tanah Abang which is located in the Lambor Kanan area.

In the Malay Annals, it is stated that Muzaffar Shah I invited Tun Mahmud, son of Tun Isap Berakah, from Selangor to come to Perak. Tun Mahmud was made the first bendahara of Perak. Afterwards, Tun Mahmud was summoned by Alauddin Riayat Shah II of Johor at the request of the Bendahara of Johor and his father, Tun Isap Berakah.

According to the Sejarah Raja Perak, not long after Muzaffar Shah I ascended to the throne of Perak, conflict began to arise between him and Tun Saban. This is because Tun Saban did not want to give his daughter, Tun Merah, to Muzaffar Shah I to be his wife. Muzaffar Shah I then ordered his subordinates to take Tun Merah down to the palace until the outbreak of war.

A war broke out between Muzaffar Shah I and Tun Saban. Muzaffar Shah I then offered the title of Bendahara of Perak to anyone who could kill Tun Saban. Megat Terawis, son of Megat Terawan by a concubine, who went to Perak together with Muzaffar Shah I from Kampar accepted the Sultan's offer. During the war, Megat Terawis succeeded in killing Tun Saban and Muzaffar Shah I appointed him the Bendahara of Perak by replacing Tun Mahmud who had gone to Johor. Since then, the position of Bendahara of Perak was held by the descendants of Megat Terawis until the reign of Sultan Iskandar Zulkarnain, the fifteenth sultan of Perak. After Tun Saban died, Perak was then handed over to the rule of Muzaffar Shah I whose center of government was in Tanah Abang.

== Death ==
Sultan Muzaffar Shah I ruled Perak from 1528 until his death in 1549 and was buried in Tanah Abang.

== Sources ==
- https://www.orangperak.com/sultan-muzaffar-shah-i-sultan-perak-pertama.html

Muzaffar Shah I of Perak House of Melaka-Perak Born: 1505 Died: 1549
Regnal titles
Preceded by Title created	Sultan of Perak; 1528–1549	Succeeded by Mansur Shah I
