= Megat Khas =

Malaysian politician

Dr Megat Khas bin Megat Omar (8 April 1908 - 21 June 1979). He was born in Istana Talang, Kuala Kangsar, Perak and was a direct descendant of Megat Terawis, the first Bendahara of Perak.

His father was Megat Omar bin Megat Muhammad Ali of Kota Lama Kiri, Kuala Kangsar, Perak.

Having married his first cousin, Puteri Hawa Binti Megat Osman; his uncle Dato' Lela Diraja Megat Osman Bin Megat Muhammad Ali -- who was a member of the Kelantan royal court would also be his father-in-law.

Megat Khas was educated at the Straits and Federated Malay States Government Medical School in Singapore (later renamed King Edward VII College of Medicine)(1925-1931) and soon became the first Malay to obtain Membership to the Royal College of Physicians (MRCP) in 1950.

During his lifetime, he was awarded several orders and decorations. He retired as Perak's State Physician.

He was also active in the St John Ambulance and offered his services within the St John Ambulance for 26 years (1950-1976). He was Commissioner of the St John Ambulance Brigade of West Malaysia. He was Deputy Commander and retired as the Supreme Commander of St John Ambulance, Asia Region.

He died of a heart attack at 71 and is buried at the Muslim Cemetery at Jalan Kuala Kangsar, Gurap, Ipoh, Perak.
