= Raja Jaafar =

Crown Prince of Perak (born 1941)

Raja Ja'afar راج جعفر
- Raja Muda of Perak
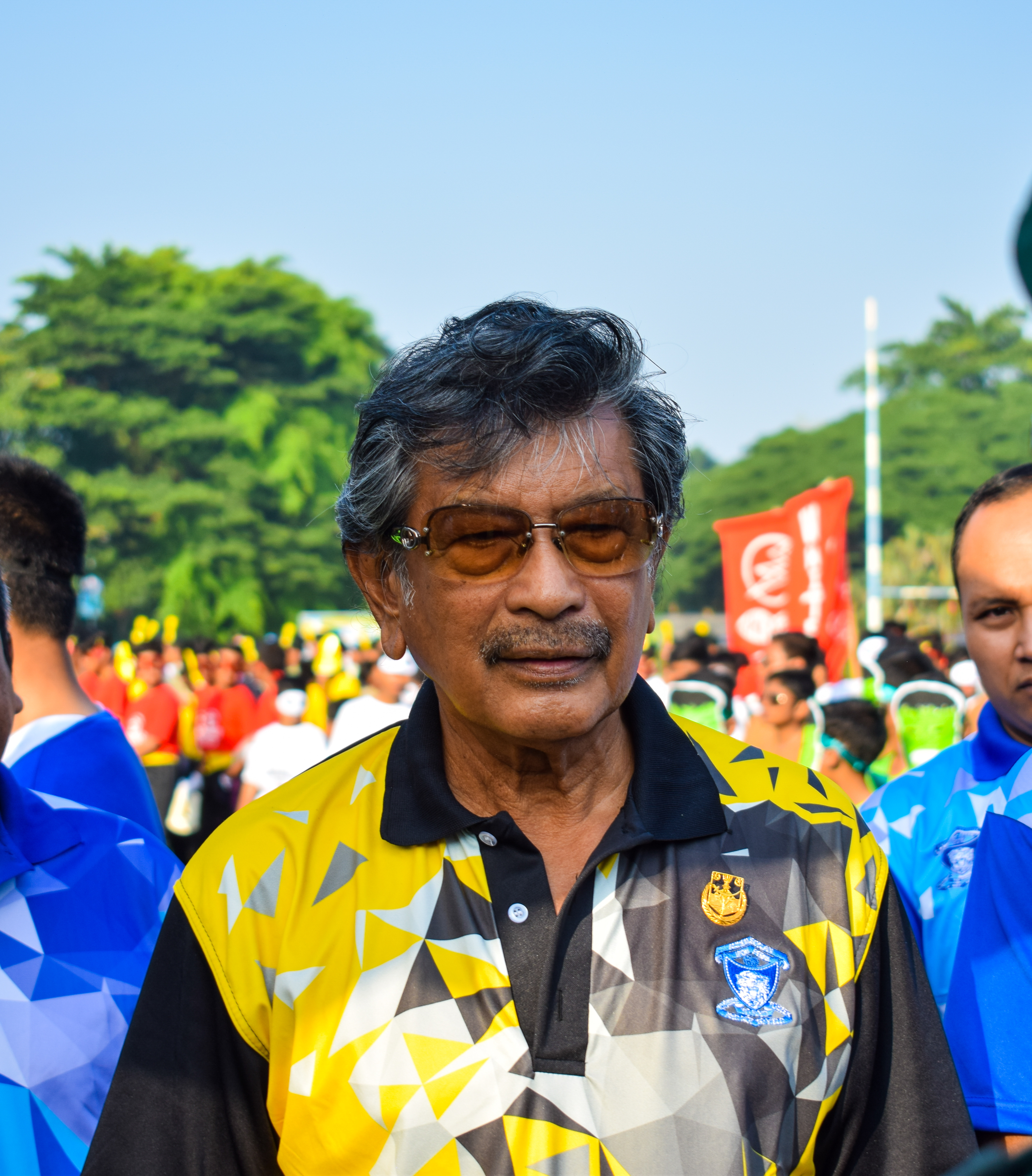
- Raja Ja'afar attending the 100th centennial sports carnival of Sekolah Menengah Kebangsaan Anderson in 2018

Crown Prince of Perak
- Incumbent: 20 June 2014 – present
- Predecessor: Nazrin Shah of Perak
- Born: 26 September 1941 (age 85); Taiping Hospital, Taiping, Perak
- Spouse: Raja Nor Mahani (m. 1973; died 2017) Che’ Puan Hazleza Ishak (m. 2002; died 2002) Raja Nazhatul Shima (m. 2019)
- Issue: Raja Shah Azman; Raja Nor Azwina
Names
- Raja Ja'afar ibni Almarhum Raja Muda Musa
- House: House of Perak
- Father: Raja Muda Musa ibni Abdul Aziz al-Mu’tasim Billah Shah of Perak|Almarhum Sultan Abdul Aziz Al-Mustasim Billah Shah Nikmatullah
- Mother: Che’ Puan Mariam binti Abdullah
- Religion: Sunni Islam

Raja Ja'afar ibni Almarhum Raja Muda Musa (Jawi: راج جعفر ابن المرحوم راج مودا موسى; born 26 September 1941) is the Raja Muda (Crown Prince) of Perak since 20 June 2014.

== Early life and education ==
He was born on 26 September 1941 at Taiping Hospital, Taiping, Perak in the Federated Malay States during the Japanese occupation. Raja Jaafar is the son of Perak Raja Muda Musa ibni Al-Marhum Sultan Abdul Aziz and his first wife, Che' Puan Mariam binti Abdullah. He had his early education at Anderson School, Ipoh and Anglo-Chinese School, Teluk Intan before studying for his bachelor's degree at Universiti Malaya and then his master's degree in Public Administration at Cornell University, United States.

== Government service ==
Raja Ja'afar has wide experience in public administration. He joined the Perak State Secretariat in 1966, served in the District & Land Office from 1966 to 1971. From 1976 to 1979, he was a management consultant at the Prime Minister's Office. He was an under-secretary at the Higher Education Division of the Education Ministry from 1979 to 1984, and then secretary of the Foreign Investment Committee at the Economic Planning Unit and deputy secretary-general (Development and Finance) of the Defence Ministry before retiring from government service in 1996.

== Raja DiHilir of Perak ==
Raja Jaafar was sworn in as Raja DiHilir of Perak on 10 March 1998, after he was appointed by the Dewan Negara Perak to replace Raja Ahmad Hisham Raja Abdul Malek, who died on 21 September 1997.

== Raja Muda of Perak ==
As senior prince, Raja Ja'afar ibni Almarhum Raja Muda Musa was sworn in as the crown prince of Perak on 1 July 2014.

== Personal life ==
His first wife was Raja Puan Besar of Perak Raja Nor Mahani binti Almarhum Raja Shahar Shah (18 October 1942 – 3 October 2017); they have a son, Raja Shah Azman, and a daughter, Raja Nor Azwina.

Jaafar's second wife was former model Che’ Puan Hazleza Ishak (1976–2002), a divorcée with children whom he married in January 2002 in Thailand. On 11 October 2002, her body was found bound and gagged at the foot of a waterfall, with evidence suggesting she had been strangled and then thrown from a bridge in a jungle clearing. She had been dragged from her car and abducted in broad daylight on 6 October. Jaafar's first wife, Raja Nor Mahani, was detained and questioned by the police over the incident for six days and released without any charges. A bomoh, a palace aide, a carpenter and a fisherman were each sentenced to 20 years in prison for manslaughter while another bomoh was sentenced to 14 years.

After the death of his first wife, he married Raja Puan Mahkota of Perak Raja Nazhatul Shima on 12 January 2019. Following their marriage, she was granted the title of Raja Puan Besar of Perak. She had been widowed since the death of her first husband in 2017.

== Honours ==
- Perak
  - Recipient of the Royal Family Order of Perak (DK)
  - Member First Class of the Azlanii Royal Family Order (DKA)
  - Grand Knight of the Order of Cura Si Manja Kini (SPCM) – Dato' Seri (1985)
- Malaysia
  - Companion of the Order of Loyalty to the Crown of Malaysia (JSM)

Raja Jaafar ibni Amarhum Raja Muda Musa Istana Al-Ridhuan Ipoh Born: 26 September 1941
Malaysian royalty
Regnal titles
Preceded by Raja Ahmad Hisham ibni Almarhum Raja Abdul Malek	Raja Di-Hilir of Perak (Deputy Crown Prince) 2nd position 21 September 1998 - 19 June 2014	Incumbent; Heir: Raja Azlan Muzzaffar Shah
Preceded by Nazrin Shah of Perak	Raja Muda of Perak (Crown Prince); Line of succession to the throne of Perak; 1st position 20 June 2014 - Present	Incumbent; Heir: Raja Iskandar Dzurkarnain
