= Tajul Ariffin Shah of Perak =

Sultan of Perak (died 1594)

Tajul Ariffin تاج العارفين
- Sultan of Perak

Sultan of Perak
- Reign: 1584–1594
- Predecessor: Ahmad Tajuddin Shah
- Successor: Alauddin Shah
- Died: 1594
- Burial: Pulau Semat, Kuala Kangsar
- Spouse: Putri Ajaib
Regnal name
- Paduka Sri Sultan Tajul Ariffin ibni Almarhum Sultan Mansur Shah I (ڤادوكا سري سلطان تاج العارفين ابن المرحوم منصور شاه ڤرتام)
Posthumous name
- Marhum Mangkat di Tebing (مرحوم مڠكت د تبيڠ)
- House: Perak
- Father: Mansur Shah I
- Religion: Sunni Islam

Tajul Ariffin ibni Almarhum Sultan Mansur Shah I (Jawi: ڤادوكا سري سلطان تاج العارفين ابن المرحوم منصور شاه ڤرتام; died 1594) was the fourth sultan of Perak. He was the son of the second sultan of Perak, Mansur Shah I, and brother of his predecessor, Ahmad Tajuddin Shah.

Tajul Ariffin resided in an area called Semat located between Manong and Kuala Kangsar. He ruled Perak for 10 years from 1584 until his death in 1594.

When Tajul Ariffin died, his body was buried in Pulau Semat, Kuala Kangsar and was known as Marhum Mangkat di Tebing. Next to his tomb, there is also the tomb of his wife Putri Ajaib. There is also not much information available about the life and reign of Tajul Ariffin.

Tajul Ariffin Shah of Perak House of Melaka-Perak Died: 1594
Regnal titles
Preceded by Ahmad Tajuddin Shah	Sultan of Perak; 1584–1594	Succeeded by Alauddin Shah
