= Yussuf Izzuddin Shah of Perak =

Sultan of Perak (r. 1948–1963)

Yusuf Izzuddin Shah
- Marhum Ghafarullah
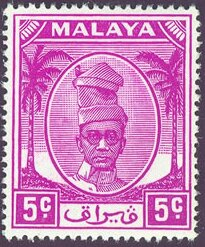
- Yusuf Izzuddin Shah on a 1954 stamp

Sultan of Perak
- Reign: 31 March 1948 – 4 January 1963
- Installation: 16 April 1949
- Predecessor: Abdul Aziz al-Mu’tasim Billah Shah of Perak
- Successor: Idris Iskandar al-Mutawakkil Alallahi Shah of Perak
- Born: 15 January 1890; Bukit Chandan, Kuala Kangsar, Perak, British Malaya
- Died: 4 January 1963 (aged 72); Istana Iskandariah, Bukit Chandan, Kuala Kangsar, Perak, Malaya
- Burial: 5 January 1963; Al-Ghufran Royal Mausoleum, Kuala Kangsar, Perak, Malaya
- Spouse: Raja Ta’ayah Binti Almarhum Raja Abdul Hamid
- Issue: Raja Ekram (Raja Di-Hilir of Perak); Raja Zairan; Raja Pok Saidatuliz; Raja Dato' Seri Baharom Shah; Raja Azlan Shah (Raja Kecil Tengah of Perak; then Sultan from 1984 to 2014)
Names
- Sultan Yussuff Izzuddin Shah Ibni Almarhum Sultan Abdul Jalil Karamatullah Nasiruddin Mukhataram Shah Radziallah Hu'an-hu
- House: Siak-Perak
- Father: Sultan Abdul Jalil Karamatullah Nasiruddin Mukhataram Shah Ibni Almarhum Sultan Idris Murshidul Azzam Shah Rahmatullah
- Mother: Che Yong Sofia Binti Muhammad Yunus
- Religion: Sunni Islam

Sultan Yussuf Izzuddin Shah Ibni Almarhum Sultan Abdul Jalil Karamatullah Nasiruddin Mukhataram Shah Radziallah Hu'an-hu, KCMG OBE (15 January 1890 – 4 January 1963) was the 32nd sultan of Perak, whilst it was a part of the Federation of Malaya.

== Early life and education ==
Raja Yussuf was born on 15 January 1890 at Bukit Chandan, Kuala Kangsar, Perak. He was the eldest son of Sultan Abdul Jalil Nasiruddin Mukhataram Shah. Raja Yussuf was educated at Hogan School (later changed to Clifford School), Kuala Kangsar. He was appointed Raja Di Hilir in 1919 and became Raja Bendahara in 1921.

== Sultan of Perak ==
In 1938, upon the death of his uncle, Sultan Iskandar Shah, he was appointed as Raja Muda (crown prince). Raja Yusuf ascended the Perak throne in 1948 following the death of his cousin Sultan Abdul Aziz al-Mu’tasim Billah Shah.

== Death ==
He died in 1963, ten weeks after the stroke which partially paralysed him, at the age of 72. He was interred at the Al-Ghufran Royal Mausoleum on Bukit Chandan and was given the posthumous title of Marhum Ghafarullah. He was succeeded by his cousin Sultan Idris Iskandar Al-Mutawakkil Alallahi Shah.

== Legacy ==
Sekolah Izzuddin Shah, Ipoh is the first Islamic boys' boarding school in Malaysia and was sponsored by Perak State Government before being taken over by KPM. Has been founded by the first Menteri Besar of Perak. Among the famous islamic school in Perak even in Malaysia.

SMK Sultan Yussuf in Batu Gajah and Sultan Yusuf Bridge in Batak Rabit is named in his honor.

== Honours ==
=== Honours of Perak ===
- Founding Grand Master of the Royal Family Order of Perak (12 December 1957 – 4 January 1963)
- Founding Grand Master of the Order of the Perak State Crown (12 December 1957 – 4 January 1963)

=== Honour of Malaya ===
- Malaya
  - Recipient of the Order of the Crown of the Realm (DMN) (31 August 1958)

=== Foreign Honours ===
- United Kingdom
  - Honorary Knight Commander of the Order of St Michael and St George (KCMG) – Sir

Malaysian royalty
Regnal titles
Preceded by Sultan Abdul Aziz Al-Mutasim Billah Shah Ibni Almarhum Raja Musa	Sultan of Perak; 1948–1963	Succeeded by Sultan Idris Iskandar Al-Mutawakkil Alallahi Shah Ibni Almarhum Sultan Iskandar Shah Kaddasullah
