= Mansur Shah I of Perak =

Sultan of Perak (1549–1577)

Mansur Shah I منصور شاه ڤرتام
- Sultan of Perak

Sultan of Perak
- Reign: 1549–1577
- Predecessor: Muzaffar Shah I
- Successor: Ahmad Tajuddin Shah
- Born: Raja Mansur
- Disappeared: 1577; Kota Lama Kanan, Kuala Kangsar, Perak Sultanate
- Spouse: daughter of a Batin
- Issue: Alauddin Mansur Syah of Aceh; Ahmad Tajuddin Shah of Perak; Tajul Ariffin of Perak
Names
- Raja Mansur ibni Almarhum Sultan Muzaffar Shah I (راج منصور ابن المرحوم سلطان مظفر شاه ڤرتام)
Regnal name
- Paduka Sri Sultan Mansur Shah I ibni Almarhum Sultan Muzaffar Shah I (ڤادوق سري سلطان منصور شاه ڤرتام ابن المرحوم سلطان مظفر شاه ڤرتام)
Posthumous name
- Marhum Kota Lama Kanan (مرحوم كوتا لاما كانن)
- House: Perak
- Father: Muzaffar Shah I
- Mother: Tun Terang
- Religion: Sunni Islam

Paduka Sri Sultan Mansur Shah I ibni Almarhum Sultan Muzaffar Shah I (Jawi: ڤادوق سري سلطان منصور شاه ڤرتام ابن المرحوم سلطان مظفر شاه ڤرتام; disappeared 1577) was the second sultan of Perak. He was the son of Muzaffar Shah I and Tun Terang, daughter of Tun Fatimah and Tun Ali.

== Reign ==
According to the Sejarah Raja Perak, Mansur Shah I accompanied by Bendahara Megat Terawis went to Ulu Perak and established the northern border of Perak with Reman. The boundary was marked by Mansur on a large stone in a place called Tapong and the large stone used as a boundary stone was called Batu Belah. The determination of the boundaries between Perak and Reman was agreed upon by the leaders of Reman here up to the 18th century.

The tin mines around the Kelian Intan area in Ulu Perak were included in Perak and Mansur Shah I appointed a representative to collect taxes from the miners. Since then, Perak began to develop and became rich due to tax collection from the tin mines, especially from the Kelian Intan area.

During his reign, the Siamese had come to attack Perak. They had landed at Pangkalan Lumut and had fought with the people of Perak under the leadership of the son-in-law of Mansur Shah I named Raja Ali. In the end, Perak lost to Siam, and Raja Ali was killed in the area that is now known as Setiawan. Since then, Perak began sending the bunga mas tribute to the Siamese every year and Perak allowed the Siamese to buy tin without charging any tax.

According to the Sejarah Aceh, during the reign of Ali Ri'ayat Syah I of Aceh, the Acehnese army defeated Perak in 1573. Mansur Shah I, his wife, and son were captured and taken to Aceh. Upon reaching there, the eldest son of Mansur Shah I, Raja Alauddin, was married to an Acehnese princess named Raja Putri. When there were no adult descendants of Ali Mughayat Shah, Raja Alauddin was made Sultan of Aceh with the title Sultan Alauddin Mansur Syah. Not long after that, Mansur Shah I was sent back by Aceh to Perak to rule and became a vassal of Aceh.

However, in the Sejarah Raja Perak, it is stated that Mansur Shah I was not actually captured and taken to Aceh together with his family. Only one of his sons was brought and after being appointed Sultan of Aceh, he sent his people to take Mansur Shah I to Aceh. Before Mansur Shah I was brought to Aceh, he married the daughter of a Batin (indigenous chief) in Kuala Kinta, and from the offspring of Mansur's son with an indigenous woman, it is said that the "Panglima Kinta", the Orang Besar of Perak in the Kinta District was born.

== Disappearance ==
It is presumed that Mansur Shah I died in Perak in 1577, though the story passed down from generation to generation regarding his death is quite mysterious. The story of the death of Mansur Shah I is not officially known and it is only said that he disappeared after performing Friday prayers at the Kota Lama Kanan Mosque. Ever since the incident of Mansur Shah I disappearing after Friday prayers, the people began to think that Mansur Shah I had died and he had been posthumously given the title of Marhum Kota Lama Kanan.

In 1916 during the reign of Idris Murshidul Azzam Shah, a mosque was rebuilt on the site of the Kota Lama Kanan Mosque in commemoration of Mansur Shah I, and a monumental tombstone was placed in the first row of the mosque.

Mansur Shah I of Perak House of Melaka-Perak Died: 1577 or after
Regnal titles
Preceded by Muzaffar Shah I	Sultan of Perak; 1549–1577	Succeeded by Ahmad Tajuddin Shah
