= Abdul Jalil Nasiruddin Muhtaram Shah of Perak =

Sultan of Perak (r. 1916–1918)

Abdul Jalil
- Marhum Radziallah

Sultan of Perak
- Reign: 17 January 1916 − 26 October 1918
- Installation: 7 September 1916
- Predecessor: Idris Murshidul Azzam Shah of Perak
- Successor: Iskandar of Perak
- Born: 23 April 1868
- Died: 26 October 1918 (aged 50); Istana Negara, Bukit Chandan, Kuala Kangsar, Perak, British Malaya
- Burial: Al-Ghufran Royal Mausoleum, Kuala Kangsar, Perak, British Malaya
- Spouse: Raja Nuteh Zahra (Jahrah) Binti Almarhum Sultan Ali Al-Mukammal Inayat Shah Nabiallah
- Issue: Raja Yussuff (Raja Bendahara of Perak); Raja Khalifa; Raja Ambin; Raja Alias; Raja Aman Shah; Raja Ambin; Raja Zubaida (Tengku Ampuan of Selangor); Raja Alawiya; Raja Khadija
Names
- Sultan Abdul Jalil Karamatullah Nasiruddin Mukhataram Shah Ibni Almarhum Sultan Idris Murshidul Azzam Shah Rahmatullah
- House: Siak-Perak
- Father: Sultan Idris Murshidul Azzam Shah Ibni Almarhum Raja Bendahara Alang Iskandar Teja
- Mother: Raja Nuteh Aisha Binti Almarhum Sultan Yusuf Sharifuddin Muzaffar Shah Ghafirullah
- Religion: Sunni Islam

Sultan Abdul Jalil Karamatullah Nasiruddin Mukhataram Shah Ibni Almarhum Sultan Idris Murshidul Azzam Shah Rahmatullah KCMG (23 April 1868 – 26 October 1918) was the 29th Sultan of Perak. Perak at the time was part of the British-administered Federated Malay States.

== Life ==
Born on 23 April 1868, he was the eldest son of Sultan Idris Murshidul Azzam Shah, by his first wife, Raja Nuteh Aishah who was the daughter of Sultan Yusuf of Perak.

=== Reign ===
Raja Abdul Jalil ascended to the Perak throne in 1916 following the death of his father.

== Death ==
Sultan Abdul Jalil's reign lasted 2 years and 10 months. He died on 26 October 1918 at age 50 and was interred next to his father at the Al-Ghufran Royal Mausoleum in Bukit Chandan. He was conferred the posthumous title of Marhum Radziallah. He was succeeded by his half-brother, Sultan Iskandar.

== Legacy ==
Sultan Abdul Jalil Bridge at Kuala Kangsar

The Sultan Abdul Jalil Shah Bridge which crosses the Perak River at Kuala Kangsar is named in his honour.

Sultan Abdul Jalil Shah Campus (KSAJS), Sultan Idris Education University at Tanjong Malim is also named in his honour.

Sekolah Menengah Kebangsaan Sultan Abdul Jalil Shah (SMKSAJS), A secondary school in Seberang Perak, Kampong Gajah was also named in his honour.

Preceded by Sultan Idris Murshidul Adzam Shah I Ibni Almarhum Raja Bendahara Alang Iskandar Teja	Sultan of Perak; 1916–1918	Succeeded by Sultan Iskandar Shah Ibni Almarhum Sultan Idris Murshidul Adzam Shah I Rahmatullah
