= Abdullah Muhammad Shah I of Perak =

Sultan of Perak (r. 1851–1857)

Sultan Abdullah Muhammad Shah I ibni Almarhum Raja Bendahara Abdul Rahman Shah I (Jawi: سلطان عبد الله محمد شاه ١ ابن المرحوم راج کچيل بسر عبد الرحمن) was the 22nd sultan of Perak reigning from 1851 to 1857.

== Early history ==
Sultan Abdullah Muhammad Shah I was the grandson of the 18th-century Sultan of Perak, Sultan Ahmaddin Shah ibni Almarhum Sultan Muhammad Shah. He ascended to the throne in 1851 after the death of his cousin, Sultan Shahabuddin Riayat Shah.

During his reign, he was involved in a civil war with Raja Muda Ngah Jaafar, who escaped Sultan Abdullah I his palace in Durian Sebatang and sought refuge in the residences of Datuk Laksamana Tok Janggut's residence.

With Sultan Abdullah I in exile, Raja Ngah Jaafar was appointed as the de facto Perak Sultan by the influential Malay ruler who sided with Sultan Abdullah in 1853. Edmund Augustus Blundell, the British Governor of the Straits Settlements, was informed of this by Raja Ngah Jaafar, who in turn was presented to the British in India. Raja Lop Yusuf, the eldest son of Sultan Abdullah I, tried to persuade the Malay leaders to continue their support to his father but failed. Sultan Abdullah I wrote to Blundell about the crisis in Perak on 23 November 1855, and also to seek help from the British. However, the request was rejected on the grounds that the British had promised not to intervene in Perak's internal affairs.

On 8 November 1856, Raja Ngah Jaafar, who was the de facto Sultan, was awarded another letter to continue to control the Long Jaafar district of Larut, which is rich in tin ore. In the same year, Raja Ngah Jaafar was declared the new Sultan of Perak by the regnal name Sultan Ja'far Mua'azzam Shah.

== Family ==
He married Raja Sharifah Ngah Aminah binti Raja Alang Rawin. They had 3 sons, Raja Lob Yusuf (later became the 27th Sultan of Perak, Sultan Yusuf Sharifuddin Muzaffar Shah, died in Sayong, Kuala Kangsar), Raja Sulaiman (died in Ligor) and Raja Pandak Abdul Rahman.

== Death ==
Sultan Abdullah I died in 1857 and was buried in Durian Sebatang in the county of Perak. He was posthumously conferred "Marhum Itikadullah".

Preceded by Sultan Shahabuddin Riayat Shah	Sultan of Perak; 1851–1857	Succeeded by Sultan Ja'afar Safiuddin Mu'adzam Shah
