= Sultan of Perak =

Ruler of Perak

- Sultan Perak سلطان ڤيراق
- State
- Arms of His Royal Highness the Sultan of Perak

Incumbent
- Nazrin Muizzuddin Shah, Sultan of Perak since 29 May 2014

Details
- Style: His Royal Highness
- Heir presumptive: Raja Jaafar
- First monarch: Sultan Muzaffar Shah
- Formed: 1528; 498 years ago
- Residences: Istana Iskandariah, Kuala Kangsar
- Website: sultan.perak.gov.my

The Sultan of Perak (Malay: Sultan Perak, Jawi: سلطان ڤيراق) is the constitutional monarch and head of state of the Malaysian state of Perak. It is one of the oldest hereditary seats among the Malay states. The current sultan of Perak, Sultan Nazrin Muizzuddin Shah, has been in office since 29 May 2014.

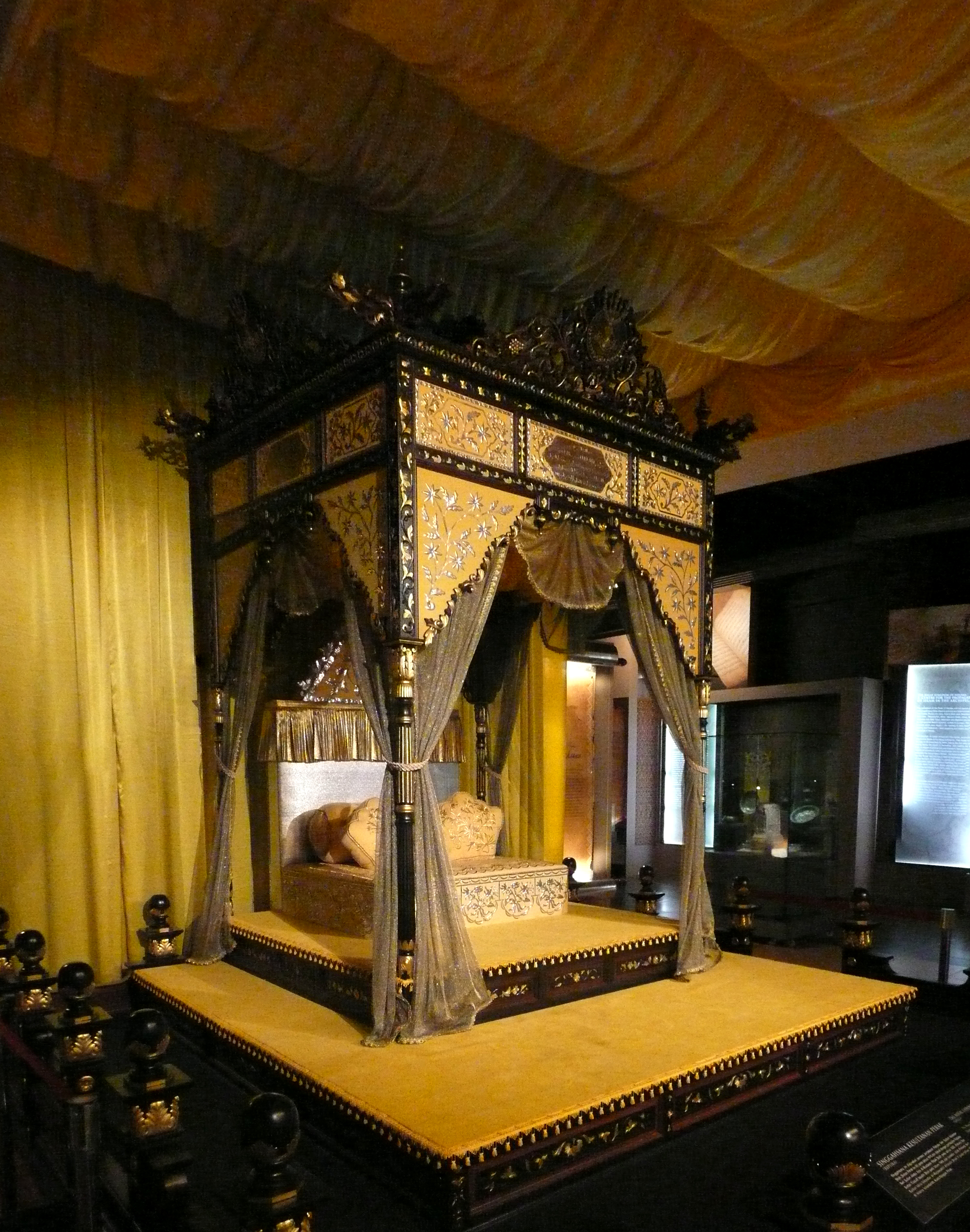
Replica of royal throne of Perak in National Museum

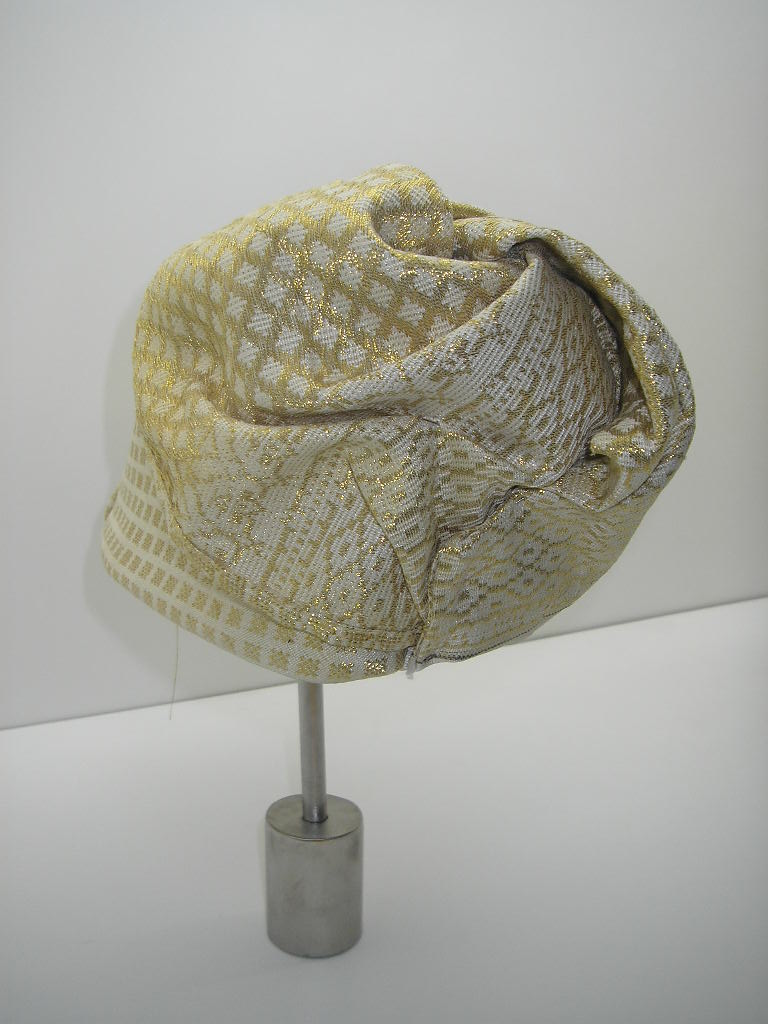
This white tengkolok embroidered with silver thread, tied in the style of Ayam Patah Kepak ("Rooster with Broken Wings"), is the headdress of the sultan of Perak.

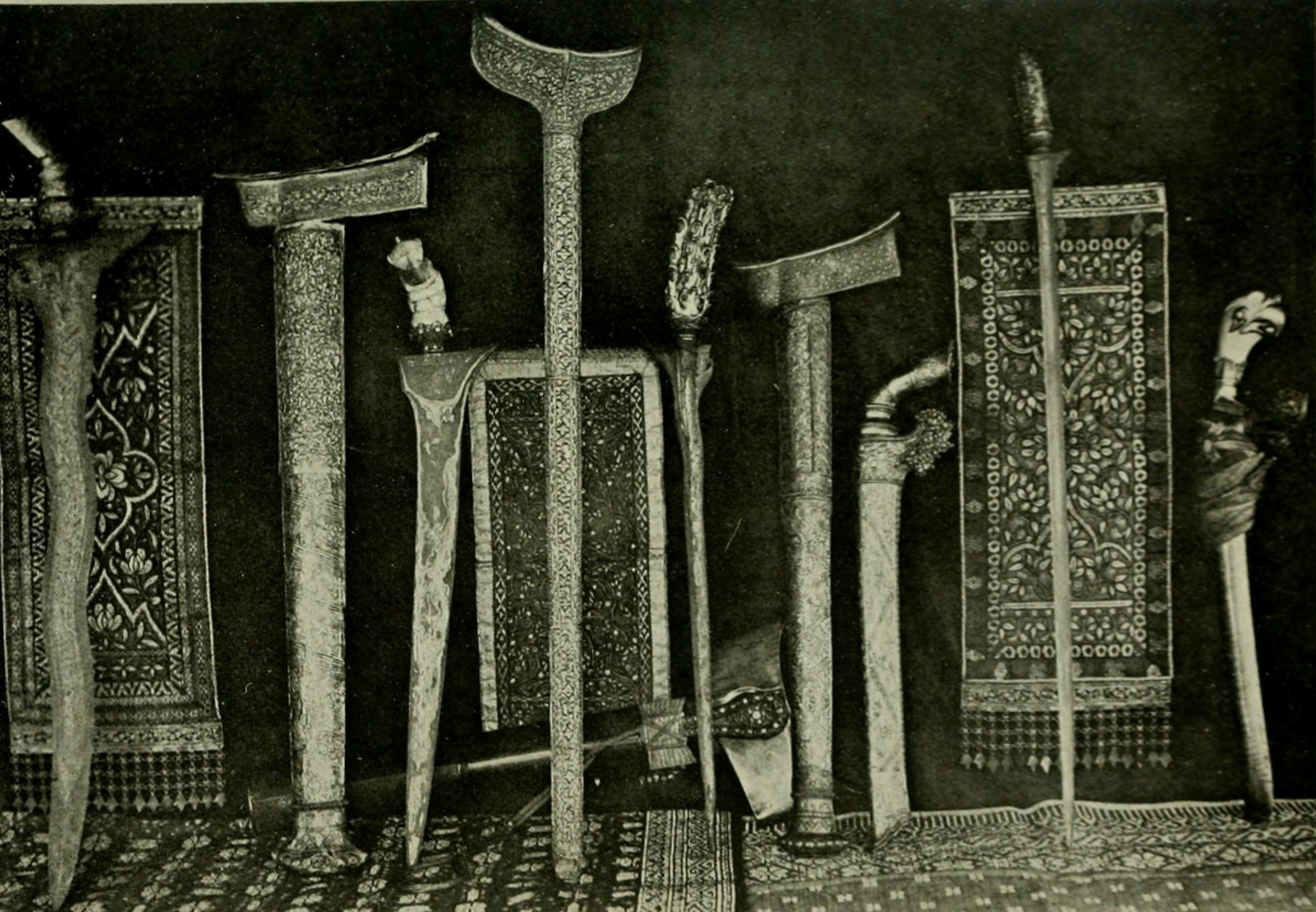
Perak royal regalia

When the Malacca Sultanate fell to Portugal in 1511, Sultan Mahmud Shah retreated to Kampar, Sumatra, and died there in 1528. He left behind two princes, Alauddin Riayat Shah II and Muzaffar Shah. The former established the Sultanate of Johor. Muzaffar Shah was invited to rule Perak, of which he became the first sultan.

== Line of succession to the Perak throne ==
In contrast to the other Malay sultanates, the ruling dynasty of Perak utilises a somewhat complex order of succession.

The reigning sultan (Raja Pemerintah) appoints princes in the male line of descent from a sultan to certain high princely titles (raja-raja bergelar). They are arranged in an order of precedence indicating the order of succession to the throne. As per ruling of 25 February 1953, the present hierarchy of titles, current holders of these titles and the corresponding order of succession is as follows:

1. Raja Muda (Heir Apparent, currently Raja Jaafar)
2. Raja di-Hilir (Deputy Heir Apparent, currently Raja Iskandar Dzulkarnain)
3. Raja Kecil Besar (currently Raja Azlan Muzzaffar Shah)
4. Raja Kecil Sulong (currently Raja Ahmad Nazim Azlan Shah)
5. Raja Kecil Tengah (currently Raja Iskandar)
6. Raja Kecil Bongsu (vacant)

While titleholders are usually appointed for life, titles may be revoked in cases of proven incompetence or disability. On the death or promotion of an existing titleholder, the holder of the next most senior title succeeds him. The Raja Muda is the heir apparent, and succeeds the ruling sultan on his death, whereupon the prince holding the title of Raja Di-Hilir becomes the new Raja Muda. The Raja Kechil Besar then becomes the Raja Di-Hilir. The new sultan may then appoint his own nominee to the junior-most title made vacant by these successions.

The 2 most senior titleholders are confirmed by a majority vote of the representatives of the Perak State Legislative Assembly.

== List of sultans of Perak ==
=== Malacca-Perak dynasty ===
Sultans of Perak
No.	Name	Reign
1	Muzaffar Shah I	1528–1549
2	Mansur Shah I	1549–1577
3	Ahmad Tajuddin Shah	1577–1584
4	Tajul Ariffin Shah I	1584–1594
5	Alauddin Shah	1594–1603
6	Mukaddam Shah	1603–1619
7	Mansur Shah II	1619–1627
8	Mahmud Shah I	1627–1630
9	Salehuddin Shah	1630–1636

=== Siak-Perak dynasty ===
No.	Name	Reign
10	Muzaffar Shah II	1636–1653
11	Mahmud Iskandar Shah	1653–1720
12	Alauddin Mughayat Shah	1720–1728
13	Muzaffar Riayat Shah III (Ruled Upper Perak)	1728–1752
14	Muhammad Mughayat Shah (Ruled Lower Perak)	1744–1750
15	Iskandar Zulkarnain	1752–1765
16	Mahmud Shah II	1765–1773
17	Alauddin Mansur Shah Iskandar Muda	1773–1786
18	Ahmaddin Shah	1786–1806
19	Abdul Malik Mansur Shah	1806–1825
20	Abdullah Mu’azzam Shah	1825–1830
21	Shahabuddin Riayat Shah	1830–1851
22	Abdullah Muhammad Shah I	1851–1857
23	Ja’afar Safiuddin Mu’azzam Shah	1857–1865
24	Ali Al-Mukammal Inayat Shah	1865–1871
25	Ismail Mu’abidin Riayat Shah	1871–1874
26	Abdullah Muhammad Shah II	1874–1876
27	Yusuf Sharifuddin Muzaffar Shah	1886–1887 (regent 1877–1886)
28	Idris Murshidul Azzam Shah	1887–1916
29	Abdul Jalil Karamatullah Nasiruddin Mukhataram Shah	1916–1918
30	Iskandar Shah	1918–1938
31	Abdul Aziz Al-Mu'tasim Billah Shah	1938–1948
32	Yussuf Izzuddin Shah	1948–1963
33	Idris Al-Mutawakil Alallahi Shah	1963–1984
34	Azlan Muhibbuddin Shah	1984–2014
35	Nazrin Muizzuddin Shah	2014–present

== Royal regalia ==
The Perak royal regalia consists of items that are said to have been with the Perak Sultanate from its inception, some of which pre-dating the Malacca Sultanate. The regalia is mainly used during the installation ceremony of Sultan of Perak and few other royal ceremonies.

- Royal headress (Tanjak Di-Raja)
- Royal aigrette (Aigrette Di-Raja)
- Royal tiara
- Royal sword Cura Si Manja Kini (Pedang Cura Si Manja Kini)
- Royal blade Taming Sari (Keris Taming Sari)
- Royal blade Sari Gading (Keris Sari Gading)
- Mestika Embun – also known as 'Ball of Petrified Dew'. Given to Sultan Muzaffar Riayat Shah I on his installation as the first Sultan of Perak by Tok Temong, a local official.
- Mohor Kecil Cap Halilintar – seal made of silver that is placed behind the right ear of the sultan during the installation ceremony.
- Royal Musical Ensemble (Nobat)
- Pontoh – golden armlets worn by the sultan and his consort around both arms during the installation ceremony.
- Agok – golden pendant worn the queen consort during the installation ceremony.
- Dokoh – golden brooch worn by the queen consort during the installation ceremony.
- Royal seal (Mohor Raja)
- Royal coat of arms (Jata Di-Raja)
- Panji Di-Raja
- Royal umbrella (Payung Di-Raja)
- State umbrella (Payung Kerajaan Negeri)
- State spear (Lembing Kerajaan Negeri Perak)
- Kancing Halkah – decorative ornament worn around the neck of a tunic, believed to be a gift from the Emperor of China (presumably the Yongle Emperor) to Parameswara of Malacca.
- Sundang Keris Panjang
- Baur-Baur Orang Besar Negeri
- Kamar
- Rantai Bunga Nyiur
- Geluk
- Puan – Betel leaves container. Originally presented to Tok Temong by Sultan Muzaffar Riayat Shah I on his installation as the first Sultan of Perak but later returned to be royal regalia of Perak.
- Batil Emas

== Royal orders and decorations ==
The following is the orders, decorations, and medals given by Sultan of Perak. When applicable, post-nominal letters and non-hereditary titles are indicated.

- The Most Esteemed Royal Family Order of Perak (Darjah Kerabat Yang Amat Dihormati): founded by Sultan Yussuf Izzuddin Shah in 1957. Conferred on members of the Perak and foreign royal houses.
- The Most Esteemed Perak Royal Family Order of Sultan Azlan Shah (Darjah Kerabat Seri Paduka Sultan Azlan Shah Perak Yang Dihormati): founded by Sultan Azlan Shah in 2000. Conferred on members of the Perak and foreign royal houses.
- The Most Esteemed Azlanii Royal Family Order (Darjah Kerabat Azlanii Yang Dihormati) founded by Sultan Azlan Shah in 2010. Awarded in two classes :
  - First Class – Darjah Kerabat Azlanii
  - Second Class – Darjah Kerabat Azlanii II
- The Most Esteemed Perak Order of Sultan Azlan Shah (Darjah Kebesaran Seri Paduka Sultan Azlan Shah Perak Yang Amat Dimulia): founded by Sultan Azlan Shah in 2000. Conferred for distinguished services to the Sultan of Perak.
- The Most Esteemed Perak Order of Sultan Nazrin Shah (Darjah Kebesaran Seri Paduka Sultan Nazrin Shah Perak Yang Amat Dimulia): founded by Sultan Nazrin Shah.
- The Most Illustrious Order of Cura Si Manja Kini (Darjah Yang Amat Mulia Paduka Cura Si Manja Kini): founded by Sultan Idris Iskandar Al-Mutawakkil Alallahi Shah II in 1969 and later 1989. Awarded in four classes:
  - Grand Knight or Dato'Seri – Darjah Dato' Seri Paduka Cura Si Manja Kini
  - Knight or Dato' – Darjah Dato' Paduka Cura Si Manja Kini
  - Commander or Ahli Paduka – Darjah Ahli Paduka Cura Si Manja Kini
  - Member or Ahli – Darjah Ahli Cura Si Manja Kini
- The Most Valliant Order of Taming Sari (Darjah Yang Amat Perkasa Taming Sari): founded by Sultan Idris Iskandar Al-Mutawakkil Alallahi Shah II in 1977. Awarded to military and police personnel in six classes :
  - Dato' Seri Panglima – Darjah Dato' Seri Panglima Taming Sari
  - Dato' Pahlawanan – Darjah Dato' Pahlawan Taming Sari
  - Ahli Perwira – Darjah Ahli Perwira Taming Sari
  - Ahli Hulubalang – Darjah Ahli Hulubalang Taming Sari
  - Ahli Kesatria – Darjah Ahli Kesatria Taming Sari
  - Ahli Perajurit – Darjah Ahli Perajurit Taming Sari
- The Most Illustrious Order of the Perak State Crown (Darjah Yang Amat Mulia Paduka Mahkota Perak): founded by Sultan Yussuf Izzuddin Shah in 1957. Awarded in four classes:
  - Knight Grand Commander or Dato' Seri – Darjah Dato' Seri Paduka Mahkota Perak
  - Knight Commander or Dato' – Darjah Dato' Paduka Mahkota Perak
  - Commander or Ahli Paduka – Darjah Ahli Paduka Mahkota Perak
  - Member or Ahli – Darjah Ahli Mahkota Perak
- The Conspicuous Gallantry Medal (Pingat Keberanian Handal): instituted by Sultan Yussuf Izzuddin Shah in 1951 as a reward for conspicuous gallantry and heroism. Awarded in a single class, originally a silver medal but now a four-pointed enamelled star. Bars may be awarded to signify subsequent acts of gallantry.
- The Distinguished Conduct Medal (Pingat Pekerti Terpilih): instituted by Sultan Yussuf Izzuddin Shah in 1951 to reward conspicuous bravery. Awarded in a single class, bronze medal. Bars may be awarded to signify subsequent acts of bravery.
- The Meritorious Service Medal (Pingat Jasa Kebaktian): instituted by Sultan Yussuf Izzuddin Shah in 1951 to reward meritorious public service in state employ. Awarded in a single class, bronze medal.
- The Long Service Medal (Pingat Lama Perkhidmatan): instituted by Sultan Idris Iskandar Al-Mutawakkil Alallahi Shah II in 1969 to reward long service in state employ of at least twenty-five years continuous duration. Awarded in a single class, bronze medal.

== Genealogy tree ==
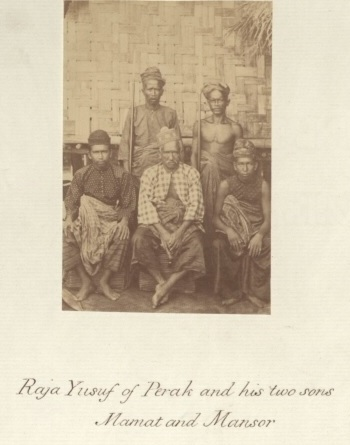
Sultan Yusuf Sharifuddin Mudzaffar Shah (center) with his two sons, Mamat and Mansor, circa 1860–1900

Genealogy of the Sultan of Perak
- Sultan Muzaffar Shah II (1636–1654) – Marhum Jalilu'llah
  - Sultan Mahmud Iskandar Shah (1654–1720), né Raja Mahmud, son of Sultan Mudzaffar Shah and Puteri Fatimah Puteh, grandson of Raja Abdullah and Puteri Perak, Great-grandson of Sultan Abdul Ghafor (Sultan Pahang 12) and Raja Bonda (daughter of Sultan Saiful Rijal, Sultan of Brunei)
  - Paduka Sri Tuanku Sultan Mansur Shah, Yang di-Pertuan Muda. + before 1720, having had seven sons :
    - Sultan 'Ala' ud-din Mughayat Ri'ayat Shah (1720–1728) – né Paduka Sri Tuanku Raja Radin, Raja Muda,
      - Raja Kechil Bongsu.
      - Raja Kechil Ampuan.
        oo ca. 1750, Sultan Mahmud Shah ibni al-Marhum Sultan Muhammad Shah Aminu'llah, Sultan and Yang di-Pertuan Besar of Perak (d. 17 June 1773), third son of Sultan Muhammad Shah Aminu'llah, Sultan and Yang di-Pertuan Besar of Perak.
    - Sultan Muzaffar Shah III Johan Berdaulat Per Alam Jalalu'llah (1728–1742 and 1750–1754) – Marhum Hajiu'llah, né Paduka Sri Tuanku Raja Inu, Raja Muda, of Bernam
    - Raja 'Abdu'l-Jalil
    - Raja Daha, Raja Kechil Muda. + after 1752,
    - Sultan Muhammad Shah (1742–1750) – Marhum Aminu'llah, né Raja Vishnu [Raja Bisnu]
      - Sultan Iskandar Zulkarnain Inayat Shah (1754–1765) – Marhum Kaharu'llah, né Paduka Sri Tuanku Raja Iskandar, Raja Muda
        - Raja 'Abdu'l Rahman ibni al-Marhum Sultan Iskandar Zulkarnain . b. at Istana Merchu 'Alam, Pulau Indira Sakti, ca. 1755 (s/o Raja Budak Rasul).
      - Sultan Mahmud Shah II (1765–1773) – Marhum Muda, né Raja Saleh, Raja Kimas
        Raja Kechil Muda 1750, Heir Apparent (Tuanku Raja Muda, Wakil us-Sultan, Wazir ul-Azam) 1764. Removed his capital to Pasir Pulai, which he renamed Pulau Besar Indra Mulia. oo ca. 1750, the Raja Kechil Ampuan,
        - Raja Ibrahim – al-Marhum Sayong, Raja Bendahara. Granted the title of Raja Kechil Muda, and prom. Raja Bendahara Wakil us-Sultan Wazir al-Kabir. Dead before 1786
          - Raja Mahmud, Raja Bendahara. Granted the title of Raja Kechil Bongsu Muda 1764, and prom. to Raja Bendahara Wakil us-Sultan Wazir al-Kabir 1786. Although the designated heir, he refused to come to Sulong to be recognised as ruler, leaving the body of his grand uncle unburied for three months, thus forfeiting the succession in 1792.
            - Non dynastic descent
      - Sultan 'Ala ud-din Mansur Shah (1773–1792) – Marhum Sulong, né Raja 'Ala ud-din, Raja Bendahara
      - Raja Inu [al-Marhum Tengah], Raja Bendahara. Granted the title of Raja di-Hiler 1752, and prom. to Raja Bendahara 1773.
        m. (first) Raja Che' Puan Tengah, daughter of Raja 'Abdu'l-Hamid ibni al-Marhum Sultan Mansur Shah.
        m. (second) the Che Puan Bendahara, of Labu Kubang Lanih. He had issue, two sons and two daughters:
        - Raja 'Abdu'l-Rahman bin Raja Inu (s/o Che' Puan Tengah). m. Raja Long Irang Juma'at binti Raja Chulan (she was k. by her husband as she came up from her bath), daughter of Paduka Sri Tuanku Raja Chulan bin Raja 'Abdu'l-Hamid, Raja Muda. He was k. by his father when about to run amok in the Palace.
        - Paduka Sri Tuanku Raja Radin Shahidu'llah bin Raja Inu, Raja Muda . Granted the title of Raja Bendahara, and appointed as Heir Apparent with the title of Paduka Sri Tuanku Raja Muda, Wakil us-Sultan, Wazir ul-Azam 1786. m. Raja Chu binti Raja Chulan ['Ungku Chu], Raja Che' Puan Besar, younger daughter of Raja Chulan bin Raja 'Abdu'l-Hamid, Raja Muda. He was k. in an attack by Inche' Sadan, at Fort Kepas, 1842, having had issue, one son and two daughters:
          - Raja 'Umar bin Raja Radin Shahidu'llah.
      - Sultan Ahmaddin Shah (1792–1806) – Marhum Bongsu, né Raja Ahmad, Raja Kechil Bongsu
        - Sultan 'Abdu'l-Malik Mansur Mu'azzam Shah (1806–1825) – Marhum Jamalu'llah, né Raja 'Abdu'l-Malik. Appointed to succeed his father three months after his death because the designated heir, Raja Bendahara Mahmud, would not come down to Sayong to be installed. Established his capital at Pasir Garam. Refused to accept Siamese sovereignty, but was forced to surrender to a large army sent by the Sultan of Kedah, on behalf of the Siamese King. Removed from exercising executive powers by the Sultan of Kedah, after 18 November 1818. Permitted to retain his titles for life, and forbidden from taking part in councils.
          - Raja Taj ud-din. Regent for his younger brother 1818–1825.
          - Sultan 'Abdu'llah Mu'azzam Shah (1825–1830) – Marhum Khalilu'llah, né Paduka Sri Tuanku Raja 'Abdu'llah, Raja Muda
          - Tuanku Ahmad Shah Johan Berdaulat Khalifatu'llah, Yang di-Pertuan Muda. Granted the title of Raja Kechil Tengah, prom. to Raja di-Hiler, and appointed as deputy ruler with the title of Paduka Sri Tuanku Yang di-Pertuan Muda 1806.
            - Sultan Ja'afar Safi ud-din Mu'azzam Shah (1857–1865) – Marhum Waliu'llah, né Raja Ngah Ja'afar. Granted the title of Raja Di-Hilir late 1826, prom to Raja Bendahara 1830, and appointed as Heir Apparent with the title of Paduka Sri Tuanku Raja Muda, Wakil us-Sultan, Wazir ul-Azam 1841. Succeeded 1857.
              - H.M Sultan 'Abdullah Muhammad Shah II of Perak (1874–1877) – Marhum Habibu'llah, né Raja 'Abdu'llah, Raja Muda, b. 21 September 1842. Appointed as Heir Apparent with the title of Tuanku Raja Muda, Wakil us-Sultan, Wazir ul-Azam, 1865. Went into rebellion and proclaimed himself Sultan, in opposition to Sultan Ismail, ca. 21 February 1872. Recognised as Sultan and Yang di-Pertuan together with the style of His Majesty, by the Treaty of Pangkor, 20 January 1874. Implicated in the murder of the British Resident J W W Burch. Deposed and exiled to the Seychelles on 30 March 1877, where he spent five years on the island of Félicité and before removing to Mahé. Allowed to return to Malaya and settled at Singapore 13 March 1895, later removed to Penang, before finally returning to Kuala Kangsar in 1912. Styled Ex-Sultan 'Abdu’llah Muhammad Shah Habibu’llah ibni al-Marhum Sultan Ja’afar Safi ud-din Mu’azzam Shah with the style of His Highness, after his abdication. A gifted artist and composer during his years of exile, including what became the Malaysian National Anthem in 1957.
                - Raja Chulan
                  - Raja Zainal Azman
                    - (6) Raja Izuddin Chulan Raja Kechil Bongsu
              - Raja Musa. Appointed as Heir Apparent with the title of Tuanku Raja Muda, Wakil us-Sultan, Wazir ul-Azam 12 January 1899. + 1906
                - Sultan Abdu'l-Aziz al-Mu'tasim Shah Billah KCMG, KBE (1938–1948) – Marhum Nik'matullah. b. 14 November 1887, Appointed as Heir Presumptive with the title of Raja Bendahara Wakil us-Sultan Wazir al-Kabir, 1 August 1918 and Heir Apparent with the title of Tuanku Raja Muda, Wakil us-Sultan, Wazir ul-Azam, 18 December 1918. Succeeded 14 October 1938. Proclaimed at Kuala Kangsar, 17 October 1938. Crowned at the Istana Iskandariah, Bukit Chandan, Kuala Kangsar, 4 March 1939. Rcvd: Silver Jubilee (1935), and Coron (1937) medals, and KC of the Order of the Crown of Siam (1924).
                  - Raja Dato' Musa, Raja Muda. b. 16 June 1919. Granted the title of Raja Kechil Bongsu 15 October 1938, prom. to Raja Kechil Muda 1 January 1940, Raja Kechil Sulong 1945, Raja Kechil Besar 1953, Raja di-Hiler 30 June 1962, and appointed as Heir Apparent with the title of Tuanku Raja Muda, Wakil us-Sultan, Wazir ul-Azam 1 March 1963. Hon ADC to the Sultan 1948. Rcvd: SPMP, JP, PJK, DYTM. He died at London, 12 May 1983. Eleven sons :
                    - a) (1) Commander DiRaja Dato' Sri Raja Muda Ja’afar . b. 26 September 1941. Raised to the titles of Raja Kechil Tengah 3 February 1984, Raja Kechil Sulong 1998, and Raja Di-Hilir 10 March 1998. Rcvd: DK (15.4.1998), SPCM (19.4.1986), JSM. new Raja Muda 20 June 2014. Rcvd: DK (20.6.2014)
                      - i) Raja Shah Azman
                    - b) Captain Raja Kobat Saleh ud-din [Roger Kobat]. b. at Taiping, 30 January 1943. Two daughters
                    - c) Raja Taj ud-din ibni al-Marhum Raja Muda Musa (s/o Mariam).
                    - d) Raja Saleh uz-Zaman ibni al-Marhum Raja Muda Musa (s/o Mariam), educ. Malay Coll, Kuala Kangsar.
                    - e) Raja 'Ala ud-din ibni al-Marhum Raja Muda Musa (s/o Mariam). Copyright©Christopher Buyers
                    - f) Raja Dato' 'Abdu’l Aziz ibni al-Marhum Raja Muda Musa (s/o Mariam) b. 1949, Rcvd: DPMP (23.4.2007), educ. Malay Coll, Kuala Kangsar. Two daughters and two sons.
                    - g) Raja Shahrir uz-Zaman ibni al-Marhum Raja Muda Musa. b. 1950 (s/o Rafida), educ. Malay Coll, Kuala Kangsar.
                    - h) Raja Muhammad Hatta . 3 children, 2 daughters
                    - i) Raja 'Abdu’l Rahman
                    - j) Raja 'Abdu’l Razak. Author and journalist.
                    - k) Raja Muzafar Shah. Rcvd: PMP (2008). One daughter
                - Raja Ja'afar Billah
            - Raja Alang Iskandar Shah – Marhum Kuala Teja, Raja Bendahara (cre. 1841)
              - Raja Hasan
                - Raja Ngah Ja'afar.
              - Raja Kulop Muhammad Kramat, of Kuala Dipang
                - Raja Ismail
                  - Raja Andak
              - Sultan Sir Idris Murshid al-Azzam Shah GCMG, GCVO (1887–1916) – Marhum Rahmatu'llah, né Raja Idris [Dris], Raja Muda,
                - Sultan 'Abdu’l Jalil Nasir ud-din Muhtaram KCMG, OBE ( – 20 January 1916 – November 1918) – Marhum Radziallah
                  - Sultan Yusuf Izz ud-din Rathiu’llah KCMG (15 January 1890 – 29 March 1948 – 4 January 1963) – Marhum Ghafarullah.
                    - Sultan 'Azlan Muhib ud-din Shah GCB, KStJ (19 April 1928 – 3 February 1984 – 28 May 2014). Granted the title of Raja Kechil Bongsu 19 August 1962, prom. to Raja Kechil Tengah 1 March 1963, Raja Kechil Sulong 1 January 1978, Raja Kechil Besar 1 August 1978, and appointed as Heir Apparent with the title of Tuanku Raja Muda, Wakil us-Sultan, Wazir ul-Azam 1 July 1983. Succeeded on the death of his uncle, 31 January 1984. Proclaimed at Ipoh, 3 February 1984. Crowned at Istana Kinta, Kuala Kangsar, 9 December 1985. Elected as Deputy Supreme Head of State with the title of Timbalan Yang di-Pertuan Agung, 9 February 1984. Installed at Istana Negara, Kuala Lumpur, 29 April 1984. Elected King of Malaysia with the title of Yang di-Pertuan Agung and style of Majesty, 2 March 1989. Crowned at Istana Negara, Kuala Lumpur, 26 April 1989. Left office and returned to Perak, 25 April 1994.
                      - Sultan Nazrin Mu-izz ud-din Shah (27 November 1956 – 29 May 2014 – ). Granted the title of Raja Kechil Besar 16 February 1984, and appointed as Heir Apparent with the title of Tuanku Raja Muda, Wakil us-Sultan, Wazir ul-Azam 15 April 1987. Regent of Perak from 26 April 1989 to 25 April 1994 and from 27 January 2008 to 28 May 2014. Succeeded on the death of his father, 28 May 2014.
                        Proclaimed in Kuala Kangsar, 29 May 2014. Crowned at the Balairong Seri, Istana Iskandariah, Bukit Chandan, Kuala Kangsar, 6 May 2015.
                        Rcvd: DK, DKSA (18.4.2005), SPCM (19.4.1986), SPTS (19.4.1989), SPMP of Perlis, DK II of Selangor (13.12.2003), etc. m. at the Balai Istiadat, Istana Iskandariah, Bukit Chandan, Kuala Kangsar, 17 May 2007, Tuanku Zara binti Salim, Raja Puan Besar (b. at Ipoh, 22 March 1973), invested with the title of Raja Puan Besar 18 May 2007, rcvd: DKSA (18.5.2007), DKA.
                        - (3) Raja Azlan Muzzaffar Shah. b. 14 March 2008, Raja Kechil Besar 20 Jun 2014, rcvd: SPMP, SPCM.
                        - Raja Nazira Safya. b. 2 August 2011
                      - Raja Dato' Seri Ashman Shah, Raja Kechil Sulong. b. 28 December 1958. Granted the title of Raja Kechil Bongsu 11 May 1987, and prom to Raja Kechil Tengah 10 March 1998, and prom to Raja Kechil Sulong 16 March 2010. Rcvd: SPCM (19.4.1988). He died following a severe attack of asthma, 30 March 2012
                        - (4) Raja Dato' Seri Ahmad Nazim Azlan Shah, Raja Kechil Sulong . b. 10 March 1994. Granted the title of Raja Kechil Tengah 18 March 2010. Rcvd: DKA II (24.4.2010). Raja Kechil Sulong 1.4.2012. Rcvd: SPCM
                    - Raja Ziran @ Raja Zaid (died 1979)
                      - (5) Raja Iskandar, Raja Kechil Tengah
                - Sultan Iskandar of Perak GCMG, KCVO (10 May 1881 – Nov 1918 – 14 October 1938) – Marhum Kadassallah
                  - Sultan Idris II al-Mutawakil Allahahi Shah CMG (12 August 1924 – 5 January 1963 – 31 January 1984) – Marhum Afifu’llah. b. 12 August 1924, as Raja Iris Shah. Granted the title of Raja di-Hiler 10 May 1934, prom to Raja Bendahara Wakil us-Sultan Wazir al-Kabir 15 October 1938, and appointed as Heir Apparent with the title of Tuanku Raja Muda, Wakil us-Sultan, Wazir ul-Azam 12 July 1948. Succeeded on the death of his cousin, 4 January 1963. Proclaimed 6 January 1963. Crowned at the Balarong Sri, Istana Iskandariah, Bukit Chandan, Kuala Kangsar, 26 October 1963.
                    - Raja Dato' Sri Yusuf 'Izz ud-din Iskandar Shah al-Haj . b. at Istana Raja Muda, Teluk Anson, 1954. Rcvd: SPCM (1.7.1983), DSAP. Granted the title of Raja Kechil Bongsu 1 March 1963, suspended for ten years 1978 but pardoned and reinstated 31 March 1979, prom to Raja Kechil Tengah 1 April 1979, prom to Raja Kechil Sulong 1 July 1983, and prom to Raja Kechil Besar 11 May 1987 (stripped of the title following a declaration of bankruptcy, 25 November 2006). m. Tengku Datin Sri Noor Hazah al-Hajjah binti Tengku 'Abdu’l Aziz Shah (b. 7 November 1955), Presdt Malaysian Netball Assoc (MNA), daughter of Tengku 'Abdu’l Aziz Shah ibni al-Marhum Sultan 'Ala ud-din Sulaiman Shah, Tengku Indra Setia di-Raja, of Selangor, by his second wife, Sharifa Hasnah binti Sayyid Zain Shahab ud-din. He had issue, two sons and three daughters:
                      - Raja Muzaffar Idris Shah [Ariezz]. b. at Ipoh, 28 December 19XX
                      - Raja Putra Muhamad Riza. b. at Ipoh, 13 December 1981
                    - (2) Raja Dato' Sri Haji Iskandar Zulkarnain . Granted the title of Raja Kechil Bongsu 3 February 1984, prom to Raja Kechil Tengah 11 May 1987, to Raja Kechil Sulong 10 March 1998, and to Raja Kechil Besar 18 March 2010. Rcvd: SPCM (1.7.1983), SSDK. new Raja Di-Hilir 20 June 2014. Rcvd: DK (20.6.2014)
                      - Raja Nabil Imran.
                      - Raja Idris Shah.
                      - Raja Siff ud-din.
                  - D.Raja Dato' Sri Ahmad Shiff ud-din Shah [Tengku Tam], Raja Muda. b. 1930. Granted the title of Raja Kechil Sulong 1982, and appointed as Heir Apparent with the title of Tuanku Raja Muda, Wakil us-Sultan, Wazir ul-Azam 3 February 1984. Rcvd: DK, SPCM (1.7.1983, DPCM), SPMK, JP. He died from heart failure, at the General Hospital, Kuala Trengganu, 12 April 1987 (bur. Royal Mausoleum, Bukit Chandan, Kuala Kangsar)
                    - Raja Ain ul-Azam. Rcvd: AMP (19.4.2002).
                    - Raja Najib ud-din
                    - Raja Saif ul-Adian
                    - Raja Khair ul-Annuar
                    - Raja Muhammad Alwi
                    - Raja Kamar Azhar
                    - Raja Iskandar Muda
                    - Raja Ismail Mudzaffar Shah
              - Raja Lope Ahmad
                - Raja Inu
                - Raja Zainal Rashid
                - Raja Muhammad Rashid
        - Raja Inu Muhammad Saleh, Raja Kechil Lasa
          - Sultan Shahab ud-din Ri'ayat Shah (1830–1851) – Marhum Safiu'llah, né Raja Chulan. Granted the title of Raja Kechil Muda 1786, prom. to Raja Bendahara, and appointed as Heir Apparent with the title of Paduka Sri Tuanku Raja Muda, Wakil us-Sultan, Wazir ul-Azam, 1826. Succeeded 20 December 1830.
            - Raja Mahmud, dead at a young age.
            - Sultan 'Ali al-Mukammil 'Inayat Shah (1865–1871) – Marhum Nabiu'llah, né Raja Ngah 'Ali. Appointed as Heir Apparent with the title of Tuanku Raja Muda, Wakil us-Sultan, Wazir ul-Azam, 1850. Succeeded, 20 March 1865. Installed 9 October 1865.
              - Raja 'Usman, Raja Bendahara Wakil us-Sultan Wazir al-Kabir (s/o Raja Puteh Zalikha). Appointed as Heir Presumptive with the title of Raja Bendahara Wakil us-Sultan Wazir al-Kabir 3 July 1871, becoming the first to be so styled. Regent of Perak 1876. + 1876
                - Raja Muhammad bin Raja 'Usman, Orang Kaya-Kaya Imam Paduka Tuan.
              - Raja 'Umar
                - Raja Ngah Abu Bakar. b. February 1870.
                  - Raja Mahadi
                    - Raja Musa OStJ (1957). b. 24 March 1903 Rcvd: Defence (1945) and Coron. (1953) medals.
                      - Raja 'Abdu'l-Aziz . b. 12 December 1940
                - Raja Muhammad Iskandar
                  - Raja Ngah 'Ali, Raja Kechil Tengah. Granted the title of Raja Kechil Bongsu 1 October 1941, and prom. to Raja Kechil Tenah 15 July 1948. Hon. ADC to the Sultan 1948. He died 12 May 1955
                    - Raja Othman
                      - Raja Amin ud-din. Two daughters
                      - (b) Raja Chulan
        - Raja 'Abdu'l-Rahman, Raja Bendahara. Granted the title of Raja Kechil Sulong Tua, prom. to Raja Kechil Bongsu 1825, and finally to Raja Bendahara 1826.
          - Sultan 'Abdu'llah Muhammad Shah I (1851–1857) – Marhum 'Atiku'llah, né Raja 'Abdu'llah. Granted the title of Raja Kechil Muda, prom. to Raja di-Hiler 1826, and finally Raja Bendahara late 1826.
            - Sultan Yusuf Sharif ud-din Muzaffar Shah (1877–1887) – Marhum Ghafiru'llah. Appointed as heir apparent with the title of Tuanku Raja Muda, Wakil us-Sultan, Wazir ul-Azam April 1875. Appointed as Regent of Perak with the style of His Highness, 30 March 1877. Crowned as Sultan, at Kuala Kangsar 11 May 1887.

== See also ==
- Agnatic seniority
- Family tree of Malaysian monarchs
- Family tree of Perak monarchs
- Makam Al-Ghufran (Perak Royal Mausoleum)
- Monarchies of Malaysia
- Sultan of Johor
- House of Siak-Perak
