= Megat Yunus =

Malaysian aristocrat and politician

Dato' Megat Yunus Megat Mohd Isa
- Born: Megat Yunus bin Megat Mohd Isa; 1907; Kota Lama Kanan, Kuala Kangsar, Perak
- Died: 1964 (aged 56–57); Kota Lama Kanan Mosque, Kuala Kangsar, Malaysia
- Occupations: Aristocrat, Politician
- Years active: 1927–1964
- Known for: Political Officer of UMNO; Signatory to Perak State Constitution (1948)
- Successor: Dato' Seri Megat Jaafar Bin Megat Yunus

Dato' Megat Yunus bin Megat Mohd Isa (1907–1964) was a Malaysian aristocrat and politician. He held the hereditary title of Orang Kaya Besar Maharaja Diraja of Perak, one of the Four Major Chiefs of the state.

== Early life ==
Yunus was born in 1907. He was the son of Megat Mohd Isa Bin Megat Ismail and Wan Rasiah Binti Temenggong Wan Hussain of Kota Lama Kanan, Kuala Kangsar, Perak. In 1927, at the age of 20, he was elected as a member of the Malayan Branch of the Royal Asiatic Society.

== Career ==
Prior to entering politics, Megat Yunus served in the Malayan Civil Service and also held the position of Justice of the Peace (J.P.).

He later became active in the early development of United Malays National Organisation (UMNO) in Perak, alongside Dato' Seri Dr Megat Khas and the late Dato' Panglima Bukit Gantang Abdul Wahab. He succeeded Zainul Abidin bin Haji Abbas as an officer in charge of UMNO's Department of Politics. In April 1947, he was appointed Political Officer of the UMNO.

In 1948, he was among the signatories to the Perak State Constitution.

== Death ==
He died in 1964 and was buried in the compound of the Kota Lama Kanan Mosque in Kuala Kangsar. In 1985, one of his sons, Dato' Seri Megat Jaafar Bin Megat Yunus, inherited the title of Orang Kaya Besar Maharaja of Perak.
