= Megat Terawis =

Megat Terawis was the first Bendahara of Perak and was known by the title Orang Kaya Bendahara Paduka Raja. He was the son of the Daulat Yang Dipertuan Pagar Ruyung, Megat Terawan. He was to inherit the throne of Pagar Ruyung but he opted for the Bendaharaship of Perak instead of going back to Pagar Ruyung to succeed to the throne. His descendants were holders of the Bendaharaship of Perak. One of his descendants, Megat Menjanas (Orang Kaya Bendahara Paduka Seri Maharaja), married Raja Shah Alam Sayong – a daughter of Sultan Muzaffar Shah II of Perak.

== Descendants ==
Megat Terawis' descendants are named Megat (for males whose fathers are Megats), Puteri (for females whose fathers are Megats), and Tun (for both males and females whose mothers are Puteris).

Some notable members of the Megat Terawis family include:

- Dato' Seri Dr Megat Khas Bin Megat Omar
  - Tan Sri Megat Najmuddin Megat Khas
- Megat Mohd Isa
  - Dato' Megat Yunus bin Megat Mohd Isa
    - Dato' Seri Megat Jaafar bin Megat Yunus
- Megat Ayob
  - Tan Sri Megat Junid bin Megat Ayub
    - Datuk Megat Firdouz bin Megat Junid
    - Dr Puteri Julia Nabilah binti Megat Junid
- Dato' Megat Mohd Nordin
  - Megat Ainuddin bin Dato' Megat Mohd Nordin
- Megat Mohd Nor
  - Tan Sri Dato’ Megat Zaharuddin bin Megat Mohd Nor
- Megat Shamsuddin
  - Megat Kamaruddin bin Megat Shamsuddin
    - Puteri Sarah Liyana binti Megat Kamaruddin

- Dato' Seri Dr Megat Khas Bin Megat Omar
- Dato' Megat Yunus Bin Megat Mohd Isa
- Dato' Seri Megat Jaafar Bin Megat Yunus
- Tan Sri Megat Junid Bin Megat Ayub
- Tan Sri Dato’ Megat Zaharuddin Bin Megat Mohd Nor
- Puteri Sarah Liyana Binti Megat Kamaruddin

=== Association ===
The approximate number of Megat Terawis' descendants is thought to be around 20,000. An association, Persatuan Keturunan Megat Terawis Malaysia was established in 2003 to bring the clan together.
