= Idris Murshidul Azzam Shah of Perak =

Sultan of Perak (r. 1887–1916)

Idris I إدريس ١
- Marhum Rahmatullah
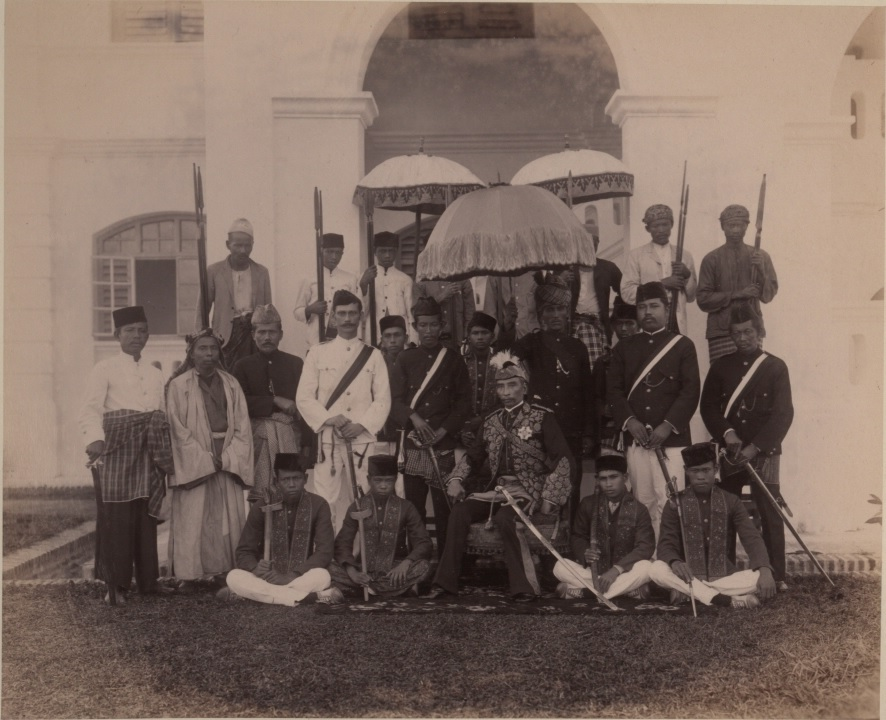
- Sultan Idris Shah and his personal staff, 1897.

Sultan of Perak
- Reign: 29 July 1887 − 14 January 1916
- Installation: 5 April 1889
- Predecessor: Yusuf Sharifuddin Muzaffar Shah of Perak
- Successor: Abdul Jalil Nasiruddin Muhtaram Shah of Perak
- Born: 19 June 1849; Kuala Keboi, Kampar, Perak, British Malaya
- Died: 14 January 1916 (aged 66); Istana Negara, Bukit Chandan, Kuala Kangsar, Perak, British Malaya
- Burial: 17 January 1916; Al-Ghufran Royal Mausoleum, Kuala Kangsar, Perak, British Malaya
- Spouse: Raja Nuteh Aishah Binti Almarhum Sultan Yusuf Sharifuddin Muzaffar Shah Ghafirullah
- Issue: Sultan Abdul Jalil Karamatullah Shah; Raja Abdul Hamid; Sultan Iskandar Shah; Raja Haji Harun al-Rashid; Raja Abdul Rashid; Raja Haji Shuib; Raja Haji Shaharuddin; Raja Muhammad Iskandar; Raja Ngah Khadija Halima; Raja Puteh Mahijah; Raja Kechil Kamariah Kulsum; Raja Badariya; Raja Khalija; Raja Arbia; Raja Fatima ( Tengku Ampuan Paduka Seri Negara of Selangor); Raja Halija; Raja Mahtra
Names
- Sultan Idris Murshidul Azzam Shah Ibni Almarhum Raja Bendahara Alang Iskandar Teja
- House: Siak-Perak
- Father: Raja Alang Iskandar ibni Almarhum Raja Kecil Tengah Raja Ahmad
- Mother: Cik Ken Uda Sari Binti Abdul Rahman
- Religion: Sunni Islam

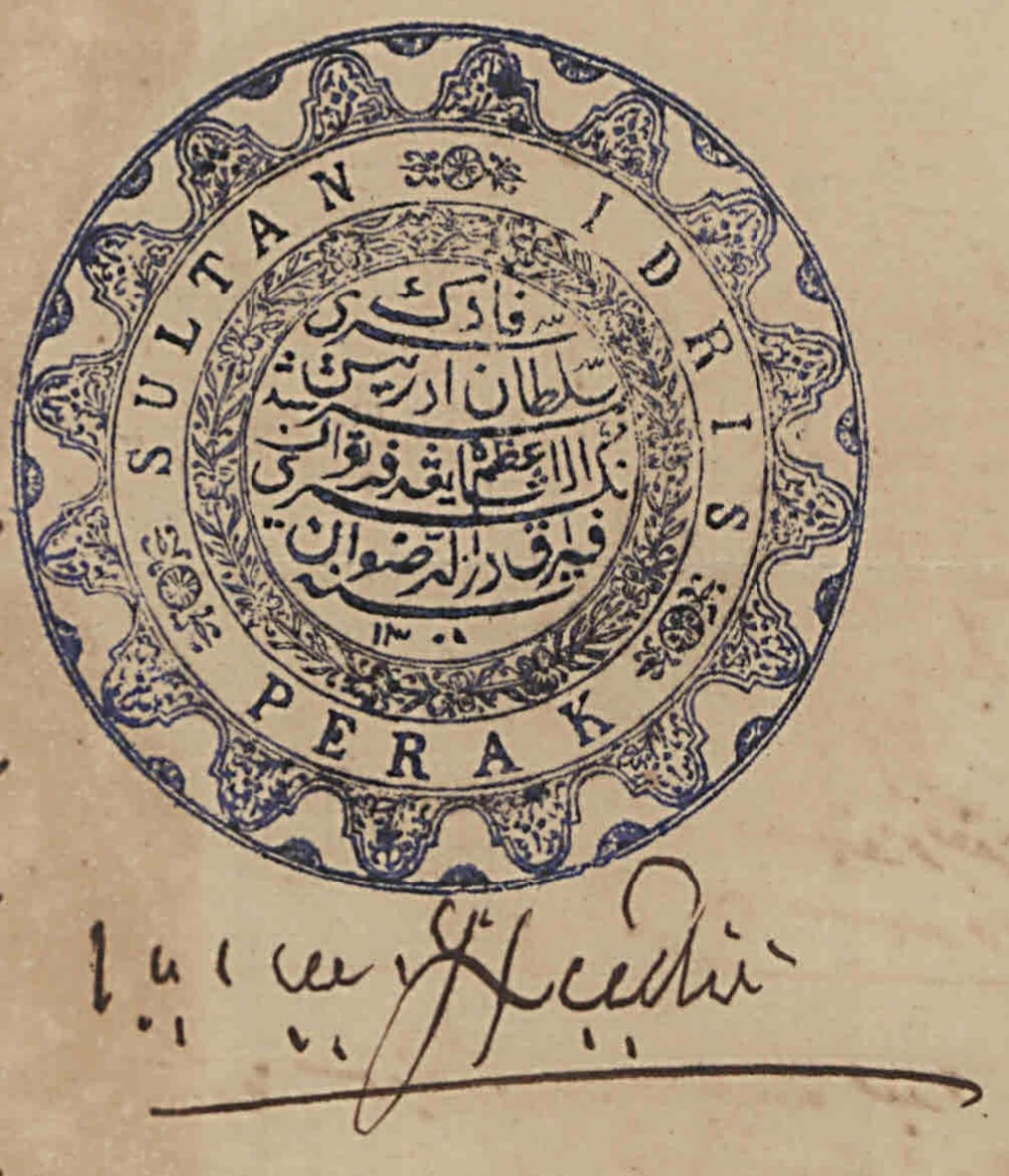
This is the seal and signature of Sultan Idris Murshidul Azzam Shah

Sultan Sir Idris Murshidul Azzam Shah Ibni Almarhum Raja Bendahara Alang Iskandar Marhum Teja GCMG GCVO (Jawi: سلطان سر إدريس مرشد الأعظم شاه ابن المرحوم راج بندهار الڠ إسكندر مرحوم تيجا; 19 June 1849 − 14 January 1916) was the 28th sultan of Perak. Perak at that time was part of the British-administered Federated Malay States.

His rule was marked by Perak joining the Federated Malay States, a federation of four protected states in the Malay Peninsula, including Selangor, Negeri Sembilan and Pahang, established by the British government in 1895, which lasted until 1946.

== Early life ==
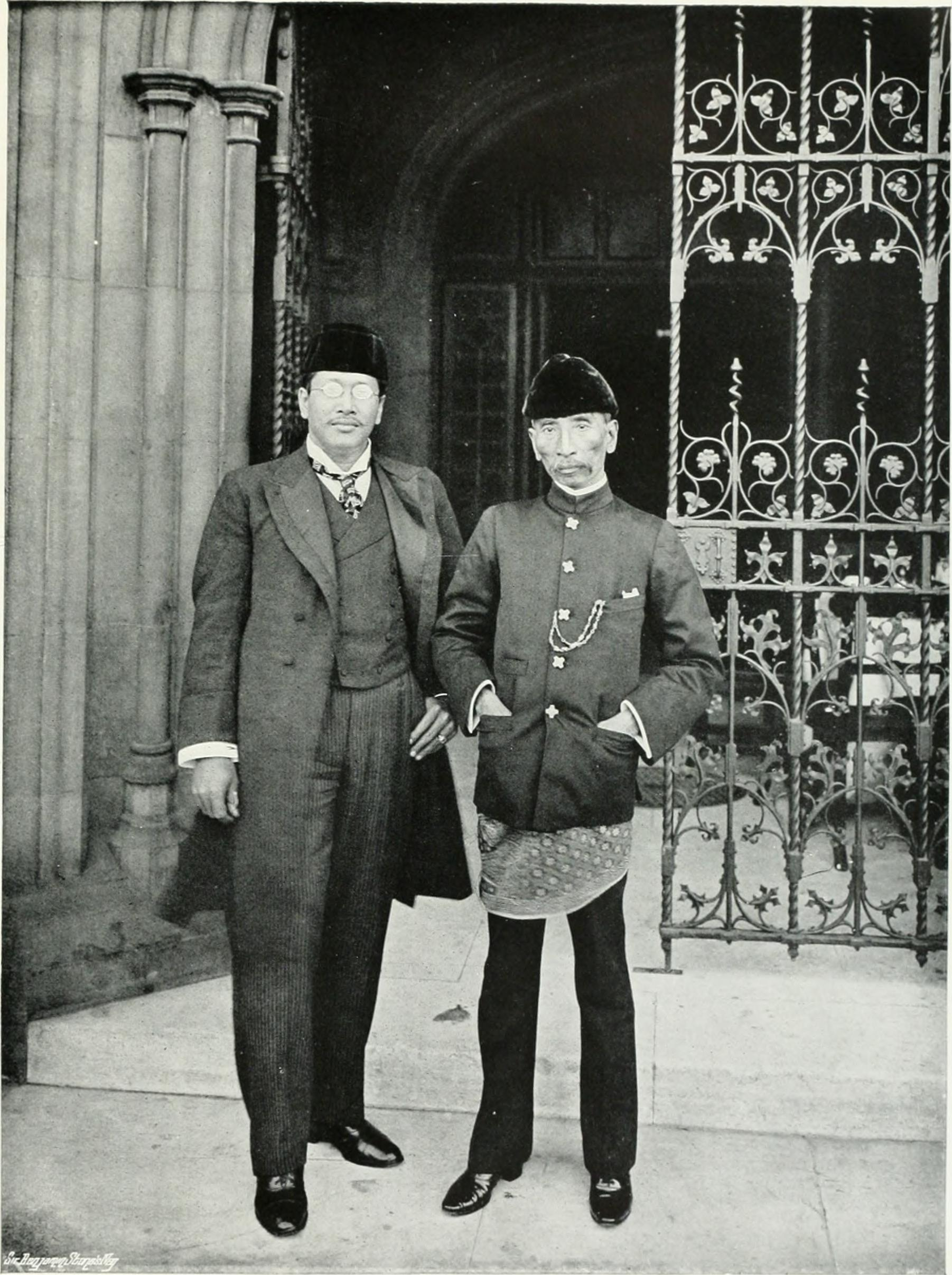
Sultan Idris Shah I (right), accompanied by Raja Chulan (left) at the Houses of Parliament, London, 1906.

Raja Idris Shah was born on 19 June 1849 at Kuala Keboi, Kampar, Perak. He was the son of Alang Iskandar.

In 1875 after the Pangkor Treaty but before the Perak War, he led a deputation to Singapore to bring forward issues of the governance of the new Resident, JWW Birch.

He was the 27th sultan of Perak. He succeeded his father-in-law, Sultan Yusuf Sharifuddin Muzaffar Shah, who died on 26 July 1887, and ruled until his death on 14 January 1916.

In March 1900, he opened the Victoria Bridge, a single track railway bridge located in Karai, Perak. It is one of the oldest railway bridges in Malaysia, having been constructed on the Perak River between December 1897 and March 1900 by the Perak State Railway to serve the local tin mining industry.

He was appointed Honorary Knight Commander of the Order of St Michael and St George (KCMG) in 1892, and received the Honorary Knight Grand Cross of the Order of St Michael and St George (GCMG) on 27 April 1901, in preparation for the upcoming royal visit of the Duke and Duchess of Cornwall and York (later King George V and Queen Mary).

In 1902 he visited the United Kingdom to attend the Coronation of King Edward VII and Queen Alexandra, arriving at London in early June, and prolonging his stay until the autumn to be present for the rescheduled ceremony following the King's illness.

== Death ==
Upon returning to Perak in 1911, Sultan Idris health was under par and he rested at Port Dickson. Whilst recovering, he vowed that should he return to good health, he would build a mosque in Bukit Chandan. His vow later materialised with the erection of Ubudiah Mosque but he did not live to see it completed. Sultan Idris died on 14 January 1916 at the age of 66. He was interred at the Royal Mausoleum, Kuala Kangsar with the title of Marhum Rahmatullah. He was succeeded by his son Abdul Jalil Nasiruddin Muhtaram Shah.

Preceded by Sultan Yusuf Sharifuddin Mudzaffar Shah Ibni Almarhum Sultan Abdullah Muhammad Shah I I'tikadullah	Sultan of Perak; 1887−1916	Succeeded by Sultan Abdul Jalil Karamatullah Nasiruddin Mukhataram Shah Ibni Almarhum Sultan Idris Murshidul Azzam Shah Rahmatullah
