= Iskandar of Perak =

Sultan of Perak (r. 1918–1938)

Sultan Iskandar Shah سلطان إسكندر شاه
- Marhum Kaddasullah
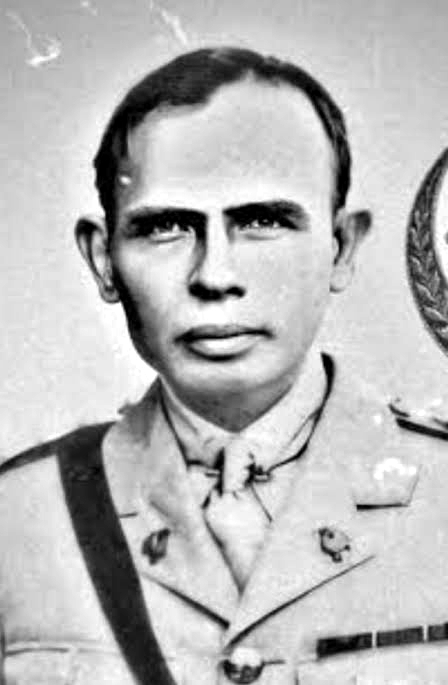
- Iskandar in the uniform of the Federated Malay States Police, where he served from 1905 to 1918, and was made Honorary Commissioner until his death.

Sultan of Perak
- Reign: December 1918 – 14 October 1938
- Coronation: 10 April 1919
- Predecessor: Abdul Jalil Nasiruddin Muhtaram Shah of Perak
- Successor: Abdul Aziz al-Mu’tasim Billah Shah of Perak
- Regent: 1914–1918
- Born: Tengku Iskandar; 10 May 1876; Kuala Keboi, Kampar, Perak, British Malaya
- Died: 14 October 1938 (aged 62); Istana Iskandariah, Bukit Chandan, Kuala Kangsar, Perak, British Malaya
- Burial: 17 October 1938; Al-Ghufran Royal Mausoleum, Kuala Kangsar, Perak, British Malaya
- Spouse: Raja Puteh Umi Kalsum Binti Raja Kulop Muhammad Kramat
- Issue: Raja Idris Shah (Raja Di-Hilir of Perak); Raja Muhammad Iskandar; Raja Dato Sri Ahmad Saiffuddin Shah (Raja Muda of Perak) (1984–1987); Raja Ismail Iskandar; Raja Shaharuddin; Raja Fatima (Tengku Ampuan of Pahang); Raja Rafia; Raja Hajjah Aisha; Raja Aslah; Raja Intan Suraya; Raja Ani; Raja Halima; Raja Khadija; Raja Rahmah; Raja Puteh Mariam
Names
- Sultan Iskandar Shah Ibni Almarhum Sultan Idris Murshidul Azzam Shah Rahmatullah
- House: Siak-Perak
- Father: Sultan Idris Murshidul Azzam Shah Ibni Almarhum Raja Bendahara Alang Iskandar Teja
- Mother: Cik Ngah Manah Binti Manda Duwayat
- Religion: Sunni Islam

Sultan Iskandar Shah Ibni Almarhum Sultan Idris Murshidul Azzam Shah Rahmatullah GCMG KCVO (Jawi: سلطان إسكندر شاه ابن المرحوم سلطان إدريس مرشد الأعظم شاه رحمة الله; 10 May 1876 – 14 October 1938) was the 30th sultan of Perak. Perak at that time was part of the British-administered Federated Malay States. He stayed at the Istana Kenangan, then moved to the Istana Iskandariah in Bukit Chandan, Kuala Kangsar.

== Early life ==
Born at Kuala Keboi, Kampar, 10 May 1876, he was the third son of Sultan Idris Murshidul Azzam Shah and his wife Cik Ngah Manah binti Manda Duwayat, herself a member of the Royal House of Perak.

== Assistant Commissioner of Federated Malay States Police ==
In 1905, Iskandar was made Assistant Commissioner of the Federated Malay States Police, assigned to the Bluff Road Police Compound and the Police Training Depot as chief recruiter for the FMS Police. He travelled across the country, enlisting men into the service, and giving lectures to villages and their headmen on the nature of the new service.

The FMS Police uniform, originally a blue, long-sleeved and long-legged uniform designed by Harry Syers, was redesigned by Iskandar. Iskandar changed the uniform from blue to khaki, and introduced shorts, puttees, combat boots, and localized headgear.

== Sultan of Perak ==
He was made Raja Bendahara (Deputy Crown Prince) in 1918 during the reign of his elder half-brother, Sultan Abdul Jalil Nasiruddin Muhtaram Shah. He ascended the throne in November 1918 following the death of his brother.

Sultan Iskandar was a major advocate of decentralizing the Federated Malay States and even visited the Colonial Office in August 1924 to espouse his views.

For a short time, he resided at the Istana Lembah (the construction of which was started by Tukang Sofian after the great flood of 1926 and completed in 1931) until the Istana Iskandariah was completed in 1933.

In 1935 the British returned Dinding and Pulau Pangkor to Perak. Prior to that, both territories were administered as part of the Straits Settlements.

Sultan Iskandar died at the Istana Iskandariah on 14 October 1938 after a short illness. He was interred at the Al-Ghufran Royal Mausoleum at Bukit Chandan with the posthumous title Marhum Kaddasullah on 17 October 1938. He was succeeded by his brother-in-law and paternal second cousin, Abdul Aziz al-Muʽtasim Billah Shah.

Preceded by Sultan Abdul Jalil Karamatullah Nasiruddin Mukhataram Shah Ibni Almarhum Sultan Idris Murshidul Azzam Shah I Rahmatullah	Sultan of Perak; 1918-1938	Succeeded by Sultan Abdul Aziz Al-Mutasim Billah Shah Ibni Almarhum Raja Muda Musa
