= Yusuf Sharifuddin Muzaffar Shah of Perak =

Sultan of Perak (1874–1877)

Yusuf يوسف
- Marhum Ghafirullah
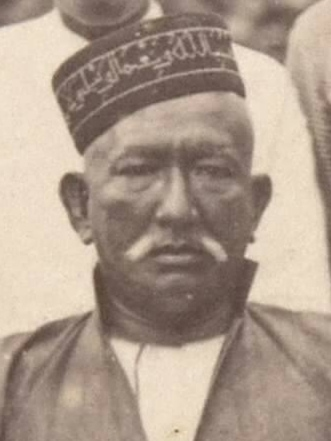
- Sultan of Perak XXVII

Sultan of Perak
- Reign: 11 May 1886 – 26 July 1887
- Installation: 7 October 1886
- Predecessor: Abdullah Muhammad Shah II of Perak
- Successor: Idris Shah I of Perak

Regent of Perak
- Reign: 30 March 1877 – 11 May 1886 (Raja Muda 1874-1886)*
- Predecessor: Raja Abdullah (Raja Muda)
- Successor: Raja Idris Shah (Raja Muda)
- Born: 1830; Sultanate of Perak
- Died: 28 July 1887 (aged 57); Sayong, Kuala Kangsar, Perak, British Malaya
- Burial: Masjid Sayong Tengah, Kuala Kangsar, Perak, British Malaya
- Spouse: Toh Puan Besar Raja Fatimah binti Toh Besar Indira Bongsu
- Issue: Raja Mansur; Raja Muhammad Azzam; Raja Pendawa; Raja Johor (Raja Kechil Tengah of Perak); Raja Nuteh Aishah (Raja Perempuan of Perak)
Names
- Sultan Yusuf Sharifuddin Muzaffar Shah ibni al-Marhum Sultan Abdullah Muhammad Shah I Itikadullah
- House: Siak-Perak
- Father: Sultan Abdullah Muhammad Shah I ibni Almarhum Raja Kechil Besar Abdul Rahman
- Mother: Raja Ngah Aminah binti Almarhum Raja Alang Radin
- Religion: Islam

Sultan Yusuf Sharifuddin Muzaffar Shah (Jawi: سلطان يوسف شريف الدين مظفر شاه; 1830 – 28 July 1887) was appointed as the 27th Sultan of Perak reigning from 1886 to 1887.

== Regency and becoming Sultan ==
During the reign of Sultan Jaafar Mua'azzam Shah (died in 1865), and during the reign of Sultan Ali Al-Mukammal Inayat Shah, he was not elected to be the raja bendahara although he was eligible and entitled. This was because he was disliked by several rulers and officials of Perak, with them fearing that he would be overbearing should he be appointed to the role. When Raja Muda (crown prince) Raja Abdullah was elected to be the 26th Sultan of Perak, he was appointed as the raja muda to strengthen his position; at that time he was residing in Senggang.

In 1877, Raja Yusuf was made Regent of Perak and he moved to Sayong after Sultan Abdullah Muhammad Shah II went to Singapore after being called by the British Government in connection with the investigation into the murder of James W. W. Birch.

Following this, a state council whose members consisted of Raja Yusuf as President, Hugh Low (British Resident), Raja Idris, Kapitan Chung Keng Kwee (Chairman of Chinese Ho Kuan or Hai San) and Kapitan Chin Ah Yam (Chairman of the Chinese Group Si Kuan or Ghi Hin) was formed. The first conference of the Council was held in Kuala Kangsar on 10 September 1877 to negotiate Perak's government policies.

During his time as regent, many tin mines were opened in the Kinta area. The Chinese arrived to the Kinta area to work in the tin mining industry. Likewise, the Malays from Sumatra, Java and Kalimantan came to Perak to seek work in the mines. In June 1885, the first railroad in Malaya from Taiping to Port Weld (now known as Kuala Sepetang) was built and operated.

On 7 October 1886, he was proclaimed Sultan of Perak and resided in Sayong Tebing. At the same time, Raja Bendahara Raja Idris was appointed as raja muda and later became his successor as sultan.

== Death ==
Sultan Yusuf Sharifuddin Muzaffar Shah ruled Perak for only ten months, and died on 26 July 1887 in Sayong. He was posthumously conferred Marhum Ghafirullah. The original tomb was located at Sayong Tebing but was transferred to the Sayong Tengah Mosque area.

Yusuf Sharifuddin Muzaffar Shah of Perak Died: July 26 1887
Regnal titles
Preceded by Sultan Abdullah Muhammad Shah II	Sultan of Perak; 1886-1887	Succeeded by Sultan Idris Murshidul Adzam Shah I
