= Ahmad Tajuddin Shah of Perak =

Ahmad Tajuddin Shah احمد تاج الدين شاه

Sultan of Perak
- Reign: 1577–1584
- Predecessor: Mansur Shah I
- Successor: Tajul Ariffin
- Born: Raja Ahmad
- Died: 1584; Jalong
- Burial: Geronggong, Pulau Tiga, Lower Perak District, Perak Sultanate
- Issue: Raja Kecil Lasa Raja Inu
Names
- Raja Ahmad ibni Almarhum Sultan Mansur Shah I (راج احمد ابن المرحوم سلطان منصور شاه ڤرتام)
Regnal name
- Paduka Sri Sultan Ahmad Tajuddin Shah ibni Almarhum Sultan Mansur Shah I (ڤادوكا سري سلطان احمد تاج الدين شاه ابن المرحوم سلطان منصور شاه ڤرتام)
Posthumous name
- Marhum Muda (مرحوم مودا)
- House: Perak
- Father: Mansur Shah I
- Religion: Sunni Islam

Paduka Sri Sultan Ahmad Tajuddin Shah ibni Almarhum Sultan Mansur Shah I (Jawi: ڤادوكا سري سلطان احمد تاج الدين شاه ابن المرحوم سلطان منصور شاه ڤرتام; died 1584) was the third sultan of Perak. He was the son of the second sultan of Perak, Mansur Shah I.

== Reign ==
When Mansur Shah I died, Perak was under the control of the Aceh Sultanate. On news of his death, the people of Perak went to Aceh to see the sultan, Alauddin Mansur Syah, who was the eldest son of Mansur Shah I. They asked for a prince to be made sultan in Perak. Alauddin Mansur Syah agreed and sent his younger brother Raja Ahmad.

After gaining the throne of the Perak Sultanate, Raja Ahmad took the title Sultan Ahmad Tajuddin Shah and took residence in a place called Jalong. However, because the area was often flooded, he moved to a new location called Geronggong, which is located in Pulau Tiga subdistrict.

== Death ==
Ahmad Tajuddin Shah ruled Perak for seven years and died in 1584 in Jalong and was given the title Marhum Muda. Sultan Ahmad Tajuddin Shah's son Raja Inu was titled Raja Kecil Lasa.

His mother and his relatives who were taken to Aceh left to return to Perak. Since then, the power of the Aceh Sultanate over Perak had begun to wane.

The tomb of Ahmad Tajuddin Shah is located in Kampung Jawa which is close to Kampung Gajah. Near the mausoleum of Ahmad Tajuddin Shah there is also the mausoleum of the 11th sultan of Perak and the mausoleum of the 12th sultan of Perak.

Ahmad Tajuddin Shah of Perak House of Melaka-Perak Died: 1584
Regnal titles
Preceded by Mansur Shah I	Sultan of Perak; 1577–1584	Succeeded by Tajul Ariffin
