= Orders, decorations, and medals of Kedah =

The following is the orders, decorations, and medals given by the Sultan of Kedah. When applicable, post-nominal letters and non-hereditary titles are indicated.

== Order of precedence for the wearing of order insignias, decorations, and medals ==
Precedence:

1.	Bintang Keberanian Kedah	B.K.K.
2.	Darjah Kerabat	D.K.		Left shoulder
3.	Darjah Kerabat Halimi	D.K.H.
4.	Darjah Utama Kedah	D.U.K. (K.O.M.)
5.	Darjah Utama Seri Mahawangsa Yang Amat Dihormati	D.M.K.	Dato' Seri Utama
6.	Darjah Utama Seri Maharaja Bintang Darul Aman Kedah	S.M.D.K.	Dato' Seri Utama
7.	Bintang Perkasa Kedah	B.P.K.
8.	Darjah Seri Setia Sultan Abdul Halim Mu'adzam Shah Yang Amat Dihormati	S.H.M.S.	Dato’ Seri Diraja
9.	Darjah Seri Wira Gemilang Seri Mahkota Kedah Yang Amat Dihormati	S.G.M.K.	Dato’ Seri Wira
10.	Darjah Seri Paduka Mahkota Kedah Yang Amat Dihormati	S.P.M.K.	Dato’ Seri	Max. 20 pers.
11.	Darjah Seri Setia Diraja Kedah Yang Amat Dihormati	S.S.D.K.	Dato’ Seri	Max. 25 pers.
12.	Dato' Paduka Seri Setia Sultan Abdul Halim Mu'adzam Shah	D.H.M.S.	Dato’ Paduka
13.	Darjah Maharaja Bintang Darul Aman Kedah	D.M.D.K.	Dato’ Diraja
14.	Darjah Kebesaran Gemilang Seri Mahkota Kedah Yang Amat Dihormati	D.G.M.K.	Dato’ Wira
15.	Darjah Paduka Mahkota Kedah	D.P.M.K.	Dato’	Max. 100 pers.
16.	Darjah Dato' Setia DiRaja Kedah	D.S.D.K.	Dato’	Max. 150 pers.
17.	Pingat Perkasa Kedah	P.P.K.
18.	Pingat Sultan Badlishah	P.S.B.
19.	Setia Sultan Abdul Halim Muadzam Shah	S.M.S.
20.	Setia Maharaja Bintang Darul Aman Kedah	S.M.D.
21.	Setia Gemilang Seri Mahkota Kedah	S.G.K.
22.	Setia Mahkota Kedah	S.M.K.
23.	Setia DiRaja Kedah	S.D.K.
24.	Bintang Setia Sultan Abdul Halim Muadzam Shah	B.M.S.
25.	Ahli Gemilang Mahkota Kedah	A.G.K.
26.	Ahli Mahkota Kedah	A.M.K.
27.	Bintang Maharaja Darul Aman Kedah	B.D.K.
28.	Bintang Perkhidmatan Cemerlang Kedah	B.C.K.
29.	Jaksa Pendamai	J.P.
30.	Bintang Kebaktian Masyarakat	B.K.M.
31.	Pingat Perkhidmatan Yang Berbakti Negeri Kedah	P.C.K.
32.	Ahli Cemerlang Semangat Jerai Kedah	A.S.K.
33.	Bintang Semangat Jerai	B.S.J.
34.	Pingat Jasa Kebaktian	P.J.K.
35.	Bintang Semangat Jerai Kedah	B.S.K.
36.	Bintang Perkhidmatan Lama	B.P.L.
37.	Pingat Perkhidmatan Lama	P.P.L.

== Orders, decorations, and medals ==
State of Kedah Star of Valour - Bintang Keberanian Negeri Kedah

- Founded by Sultan Badlishah on 30 October 1952 as a reward for acts of supreme valour performed by the military or civilians in circumstances of extreme danger during peacetime or war. This Medal is the highest and the most senior in rank. This honour is conferred on members of the Armed Forces and the Police, who have shown exceptional bravery and have performed deeds of valour demonstrating the highest degree of self-sacrifice. There should be at least two witnesses to a candidate's deed. This award may be conferred posthumously. - Photo 1 - Photo 2
- Awarded in one class only, bronze star - B.K.K.

The Most Illustrious Royal Family Order of Kedah - Darjah Kerabat Yang Amat Mulia Kedah

- Founded by Sultan Abdul Halim Mu'adzam Shah on 21 February 1964.
- The Darjah Kerabat is reserved for members of the Royal Family only. It is conferred only at the express wish of His Royal Highness the Sultan. - Photos : Men & Women & RA
- Awarded in one class, Darjah Kerabat or member - D.K.
- The sash of the order is worn from the left shoulder to the right hip

The Most Illustrious Halimi Family Order of Kedah - Darjah Kerabat Halimi Yang Amat Mulia Kedah

- Founded by Sultan Abdul Halim Mu'adzam Shah in January 1973.
- The Darjah Kerabat Halimi is also reserved for members of the Royal Family only. It is also conferred at the express wish of His Royal Highness the Sultan. - Photos : Men & Women
- Awarded in one class, Darjah Kerabat Halimi or member - D.K.H.
- The sash of the order is worn from the left shoulder to the right hip

The Kedah Supreme Order of Merit (K.O.M.) - Darjah Utama Untuk Jasa Kedah

- Founded by Sultan Badlishah on 17 November 1953 (or 30 October 1952).
- This is the highest Order to be conferred on those who have performed meritorious deeds with full responsibility to the nation for a stated number of years. It is conferred on those of high position and wide influence. This Order may be held by only three living persons at one time, and it is seldom conferred. - Photos : Kedah & RA
- Awarded in one class only - limited to three living recipients - D.U.K.

The Most Esteemed Supreme Order of Sri Mahawangsa - Darjah Utama Sri Mahawangsa Yang Amat Dihormati

- Founded by Sultan Abdul Halim Mu'adzam Shah in 2005.
- Awarded in one class only - member - D.M.K.

State of Kedah Star of Gallantry - Bintang Perkasa Negeri Kedah

- Instituted by Sultan Badlishah on 30 October 1952 as a reward for conspicuous acts of gallantry by the military, police or civilians, but of a standard less than the Star of Valour.
- This Medal is awarded to ranking members of the Armed Forces and the Police who have shown and performed acts of gallantry and bravery which could not be recognised to have merited the B.K.K. This Medal may be awarded posthumously. - Photos : Kedah & RA
- Awarded in one class only, silver star - B.P.K.

The Exalted Order of the Crown of Kedah - Darjah Yang Maha Mulia Sri Mahkota Kedah

- Founded by Sultan Abdul Halim Mu'adzam Shah on 21 February 1964.
- Awarded in four classes :
  - 1. Knight Grand Commander or Dato’ Sri Paduka - S.P.M.K.
    - This Order is conferred on those of high position and standing who are well known for their excellence in the performance of their duties, in whatever field of service, to the State and the Nation. The recipient is dubbed with the title, "Dato' Seri". This is considered the highest Order, and it may be held by only 20 persons at one time. - Photo
  - 2. Knight Commander or Dato’ Paduka - D.P.M.K.
    - This Order ranks second to the Darjah Yang Mulia Seri Mahkota, and is conferred on those who have, for a number of years, performed meritorious deeds with great responsibility to the State and Nation. It is awarded to those of high position and great influence. Conferment of this Order is limited to 100 persons only. For government officers, this Order is only given to those in the Management and Professional level or those of similar status. - Photos : Men & Women
  - 3. Companion or Setia - Photos : Men & Women - S.M.K.
  - 4. Member or Ahli - Photos : Kedah & RA - A.M.K.

The Illustrious Order of Loyalty to the Royal House of Kedah - Darjah Yang Mulia Setia Diraja

- Founded by Sultan Abdul Halim Mu'adzam Shah on 21 September 1973.
- Awarded in three classes :
  - 1. Knight Grand Companion or Dato’ Sri Setia - S.S.D.K.
    - This Order is conferred on those of high position who are well known for their excellence in the performance of their duties to the State and Nation, in whatever field. This Order may be held by only 25 persons at one time, and recipients are honoured with the title, "Dato’ Seri". - Photos : Men & Women
  - 2. Knight Companion or Dato’ Setia - D.S.D.K.
    - This Order ranks second to the Darjah Yang Mulia Seri Setia. It is conferred on those in high positions, exercising great influence, who have performed, with great responsibility, much excellent service to the State and Nation. The conferment of this Order is limited to 150 persons only. For government servants, this Order is only given to those in the Management and Professional level or those of similar status. - Photos : Men (Kedah) & Women (RA)
  - 3. Companion or Setia - Photos : Men & Women - S.D.K.

The Illustrious Order of Loyalty to Sultan Abdul Halim Mu'adzam Shah - Darjah Yang Mulia Sri Setia Sultan Abdul Halim Mu'adzam Shah

- Founded by Sultan Abdul Halim Mu'adzam Shah on 15 July 1983.
- Awarded in four classes :
  - 1. Grand Commander or Sri - S.H.M.S. (founded by Sultan Abdul Halim Mu'adzam Shah in 2008)
  - 2. Knight Commander or Datuk Sri Paduka - D.H.M.S.
    - The Order is conferred on those in high positions who have performed meritorious services to the State and Nation. Its recipients are dubbed with the title, "Dato’ Paduka" - Photo
  - 3. Companion or Setia - Photos : Men & Women - S.M.S.
  - 4. Star or Bintang - Photo - B.M.S.

The Glorious Order of the Crown of Kedah - Darjah Kebesaran Gemilang Sri Mahkota Kedah

- Founded by Sultan Abdul Halim Mu'adzam Shah in January 2001.
- Awarded in three classes :
  - 1. Knight Commander or Dato’ Wira - D.G.M.K.
  - 2. Companion or Setia - G.M.K.
  - 3. Member or Ahli - A.G.K.

State of Kedah Gallantry Medal - Pingat Untuk Perkasa Negeri Kedah

- Instituted by Sultan Badlishah on 30 October 1952 to reward acts of gallantry by non-commissioned officers and men of the security forces and police.
- This medal is awarded to non-commissioned officers of the Armed Forces and the Police who have shown or performed some deed which could be considered brave and gallant and has been deemed eligible to be so recognised, but which is not of a standard to be conferred the B.K.K. This award may be given posthumously. - Photos : Kedah & RA
- Awarded in a single class, silver medal - P.P.K.

Sultan Badlishah Medal for Faithful and Loyal Service - Pingat Sultan Badlishah Kerana Taat Setia

- Instituted by Sultan Badlishah on 30 October 1952 to reward acts of loyalty, faithful service or gallantry directly connected to the person of the sultan.
- This medal is awarded to those who have served in positions closest to His Highness the Sultan with great faith and loyalty. His Highness the Sultan may award this medal to anyone he chooses without the need for any formal candidacy. - Photos : Kedah & RA
- Awarded in a single class, silver medal - P.S.B.

State of Kedah Distinguished Service Star - Bintang Perkhidmatan Yang Berbakti Negeri Kedah

- Instituted by Sultan Badlishah on 30 October 1952 to reward distinguished services to the state of Kedah.
- This Decoration is awarded as a reward for persons who have shown excellence in the performance of their service, who have performed good deeds and shown much dedication in the performance of their duties, and who have also surpassed expectations in the performance of their duties. This award is given to officers or those of similar rank. - Photos : Kedah & RA
- Awarded in a single class, an eight pointed silver star - B.C.K.

Although engraved "Kedah, For Distinguished Service" this decoration is also called Bintang Perkhidmatan Cemerlang or the Excellent Service Star.

Justice of the Peace of Kedah - Jaksa Pendamai Kedah

- Instituted by Sultan Badlishah in 1953
- Awarded in a single class, J.P.

State of Kedah Distinguished Service Medal - Pingat Perkhidmatan Yang Berbakti Negeri Kedah

- Instituted by Sultan Badlishah on 30 October 1952 to reward distinguished services to the state of Kedah.
- This Medal is awarded as a reward for persons who have shown excellence in the performance of their service, who have performed good deeds and shown much dedication in the performance of their duties, and have also surpassed expectations in the performance of their duties. This award is given to members of the non-executive and below and to those of equivalent status. - Photos : Kedah & RA
- Awarded in a single class, a silver medal - P.C.K.

Although engraved "Kedah, For Distinguished Service" this decoration is also called Pingat Perkhidmatan Cemerlang or the Excellent Service Medal.

Public Service Star - Bintang Kebaktian Masyarakat

- Instituted by Sultan Abdul Halim Mu'adzam Shah on 21 January 1973 as a reward for community service by those not in government employ.
- This Decoration is awarded to those who have performed great deeds and much excellent service voluntarily. It is awarded to those not in the government service. However, government servants may be considered for this award if deemed qualified. - Photo
- Awarded in a single class, silver star - B.K.M.

Meritorious Service Medal - Pingat Perkhidmatan Yang Jasa Kebaktian

- Instituted by Sultan Badlishah on 30 October 1952 to reward services in the furtherance of the prosperity of the state or for substantial acts of public charity.
- This Medal is awarded to those who have performed good services and have shown faith and loyalty in the performance of their duties to the State and Nation in whatever field. - Photos : Kedah & RA
- Awarded in a single class, silver medal - P.J.K.

Jerai Star for Vigour - Bintang Semangat Jerai

- Instituted by Sultan Abdul Hamid Halim Shah to reward those who have overcome adversity or disability with spirit, enthusiasm, vigour and a zest for life.
- Awarded in a single class - B.S.J.

Jerai Medal for Excellent Vigour - Pingat Cemerlang Semangat Jerai

- Instituted by Sultan Abdul Hamid Halim Shah to reward achievement in a variety of areas of public endeavour, including sport, the arts and entertainment.
- Awarded in a single class, Ahli or Member - A.S.J.

Long Service and Good Conduct Star - Bintang Untuk Perkhidmatan Lama dan Kelakuan Baik

- Instituted by Sultan Badlishah on 30 October 1952 to reward twenty-one years of continuous long service and good conduct in state service, at the level of officer or executive, or above.
- This Decoration is awarded to a Government Official with an "officer" status, who has served for 21 years continuously, provided that he has a clean record of service.
- Awarded in a single class, six pointed silver star - Photos : Kedah & RA - B.P.L.

Kedah Police Medal - Pingat Perkhidmatan Lama Polis

- Instituted by Sultan Abdul Hamid Halim Shah on 23 May 1931 as a reward for long and distinguished services in the Kedah state police.
- Awarded in a single class, silver medal (P.L.P.). Made obsolete in 1952.

Faithful Service Medal - Pingat Untuk Pekerjaan Taat Setia

- Instituted by Sultan Abdul Hamid Halim Shah on 23 May 1931 as a reward for long and faithful services to the Sultan and State of Kedah . Photo : RA
- Awarded in a single class, silver medal. Made obsolete in 1952, when living recipients were required to exchange their medals for the new Long Service and Good Conduct Star or Medal.

Long Service and Good Conduct Medal - Pingat Untuk Perkhidmatan Lama dan Kelakuan Baik

- Instituted by Sultan Badlishah on 30 October 1952 to reward twenty-one years of continuous long service and good conduct in state service, at the non-executive level or below
- This medal is awarded to Government Servants in the non-executive level and below who have served the government for 21 years continuously, provided that they have a clean record of service.
- Awarded in a single class, silver medal - Photos : Kedah & RA - P.P.L.

Installation Medal 1943 - Pingat Pertabalan Negeri Kedah 1943

- Instituted by Sultan Badlishah to commemorate his installation as Sultan in 1943.
- Awarded in two classes, silver-gilt and silver medals. Gilt photo : RA

Installation Medal 1959 - Pingat Pertabalan Negeri Kedah 1959

- Instituted by Sultan Abdul Halim Mu'adzam Shah on 26 February 1959 to commemorate his installation as Sultan.
- Awarded in two classes, silver-gilt and silver medals. Gilt photo : RA

Silver Jubilee Remembrance Medal - Pingat Peringatan Jubli Perak

- Instituted by Sultan Abdul Halim Mu'adzam Shah on 15 October 1983 to commemorate the twenty-fifth anniversary of his installation as Sultan.
- Awarded in a single class, a silver medal - Photo : RA - PPJP

Gold Jubilee Remembrance Medal - Pingat Peringatan Jubli Mas

- Instituted by Sultan Abdul Halim Mu'adzam Shah on 15 October 2005 to commemorate the fiftieth anniversary of his installation as Sultan.
- Awarded in a single class, a silver medal - Photo : RA - PPJP

== Timelines ==
Reign		Sultan Badlishah (1943-1958)		Sultan Abdul Halim Mu'adzam Shah (From 13 July 1958 - 2017)						
Order	Post-nom.	30 Oct. 1952	17 Nov. 1953	21 Feb. 1964	21 Jan. 1973	21 Sep. 1973	15 Jul. 1983	Jan. 2001	2005	2008
State of Kedah Star of Valour	BKK	X	X	X	X	X	X	X	X	X
Family Order of Kedah	DK	.	.	X	X	X	X	X	X	X
Halimi Family Order of Kedah	DKH	.	.	.	X	X	X	X	X	X
Kedah Supreme Order of Merit	KOM	?	X	X	X	X	X	X	X	X
Supreme Order of Sri Mahawangsa	DMK	.	.	.	.	.	.	.	X	X
State of Kedah Star of Gallantry	BPK	X	X	X	X	X	X	X	X	X
Order of the Crown of Kedah	SPMK	.	.	X	X	X	X	X	X	X
Royal Order of Loyalty	SSDK	.	.	.	.	X	X	X	X	X
Order of Sultan Abdul Halim	SHMS	.	.	.	.	.	.	.	.	X
Glorious Order of the Crown of Kedah	DGMK	.	.	.	.	.	.	X	X	X
Order of the Crown of Kedah	D.P.M.K.	.	.	X	X	X	X	X	X	X
Royal Order of Loyalty	D.S.D.K.	.	.	.	.	X	X	X	X	X
Order of Loyalty to Sultan Abdul Halim	D.H.M.S.	.	.	.	.	.	X	X	X	X
State of Kedah Gallantry Medal	P.P.K.	X	X	X	X	X	X	X	X	X
Sultan Badlishah Medal	P.S.B.	X	X	X	X	X	X	X	X	X
Order of Loyalty to Sultan Abdul Halim	S.M.S.	.	.	.	.	.	X	X	X	X
Glorious Order of the Crown of Kedah	G.M.K.	.	.	.	.	.	.	X	X	X
Order of the Crown of Kedah	S.M.K.	.	.	X	X	X	X	X	X	X
Royal Order of Loyalty	S.D.K.	.	.	.	.	X	X	X	X	X
Order of Loyalty to Sultan Abdul Halim	B.M.S.	.	.	.	.	.	X	X	X	X
Glorious Order of the Crown of Kedah	A.G.K.	.	.	.	.	.	.	X	X	X
Order of the Crown of Kedah	A.M.K.	.	.	X	X	X	X	X	X	X
Kedah Distinguished Service Star	B.C.K.	X	X	X	X	X	X	X	X	X
Justice of Peace	J.P.	.	X	X	X	X	X	X	X	X
Kedah Distinguished Service Medal	P.C.K.	X	X	X	X	X	X	X	X	X
Public Service Star	B.K.M.	.	.	.	X	X	X	X	X	X
Meritorious Service Medal	P.J.K.	X	X	X	X	X	X	X	X	X
Long Service and Good Conduct Star	B.P.L.	X	X	X	X	X	X	X	X	X
Long Service and Good Conduct Medal	P.P.L.	X	X	X	X	X	X	X	X	X

Decorations in bold letters are orders; Decorations in usual style are stars and medals

== See also ==
- Orders, decorations, and medals of the Malaysian states and federal territories#Kedah
- List of post-nominal letters (Kedah)
