= Monarchies of Malaysia =

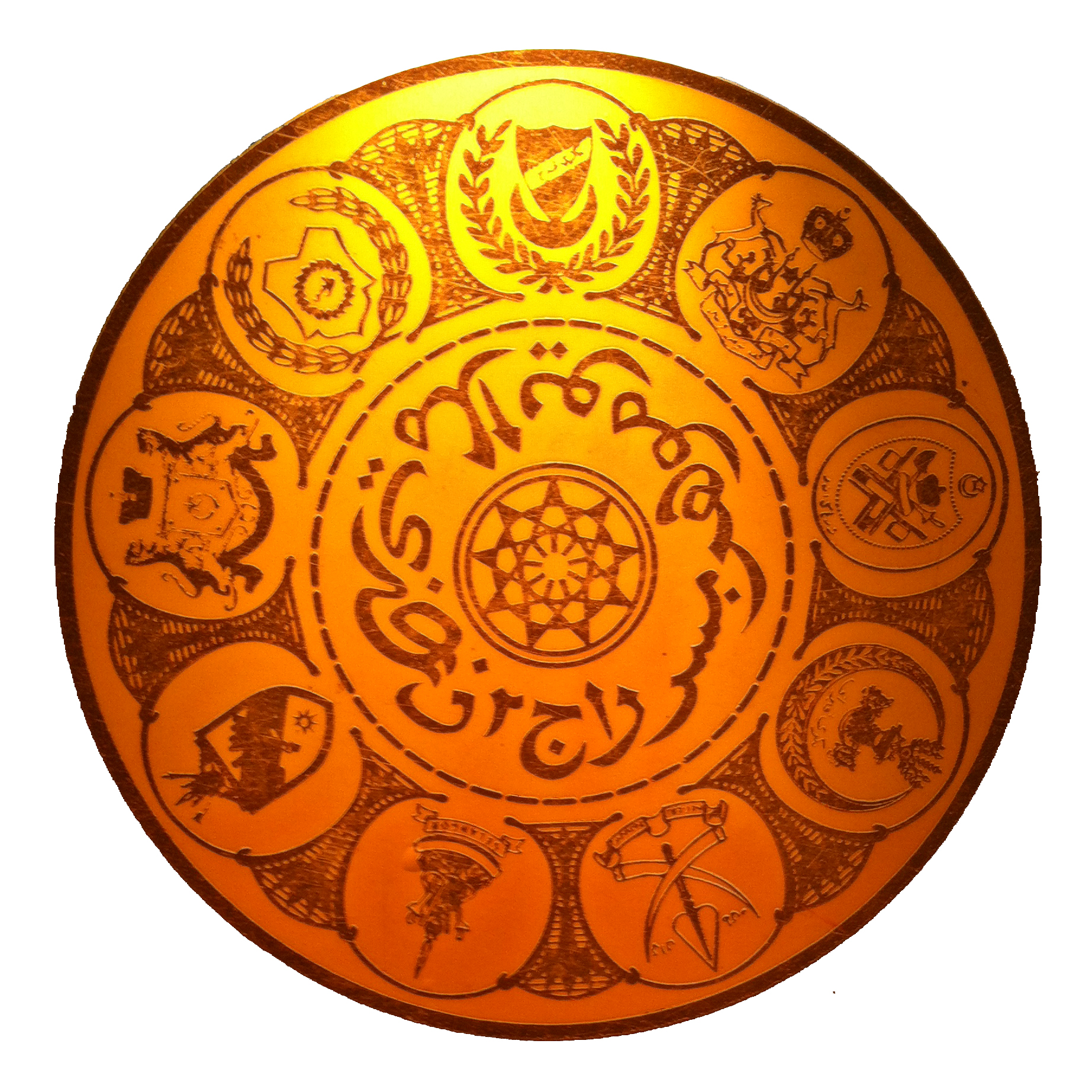
A seal containing the coat of arms of the nine monarchical states, inscribed with the words "Great Seal of the Malay Rulers", written as موهر بسر راج٢ نݢري ملايو in Jawi script, displayed in the Royal Museum, Kuala Lumpur. Clockwise from top: Kedah, Kelantan, Terengganu, Perak, Pahang, Selangor, Negeri Sembilan, Johor and Perlis.

The monarchies of Malaysia exist in each of the nine Malay states under the constitutional monarchy system as practised in Malaysia. The political system of Malaysia is based on the Westminster parliamentary system in combination with features of a federation.

Nine of the states of Malaysia are constitutionally headed by traditional Malay rulers, collectively referred to as the Malay states. State constitutions limit eligibility for the thrones to male Malay Muslims of royal descent. Seven are hereditary monarchies based on agnatic primogeniture: Kedah, Kelantan, Johor, Perlis, Pahang, Selangor and Terengganu. In Perak, the throne rotates among three branches of the royal family loosely based on agnatic seniority. One state, Negeri Sembilan, is an elective monarchy; the ruler is elected from male members of the royal family by hereditary chiefs. All rulers, except those of Perlis and of Negeri Sembilan, use the title of Sultan. The ruler of Perlis is styled the Raja, whereas the ruler of Negeri Sembilan is known as the Yang di-Pertuan Besar.

Every five years or when a vacancy occurs, the rulers convene as the Conference of Rulers (Malay: Majlis Raja-Raja) to elect among themselves the Yang di-Pertuan Agong, the federal constitutional monarch and head of state of Malaysia. As the Yang di-Pertuan Agong is elected among the rulers, Malaysia, as a whole, is also an elective monarchy.

== Roles ==
Each of the nine rulers serves as the head of state of his own state, as well as the head of the religion of Islam in his state. As with other constitutional monarchs around the world, the rulers do not participate in the actual governance in their states; instead, each of them is bound by convention to act on the advice of the head of government of his state, known as Menteri Besar (pl. Menteri-menteri Besar). However, the ruler of each state has discretionary powers in appointing the Menteri Besar that commands a majority in the state legislative assembly, and refusing a dissolution of the state assembly when requested by the Menteri Besar. The powers of the monarchs have been restricted over time, although there is debate about the precise limits of their powers.

The Yang di-Pertuan Agong is the federal head of state. His symbolic roles include being the Commander-in-Chief of the Malaysian Armed Forces, and carrying out diplomatic functions such as receiving foreign diplomats and representing Malaysia on state visits. The Yang di-Pertuan Agong is the head of Islam in his own state, the four states without rulers (Penang, Malacca, Sabah and Sarawak) and the Federal Territories. The Yang di-Pertuan Agong is required to delegate all his state powers to a regent, except for the role of head of Islam. Similar to other rulers, the Yang di-Pertuan Agong acts on the advice of the Prime Minister, and has discretionary powers in appointing the Prime Minister that commands a majority in the Dewan Rakyat, the lower house of the Parliament, and refusing a dissolution of the Parliament. The Yang di-Pertuan Agong also appoints the Yang di-Pertua Negeri, the ceremonial governors for the four states without rulers, on the advice of the Prime Minister and the Chief Ministers of the states.

A unique feature of the constitutional monarchy in Malaysia is the Conference of Rulers, consisting of the nine rulers and the four Yang di-Pertua Negeris. The Conference convenes triannually to discuss various issues related to state and national policies. The most important role of the Conference is to elect the Yang di-Pertuan Agong every five years or when a vacancy occurs. Only the rulers participate in the election of the Yang di-Pertuan Agong, as well as discussions related to rulers' privileges and religious observances. The Conference's other role in the federal governance of the country is to give consent to amendments of certain entrenched provisions of the federal constitution, namely those pertaining to the status of the rulers, the special privileges of the Bumiputra, the status of the Malay language as the national language, and the status of Islam as the religion of the federation.

== History ==
Historically, various Malay kingdoms flourished on the Malay Peninsula. The earliest kingdoms were influenced by Hindu culture, the most notable being Langkasuka in present-day Kedah. In the 15th century, the Malacca Sultanate became the dominant power on the peninsula. The Malacca Sultanate was the first Malay Muslim state based on the peninsula that was also a real regional maritime power. After the fall of Malacca in 1511, several local rulers emerged in the northern part of the peninsula which later fell under Siamese influence, while two princes of the Malaccan royal family founded Johor and Perak respectively. The Sultanate of Johor emerged as the dominant power on the peninsula. The vast territory of Johor led to some areas gaining autonomy, which gradually developed into independent states.

In the 19th century, as various infighting among the Malay aristocracy threatened British economic interests in the region, the British began a policy of intervention. The British concluded treaties with some Malay states, installing "residents" as advisors to the rulers, who soon became the de facto ruling powers of their states. These residents held power in everything except in religious affairs and Malay customs. In 1895, the governance of Negeri Sembilan, Pahang, Perak and Selangor were combined as the Federated Malay States, headed by a Resident General based in Kuala Lumpur. The British wrestled Kedah, Kelantan, Perlis and Terengganu from Siamese influence, and in turn they each received a British "advisor". Johor was the last state to succumb to British pressure, receiving an advisor in 1914. These five states were known as the Unfederated Malay States.

After World War II in 1946, the British combined the Federated Malay States and the Unfederated Malay States, together with two of the Straits Settlements, Penang and Malacca, to form the Malayan Union which was headed by a British governor. Under the terms of the Union, the Malay rulers conceded all their powers to the British Crown except in religious matters. Widespread opposition by Malay nationalists led to the reform of Malayan Union to become the Federation of Malaya in 1948, in which the rulers were restored to their symbolic role as heads of state.

The present form of constitutional monarchy in Malaysia dates from 1957, when the Federation of Malaya gained independence. The rulers serve as constitutional heads of their states, with the state executive powers exercised by state governments elected by the people. The rulers elect among themselves a federal head of state, the Yang di-Pertuan Agong, with the federal executive powers exercised by an elected federal government. The form of constitutional monarchy was retained when Malaysia was formed in 1963.

== Kedah ==
According to the Hikayat Merong Mahawangsa, the Kingdom of Kedah was founded around 630 CE by Maharaja Derbar Raja, who arrived from Gameroon, Persia. The Sultanate of Kedah was founded when the last Hindu king, Phra Ong Mahawangsa, converted to Islam in 1136. He took the name Sultan Mudzafar Shah. Sultan Mudzafar's descendants continue to rule Kedah today.

The seat of the Sultan of Kedah is Anak Bukit, a suburb of Alor Setar.

== Kelantan ==
After centuries of subordination by Majapahit, Malacca, Siam and Terengganu, Long Muhammad, son of Long Yunus, declared himself Sultan in 1800 and gained recognition as a tributary by the Siamese. Control over Kelantan was transferred to the British under the Anglo-Siamese Treaty of 1909.

The state capital is Kota Bharu, while Kubang Kerian serves as the royal city. The main palace for ceremonial functions is Istana Balai Besar, while Istana Negeri serves as the current sultan's residence.

== Johor ==
The early Sultans of Johor claimed to be a continuation of the Malacca Sultanate. The first Sultan, Sultan Alauddin Riayat Shah II was the son of the last Sultan of Malacca, who reigned from 1528. In the 19th century, with support from the British, the Temenggong family gained recognition as rulers of the state. Its first sultan, Maharaja Abu Bakar is known as the founder of "modern Johor". His descendants rule the state today.

The Sultan of Johor resides in the capital, Johor Bahru.

== Negeri Sembilan ==
Negeri Sembilan's monarchy incorporates a form of federalism, whereby the state is divided into smaller luak (chiefdoms), each with a ruling Undang (chieftain). Four of the major chieftains elect the Yang di-Pertuan Besar of Negeri Sembilan, who is the Head of State of Negeri Sembilan.

The first Yang di-Pertuan Besar of Negeri Sembilan was Raja Melewar, who united the nine small states of Negeri Sembilan, each of which were ruled by a local chieftain. He was sent from the Pagaruyung Kingdom at the request of the Minangkabau nobility in the nine small states in the Malay Peninsula in the 18th century. Raja Melewar was succeeded by other princes sent from Pagaruyung, whose sons did not inherit the throne until Raja Raden in 1831, who was the son of Raja Lenggang.

The seat of the Yang di-Pertuan Besar of Negeri Sembilan is Seri Menanti.

=== Chieftains / Undang ===
Chieftains are selected among the nobility in each Luak, following matrilineal inheritance, part of the state's Adat perpatih customs. The Undang of Sungai Ujong is chosen among the Waris Hulu and Waris Hilir families, and inherits the title Dato' Klana Petra. The Undang of Jelebu is elected among the four noble houses, Waris Jelebu, Waris Ulu Jelebu, Waris Sarin and Waris Kemin. Undang of Johol are a succession of members of two families in the female line which are Perut Gemencheh and Perut Johol. The son of the eldest sister of the incumbent is usually the heir. The Undang of Rembau alternates between the two major noble houses in the Luak, namely the Waris Jakun (who inherit the title Dato' Lela Maharaja) and the Waris Jawa (Dato' Sedia di-Raja). As with the undangs of Johol, the son of the eldest sister of the incumbent is the heir in the family.

Luak (District)	Title	Undang (Ruler)	Reign	Ref.
Sungei Ujong	Dato' Klana Petra	Dato' Haji Mubarak bin Dohak (10th, claimant)	1993–2025 (disputed)	
Sungei Ujong	Dato' Klana Petra	Dato' Muhammad Faris bin Johari (11th, de jure)	2026–present (disputed)	
Sungei Ujong	Dato' Klana Petra	Abdul Rahman bin Limat (11th, claimant)	2026–present (disputed)	
Jelebu	Dato' Mendika Menteri Akhirulzaman	Dato' Haji Maarof bin Mat Rashad (16th, claimant)	2019–2026 (disputed)	
Jelebu	Dato' Mendika Menteri Akhirulzaman	Dato' Azrin bin Khairi (17th, de jure)	2026–present (disputed)	
Johol	Dato' Johan Pahlawan Lela Perkasa Sitiawan	Dato' Haji Muhammed bin Abdullah	2016–present	
Rembau	Dato' Sedia Raja	Dato' Haji Abd Rahim bin Yassin (21th, claimant)	2024–2026 (disputed)	
Rembau	Dato' Sedia Raja	Dato' Hassan bin Ab Hamid (22th, de jure)	2026–present (disputed)	

==== Tampin ====
In addition, the district of Tampin has its own hereditary ruler, known as the Tunku Besar. The Tunku Besars of Tampin are descendants of Sharif Sha'aban Syed Ibrahim al-Qadri, the son-in-law of Raja Ali, a member of the state royal family who challenged the reign of the Yang di-Pertuan Besar in the early 19th century.

Luak (District)	Title	Ruler	Reign	Ref.
Tampin	Tunku Besar	Tunku Syed Razman Tunku Syed 'Idrus Al-Qadri (8th)	2005–present	

== Pahang ==
The modern royal house of Pahang is a branch of the royal family of Johor. They held the title of Bendahara. In 1853, the Bendahara, Tun Muhammad Tahir, broke away from the Johor sultan and declared the state of Pahang independent. He was later deposed by his brother Ahmad, who declared himself Sultan in 1884.

The Sultan of Pahang resides in Istana Abdulaziz in Kuantan.

== Perlis ==
Syed Hussein Jamalullail, the sons of Syed Abu Bakar Jamalullail, the chief of Arau, and a daughter of Sultan Dziaddin of Kedah, was recognised as Raja of Perlis by the Siamese after helping them suppress a rebellion by the Raja of Ligor, a microstate in the Pattani region. The Jamalullails are of Arab descent and continue to rule the state of Perlis.

The seat of the Raja of Perlis is Arau.

== Perak ==
The Perak sultanate was founded by the son of the last sultan of Malacca, Sultan Muzaffar Shah. His descendants still live until this day. The Sultan of Perak resides in Istana Iskandariah in Kuala Kangsar.

== Selangor ==
The first Sultan of Selangor was HRH Sultan Salehuddin Shah of Selangor. He took the title as the Sultan in November 1742. He was the son of the famous Bugis warrior Daeng Chelak.

The state of Selangor is on the west coast of Peninsular of Malaysia and is bordered by Perak to the north, Pahang to the east, Negeri Sembilan to the south and the Strait of Malacca to the west. It surrounds the Federal Territories of Kuala Lumpur and Putrajaya, both of which were once under Selangor's territorial sovereignty.

The Sultan of Selangor resides in Istana Alam Shah in Klang.

== Terengganu ==
The state of Terengganu is situated in north-eastern Peninsular Malaysia, and is bordered in the northwest by Kelantan, the southwest by Pahang, and the east by the South China Sea. Several outlying islands, including Pulau Perhentian, Pulau Kapas and Pulau Redang, are also a part of the state.

The Sultan of Terengganu resides in Istana Syarqiyyah in Kuala Terengganu.

== Succession ==
In seven of the Malay states, succession order is generally determined roughly by agnatic primogeniture. No female may become ruler, and female line descendants are generally excluded from succession.

In Negeri Sembilan, the Yang di-Pertuan Besar of Negeri Sembilan of the state is nominally elected by a council of Four Ruling Chieftains (Undang Empat), although succession stays within the state royal family. In 1967, after the death of Tuanku Munawir, his son, Tunku Muhriz was not selected as the next Yang di-Pertuan Besar of Negeri Sembilan because of his youth. Instead, the Chieftains elected his uncle, Tuanku Jaafar, to succeed his father. In 2008, upon the death of Tuanku Jaafar, the Chieftains passed over Jaafar's sons and elected Tunku Muhriz as the next ruler.

In Perak, the throne is rotated among three branches of the royal family. The system originated in the 19th century during the reign of the 18th Sultan of Perak, when it was decided that the throne would rotate among his three sons and their descendants. There are six positions in the order of succession, appointed by the reigning Sultan advised by his Royal Council. Traditionally, the eldest son of the reigning Sultan is placed at the end of the line. When a vacancy occurs in the line of succession, the persons behind in line is typically moved up, and the branch that formerly held the vacant seat is skipped. However, the order of succession is subject to alterations by the Sultan and his Royal Council. For example, in 1987, Sultan Azlan Shah appointed his eldest son, Raja Nazrin Shah as the Raja Muda (first in line to the throne), bypassing the candidates from the other two branches. The appointment was due to the demise of the previous Raja Muda, Raja Ahmed Sifuddin, and the renouncement of the Raja Di-hilir (second in line to the throne), Raja Ahmad Hisham, for health reasons.

The Yang di-Pertuan Agong is elected by and among the nine rulers (excluding minors) every five years or when a vacancy arises (by death, resignation, or deposition by majority vote of the rulers). The Yang di-Pertuan Agong serves a maximum of five years, and may not be re-elected until after all the other states had taken their turns. When the office was established in 1957, the order of seniority of the rulers was based on the length of their reigns on the state thrones. When the first cycle of rotation was completed in 1994, the order of the states in the first cycle became the basis of the order for the second cycle.

== Table of monarchies ==
State	Monarch	Succession	Incumbent	Born	Age	Reigns since	Designated heir
Malaysia	Yang di-Pertuan Agong	elective monarchy	Sultan Ibrahim	22 November 1958	67 years, 361 days old	31 January 2024	None; elected by Conference of Rulers every 5 years or if the incumbent dies or abdicates the federal throne.
Johor	Sultan	agnatic primogeniture	Sultan Ibrahim	22 November 1958	67 years, 361 days old	23 January 2010	Tunku Ismail Idris, the Tunku Mahkota (eldest son)
Kedah	Sultan	agnatic primogeniture	Sultan Sallehuddin	30 April 1942	84 years, 202 days old	11 September 2017	Tengku Sarafudin Badlishah, the Raja Muda (eldest son)
Kelantan	Sultan	agnatic primogeniture	Sultan Muhammad V	6 October 1969	57 years, 43 days old	13 September 2010	Tengku Muhammad Fakhry Petra, the Tengku Mahkota (youngest brother)
Negeri Sembilan	Yang di-Pertuan Besar of Negeri Sembilan	elective monarchy	Tuanku Muhriz	14 January 1948	78 years, 308 days old	29 December 2008	None; elected by the four ruling chieftains (Undangs) from male descendants of the previous Yang di-Pertuan Besar of Negeri Sembilan.
Pahang	Sultan	agnatic primogeniture	Al-Sultan Abdullah Ri'ayatuddin Al-Mustafa Billah Shah	30 July 1959	67 years, 111 days old	11 January 2019	Tengku Hassanal Ibrahim Alam Shah, the Tengku Mahkota (eldest son)
Perak	Sultan	agnatic seniority	Sultan Nazrin Muizzuddin Shah	27 November 1956	69 years, 356 days old	29 May 2014	Raja Jaafar, the Raja Muda (eldest uncle)
Perlis	Raja	agnatic primogeniture	Tuanku Syed Sirajuddin	17 May 1943	83 years, 185 days old	17 April 2000	Tuanku Syed Faizuddin Putra, the Raja Muda (eldest son)
Selangor	Sultan	agnatic primogeniture	Sultan Sharafuddin Idris Shah	24 December 1945	80 years, 329 days old	21 November 2001	Tengku Amir Shah, the Raja Muda (eldest son)
Terengganu	Sultan	agnatic primogeniture	Sultan Mizan Zainal Abidin	22 January 1962	64 years, 300 days old	15 May 1998	Tengku Muhammad Ismail, the Yang di-Pertuan Muda (eldest son)

== Consorts ==
The title of the consort of a monarch is not generally fixed and not automatically obtained by courtesy. A consort may only use a title if it is granted to her either by order of the ruler or during a coronation ceremony. The consorts of different states have different titles, some do not even receive one. The title of a consort in a state may also change depending on the ruler. For instance, the wife of Sultan Ismail Nasiruddin of Terengganu was known as the Tengku Ampuan Besar, while the wife of his grandson Sultan Mizan Zainal Abidin is known as the Sultanah (formerly Permaisuri).

Titles of consorts usually take the form Che Puan/Cik Puan, Raja Perempuan/Raja Permaisuri, Tengku Ampuan/Tengku Permaisuri, Sultanah or Permaisuri.

=== List of consorts ===
State	Monarch	Consort	Title	Tenure
Malaysia	Yang di-Pertuan Agong	Raja Zarith Sofiah	Raja Permaisuri Agong	31 January 2024 – present
Johor	Sultan	Raja Zarith Sofiah	Permaisuri	23 January 2010 – present
Kedah	Sultan	Sultanah Maliha	Sultanah	12 September 2017 – present
Kelantan	Sultan	Sultanah Nur Diana Petra	Sultanah	2 August 2022 – present
Negeri Sembilan	Yang di-Pertuan Besar of Negeri Sembilan	Tuanku Aishah Rohani	Tunku Ampuan Besar	29 December 2008 – present
Pahang	Sultan	Tunku Azizah Aminah Maimunah Iskandariah	Tengku Ampuan	22 January 2019 – present
Perak	Sultan	Tuanku Zara Salim	Raja Permaisuri	20 June 2014 – present
Perlis	Raja	Tuanku Tengku Fauziah	Raja Perempuan	14 July 2000 – present
Selangor	Sultan	Tengku Permaisuri Norashikin	Tengku Permaisuri	8 Sept 2016–present
Terengganu	Sultan	Permaisuri Nur Zahirah	Permaisuri	19 July 1998 – 5 June 2006
Terengganu	Sultan	Permaisuri Nur Zahirah	Sultanah	5 June 2006 – present

== Royal capitals ==
The royal capitals (Malay: Bandar diraja) are the cities and towns where the official residences of the rulers are situated. In some states, the royal capital is different from the administrative capital.

The Yang di-Pertuan Agong resides in Kuala Lumpur.

States	Royal capital	State capital	Ruler title
Johor	Muar	Johor Bahru	Sultan
Kedah	Alor Setar (Anak Bukit)	Alor Setar	Sultan
Kelantan	Kota Bharu (Kubang Kerian)	Kota Bharu	Sultan
Negeri Sembilan	Seri Menanti	Seremban	Yang di-Pertuan Besar
Pahang	Pekan	Kuantan	Sultan
Perak	Kuala Kangsar	Ipoh	Sultan
Perlis	Arau	Kangar	Raja
Selangor	Klang	Shah Alam	Sultan
Terengganu	Kuala Terengganu	Kuala Terengganu	Sultan

== Living former consorts ==
- Tunku Puan Nora (dowager of Sultan Ismail)
- Raja Permaisuri Tuanku Bainun (dowager of Sultan Azlan Muhibuddin Shah)
- Permaisuri Siti Aishah (dowager of Sultan Salahuddin Abdul Aziz Shah)
- Che Puan Besar Haminah (dowager of Sultan Abdul Halim Mu'adzam Shah)
- Cik Puan Besar Kalsom (dowager of Sultan Ahmad Shah)
- Raja Perempuan Tengku Anis (dowager of Sultan Ismail Petra)
