= Tunku Annuar =

- Tunku Bendahara of Kedah

Chairman of the Council of Regency of Kedah
- Tenure: 13 December 2011 – 21 May 2014
- Predecessor: None
- Successor: Tunku Mahmud Sallehuddin
- Born: 30 June 1937; Anak Bukit, Alor Setar, Kedah
- Died: 21 May 2014 (aged 76); Ipoh, Perak
- Burial: Langgar Royal Mausoleum
- Spouse: Sharifah Saleha Syed Omar Shahabuddin (m. 1962, div.); Noor Suzanna Abdullah
- Issue: Tunku Marina; Tunku Putra Badlishah; Tunku Azudin Shah; Tunku Johanez; Tunku Harunnarasheed Putra
- House: Mahawangsa
- Father: Sultan Badlishah
- Mother: Sultanah Asma

Tunku Annuar ibni Almarhum Sultan Badlishah (30 June 1937 – 21 May 2014) was a member of the Kedah royal family and the Chairman of the Regency Council of the Malaysian state of Kedah from December 2011 until his death in May 2014. He was the son of Sultan Badlishah and the half-brother of Sultan Abdul Halim.

== Biography ==
Tunku Annuar was born on 30 June 1937. He was the first son of Tunku Badlishah by his second wife, Tengku Asma Sultan Sulaiman. His father, Tunku Badlishah, was the seventh son of Sultan Abdul Hamid Halim. His mother, Tengku Asma, was a daughter of Sultan Sulaiman Badrul Alam Shah of Terengganu. She was crowned Sultanah of Kedah in 1943. Tunku Badlishah was appointed Raja Muda (Crown Prince) of Kedah in 1935 and became sultan in 1943. His full brother from the same father and mother was the current Sultan of Kedah, Tunku Sallehuddin.

Tunku Annuar was educated at Malay College Kuala Kangsar then pursue his study at Australian Army Staff College, Fort Queenscliff. He was granted the title Tunku Temenggong of Kedah on 21 January 1979. He was then granted the title Tunku Bendahara of Kedah as the second heir to the throne after the Raja Muda of Kedah on 28 November 1981.

On 12 December 2011, he was appointed the Chairman of the Council of Regency after Tuanku Abdul Halim became Yang di-Pertuan Agong. Other members of the council include his brothers Tunku Sallehuddin, Tunku Abdul Hamid Thani, and Tuanku Abdul Halim's daughter Tunku Puteri Intan Safinaz.

== Marriages and children ==
Tunku Annuar married Sharifah Saleha Syed Omar Shahabuddin on 22 January 1962. They had four children:

- Tunku Marina (18 October 1962)
- Tunku Putra Badlishah (born 6 September 1964), who married Wan Zainab Wan Mahmud (born 30 July 1964) on 5 February 1987 and has four children:
  - Y.M. Tunku Putri Nadia
  - Y.M. Tunku Intan Nazirah
  - Y.M. Tunku Asma Narissa
  - Y.M. Tunku Annuar Nazirshah
  - Y.M. Putri Alyssa Batrisha
- Tunku Azuddin Shah (born 1969), who married Paula Malai Ali (born 3 March 1974) on 23 September 2002. They divorced in 2006. Puan Anna Baris (b. 10 February 198x), educ. Lyceum No 7, and Tomsk State Pedagogical Univ (TSPU), Tomsk, Russia. He has issue, two sons and one daughter by his second wife:
  - Y.M. Tunku Danil Badlishah bin Tunku Azudin Shah. b. 2010.
  - Y.M. Tunku Kiril Badlishah bin Tunku Azudin Shah. b 2015
  - Y.M. Tunku Ivanna binti Tunku Azudin Shah. b. July 2012
- Tunku Johanez (s/o Sharifa Saleha), educ. Sri Petaling Sch, Petaling Jaya, Selangor, and Malay Coll, Kuala Kangsar, Perak. Dir Client Services at Krakatua/ICOM 2010, MD Shahril Assocs Advertising & Design Sdn Bhd. Chair Felab Engineering Sdn Bhd, You Wings Sdn Bhd, and Masmeyer Success Sdn Bhd. Exec Chair Bumi Aviation Sdn Bhd. Mbr Royal Selangor Golf Club. Rcvd: DSDK (19.1.2014). m. (first) (div.) Che’ Wawa. m. (second) Y.A.Bhg. Datin Sophia binti ‘Abdu’llah, née Winnie Sophia Low, daughter Y.Bhg. Tan Sri Dato’ Low Kheng Huat, Chair Low Keng Huat (Singapore) Ltd, by his wife, Y.Bhg. Puan Sri Dato’ Molly Low. He has issue, three sons and one daughter (including triplets) by his second wife:
  - Y.M. Tunku ... bin Tunku Johanez Mansur. b
  - Y.M. Tunku ... bin Tunku Johanez Mansur. b
  - Y.M. Tunku Jayden Jian bin Tunku Johanez Mansur. b. 10 July 2008. Mbr Kuala Lumpur Youth Soccer Club.
  - Y.M. Tunku ... binti Tunku Johanez Mansur.

His second wife was Puan Sri Dato’ Seri Noor Suzanna Abdullah. Noor Suzanna has been involved in various charity events for flood victims in Kedah. The couple had one son.

- Dato' Indera Tunku Harunnarasheed Putra, who married Amelia Henderson on 14 August 2015, but divorced in 2018. On 27 February 2023, he married Singaporean painter and Islamic calligrapher Datin Indera Tania Yasmin Mohammed Shaafi.

== Death and funeral ==
Tunku Annuar died at 12:20 am on 21 May 2014 at Pantai Hospital in Ipoh, Perak, of a heart attack. He was 76. His body was laid to rest at the Kedah Royal Mausoleum in Langgar, Kedah, after Asr prayers.

Before his death, he was presumably thought to be the successor to the throne of Kedah, since the Raja Muda (Crown Prince) who his elder half-brother, Tunku Abdul Malik was considered incapacitated due to old age, and then the subsequent successors will follow his lineage. Due to his death, his descendants has been by-passed and his younger brother, Tunku Sallehuddin was proclaimed the next heir and Raja Muda of Kedah on 15 December 2016.

Under lineal primogeniture or the doctrine of ‘representation in blood’, Tunku Annuar’s descendants are the true heir of the Badlishah dynasty. Lineal primogeniture determine that the throne is passed through the sons of the eldest son.

== Honours ==
He was awarded:

=== Honours of Kedah ===
- Member of the Halimi Family Order of Kedah (DKH) (16.7.2008)
- Member of the Supreme Order of Sri Mahawangsa (DMK) – Dato' Seri Utama
- Knight Grand Commander of the Exalted Order of the Crown of Kedah (SPMK) – Dato' Seri
- Knight Grand Companion of the Order of Loyalty to the Royal House of Kedah (SSDK) – Dato' Seri
- Sultan Badlishah Medal for Faithful and Loyal Service (PSB)

=== Honours of Malaysia ===
- Malaysia
  - Commander of the Order of Loyalty to the Crown of Malaysia (PSM) – Tan Sri (2012)

His wife, Noor Suzanna Abdullah, was awarded :

=== Honours of Kedah ===
- Knight Grand Companion of the Order of Loyalty to the Royal House of Kedah (SSDK) – Dato' Seri (12.12.2011)
