= Sultanah of Kedah =

Royal consorts to the Sultan of Kedah

- State

Incumbent
- Royal standard of the Sultanah of Kedah
- Sultanah Maliha since 12 September 2017

Details
- Style: Her Royal Highness
- Formed: 1943; 83 years ago
- Residences: Anak Bukit Palace, Alor Setar
- Appointer: Sultan of Kedah

Sultanah of Kedah is the title given to the consorts of the incumbent Sultan of the Malaysian State of Kedah. The title was introduced by Sultan Badlishah on 13 May 1943. Previous consorts of the Sultan of Kedah given no any official title. Sultanah is styled as Her Royal Highness (Malay:Kebawah Duli Yang Maha Mulia).

Like many spouses of heads of state, the Sultanah of Kedah has no stipulated role or duties in the Kedah State Constitution. However, she accompanies the Sultan of Kedah to official functions and state visits, as well as hosting visiting heads of state and their spouses.

== List of Sultanahs ==
	Regnal name	Reign	Sultan	Born	Death	Notes
1	Sultanah Asma Binti Almarhum Sultan Sulaiman Badrul Alam Shah	13 May 1943 - 13 July 1958	Sultan Sir Badlishah ibni Almarhum Sultan Abdul Hamid Halim Shah	25 October 1917	13 May 1996	The first Sultanah of Kedah
2	Sultanah Bahiyah binti Almarhum Tuanku Abdul Rahman	15 July 1958 - 26 August 2003	Al-Sultan Abdul Halim Mu'adzam Shah ibni Almarhum Sultan Badlishah	24 August 1930	26 August 2003	Also reigned as The Raja Permaisuri Agong of Malaysia from 20 September 1970 until 21 September 1975
3	Sultanah Haminah binti Hamidun	21 November 2003 – 11 September 2017	Al-Sultan Abdul Halim Mu'adzam Shah ibni Almarhum Sultan Badlishah	15 July 1953		Also reigned as The Raja Permaisuri Agong of Malaysia from 13 December 2011 – 12 December 2016
4	Sultanah Maliha binti Almarhum Tengku Ariff	12 September 2017 – present	Sultan Sallehuddin ibni Almarhum Sultan Badlishah	13 April 1949		

=== Living former Sultanahs ===
- Che Puan Besar Haminah (reigned, 21 November 2003 – 11 September 2017)

== See also ==
- Sultanate of Kedah
- Yang Di-Pertuan Agong (King of Malaysia)
- Raja Permaisuri Agong (Queen of Malaysia)
- Merong Mahawangsa (Legendary King of Kedah)
- Sultana (title)
