= Zaheeda Mohamad Ariff =

Consort of the Crown Prince of Kedah (born 1971)

Zaheeda زاهدة

Raja Puan Muda of Kedah
- Tenure: 26 November 2017 – present
- Predecessor: Tengku Maliha
- Born: Zaheeda Banu binti Mohamad Ariff; 19 October 1971 (age 54); Ipoh, Perak
- Spouse: Tengku Sarafudin Badlishah (m. 2003)
- Issue: Tunku Zara Bahiyah; Tunku Sulaiman Badlishah
Regnal name
- Che Puan Muda Zaheeda binti Mohamad Ariff
- House: Mahawangsa (by marriage)
- Father: Mohamad Ariff
- Religion: Sunni Islam

Che Puan Muda Zaheeda binti Mohamad Ariff (Jawi: چئ ڤوان مودا زاهدة بنت محمد عارف; born Zaheeda Banu binti Mohamad Ariff; 19 October 1971) is the Raja Puan Muda (Crown Princess) of Kedah as the wife of Tengku Sarafudin Badlishah, the Raja Muda (Crown Prince) of Kedah.

== Education and career ==
Che Puan Muda Zaheeda graduated with an honours law degree from the Cardiff College, University of Wales and subsequently obtained a master's degree in Commercial Law from the University of Bristol. She obtained a certificate in legal practice (honours) from the Legal Profession Qualifying Board of Malaysia and was admitted as an advocate and solicitor in 1996.

She has also served as head of the Legal and Secretariat Division of Selangor Water Supply Company (SYABAS) and also held the same position at Kumpulan Darul Ehsan Berhad.

Before serving with Syarikat Bekalan Air Selangor, she also held the position of legal general manager with Indah Water Konsortium Sdn Bhd from 2008 to 2014. She also holds the qualification of statutory arbitrator from the Chartered Institute of Arbitrators.

== Raja Puan Muda of Kedah ==
Che Puan Muda Zaheeda was proclaimed as the Raja Puan Muda of Kedah upon her husband's installation as the Raja Muda of Kedah on 26 November 2017 upon her father-in-law, Sultan Sallehuddin ibni Almarhum Sultan Badlishah's accession as the 29th Sultan of Kedah. As a commoner, she was bestowed upon her the honorific prefix of Che Puan Muda before her given names. Prior to being proclaimed as the Raja Puan Muda of Kedah, she was titled as the Toh Puan Laksamana of Kedah.

== Personal life ==
Che Puan Muda Zaheeda married Tengku Sarafudin Badlishah in 2003. The couple have two children:

- Tunku Zara Bahiyah (born 11 April 2004)
- Tunku Sulaiman Badlishah (born 18 December 2007)

== Issue ==
| Name | Birth | Place birth | Age |
|---|---|---|---|
| Her Highness (Yang Teramat Mulia); Tunku Zara Bahiyah Binti Tengku Sarafudin Badlishah | 11 April 2004 | Kedah | 22 years, 1 month and 29 days |
| His Highness (Yang Teramat Mulia); Tunku Sulaiman Badlishah Bin Tengku Sarafudin Badlishah | 18 December 2007 | Kedah | 18 years, 5 months and 22 days |

== Styles and honours ==
Styles of Che Puan Muda Zaheeda
- Reference style: Her Royal Highness
- Spoken style: Your Royal Highness
- Alternative style: Tuanku

- Member of the Royal Family Order of Sultan Sallehuddin (DKS) (19 June 2022)
- Knight Grand Commander of the Order of the Crown of Kedah (SPMK) – Dato' Seri (21 January 2018)

Zaheeda Mohamad Ariff House of Kedah
Regnal titles
| Preceded by Tengku Maliha | Raja Puan Muda of Kedah; 2017–present | Incumbent |
