= Tunku Shazuddin Ariff =

Tunku Mahkota of Kedah (born 1970)

Tunku Shazuddin Ariff تونكو شاز الدين عارف

Tunku Mahkota of Kedah
- Proclaimed: 19 June 2022 - present
- Born: Tunku Shazuddin Ariff ibni Tunku Mahmud Sallehuddin; 27 April 1970 (age 56); Alor Setar, Kedah, Malaysia
- Spouse: Che Puan Nur Julie Ariff (m. 2022)
Names
- Tunku Shazuddin Ariff ibni Al-Aminul Karim Sultan Sallehuddin
- House: Mahawangsa
- Father: Al-Aminul Karim Sultan Sallehuddin
- Mother: Sultanah Maliha
- Religion: Sunni Islam

Tunku Shazuddin Ariff ibni Al-Aminul Karim Sultan Sallehuddin (Jawi: تونكو شاز الدين عارف ابن الأمين الكريم سلطان صالح الدين; born 27 April 1970) is the current Tunku Mahkota of Kedah.

== Biography ==
Tunku Shazuddin Ariff was born on 27 April 1970 in Alor Setar, Kedah. He is the youngest son of Al-Aminul Karim Sultan Sallehuddin ibni Almarhum Sultan Badlishah and Sultanah Maliha binti Almarhum Tengku Ariff. His father was the seventh son of the 27th Sultan of Kedah, Sultan Badlishah and Sultanah Asma, the Sultanah of Kedah. Tunku Shazuddin has one elder brother, Tengku Sarafudin Badlishah, who is the current Raja Muda (Crown Prince) of Kedah.

He received his early education at Sekolah Rendah Sri Petaling from 1977 to 1982 and his secondary education at Sekolah Menengah Bukit Bintang from 1982 to 1987. He later continued with his studies at KDU University College from 1989 to 1990. He attended Kansas Wesleyan University from 1990 to 1994 and graduated with a major in design and marketing.

== Tunku Laksamana of Kedah ==
Tunku Shazuddin previously became the Tunku Laksamana of Kedah on 26 November 2017 before being proclaimed as the Tunku Mahkota of Kedah.

== Tunku Mahkota of Kedah ==
Tunku Shazuddin was proclaimed as the Tunku Mahkota of Kedah on 19 June 2022.

== Personal life ==
On 26 November 2022, Tunku Shazuddin married Che Puan Nur Julie Ariff (née Julie Gwee Chai Hong), a commoner of Chinese descent. On the same day, Tunku Shazuddin's father, Al-Aminul Karim Sultan Sallehuddin Ibni Almarhum Sultan Badlishah bestowed upon Che Puan Nur Julie Ariff with the honorific prefix of Che Puan (equivalent to the English "Lady") as a royal prince's consort who is not of royal but commoner birth and the royal title of Her Highness Tunku Puan Mahkota of Kedah.

== Honours ==
He has been awarded:

- Kedah
  - Knight Grand Companion of the Order of Loyalty to Sultan Sallehuddin of Kedah (SSSK) – Dato' Seri Diraja (25 August 2019)
  - Knight Companion of the Order of Loyalty to the Royal House of Kedah (DSDK) – Dato' (19 January 2014)
  - Companion of the Order of Loyalty to Sultan Abdul Halim Mu'adzam Shah (SMS) (18 January 2009)
  - Recipient of the Golden Jubilee Medal (15 July 2008)
  - Recipient of the Sultan Sallehuddin Installation Medal (22 October 2018)

His wife Che Puan Nur Julie Ariff, Tunku Puan Mahkota of Kedah has been awarded:

- Kedah
  - Knight Grand Companion of the Order of Loyalty to Sultan Sallehuddin of Kedah (SSSK) – Dato' Seri Diraja (18 June 2023)

Tunku Shazuddin Ariff House of Kedah
Regnal titles
Preceded by position created	Tunku Mahkota of Kedah; 2022–present	Incumbent
