= Tunku Puteri Intan Safinaz =

Princess of Kedah

Tunku Temenggong of Kedah
- Tenure: 15 January 2017 – present
- Predecessor: Tunku Sallehuddin

Tunku Panglima Besar of Kedah
- Tenure: 17 January 2009 – 15 January 2017
- Born: Tunku Puteri Intan Safinaz binti Sultan Abdul Halim Mu'adzam Shah; 22 July 1966 (age 60); Alor Setar, Kedah, Malaysia
Names
- Tunku Puteri Intan Safinaz binti Almarhum Sultan Abdul Halim Mu'adzam Shah
- House: Mahawangsa
- Father: Sultan Abdul Halim Mu’adzam Shah
- Mother: Sultanah Bahiyah
- Religion: Islam

Tunku Puteri Intan Safinaz Binti Almarhum Sultan Abdul Halim Mu’adzam Shah (born 22 July 1966) is the Tunku Temenggong of Kedah. She is the daughter of the 28th Sultan Kedah, Sultan Abdul Halim Mu’adzam Shah and Sultanah Bahiyah.

== Early life ==
Tunku Puteri Intan Safinaz was born on 22 July 1966 in Alor Setar, Kedah. She is the youngest daughter of Sultan Abdul Halim and Sultanah Bahiyah. She also has two adopted siblings, Tunku Soraya and Tunku Sarina (deceased 1991). The twin adopted siblings were actually her cousins, i.e. daughters of Tunku Hamidah, who is the eldest sister of Tuanku Al-Haj Abdul Halim Muadzam Shah.

== Education ==
Tunku Puteri Intan Safinaz received her primary education at the St Nicholas Convent, Alor Star, and her secondary education at the Kolej Tunku Kurshiah, Seremban. She continued her studies at Cheltenham Ladies College in the United Kingdom. She received her degree in politics from the University of Sussex in 1987.

== Career ==
=== Corporate ===
Tunku Puteri Intan Safinaz worked in Sime Darby Berhad in Kuala Lumpur for six years, where she was attached to the communications, industrial relations and corporate planning departments. She then left the company to focus her attention on working on community-based initiatives, especially in Kedah.

On 2 May 2023, Tunku Puteri Intan Safinaz was appointed to the Nestle board of directors, bringing in her extensive experience and achievements in social activism and humanitarian efforts in alignment with the company's environmental, social and governance agenda.

=== Sultanah Bahiyah Foundation ===
Tunku Puteri formed a charitable foundation in August 1996, the Sultanah Bahiyah Foundation, named after her late mother, the Sultanah of Kedah. As the chairperson, the foundation aims to act as agents of social change through education, community development, health, children and youth development. The foundation implements welfare projects, training initiatives and provides financial grants to non-governmental organisations (NGOs) and corporate bodies who function as implementing partners.

=== Military ===
Tunku Puteri was commissioned as the commander of the Territorial Army regiment in Kedah in 2007 and holds the rank of Brigadier General. She was previously the commander of the 513 AW regiment for over 14 years before handing over the reins to Brig Jen Tengku Sarafudin Badlishah Sultan Sallehuddin. She is currently the commander for the 509 AW regiment in Penang.

=== Environment ===
Tunku Puteri was appointed as Royal Fellow of the Institute of Environment and Sustainable Development of the Universiti Kebangsaan Malaysia (UKM) in 2007. She also serves as the Royal Patron for the Langkawi Geopark since 2011.

== Red Cross and Red Crescent Movement ==
=== Malaysian Red Crescent ===
Tunku Puteri Intan Safinaz was appointed the new chairperson of the Malaysian Red Crescent in July 2018, taking over from Tunku Tan Sri Shahriman Tunku Sulaiman for the 2018–2021 term.

She is the first female chairperson to lead the humanitarian voluntary organisation since its inception in 1948. Tunku Puteri Intan Safinaz said she was looking forward to seeing active participation of youngsters in the organisation, as well as improving communication between MRC and the local communities especially in the rural areas.

=== IFRC Governing Board ===
Tunku Puteri was elected for a four-year term (2022 to 2026) on the governing board of the International Federation of Red Cross and Red Crescent Societies (IFRC). She was voted into office at the IFRC's 23rd General Assembly held in Geneva, with the view of working collectively to support the priorities identified by the SEA RCRC National Societies, and strengthening the voice of the region in the governing board. Tunku Puteri stated that she will continue to prioritise youth as a powerful catalyst for change and continue to carry out humanitarian activities aimed at preventing and alleviating human suffering and contributing to the promotion of world peace.

== Honours ==
=== Honours of Malaysia ===
- Malaysia
  - Commander of the Order of Loyalty to the Crown of Malaysia (PSM) – Tan Sri (2012)
- Malaysian Armed Forces
  - Warrior of the Order of Military Service of Malaysia (PAT) (2010)
- Kedah
  - Member of the Halimi Family Order of Kedah (DKH) (2008)
  - Grand Commander of the Order of Sultan Abdul Halim Muadzam Shah (SHMS) – Dato' Seri Diraja (2011)
  - Knight Grand Companion of the Order of Loyalty to the Royal House of Kedah (SSDK) – Dato' Seri (1998)
  - Justice of Peace (JP) (2004)
- Negeri Sembilan
  - Recipient of the Royal Family Order of Yam Tuan Radin Sunnah (DKYR) (2005)

=== Honorary degrees ===
- Malaysia
  - Honorary Ph.D. degree in Social Work Management from Universiti Utara Malaysia (2010)
  - Honorary Ph.D. degree in Community Development from Kolej Universiti INSANIAH (2011)
  - Honorary Ph.D. degree in Resource Management from Universiti Pertahanan Nasional Malaysia (2018)
