= Sultanah Bahiyah =

Raja Permaisuri Agong from 1970 to 1975

Bahiyah باهية

Queen consort of Malaysia
- Tenure: 21 September 1970 – 20 September 1975
- Installation: 20 February 1971
- Predecessor: Tengku Intan Zaharah
- Successor: Tengku Zainab

Sultanah of Kedah
- Tenure: 15 July 1958 – 26 August 2003
- Installation: 20 February 1959
- Predecessor: Sultanah Asma
- Successor: Sultanah Haminah
- Born: 24 August 1930; Seri Menanti, Negeri Sembilan
- Died: 26 August 2003 (aged 73); Istana Kuala Cegar, Alor Setar, Kedah
- Burial: 27 August 2003; Kedah Royal Mausoleum, Alor Setar, Kedah
- Spouse: Al-Mu’tassimu Billahi Muhibbuddin Sultan Abdul Halim Muadzam Shah ibni Almarhum Sultan Badlishah (m. 1956)
- Issue: Tunku Puteri Intan Safinaz; Tunku Soraya (adopted); Tunku Sarina (adopted)
Names
- Tunku Bahiyah binti Tunku Abdul Rahman
Regnal name
- Sultanah Bahiyah binti Almarhum Tuanku Abdul Rahman
- House: Pagaruyung; Mahawangsa (by marriage)
- Father: Tuanku Abdul Rahman ibni Almarhum Tuanku Muhammad
- Mother: Tunku Kurshiah binti Almarhum Tunku Besar Burhanuddin
- Religion: Sunni Islam

Sultanah Hajah Bahiyah binti Almarhum Tuanku Abdul Rahman (Jawi: سلطانة حاجة باهية بنت المرحوم توانكو عبدالرحمن; 24 August 1930 – 26 August 2003) was the Sultanah of Kedah from 1958 until her death in 2003 and served as the 5th Raja Permaisuri Agong (Queen of Malaysia) from 21 September 1970 until 20 September 1975.

== Early life ==
Tunku Bahiyah was born on 24 August 1930 in Seri Menanti, Negeri Sembilan. She was the eldest daughter of Tuanku Abdul Rahman and his third wife Tunku Kurshiah, the Yang di-Pertuan Besar and the Tunku Ampuan Besar of Negeri Sembilan, who were then elected as the first Yang di-Pertuan Agong and Raja Permaisuri Agong of Malaysia.

She received her education at a Malay School in Seri Menanti and the Seremban Convent School. She later furthered her studies in the United Kingdom and received a degree in Social Science from University of Nottingham.

== Marriage ==
Tunku Bahiyah married Abdul Halim of Kedah in 1956. The royal couple adopted the twin daughters of Tunku Hamidah (Tuanku Abdul Halim's eldest sister), Tunku Soraya and Tunku Sarina (born 30 April 1960, adopted 3 May 1960). Bahiyah gave birth to a daughter, Tunku Puteri Intan Safinaz, on 22 July 1966.

Tunku Soraya would go on to marry Raja Iskandar Dzurkarnain (the current Raja Di-Hilir of Perak) in 1986. Tunku Sarina died on 31 August 1991.

== Becoming queen ==
In 1958, Tuanku Abdul Halim became Sultan of Kedah. Upon his ascension to the throne, Tunku Bahiyah was installed as the Sultanah of Kedah.

From 1970 to 1975, she served her five-year term as Raja Permaisuri Agong of Malaysia when Tuanku Abdul Halim became the fifth Yang di-Pertuan Agong.

== Death ==
She died in her sleep at 12:23 pm of cancer and old age on 26 August 2003 at Istana Kuala Cegar two days after her 73rd birthday, Alor Setar. She was laid to rest at the Langgar Royal Mausoleum in Alor Setar.

== Awards and recognition ==
Sultanah Bahiyah was honored with various awards, both locally and abroad. In 1970, Emperor Hirohito of Japan awarded her the First Class of the Order of the Sacred Treasure. Later in the same year, President Suharto of Indonesia awarded her the First Class of the Order of the Star of Mahaputera.

In 1973, King Bhumibol Adulyadej of Thailand awarded her the Grand Cross of the Order of Chula Chom Klao.

Sultanah Bahiyah was awarded an Honorary Doctorate in Education by the University of Malaya where she served as the Chancellor from 1972 until 1986.

The general hospital in Alor Setar which is also the main referral and tertiary health centre in Northern Peninsular Malaysia was renamed in her honour to Sultanah Bahiyah Hospital.

A highway in Alor Setar, Sultanah Bahiyah Highway (Federal Route 255) was named after her.

A secondary school in Alor Setar, SMK Sultanah Bahiyah, was named after her.

A mosque in Alor Setar, Sultanah Bahiyah Mosque, was named after her.

Sultanah Bahiyah Library of Universiti Utara Malaysia was named after her.

Tuanku Bahiyah Residential College, a residential college at University of Malaya, Kuala Lumpur was named in honour of her.

== Social contributions ==
Tuanku Hajah Bahiyah was the patron of various organisations such as:

- Kedah Orchid Association
- Blood Donors Association of Malaysia
- Family Planning Association of Kedah
- Children’s Welfare Organisation of Kedah
- Islamic Women’s Welfare Organisation of Kedah
- Lioness Club of Kedah
- Netball Association of Kedah
- Women’s Association of Universiti Utara Malaysia (SUTRANITA)
- Nottingham Graduates Association
- Ex-Servicemen Widows and Wives Association (BAKIABAH)
- Kedah Association for the Disabled
- Kedah Thalassaemia Association
- Association of Sultanah Bahiyah Secondary School Students

== Honours ==
She has been awarded:

=== Honours of Kedah ===
- Member of the Royal Family Order of Kedah (DK) (29 February 1964)
- Member of the Halimi Family Order of Kedah (DKH) (January 1976)
- Knight Grand Commander of the Exalted Order of the Crown of Kedah (SPMK) – Dato' Seri (19 February 1971)

=== Honours of Malaysia ===
- Malaysia
  - Recipient of the Order of the Crown of the Realm (DMN) (19 February 1971)
  - Grand Commander of the Order of the Defender of the Realm (SMN) – Tun (19 February 1959)
- Johor
  - First Class of the Royal Family Order of Johor (DK I) (February 1989)
- Kelantan
  - Recipient of the Royal Family Order of Kelantan (DK) (August 1996)
- Negeri Sembilan
  - Member of the Royal Family Order of Negeri Sembilan (DKNS) (19 July 1996)

=== Foreign Honours ===
- Indonesia
  - First Class of the Star of Mahaputera (Bintang Mahaputera Adipurna) (16 March 1970)
- Imperial State of Iran
  - First Class of the Order of the Pleiades (1974)
  - Commemorative Medal of the 2500th Anniversary of the founding of the Persian Empire (14 October 1971).
- Japan
  - Dame Grand Cordon of the Order of the Sacred Treasure (1970)
- Thailand
  - Dame Grand Cross of the Order of Chula Chom Klao (1 February 1973)

== See also ==
- Yang Di-Pertuan Agong
- Raja Permaisuri Agong

Malaysian royalty
Preceded by Tengku Intan Zaharah (Tengku Ampuan Besar of Terengganu)	Raja Permaisuri Agong (Queen of Malaysia)	Succeeded by Tengku Zainab (Raja Perempuan of Kelantan)
