= Order of Loyalty to Sultan Sallehuddin of Kedah =

Order of Loyalty to Sultan Sallehuddin of Kedah Darjah Kebesaran Seri Setia Sultan Sallehuddin Kedah Yang Amat Dihormati
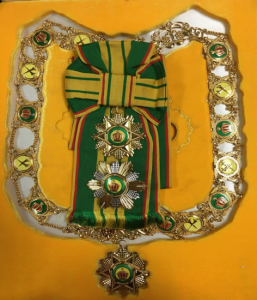
- Collar, sash and breast star of Knight Grand Companion

Awarded by Sultan of Kedah
- Type: Order
- Status: Currently constituted
- Sovereign: Sallehuddin of Kedah
- Grades: Knight Grand Companion (SSSK), Knight Commander (DPSS), Knight Companion (DSSS), Companion (SSS), Star (BSS)

Statistics
- First induction: 2018
- Last induction: 2024

Precedence
- Next (higher): State of Kedah Star of Gallantry
- Next (lower): Glorious Order of the Crown of Kedah
- Equivalent: Order of Loyalty to Sultan 'Abdu'l Halim Mu'azzam Shah (dormant)
- Knight Grand Companion Knight Commander Knight Companion Companion Star; Ribbon bar of the order

The Most Esteemed Order of Loyalty to Sultan Sallehuddin of Kedah (Bahasa Melayu: Darjah Kebesaran Seri Setia Sultan Sallehuddin Kedah Yang Amat Dihormati) is an honorific order of the Sultanate of Kedah.

== History ==
It was founded by Sultan Sallehuddin on 30 April 2018 in five classes.

== Classes ==
It is awarded in five classes:

=== Knight Grand Companion ===
- Knight Grand Companion of the Most Esteemed Order of Loyalty to Sultan Sallehuddin of Kedah (S.S.S.K.) (Malay: Darjah Seri Setia Sultan Sallehuddin Kedah Yang Amat Dihormati)

The rank is conferred on those in high positions who have performed meritorious services to the State and Nation. The recipient of this award receives the title Dato' Seri Diraja and his wife Datin Seri Diraja.

The insignia is composed of a collar, a sash and a breast star. The collar made of silver, gold-plated and colourful (enamel) green, yellow and red on certain parts and it consists twelve-pointed star with ted crowns and crossed dagger symbols. The sash is of green silk and has three yellow stripes on the middle and yellow-red stripes on both the edges. The breast star made of silver and consist five layers that plated with gold and coloured with enamel and consists twelve-pointed star with ted crown symbols.

=== Knight Commander ===
- Knight Commander of the Most Esteemed Order of Loyalty to Sultan Sallehuddin of Kedah (D.P.S.S.) (Malay: Darjah Dato' Paduka Seri Setia Sultan Sallehuddin Kedah Yang Amat Dihormati)

The rank is conferred on those who have contributed to the community and the State and have high positions and have high influence. The recipient of this award receives the title Dato' Paduka and his wife Datin Paduka.

The insignia is composed of a sash and a breast star. The sash is of green silk and has a large yellow stripes and two small yellow stripes on both side separated by two small green stripes on middle and yellow-red stripes on both the edges. The breast star made of silver and consist five layers that plated with gold and coloured with enamel and consists twelve-pointed star with ted crown symbols.

=== Knight Companion ===
- Knight Companion of the Most Esteemed Order of Loyalty to Sultan Sallehuddin of Kedah (D.S.S.S.) (Malay: Darjah Dato' Setia Sultan Sallehuddin Kedah)

The rank is conferred on those who have contributed to the community and the State and have high positions and have high influence. The recipient of this award receives the title Dato' and his wife Datin.

The insignia is composed of a sash and a breast star. The sash is of green silk and has two large yellow stripes separated by a small green stripes on the middle and yellow-red stripes on both the edges. The breast star made of silver and consist five layers that plated with gold and coloured with enamel and consists twelve-pointed star with ted crown symbols.

=== Companion ===
- Companion of the Most Esteemed Order of Loyalty to Sultan Sallehuddin of Kedah (S.S.S.) (Malay: Seri Setia Sultan Sallehuddin)

The rank is conferred on those who have contributed to the community and the State. It does not carry any title.

The insignia is composed of a collar sash for male recipients and a breast knot for female recipients. The collar sash is of green silk and has two large yellow stripes separated by a small green stripes and each red stripes that inserted on outer edges on large yellow stripes on the middle and yellow stripes on both the edges. The star made of silver, gold-plated and colourful (enamel) green, yellow and red on certain parts and it consists twelve-pointed star with ted crown symbols.

=== Star ===
- Star of the Most Esteemed Order of Loyalty to Sultan Sallehuddin of Kedah (B.S.S.) (Malay: Bintang Setia Sultan Sallehuddin Kedah)

The rank is conferred on those who have contributed and have shown obedient and loyal service to the state and country. And this rank also conferred on those who serve in the State government or equivalent. It does not carry any title.

The insignia is composed of a badge hanging from a ribbon. The ribbon is of green silk and has four yellow stripes and a red stripes on middle and yellow stripes on both the edges. The star made of silver, gold-plated and colourful (enamel) green, yellow and red on certain parts and it consists twelve-pointed star with ted crown symbols.

== Recipients ==
Official source

=== Knight Grand Companion (S.S.S.K.) ===
- 2018: Sultan Sallehuddin, Sultan of Kedah (Founding Grand Master)
- 2018: Sultanah Maliha, Sultanah Kedah
- 2019: Tunku Shazuddin Ariff, Tunku Mahkota of Kedah
- 2023: Che Puan Nur Julie Ariff, Tunku Puan Mahkota of Kedah
- 2024: Anwar Ibrahim, 10th Prime Minister of Malaysia

=== Knight Commander (D.P.S.S.) ===
- 2019: Ahmad Kassim, 13th Speaker of the Kedah State Legislative Assembly
- 2019: Sheikh Fadzil Awang, State Mufti of Kedah
- 2019: Ammar Shaikh Mahmood Naim, State Secretary of Kedah
- 2019: Ku Nahar Ku Ibrahim, Dato' Lela Pahlawan of Kedah
- 2022: Mohd Omar Mohamed, Deputy Head of Ceremony of Kedah Royal Palace

=== Knight Companion (D.S.S.S.) ===
- 2019: Zamri Yusuf, Member of the Kedah State Executive Council
- 2019: Isahak Murat, Kedah State Financial Officer
- 2021: Juhari Bulat, 14th Speaker of the Kedah State Legislative Assembly
- 2021: Halimaton Shaadiah Saad, Member of the Kedah State Executive Council
- 2021: Mohd Fauzi Mustaffa, Kedah State Director of Land and Resources
- 2022: Azman Nasrudin, Member of the Kedah State Executive Council
- 2022: Wan Romani Wan Salim, Member of the Kedah State Executive Council
- 2023: M Noor Azman Taib, Secretary-General of Ministry Local Government Development
- 2023: Dr. Asmadi Mohamed Naim, Vice-Chancellor of Sultan Abdul Halim Mu'adzam Shah International Islamic University
- 2024: Mohd Azam Abd Samat, Member of the Kedah State Executive Council
- 2024: Dr. Azmil Khalili Khalid, chief executive officer of AFK Group
- 2024: Colonel (Ret.) Mohd Aros Othman
- 2025: Mohamad Yusoff Zakaria, Member of the Kedah State Executive Council

=== Companion (S.S.S.) ===
- 2018: Tengku Sarafudin Badlishah, Raja Muda of Kedah
- 2019: Azman Nasrudin, Member of the Kedah State Executive Council
- 2019: Salmee Said, Member of the Kedah State Executive Council
- 2019: Halimaton Shaadiah Saad, Member of the Kedah State Executive Council
- 2022: Mohd Firdaus Ahmad, Member of the Kedah State Executive Council
- 2023: Mohamad Yusoff Zakaria, Member of the Kedah State Executive Council
- 2023: Soo Beng Kiang, Malaysian badminton player
- 2025: Wong Chia Zhen, Member of the Kedah State Executive Council
- 2025: Dzowahir Ab Ghani, Member of the Kedah State Executive Council
- 2025: Azhar Ibrahim, Member of the Kedah State Legislative Assembly
