= Che Puan Besar Haminah =

Raja Permaisuri Agong from 2011 to 2016

Haminah همينة
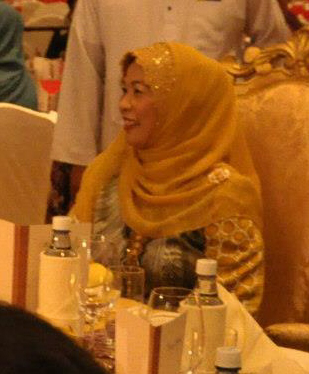

Queen consort of Malaysia
- Tenure: 13 December 2011 - 12 December 2016
- Installation: 11 April 2012
- Predecessor: Tuanku Nur Zahirah
- Successor: Tunku Azizah Aminah Maimunah Iskandariah

Sultanah of Kedah
- Tenure: 21 November 2003 - 11 September 2017
- Installation: 9 January 2004
- Predecessor: Sultanah Bahiyah
- Successor: Sultanah Maliha

Che Puan Besar of Kedah
- Tenure: 21 January 2018 - present
- Predecessor: Tunku Ampuan Asma (as Tunku Ampuan)
- Born: Haminah binti Hamidun; 15 July 1953 (age 73); Kampung Matang Jelutong, Bagan Serai, Perak, Malaya
- Spouse: Sultan Abdul Halim (m. 1975; died 2017)
Regnal name
- Sultanah Hajah Haminah (as Sultanah of Kedah); Tuanku Hajah Haminah (as Queen consort of Malaysia); Che Puan Besar Hajah Haminah (as Queen dowager of Kedah)
- Father: Haji Hamidun bin Taib
- Mother: Hajah Isma binti Mohamad
- Religion: Sunni Islam

Che Puan Besar Hajah Haminah binti Haji Hamidun (Jawi: چئ ڤوان بسر حاجة همينة بنت حميدون), formerly known as Sultanah Haminah (born Haminah binti Hamidun; 15 July 1953) is the former Sultanah of Kedah and the widow of Sultan Abdul Halim Mua'dzam Shah. Born as a commoner, she married Sultan Abdul Halim on 25 December 1975 as his second wife. She served as the 14th Raja Permaisuri Agong (Queen of Malaysia) from 2011 to 2016, during her husband's second term as Yang di-Pertuan Agong, the Malaysian federal head of state. After her husband's death in September 2017, his successor and her brother-in-law Sultan Sallehuddin, bestowed upon her the title Che Puan Besar of Kedah, roughly equivalent to the queen dowager.

== Early life ==
Born on 15 July 1953 in Kampung Matang Jelutong, Bagan Serai, Perak, she is the fourth of seven siblings to Haji Hamidun bin Taib and Hajah Isma binti Mohamad. Tuanku Hajah Haminah was educated at Matang Jelutong Primary School and later Bagan Serai English Secondary School.

== Interests ==
Tuanku Hajah Haminah is known to enjoy golf, tennis, badminton, lawn bowling and music. She has participated in various golf tournaments in Kedah and initiated amateur women's golf tournaments such as the Kedah International Red Tee Invitational, as well as being invited as the royal guest for the International Lawn Bowls Mahsuri Cup in Langkawi. She also served as the first Chancellor of Management and Science University from 2004 until 2019.

== Orders and recognitions ==
She has been awarded the following honours:

=== Honours of Kedah ===
- Member of the Royal Family Order of Kedah (DK) (9 January 2004)
- Member of the Halimi Family Order of Kedah (DKH) (15 July 2008)
- Member of the Supreme Order of Sri Mahawangsa (DMK) – Dato' Seri Utama (20 January 2017)

=== Honours of Malaysia ===
- Malaysia
  - Recipient of the Order of the Crown of the Realm (DMN) (26 January 2012)

=== Foreign honours ===
- Japan
  - Grand Cordon (Paulownia) of the Order of the Precious Crown (6 February 2013)
- Thailand
  - Dame Grand Cross (First Class) of the Order of Chula Chom Klao (2 September 2013)

=== Places named after her ===
Several places have been named after her, including:

- Sultanah Haminah Mosque in Pendang, Kedah
- Taman Tuanku Haminah, a residential area in Sungai Petani, Kedah
- Pusat Perdagangan Tuanku Haminah, a trade centre in Alor Setar, Kedah
- Dewan Tuanku Permaisuri Hajah Haminah, a ceremony hall at the Universiti Islam Antarabangsa Sultan Abdul Halim Mu'adzam Shah in Kuala Ketil, Kedah
- Yayasan Anak-anak Yatim Sultanah Haminah, an orphanage foundation in Kedah

Malaysian royalty
Preceded by Tuanku Bahiyah	Sultanah of Kedah; 2003–2017	Succeeded by Sultanah Maliha
Preceded by Tuanku Nur Zahirah (Sultanah of Terengganu)	Raja Permaisuri Agong (Queen of Malaysia); 2011–2016	Vacant Title next held by Tunku Azizah Aminah Maimunah Iskandariah (Tengku Ampuan of Pahang)
