= Tunku Abdul Malik =

- Raja Muda of Kedah

Raja Muda of Kedah
- Tenure: 1981–2015
- Predecessor: Tunku Abdul Halim
- Successor: Tunku Mahmud Sallehuddin
- Born: 24 September 1929; Istana Anak Bukit, Kedah, British Malaya
- Died: 29 November 2015 (aged 86); Hospital Sultanah Bahiyah, Alor Setar, Kedah, Malaysia
- Burial: Langgar Royal Mausoleum
- Spouse: Tengku Raudzah binti Al-Marhum Sultan Hisamuddin Alam Shah (m. 1956; died 2015)
- House: Mahawangsa
- Father: Sultan Badlishah
- Mother: Tunku Sofia binti Tunku Mahmud
- Religion: Sunni Islam

Tunku Abdul Malik ibni Almarhum Sultan Badlishah (24 September 1929 – 29 November 2015) was the heir presumptive (Note: Although he was sometimes called heir apparent due to him being invested Raja Muda, this was not technically true since he could still have been displaced in the line of succession by a son born to the then Sultan, however implausible that was.) to the throne of Kedah. He was the son of Sultan Badlishah and the brother of the late ruler, Sultan Abdul Halim. He served as Regent of Kedah from 1970 to 1975.

== Biography ==
Tunku Abdul Malik was born on 24 September 1929 at Istana Anak Bukit, Anak Bukit, as the second son of Tunku Badlishah and Tunku Sofiah Tunku Mahmud to survive infancy. Tunku Badlishah was the seventh son of Sultan Abdul Hamid Halim (also the father of Tunku Abdul Rahman, first Prime Minister of Malaysia). His father was appointed Raja Muda (Crown Prince) of Kedah in 1935 and became sultan in 1943.

He was educated at Titi Gajah Malay School and Sultan Abdul Hamid College, and attended Wadham College, Oxford.

His elder brother, Tunku Abdul Halim, succeeded to the throne in 1958 upon the death of their father. Tunku Abdul Malik became Regent of Kedah from 1970 to 1975 during Sultan Abdul Halim's first reign as Yang di-Pertuan Agong. Because Sultan Abdul Halim had no sons, Tunku Abdul Malik was designated as heir in 1981, and was invested as Raja Muda.

== Marriage ==
Tunku Abdul Malik married Tengku Raudzah binti Almarhum Sultan Hisamuddin Alam Shah (29 September 1929 – 21 September 2015), the daughter of Sultan Hisamuddin Alam Shah of Selangor, on 16 July 1956 at Istana Bukit Kota, Alor Setar. After his appointment as Raja Muda in 1981, Tengku Raudzah became the Raja Puan Muda. They had been married for 59 years until Tengku Raudzah's death, aged 85.

== Death ==
Tunku Abdul Malik died at 1:00 am, 29 November 2015, at the age of 86, in Sultanah Bahiyah Hospital, Alor Star due to old age, a day after his brother, Sultan Abdul Halim's 88th birthday who at that time was the 14th Yang di-Pertuan Agong. His body was then laid to rest at Kedah Royal Mausoleum in Langgar.

== Honours ==
He was awarded the following decorations:

=== Honours of Kedah ===
- Member of the Royal Family Order of Kedah (DK, 21 February 1968)
- Member of the Halimi Family Order of Kedah (DKH, 22 January 1976)
- Member of the Supreme Order of Sri Mahawangsa (DMK, 12 December 2011)
- Knight Grand Commander of the Order of the Crown of Kedah (SPMK) – Dato' Seri (29 February 1964)
- Sultan Badlishah Medal for Faithful and Loyal Service (PSB)

=== Honours of Malaysia ===
- Johor
  - Knight Grand Commander of the Order of the Crown of Johor (SPMJ) – Dato'
  - Sultan Ismail Coronation Medal of Johor (1960)
- Perak
  - Grand Knight of the Order of Cura Si Manja Kini (SPCM) – Dato' Seri (10 April 1986)
- Sarawak
  - Knight Commander of the Order of the Star of Hornbill Sarawak (DA) – Datuk Amar
- Selangor
  - Second Class of the Royal Family Order of Selangor (DK II, 9 March 1989)
- Terengganu
  - Member second class of the Family Order of Terengganu (DK II, 29 April 1985)
