= State of Kedah Star of Gallantry =

State of Kedah Star of Gallantry Bintang Perkasa Negeri Kedah

Awarded by Sultan of Kedah
- Type: Military decoration
- Status: Currently constituted
- Sovereign: Sallehuddin of Kedah
- Grades: Star (BPK)

Precedence
- Next (higher): Supreme Order of Sri Mahawangsa
- Next (lower): Order of Loyalty to Sultan Sallehuddin of Kedah; Order of Loyalty to Sultan Abdul Halim Mu'adzam Shah (dormant)
- Ribbon bar of the order

The State of Kedah Star of Gallantry (Bahasa Melayu: Bintang Perkasa Negeri Kedah) is an honorific military decoration of the Sultanate of Kedah

== History ==
It was founded by Sultan Badlishah of Kedah on 30 October 1952.

== Recipients ==
It is as a reward for conspicuous acts of gallantry by the military, police or civilians, but of a standard less than the Star of Valour (B.K.K). This Medal may be awarded posthumously.

== Classes ==
It is awarded in one class:

- Silver Star - Post-nominal letters : BPK

== Insignia ==
It is composed of a six-pointed silver star hung from a dark blue ribbon with 2 white stripes. Photos : 1
