= Sultanah Maliha =

Sultanah of Kedah since 2017

Maliha مليحة

Sultanah of Kedah
- Tenure: 12 September 2017 – present
- Proclamation: 30 April 2018
- Predecessor: Sultanah Haminah
- Born: Tengku Maliha binti Tengku Ariff; 13 April 1949 (age 77); Kota Bharu, Kelantan, Federation of Malaya (now Malaysia)
- Spouse: Al-Aminul Karim Sultan Sallehuddin (m. 1965)
- Issue: Tengku Sarafudin Badlishah, Crown Prince of Kedah; Tunku Shazuddin Ariff, Deputy Crown Prince of Kedah
Regnal name
- Sultanah Maliha binti Almarhum Tengku Ariff
- House: Long Yunus (by birth); Mahawangsa (by marriage)
- Father: Tengku Sri Jaya Raja Tengku Ariff bin Tengku Long Abdul Rahman
- Mother: Cik Puan Sri Jaya Raja Cik Puan Rokiah binti Sulaiman
- Religion: Sunni Islam

Sultanah Maliha binti Almarhum Tengku Ariff (Jawi: سلطانة مليحة بنت المرحوم تڠكو عارف; born 13 April 1949) is the current Sultanah of Malaysian State of Kedah. She was proclaimed as the Sultanah of Kedah on 30 April 2018 in a royal ceremony after her husband, Sultan Sallehuddin was made Sultan of Kedah. She is the mother to Tengku Sarafudin Badlishah and Tunku Shazuddin Ariff.

== Biography ==
Born as Tengku Maliha, she is the third child of seven siblings to Tengku Sri Jaya Raja Tengku Ariff bin Tengku Long Abdul Rahman and Cik Puan Sri Jaya Raja Cik Puan Rokiah binti Sulaiman. She is a member of Kelantanese Royal Family with Raja Perempuan Zainab II, the consort of Sultan Yahya Petra as her grand aunt.

She received her early education at St. Mary Primary School, Kuala Lumpur and then at Assunta Satu Primary School before she went to Assunta Secondary School, Petaling Jaya. At that time, her father was serving with KLM, a flag carrier airline company of the Netherlands. In 1960, she with her family returned to Kota Bharu, Kelantan after her father served as the aide-de-camp to Sultan Yahya Petra, the then Sultan of Kelantan.

After returning to Kota Bharu, she continued her studies at Raja Perempuan Zainab (I) Secondary School and wsas very active in school sports activities, especially in hockey. She also took part in her school's debate club and once represented her school in a state's English debate competition.

== Interest ==
Sultanah Maliha cares and is involved in the education development of the people, especially in Kedah and is keen on the development of the English Language. As such, she was appointed as the royal patron of the English Literacy and Computer Programme (COMEL), managed by State Government Education Department and National University of Malaysia. Sultanah Maliha is also a cat lover and passionate about cooking, especially Malaysian East Coast cuisines.

== Raja Puan Muda of Kedah ==
She was proclaimed as the Raja Puan Muda of Kedah (literally the Crown Princess) replaced Tengku Raudzah after her husband was proclaimed as the Raja Muda of Kedah (Crown Prince of Kedah) on 15 December 2016. Her husband replaced Tunku Abdul Malik, who died of natural causes on 29 November 2015 at Sultanah Bahiyah Hospital in Alor Setar.

== Sultanah of Kedah ==
Maliha was made the Sultanah of Kedah after her husband was proclaimed as the new Sultan of Kedah following the death of her brother-in-law, Sultan Abdul Halim in September 2017. Her official proclamation as Sultanah was held on 30 April 2018 with full royal ceremony at Anak Bukit Palace, Alor Setar. The ceremony was attended by members of the Kedah and Kelantan Royal Families, Kedahan statesmen, the then Chief Minister of Kedah and wife, some members of Kedah State Executive Council with their spouses. The ceremony began at 11 in the morning upon the arrival of Sultan Sallehuddin, accompanied by Sultanah Maliha to the throne hall (known as the Bailarong Seri). After the arrival, the letter of her procalamaiton as Sultanah was read by the then Chief Minister of Kedah, Ahmad Bashah Md Hanipah in front of the Sultan. Sultanah Maliha then stood and kissed her husband's hand as symbol of the junjung duli (respect) ceremony. Then, the ceremony continued with a 21 canon salute, accompanied by royal nobat (traditional music). Sultanah Maliha was also bestowed with the Darjah Seri Setia Sultan Sallehuddin (SSSK) by the Sultan. The ceremony ended with the Sultan and Sultanah along with royal family members leaving the throne hall.

Like many spouses of heads of state, as the Sultanah of Kedah, she has no stipulated role or duties in the Kedah State Constitution. However, she accompanies the Sultan of kedah to official functions and state visits, as well as hosting visiting heads of state and their spouses. For example, she accompanied her husband to the Installation of Yang di-Pertuan Agong XVI at the National Palace on 30 July 2019.

== Honours ==
=== Awards and Recognitions ===
- Recipient of the Royal Family Order of Kedah (DK) (21 January 2018)
- Grand Commander of the Order of Loyalty to Sultan Sallehuddin of Kedah (SSSK) – Dato' Seri Diraja (30 April 2018)
- Grand Commander of the Order of Loyalty to Sultan Abdul Halim Mu'adzam Shah (SHMS) – Dato' Seri Diraja (15 January 2017)
- Knight Grand Companion of the Order of Loyalty to the Royal House of Kedah (SSDK) – Dato' Seri (12 December 2011)
- Knight Companion of the Order of Loyalty to the Royal House of Kedah (DSDK) – Dato' (2001)
- Companion of the Order of Loyalty to the Royal House of Kedah (SDK)
- Recipient of the Silver Jubilee Medal (15 July 1983)
- Recipient of the Golden Jubilee Medal (15 July 2008)
- Recipient of the Sultan Sallehuddin Installation Medal (22 October 2018)

=== Places named after her ===
- Sultanah Maliha Hospital, Langkawi, Kedah

== Issue ==
Name	Born	Marriage		Children
Name	Born	Date	Spouse	Children
Tengku Sarafudin Badlishah	2 March 1967	27 February 2003	Che Puan Muda Zaheeda	Tunku Zara Bahiyah
Tengku Sarafudin Badlishah	2 March 1967	27 February 2003	Che Puan Muda Zaheeda	Tunku Sulaiman Badlishah
Tunku Shazuddin Ariff	27 April 1970	26 November 2022	Che Puan Nur Julie Ariff	

== See also ==
- Sultanate of Kedah
- List of Sultanahs of Kedah
- Chief Ministers of Kedah
