= Kedah Supreme Order of Merit =

Honorific order of the Sultanate of Kedah

Kedah Supreme Order of Merit Darjah Utama Untok Jasa Kedah

Awarded by Sultan of Kedah
- Type: Order
- Status: Currently constituted
- Sovereign: Sallehuddin of Kedah
- Grades: DUK

Precedence
- Next (higher): Halimi Family Order of Kedah
- Next (lower): Supreme Order of Sri Mahawangsa
- Ribbon bar of the order

The Kedah Supreme Order of Merit (Bahasa Melayu: Darjah Utama Untok Jasa Kedah) is an honorific order of the Sultanate of Kedah

== History ==
It was founded by Sultan Badlishah of Kedah on 17 November 1953 (or 30 October 1952).

== Award conditions ==
This is the highest Order to be conferred on those who have performed meritorious deeds with full responsibility to the nation for a stated number of years. It is conferred on those of high position and wide influence. This Order may be held by only three living persons at one time, and it is seldom conferred.

== Classes ==
It is awarded in one class:

- Darjah Utama Untok Jasa Kedah – DUK

== Recipients ==
- 1958: Tunku Abdul Rahman
- 1988: Mahathir Mohamad
- 2006: Abdullah Ahmad Badawi
- Abdul Razak Hussein

== Insignia ==
The Order consists of a chain. Photos : Kedah
