= Halimi Family Order of Kedah =

Halimi Family Order of Kedah Darjah Kerabat Halimi Yang Amat Mulia Kedah

Awarded by Sultan of Kedah
- Type: Order
- Awarded for: Members of the Royal Family only
- Status: Currently constituted
- Sovereign: Sallehuddin of Kedah
- Grades: Member (DKH)

Precedence
- Next (higher): Royal Family Order of Kedah
- Next (lower): Kedah Supreme Order of Merit
- Ribbon bar of the order

The Most Illustrious Halimi Family Order of Kedah (Bahasa Melayu: Darjah Kerabat Halimi Yang Amat Mulia Kedah) is an honorific order of the Sultanate of Kedah

== History ==
It was founded by Sultan 'Abdu'l Halim Mu'azzam Shah of Kedah in January 1973.

== Award conditions ==
The Darjah Kerabat Halimi is conferred at the express wish of the Sultan and is reserved for members of the Royal Family only.

== Classes ==
It is awarded in one class:

- Darjah Kerabat Halimi or member - DKH

== Insignia ==
The men's insignia consist of a sash, a neck chain and a star (Photo).
The women's insignia consist of a chest knot, a neck chain and a star (Photo).

== Notable recipients ==
Sultan Abdul Halim of Kedah:

- Founding Grand Master and Member of the Halimi Family Order of Kedah (DKH, since January 1973)

Members of the Royal Family of Kedah :

- Member of the Halimi Family Order of Kedah :
  - late Tuanku Bahiyah DMN SMN DK DKH SPMK (1st wife of the Sultan Abdul Halim) (DKH, 1.1976)
  - Sultanah Haminah of Kedah DMN DK DKH (current wife of the Sultan) (DKH, 16.7.2008)
  - Princess Intan Safinaz PSM DKH SSDK SHMS JP PAT (Sultan Abdul Halim of Kedah and Tuanku Bahiyah's daughter and Mbr of the Regency Council 2011) (DKH, 16.7.2008)
  - Tunku Abdul Malik, Raja Muda DK DKH DMK SPMK PSB (1st younger brother of the Sultan and heir prince of Kedah) (DKH, 22.2.1976)
  - Tunku Annuar, Tunku Bendahara PSM DKH DMK SPMK SSDK PSB (2nd younger brother of the Sultan and head of the Regency Council 2011) (DKH, 16.7.2008)

=== Lists of recipients ===
- List of honours of the Kedah Royal Family by country
- List of Honours of Kedah awarded to Heads of State and Royals
- Category: Members of the Halimi Family Order of Kedah
