= Tengku Sarafudin Badlishah =

Crown Prince of Kedah (born 1967)

Tengku Sarafudin Badlishah تڠكو شرف الدين بدلي شاه
- Raja Muda of Kedah
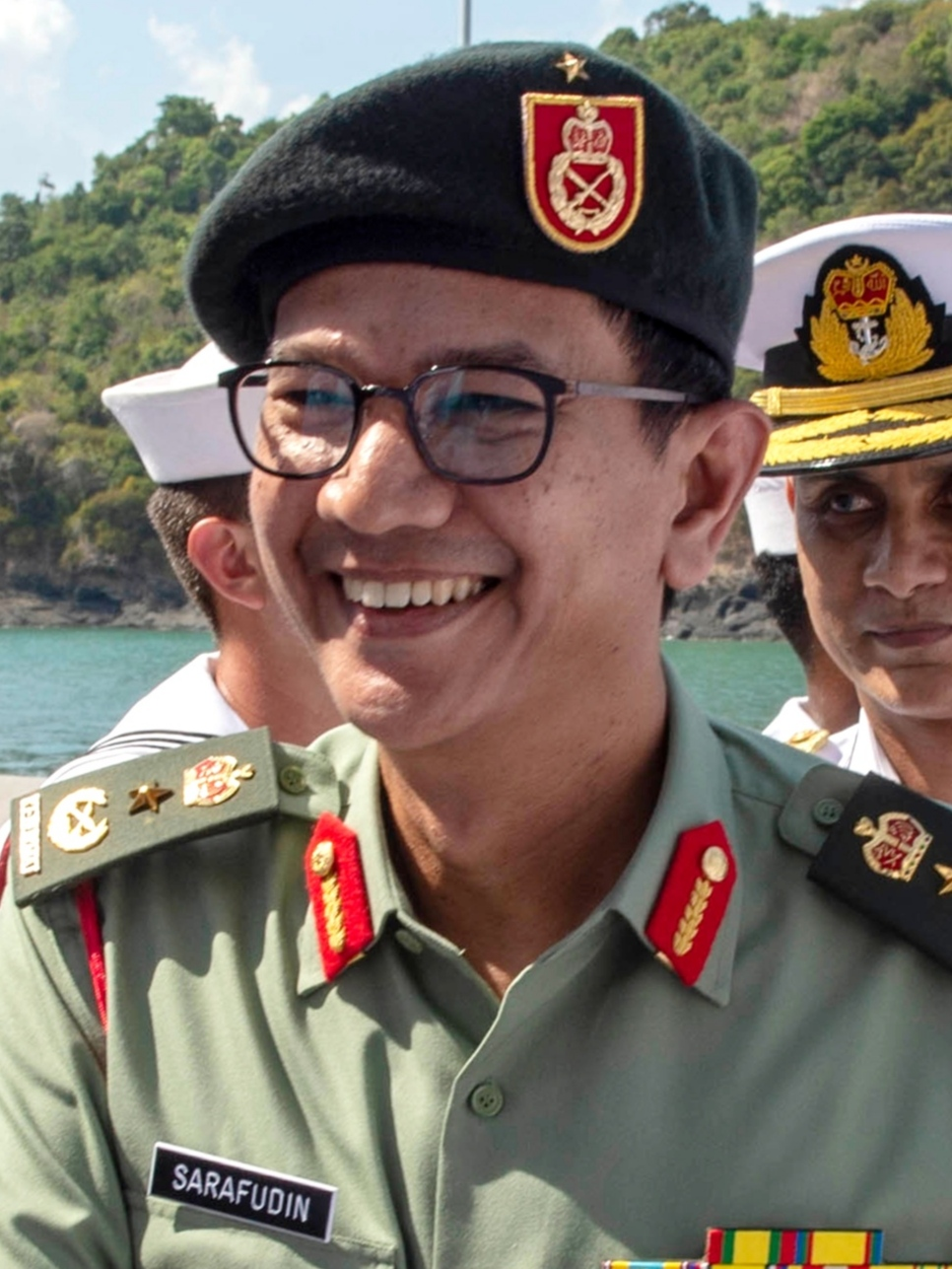
- Tengku Sarafudin Badlishah in 2019

Crown Prince of Kedah
- Proclaimed: 26 November 2017 – present
- Predecessor: Tunku Mahmud Sallehuddin
- Born: Tengku Sarafudin Badlishah ibni Tunku Mahmud Sallehuddin; 2 March 1967 (age 59); Alor Setar, Kedah, Malaysia
- Spouse: Che Puan Muda Zaheeda (m. 2003)
- Issue: Tunku Zara Bahiyah; Tunku Sulaiman Badlishah
Names
- Tengku Sarafudin Badlishah ibni Al-Aminul Karim Sultan Sallehuddin
- House: Mahawangsa
- Father: Al-Aminul Karim Sultan Sallehuddin
- Mother: Sultanah Maliha
- Religion: Sunni Islam

Tengku Sarafudin Badlishah ibni Al-Aminul Karim Sultan Sallehuddin (Jawi: تڠكو شرف الدين بدلي شاه ابن الأمين الكريم سلطان صالح الدين; born 2 March 1967) is the current Raja Muda (Crown Prince) of Kedah. He was proclaimed as Raja Muda of Kedah on 26 November 2017, upon the accession of his father, Al-Aminul Karim Sultan Sallehuddin ibni Almarhum Sultan Badlishah as the 29th sultan of Kedah.

== Biography ==
Tengku Sarafudin Badlishah was born on 2 March 1967 in Alor Setar, Kedah. He is the eldest son of Sultan Sallehuddin of Kedah and Sultanah Maliha. Tengku Sarafudin has one younger brother, Tunku Shazuddin Ariff, who is the current Tunku Mahkota (Deputy Crown Prince) of Kedah.

Tengku Sarafuddin attended the Royal Military College at Sungei Besi, Malaysia and continued with legal studies at Holborn College London. He graduated from Brunel University London with a Bachelor of Laws (Hons) degree in 1990. He received his Barrister at Law (Inner Temple) UK appointment and was admitted in the High Court of Malaya as an advocate and solicitor in 1994.

== Tunku Laksamana of Kedah ==
Tengku Sarafudin had previously become the Tunku Laksamana of Kedah before being proclaimed as the Raja Muda of Kedah. He was succeeded as Tunku Laksamana by his younger brother, Tunku Shazudin Ariff.

== Raja Muda of Kedah ==
Tengku Sarafudin was proclaimed as Raja Muda of Kedah on 26 November 2017, upon the accession of his father as the 29th sultan of Kedah.

As Raja Muda, Tengku Sarafudin holds a number of important positions including as chancellor of the Management and Science University and president of the Kedah Islamic Religious Council.

== Personal life ==
Tengku Sarafudin is married to a commoner from Perak, Che Puan Muda Zaheeda Mohamad Ariff (born 19 October 1971) who became the Raja Puan Muda (Crown Princess) of Kedah in 2017. The couple have two children:

- Tunku Zara Bahiyah (born 11 April 2004).
- Tunku Sulaiman Badlishah (born 18 December 2007).

== Issue ==
Name	Birth	Place birth	Age
Her Highness (Yang Teramat Mulia); Tunku Zara Bahiyah Binti Tengku Sarafudin Badlishah	11 April 2004	Kedah	22 years, 6 months and 28 days
His Highness (Yang Teramat Mulia); Tunku Sulaiman Badlishah Bin Tengku Sarafudin Badlishah	18 December 2007	Kedah	18 years, 10 months and 21 days

== Honours ==
- Member of the Royal Family Order of Kedah (DK) (19 June 2022)
- Member of the Supreme Order of Sri Mahawangsa (DMK) – Dato' Seri Utama (26 November 2017)
- Knight Companion of the Order of Loyalty to the Royal House of Kedah (DSDK) – Dato' (21 January 2007)
- Companion of the Order of Loyalty to Sultan Sallehuddin of Kedah (SSS)
- Recipient of the Golden Jubilee Medal (15 July 2008)
- Recipient of the Sultan Sallehuddin Installation Medal (22 October 2018)

Tengku Sarafudin Badlishah House of Kedah
Regnal titles
Preceded by Tunku Mahmud Sallehuddin	Raja Muda of Kedah; 2017–present	Incumbent
