= Supreme Order of Sri Mahawangsa =

Honorific order of the Sultanate of Kedah

Supreme Order of Sri Mahawangsa Darjah Utama Sri Mahawangsa Yang Amat di-Hormati

Awarded by Sultan of Kedah
- Type: Order
- Royal house: Sri Mahawangsa
- Status: Currently constituted
- Founder: Abdul Halim
- Grand Master: Sallehuddin of Kedah
- Grades: Member
- Post-nominals: D.M.K.

Precedence
- Next (higher): Kedah Supreme Order of Merit
- Next (lower): State of Kedah Star of Gallantry
- Ribbon bar of the order

The Most Esteemed Supreme Order of Sri Mahawangsa Malay: Darjah Utama Sri Mahawangsa Yang Amat di-Hormati is an order of chivalry of the state of Kedah which was established in 2005 by Sultan Abdul Halim of Kedah.

== History ==
It was founded by Sultan Abdul Halim of Kedah in 2005.

== Classes ==
The Supreme Order of Sri Mahawangsa is conferred in the single class of Member. The recipients are entitled to the post-nominal letters of D.M.K. The recipients also bear the honorific title of Dato' Seri Utama. The wives of the male recipients are titled as To’ Puan Seri Utama, while husbands of female recipients are not entitled to any title.

== Grand Masters ==
- 2005 – 2017: Sultan Abdul Halim of Kedah (Founder)
- 2017 – present: Sultan Sallehuddin of Kedah

== Recipients ==
- 2005: Syed Razak Syed Zain Barakbah
- 2007: Abdul Rahman Abbas
- 2008: Najib Razak
- 2008: Ahmadshah Abdullah
- 2011: Tunku Abdul Malik
- 2011: Tunku Annuar
- 2017: Sultanah Haminah Hamidun
- 2017: Tengku Muhammad Fa-iz Petra
- 2017: Tengku Sarafudin Badlishah
- 2019: Mukhriz Mahathir

== See also ==
- List of honours of the Kedah Royal Family by country
