= Royal Family Order of Kedah =

Honorific order of the Sultanate of Kedah

The Most Illustrious Royal Family Order of Kedah Darjah Kerabat Yang Amat Mulia Kedah

Awarded by Sultan of Kedah
- Type: Dynastic order
- Royal house: Sri Mahawangsa
- Status: Currently constituted
- Founder: Abdul Halim
- Grand Master: Sallehuddin of Kedah
- Grades: Member
- Post-nominals: D.K.

Precedence
- Next (higher): State of Kedah Star of Valour
- Next (lower): Halimi Family Order of Kedah
- Ribbon bar of the order

The Most Illustrious Royal Family Order of Kedah (Malay: Darjah Kerabat Yang Amat Mulia Kedah) is the highest dynastic order of the House of Sri Mahawangsa and the second highest chivalric order of the state of Kedah ranking immediately after the State of Kedah Star of Valour. The order was constituted by Sultan Abdul Halim of Kedah on 21 February 1964.

== History ==
The Royal Family Order of Kedah was founded by Sultan Abdul Halim of Kedah on 21 February 1964. The order is conferred on the rulers of the Malay states, their consorts, foreign heads and their consorts, senior members of the royal families and eminent individuals for their most distinguished services to Kedah and Malaysia.

== Grade and insignia ==
=== Grade ===
The Royal Family Order of Kedah is conferred in a single class of Member. The recipients bear the post-nominal letters of D.K. The recipients do not bear any honorific title.

=== Insignia ===
The insignia of the order comprises a collar, a sash, a star and the badge. The sash of the order is yellow with red and green side stripes and is worn from the left shoulder to the right hip

== Recipients ==
- 1964: Sultan Abdul Halim of Kedah (Founding Grand Master)
- 1964: Sultanah Bahiyah
- 1964: Tunku Puan Besar Kurshiah
- 1968: Tunku Abdul Malik
- 1969: Sultan Yahya Petra of Kelantan
- 1969: Sultan Abu Bakar of Pahang
- 1978: Sultan Salahuddin of Selangor
- 1980: Raja Putra of Perlis
- 1982: Yang di-Pertuan Besar Ja'afar of Negeri Sembilan
- 1982: Tunku Ampuan Najihah
- 1982: Tunku Abdul Rahman
- 1985: Sultan Mahmud of Terengganu
- 1985: Sultan Ismail Petra of Kelantan
- 1985: Raja Perempuan Tengku Anis
- 1985: Sultan Iskandar of Johor
- 1985: Tunku Puan Zanariah
- 1986: Sultan Azlan Shah of Perak
- 1987: Sultan Ahmad Shah of Pahang
- 2002: Sultan Mizan Zainal Abidin of Terengganu
- 2002: Sultanah Nur Zahirah
- 2002: Raja Sirajuddin of Perlis
- 2003: Sultan Sharafuddin of Selangor
- 2003: Tun Dr. Mahathir Mohamad
- 2004: Sultanah Haminah
- 2010: Yamtuan Besar Muhriz of Negeri Sembilan
- 2012: Sultan Muhammad V of Kelantan
- 2017: Sultan Sallehuddin of Kedah (Grand Master, since 2017)
- 2018: Sultan Ibrahim Iskandar of Johor
- 2018: Sultanah Maliha
- 2019: Sultan Abdullah of Pahang
- 2022: Tengku Sarafudin Badlishah

== See also ==
- List of honours of the Kedah Royal Family by country
