= Order of Loyalty to the Royal House of Kedah =

Honorific order of the Sultanate of Kedah

Order of Loyalty to the Royal House of Kedah Darjah Yang Mulia Setia Diraja Kedah

Awarded by Sultan of Kedah
- Type: Order
- Status: Currently constituted
- Sovereign: Sallehuddin of Kedah
- Grades: Grand Commander (SSDK); Commander (DSDK); Companion (SDK)
- Post-nominals: S.S.D.K.; D.S.D.K.; S.D.K.

Statistics
- Total inductees: SSDK - maximum 25 people DSDK - maximum 150 people

Precedence
- Next (higher): Exalted Order of the Crown of Kedah
- Next (lower): State of Kedah Gallantry Medal
- (SSDK) (DSDK) (SDK); Ribbon bar of the order

The Illustrious Order of Loyalty to the Royal House of Kedah (Bahasa Melayu: Darjah Yang Mulia Setia Diraja Kedah) is an honorific order of the Sultanate of Kedah.

== History ==
It was founded by Sultan Abdul Halim of Kedah on 21 September 1973.

== Classes ==
It is awarded in three classes:

- Grand Commander - (SSDK)
  - The male titular has right to the prefix Dato' Seri and his wife, to the prefix Datin Seri
- Commander - (DSDK)
  - The male titular has right to the prefix Dato' and his wife, to the prefix Datin
- Companion - (SDK)

Ribbon
SSDK	DSDK	SDK
Former Ribbon
	DSDK	.

== Award conditions ==
- Knight Grand Companion or Dato' Sri Setia di-Raja Kedah - SSDK
  This Order is conferred on those of high position who are well known for their excellence in the performance of their duties to the State and Nation, in whatever field. This Order may be held by only 25 persons at one time, and recipients are honoured with the title, "Dato' Seri".
- Knight Companion or Dato' Setia di-Raja Kedah - DSDK
  This Order ranks second to the Darjah Yang Mulia Seri Setia. It is conferred on those in high positions, exercising great influence, who have performed, with great responsibility, much excellent service to the State and Nation. The conferment of this Order is limited to 150 persons only. For government servants, this Order is only given to those in the Management and Professional level or those of similar status. -

== Insignia ==
- Grand Commander or Dato' Sri Setia di-Raja Kedah - SSDK . Photos : Men & Women (a Princess of Kedah)
  The insignia is composed of a collar, a breast star and a badge hanging from a sash.
- Commander or Dato' Setia di-Raja Kedah - DSDK. Photos : Men - 2005 & 2011 - Women (RA)
  The current insignia is composed of a badge hanging from a sash with a different pattern than the SSDK and a breast star
  The former insignia of a male titular was apparently composed of a badge hanging from a collar sash similar to the SDK and a breast star (Men (Kedah)).
- Companion or Setia - SDK. Photos : Men - titular 2010 & Women
  The current insignia of a male titular is composed of a badge hanging from a collar sash (without breast star)
  The current insignia of a female titular is composed of a badge hanging from a breast knot.

== Recipients ==
=== Grand Commander (S.S.D.K.) ===
- 1976: Syed Ahmad Shahabuddin
- 1976: Tunku Raudzah
- 1977: Mahathir Mohamad
- 1983: Tunku Abdul Rahman
- 1983: Siti Hasmah Mohamad Ali
- 1987: Tunku Sallehuddin
- 1987: Tunku Soraya
- 1988: Tunku Puteri Intan Safinaz
- 1991: Abdul Taib Mahmud
- 2000: Syed Razak Syed Zain Barakbah
- 2002: Mohamed Zahir Ismail
- 2003: Tunku Hamidah
- 2004: Tunku Abdul Hamid Thani, Tunku Laksamana
- 2004: Ahmad Fairuz Abdul Halim
- 2006: Mahdzir Khalid
- 2008: Syed Mokhtar Albukhary
- 2008: Zaki Azmi
- 2008: Ismail Omar
- 2010: Jamil Khir Baharom
- 2011: Noor Suzanna
- 2011: Tunku Hosnah
- 2011: Tengku Maliha, Tunku Puan Temenggong
- 2012: Chor Chee Heung
- 2014: Ahmad Bashah Md Hanipah
- 2014: Moh Puat Moh Ali
- 2014: Syed Ismail Syed Azizan
- 2015: Ali Hamsa
- 2017: Haji Bakar Din
- 2021: Syed Azman Syed Ibrahim
- 2022: Azmin Ali
- 2023: Norizan Khazali
- Unknown: Tunku Annuar
- Unknown: Abdul Rahman Ya'kub

=== Knight Companion (D.S.D.K.) ===
- 1982: Tunku Sallehuddin
- 1985: Razali Ismail
- 1986: Abdul Kadir Sheikh Fadzir
- 1987: Abu Bakar Taib
- 1987: Abdul Hamid Othman
- 1987: Ahmad Kamil Jaafar
- 1990: Ahmad Fairuz Abdul Halim
- 1991: Tunku Abdul Hamid Thani
- 1992: Zaki Azmi
- 1997: Badruddin Amiruldin
- 1997: Abdul Aziz Shamsuddin
- 1997: Tengku Adnan Tengku Mansor
- 1998: Chor Chee Heung
- 1998: Fadzil Noor
- 1999: Azizan Ariffin
- 2000: Syed Arabi Idid
- 2001: Mokhzani Mahathir
- 2002: Ahmad Lebai Sudin
- 2002: Ahmad Bashah Md Hanipah
- 2004: Zulkifeli Mohd Zin
- 2006: Azimi Daim
- 2006: Mashitah Ibrahim
- 2006: Mohd Johari Baharum
- 2006: Ismail Omar
- 2006: Nawawi Ahmad
- 2007: Tengku Sarafudin Badlishah
- 2007: Tunku Kamaliah
- 2007: Tunku Nafisah
- 2008: Tunku Bisharah
- 2008: Tunku Badriat
- 2008: Phahrolrazi Mohd Zawawi
- 2008: Ahmad Fuad Ismail
- 2008: Zabidi Md Zain
- 2008: Ahmad Zaini Japar
- 2008: Anthony Firdauz Bujang
- 2008: Ariffin Man
- 2008: Asmabi Mohamad
- 2008: Bakri Ali Mahamad
- 2008: Boey Chin Gan
- 2008: Ramlan Ibrahim
- 2008: Noor Rashid Ibrahim
- 2008: Raja Mohamed Affandi
- 2008: Mohamed Taulan Mat Rasul
- 2009: Mahfuz Omar
- 2009: Johari Abdul
- 2009: Amiruddin Hamzah
- 2010: Mohd Hayati Othman
- 2010: Rashid Din
- 2011: Taib Azamudden Md Taib
- 2012: Saifuddin Nasution Ismail
- 2012: Mohamad Ariff Md Yusof
- 2013: Ahmad Kassim
- 2013: Asma Ismail
- 2013: Ismail Salleh
- 2016: Ahmad Badri Mohd Zahir
- 2021: Ahmad Yahaya
- 2022: Mohd Isa Shafie
- 2024: Mohd Fo'ad Sakdan
- Unknown: Mohamed Zahir Ismail

=== Lists of recipients ===
- List of honours of the Kedah Royal Family by country
- List of Honours of Kedah awarded to Heads of State and Royals
