= State of Kedah Star of Valour =

Supreme honorific war decoration of the Sultanate of Kedah

State of Kedah Star of Valour Bintang Keberanian Negeri Kedah

Awarded by Sultan of Kedah
- Type: Military decoration
- Status: Currently constituted
- Sovereign: Sallehuddin of Kedah
- Grades: Star (BKK)

Precedence
- Next (higher): None
- Next (lower): Royal Family Order of Kedah
- Ribbon bar of the order

The State of Kedah Star of Valour (Bahasa Melayu: Bintang Keberanian Negeri Kedah) is the supreme honorific war decoration of the Sultanate of Kedah.

It is the Kedahan equivalent of the Victoria Cross (military recipients) and the George Cross (civilian recipients).

== History ==
It was founded by Sultan Badlishah of Kedah on 30 October 1952.

== Recipients ==
It is as a reward for acts of supreme valour performed by the military or civilians (in uniformed organizations or not) in circumstances of extreme danger during peacetime or war. There should be at least two witnesses to a candidate's deed. This award may be conferred posthumously.

== Classes ==
It is awarded in one class:

- Star - Post-nominal letters : BKK

== Insignia ==
It composed of a bronze star hung from a dark red ribbon with a central dark blue stripe. Photos : 1 & 2
