= Sallehuddin of Kedah =

Sultan of Kedah since 2017

Sallehuddin صالح الدين
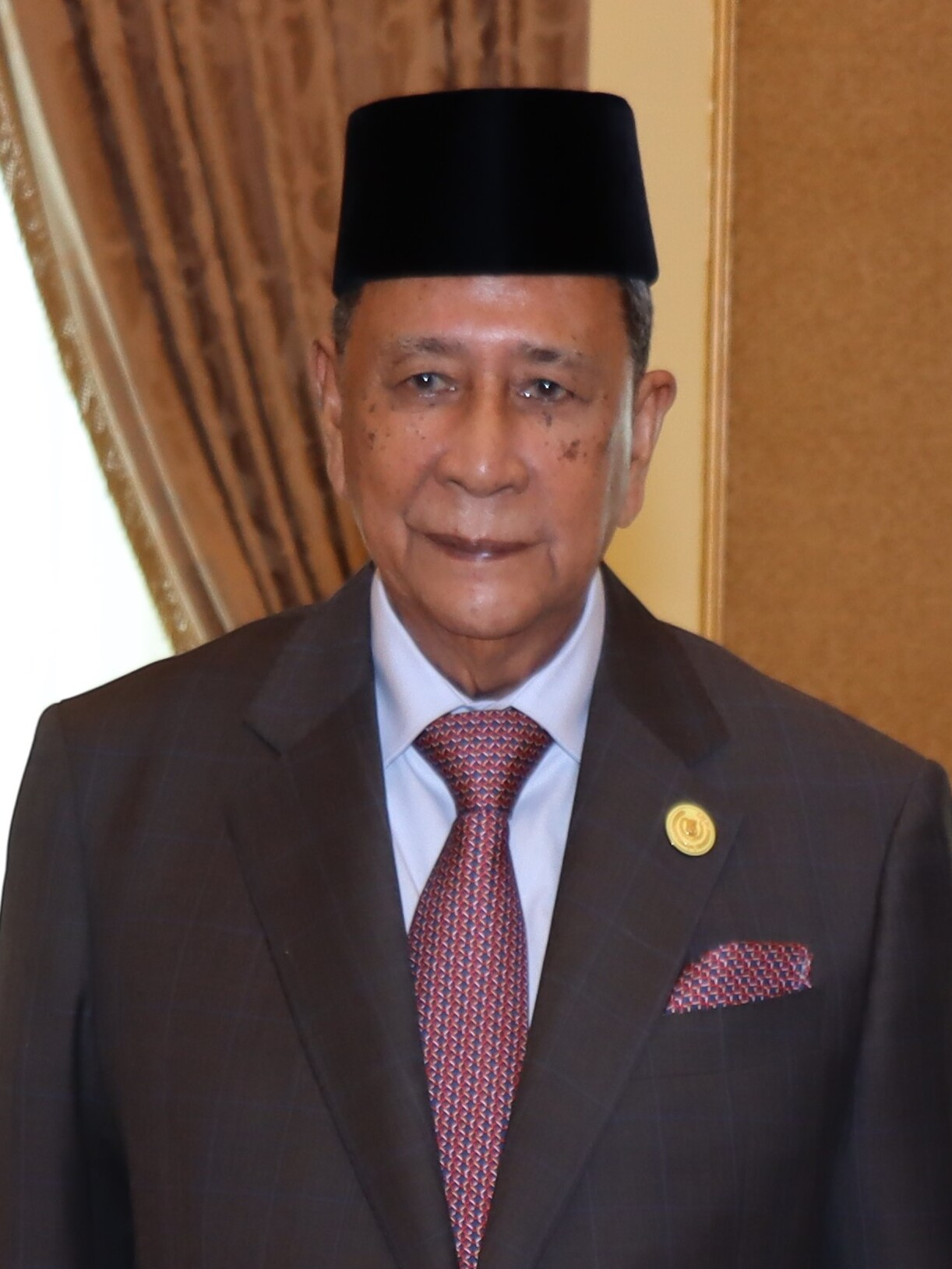
- Sallehuddin in 2024

Sultan of Kedah
- Reign: 12 September 2017 – present
- Installation: 22 October 2018
- Predecessor: Abdul Halim
- Heir apparent: Tunku Sarafudin Badlishah
- Menteris Besar: See list: Ahmad Bashah Md Hanipah Mukhriz Mahathir Muhammad Sanusi Md Nor
- Born: 30 April 1942 (age 84) (Note: His birthday is celebrated on the third Sunday of June); Alor Setar, Kedah, Malaya
- Spouse: Sultanah Maliha binti Tengku Ariff (m. 1965)
- Issue: Tunku Sarafudin Badlishah; Tunku Shazuddin Ariff
Names
- Tunku Mahmud Sallehuddin ibni Tunku Badlishah
Regnal name
- Al-Aminul Karim Sultan Sallehuddin ibni Almarhum Sultan Badlishah
- House: Mahawangsa
- Father: Sultan Badlishah
- Mother: Sultanah Asma
- Religion: Sunni Islam
- Military career
- Allegiance: Malaysia
- Branch: Malaysian Army
- Service years: 1964–present
- Rank: Major general
- Unit: Royal Malay Regiment
- Conflicts: Indonesia–Malaysia confrontation; Second Malayan Emergency

Al-Aminul Karim Sultan Sallehuddin ibni Almarhum Sultan Badlishah (Jawi: الأمين الکريم سلطان صالح الدين ابن المرحوم سلطان بدلي شاه; born 30 April 1942) is the 29th sultan of Kedah since ascending to the throne in September 2017 upon the death of his elder half-brother Abdul Halim. As the fourth son of Badlishah of Kedah that lived to adulthood, he was initially not expected to inherit the throne.

== Biography ==
Sultan Sallehuddin was born (as Tunku Mahmud Sallehuddin) and raised in Istana Anak Bukit, Alor Setar, Kedah. He was the ninth of 14 siblings, to Sultan Badlishah, the 27th Sultan of Kedah, and Sultanah Asma, daughter of Sultan Sulaiman of Terengganu.

He was educated at the Alor Merah Malay School and continued his studies at the Sultan Abdul Hamid College. He graduated with a higher education from the College of Military Engineering, Poona in India.

== Military career ==
Salehuddin's military career started when he underwent cadet training at the Indian Military Academy in Dehradun from 23 July 1962 to 30 June 1963. He was appointed Junior Lieutenant on 23 October 1963. On 12 February 1964, he was commissioned as a lieutenant and stationed with the 2nd Battalion of the Royal Malay Regiment in Pengkalan Chepa, Kota Bharu, Kelantan. He was later promoted to the rank of colonel.

During his service, Sallehuddin had been involved in several security operations at the border areas with Thailand.

== Tunku Temenggong of Kedah ==
Sallehuddin was proclaimed as Tunku Temenggong of Kedah on 28 November 1981. He became one of members of the Council of Regency when his eldest brother, Sultan Abdul Halim Mu'adzam Shah, served as the Yang di-Pertuan Agong from 2011 to 2016, and chaired the council after the death of his elder brother, Tunku Annuar, in 2014.

== Raja Muda of Kedah ==
Sallehuddin was proclaimed as Raja Muda of Kedah on 15 December 2016. He replaced Tunku Abdul Malik who died of natural causes on 29 November 2015 at Sultanah Bahiyah Hospital in Alor Setar.

As Raja Muda, Sallehuddin held a number of important positions including as chancellor of the Cyberjaya University College of Medical Sciences and president of the Kedah Islamic Religious Council.

== Sultan of Kedah ==
Sallehuddin was proclaimed as the 29th Sultan of Kedah on 12 September 2017 at the Istana Anak Bukit by the Kedah Menteri Besar, Datuk Seri Ahmad Bashah Md Hanipah. He succeeded his half-brother, Sultan Abdul Halim Mu'adzam Shah, upon his death on 11 September 2017. At the age of 75, he's the oldest monarch by the age at accession in South East Asia, surpassing King Maha Vajiralongkorn of Thailand who ascended to the throne 11 months before at the age of 64. He's also the shortest serving heir-apparent for only 8 months 28 days before ascending to the Throne. He was officially enthroned as sultan on 22 October 2018 and was awarded the sobriquet Al-Aminul Karim in a televised ceremony, the first since 1959, at the Istana Anak Bukit's Balai Besar.

The coronation ceremony was attended by the Crown Prince of Brunei, Al-Muhtadee Billah and his wife, Crown Princess Sarah, on behalf of Sultan Hassanal Bolkiah and by the former Prime Minister of Malaysia, Mahathir Mohamad, whose son, Mukhriz Mahathir, was the state's former Chief Minister.

As per his duties as sultan and head of the state of Kedah, he currently serves as the Colonel-in-chief of the Royal Malay Regiment.

== Marriage and children ==
Sultan Sallehuddin and Sultanah Maliha married on 26 November 1965 and have two sons:

- His Royal Highness Tengku Sarafudin Badlishah, the current Raja Muda of Kedah (Crown Prince)
- His Royal Highness Tunku Shazuddin Ariff, the current Tunku Mahkota of Kedah (Deputy Crown Prince) and second line of heir apparent

== Titles, styles, orders and recognitions ==
Styles of Al-Aminul Karim Sultan Sallehuddin
- Reference style: His Royal Highness
- Spoken style: Your Royal Highness
- Alternative style: Tuanku

The full title and style of Sultan Sallehuddin is:

His Royal Highness Al-Aminul Karim Sultan Sallehuddin ibni Almarhum Sultan Badlishah, D.K., D.K.H., D.K.S., D.M.N., D.U.K., D.K. (Kelantan)., D.K. (Johor)., D.K. (Perak)., D.K. (Selangor)., D.K. (Negeri Sembilan)., D.K. (Perlis)., D.K. (Pahang)., P.S.M., D.M.K., S.S.S.K., S.H.M.S., S.G.M.K., S.S.P.K., S.P.M.K., S.S.D.K., S.P.M.K. (Kelantan)., D.S.D.K., P.A.T., B.C.K., K.P.K., The Sultan and Sovereign Ruler of the State of Kedah Darul Aman

=== Honours of Kedah ===
- Grand Master of the State of Kedah Star of Valour (since 12 September 2017)
- Grand Master (since 12 September 2017) and Member of the Royal Family Order of Kedah (DK, 15 January 2017)
- Grand Master and Member of the Halimi Family Order of Kedah (DKH, since 12 September 2017)
- Founding Grand Master and Member of the Sallehuddin Family Order of Kedah (DKS, since 19 June 2022)
- Grand Master (since 12 September 2017) and Member of the Kedah Supreme Order of Merit (DUK, 2018)
- Grand Master and Member of the Supreme Order of Sri Mahawangsa (DMK, since 12 September 2017) – Dato' Seri Utama
- Grand Master of the State of Kedah Star of Gallantry (since 12 September 2017)
- Founding Grand Master and Knight Grand Companion of the Order of Loyalty to Sultan Sallehuddin of Kedah (SSSK, since 30 April 2018) – Dato' Seri Diraja
- Grand Master (since 12 September 2017) and Grand Commander (SHMS, 16 July 2008) of the Order of Sultan 'Abdu'l Halim Mu'azzam Shah – Dato' Seri Diraja
- Grand Master and Knight Grand Commander of the Glorious Order of the Crown of Kedah (SGMK, since 12 September 2017) – Dato' Seri Wira
- Grand Master and Knight Grand Commander of the Order of the Crown of Kedah (SPMK, since 12 September 2017) – Dato' Seri
- Order of Loyalty to the Royal House of Kedah
  - Grand Master (since 12 September 2017) and Knight Grand Companion (SSDK, 25 January 1987) – Dato' Seri
  - Knight Companion (DSDK, 1982) – Dato'
- Founding Grand Master (since 1 November 2021) and Knight Grand Commander of the Glorious Order of the Loyal Warrior of Kedah (SSPK, 30 June 2024) – Dato' Seri Pahlawan
- Recipient of the State of Kedah Distinguished Service Star (BCK, 28 November 1970)
- Recipient of the Silver Jubilee Medal (15 July 1983)
- Recipient of the Golden Jubilee Medal (15 July 2008)
- Recipient of the Sultan Sallehuddin Installation Medal (22 October 2018)

=== Honours of Malaysia ===
- Malaysia
  - Recipient of the Order of the Crown of the Realm (DMN) (15 October 2018)
  - Commander of the Order of Loyalty to the Crown of Malaysia (PSM) – Tan Sri (5 June 2011)
  - Mention in dispatches (KPK) (1974)
  - Recipient of the General Service Medal (PPA)
  - Recipient of the 14th Yang di-Pertuan Agong Installation Medal (11 April 2012)
  - Recipient of the 15th Yang di-Pertuan Agong Installation Medal (24 April 2017)
  - Recipient of the 16th Yang di-Pertuan Agong Installation Medal (30 July 2019)
  - Recipient of the 17th Yang di-Pertuan Agong Installation Medal (20 July 2024)
- Malaysian Armed Forces
  - Warrior of the Most Gallant Order of Military Service (PAT, 25 September 2012)
- Johor
  - First Class of the Royal Family Order of Johor (DK I, 30 October 2017)
  - Recipient of Sultan Ibrahim Ismail Coronation Medal - First Class of Gold Medal
- Kelantan
  - Recipient of the Royal Family Order of Kelantan (DK) (30 September 2017)
  - Knight Grand Commander of the Order of the Crown of Kelantan (SPMK) – Dato' (12 November 2016)
  - Sultan Muhammad V Proclamation Medal (13 September 2010)
- Negeri Sembilan
  - Member of the Royal Family Order of Negeri Sembilan (DKNS, 14 January 2018)
- Pahang
  - Member 1st class of the Family Order of the Crown of Indra of Pahang (DK I, 5 September 2019)
- Perak
  - Recipient of the Royal Family Order of Perak (DK, 4 December 2017)
  - Recipient of the Sultan Nazrin Shah Installation Medal (6 May 2015)
- Perlis
  - Recipient of the Perlis Family Order of the Gallant Prince Syed Putra Jamalullail (DK, 17 July 2018)
  - Recipient of Tuanku Syed Sirajuddin Jamalullail Silver Jubilee Medal (2025)
- Selangor
  - First Class of the Royal Family Order of Selangor (DK I, 25 January 2018)

Sallehuddin of Kedah House of Kedah Born: 30 April 1942
Regnal titles
Preceded by Abdul Halim	Sultan of Kedah; 2017–present	Incumbent; Heir apparent: Tunku Sarafuddin Badlishah, Raja Muda
