= Anak Bukit =

Town in Kota Setar, Kedah, Malaysia

- Royal town, suburb of Alor Setar
- Interactive map of Anak Bukit
- Anak Bukit in Kedah Anak Bukit (Malaysia) Anak Bukit (Southeast Asia)
- Coordinates: 6°10′57.6228″N 100°22′26.67″E
- Country: Malaysia
- State: Kedah
- District: Kota Setar

Government
  - Type: City council
  - Body: Alor Setar City Council
- Time zone: UTC+8 (Malaysian Standard Time)
- Postcode: 05150

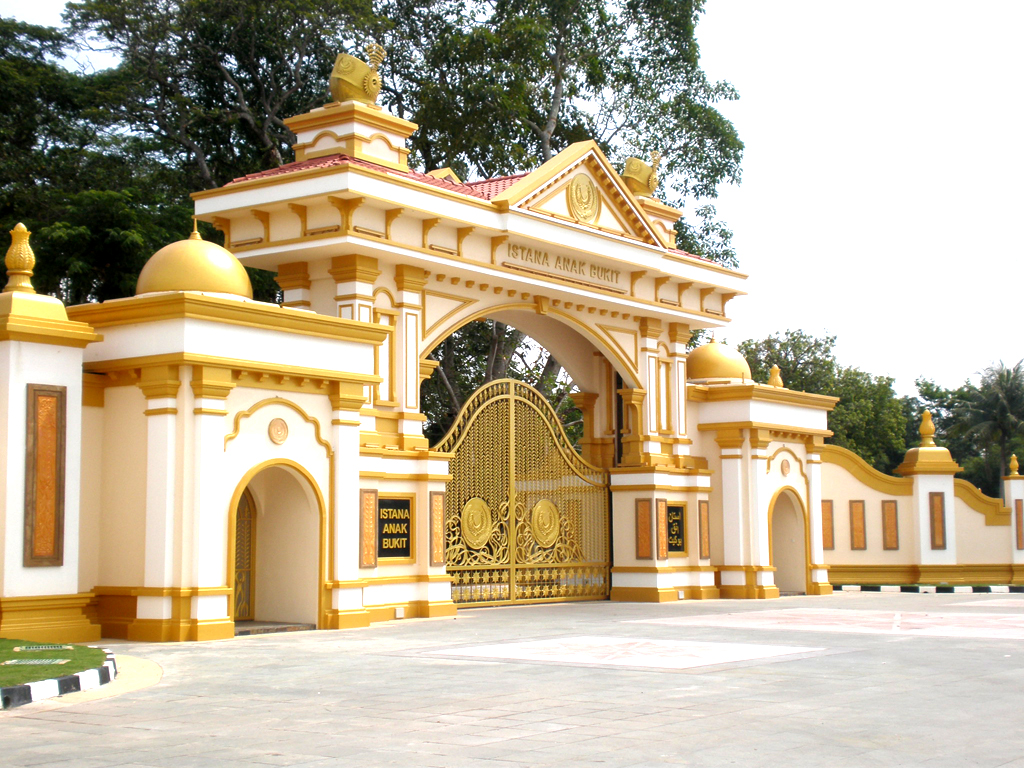
Istana Anak Bukit main entrance

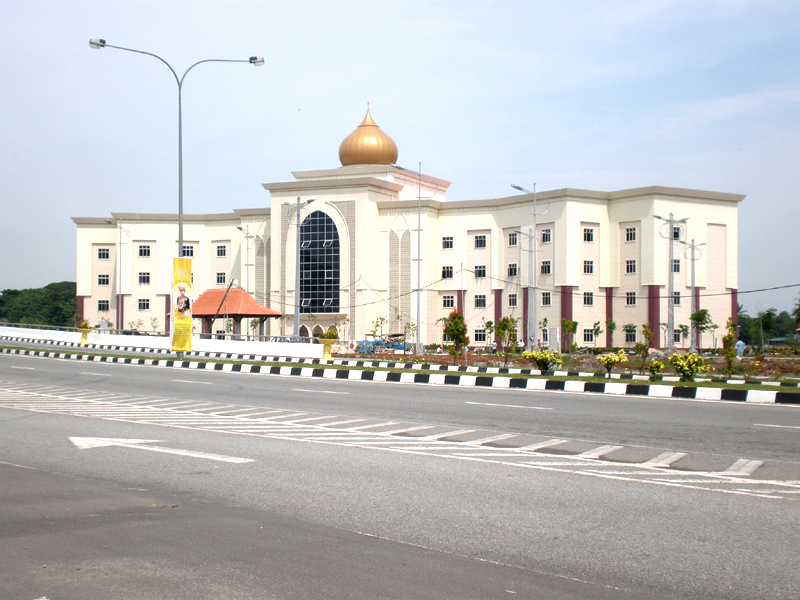
New Syariah Court building on the West side

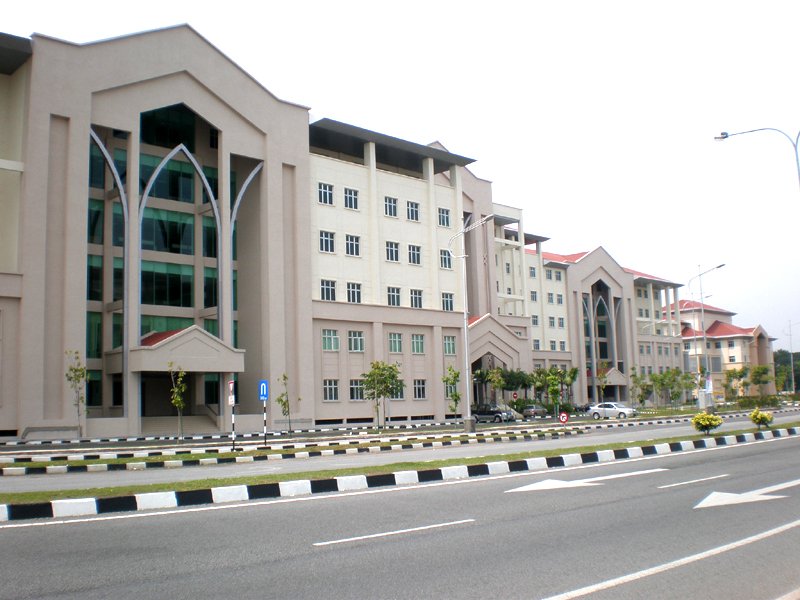
Complete administrative building on the East side

Mukim Anak Bukit in Kota Setar District

Anak Bukit is a mukim and the royal town of Kedah, Malaysia, located in Kota Setar District and falls under the jurisdiction of the Alor Setar City Council.

== Royal Town ==
It is known as the royal town of Kedah because the Sultan of Kedah's royal palace and official residence, Istana Anak Bukit is located here. It is also known to be the birthplace of the late Sultan of Kedah and the former Yang Di Pertuan Agong of Malaysia, Tuanku Abdul Halim Muadzam Shah who reigned from 1958 until his death in September 2017.

In February 2009, the palace underwent a RM70 million facelift in conjunction with the 50th anniversary celebration of the reign of the Sultan of Kedah in 2008. This involved the construction of a new building which houses a new audience and dining halls which could accommodate 1,400 people at any one time. It replaced the existing audience and dining halls which could only hold fewer than 1,000 people. The building was completed in October 2007.

Behind the royal palace there is a river stream which is called Sungai Anak Bukit and it flows through Alor Setar connected by Sungai Kedah (Kedah River) to the estuary of Kuala Kedah.

There is also a mini zoo amidst the colourful flora of the royal gardens. Visitors are allowed into the royal gardens.

== Development ==
According to the Ninth Malaysia Plan, Anak Bukit is planned to be the new administrative capital of Kedah, replacing Alor Setar. Alor Setar will continue to be the capital city and commercial centre of the state.

Due to that, Anak Bukit is seeing a massive growth of infrastructure. Major developments include the new state government administrative buildings, the new Anak Bukit police station, new National Registration Department (Jabatan Pendaftaran Negara) building.

A new railway station was also built as part of the Ipoh-Padang Besar Electrification and Double Tracking Project and began operations in 2014. It is served by ETS Transit trains.

== Residential Area ==
Residential properties are also coming up in the town because it will be the new administrative centre. Prices of houses and land have been rising the past few years.

One of the more luxurious housing projects is Villa Seri Tunku. It is touted as luxury living in a village ambience, consisting of 27 modern village bungalow units adjacent to Istana Anak Bukit. The units, priced between RM400,000 and RM1.2 million, have been sold out.

The housing project was opened by the current Sultan of Kedah.

== Transport ==
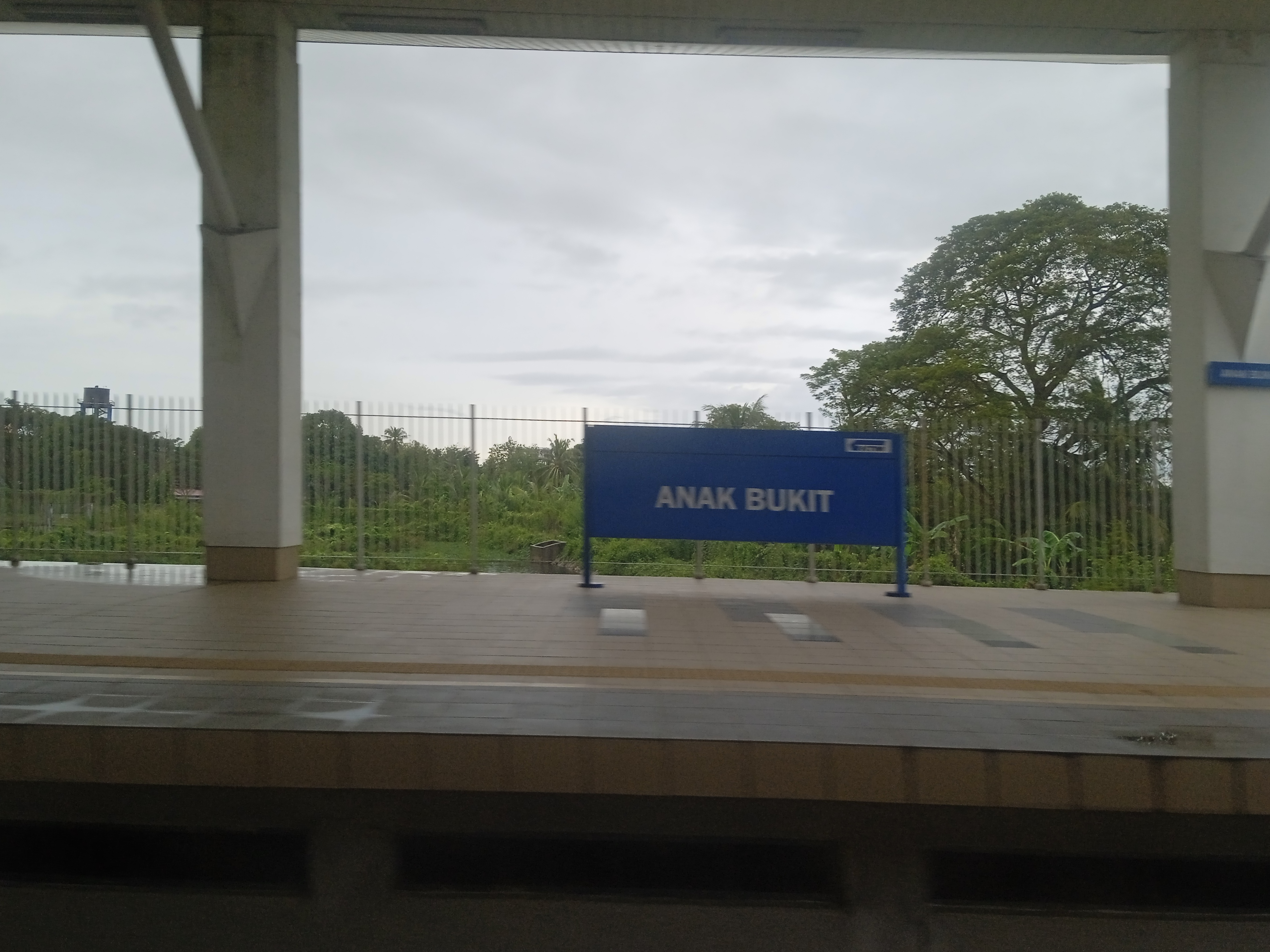
Platform at Anak Bukit station

Anak Bukit served by KTM Komuter Northern Sector, at Anak Bukit railway station.

== See also ==
- Putrajaya
- Royal capitals of Malaysian states
