= Succession to the Malaysian thrones =

Malaysia practises an elective monarchy, so there is no distinct line of succession to the Malaysian thrones. In the event where the current seat of the throne falls vacant (due to death, incapacitation or resignation), the Conference of Rulers meet to elect the new Yang di-Pertuan Agong (monarch) from among the rulers of the nine Malay states. The deputy king does not automatically succeed the throne. The election is regulated by Article 32 of the Constitution of Malaysia.

By convention, the Yang di-Pertuan Agong has been elected by the established order of seniority of the states.

== Federal throne ==
| Turning | State | Ruler | On the Federal Throne | Remarks |
|---|---|---|---|---|
| 1 | Negeri Sembilan | Muhriz (since 29 December 2008) | N/A | |
| 2 | Selangor | Sharafuddin (since 22 November 2001) | N/A | |
| 3 | Perlis | Sirajuddin (since 17 April 2000) | 13 December 2001 – 12 December 2006 | 12th King |
| 4 | Terengganu | Mizan (since 15 May 1998) | 13 December 2006 – 12 December 2011 | 13th King |
| 5 | Kedah | Sallehuddin (since 12 September 2017) | N/A | |
| 6 | Kelantan | Muhammad V (since 13 September 2010) | 13 December 2016 – 6 January 2019 | 15th King |
| 7 | Pahang | Abdullah (since 11 January 2019) | 31 January 2019 – 30 January 2024 | 16th King |
| 8 | Johor | Ibrahim (since 23 January 2010) | 31 January 2024 – present | 17th King |
| 9 | Perak | Nazrin (since 29 May 2014) | N/A | Deputy King |

== State throne ==
States' thrones are as follows.

=== Negeri Sembilan ===
Negeri Sembilan is unique in that it is the only State in Malaysia which practices an elective monarchy instead of a linear dynasty. The four largest luak (districts) in Negeri Sembilan each elect an Undang (viceroy), who are also the kingmakers of the State. When the position of the Yamtuan Besar falls vacant, the four Undangs will be called upon to appoint a successor among the Princes of Four. They are the Tunku Besar of Seri Menanti (currently Tunku Ali Redhauddin), the Tunku Laxamana (currently Tunku Naquiyuddin), the Tunku Muda of Serting (currently Tunku Imran) and the Tunku Panglima Besar (currently Tunku Zain Al-'Abidin). The current Yamtuan Besar is Tuanku Muhriz.

=== Selangor ===
- Sultan Salahuddin Abdul Aziz Shah (1926–2001)
  - Sultan Sharafuddin Idris Shah (born 1945)
    - (1) Tengku Amir Shah, Raja Muda, the Crown Prince (born 1990)
  - (2) Tengku Sulaiman Shah, Tengku Laksamana (born 1950)
    - (3) Tengku Shakirinal Sulaiman Shah (born 1980)
      - (4) Tengku Mahmood Shakirinal Shah (born 2010)
      - (5) Tengku Sulaiman Shakirinal Shah (born 2013)
      - (6) Tengku Abdulaziz Shakirinal Shah (born 2017)
    - (7) Tengku Salehuddin Sulaiman Shah, Tengku Indera Bijaya Diraja (born 1982)
      - (8) Tengku Ibrahim Salehuddin Shah (born 2014)
    - (9) Tengku Shahrain Sulaiman Shah (born 1985)
    - (10) Tengku Shariffuddin Sulaiman Shah (born 1987)
  - (11) Tengku Abdul Samad Shah, Tengku Panglima Besar (born 1953)
    - (12) Tengku Musahiddin Shah, Tengku Seri Perkasa Diraja (born 1984)
  - (13) Tengku Ahmad Shah, Tengku Panglima Raja (born 1955)
    - (14) Tengku Alam Shah Ammiruddin (born 1982)

=== Perlis ===
- Tuanku Syed Putra (1920–2000)
  - Tuanku Syed Sirajuddin (born 1943)
    - (1) Tuanku Syed Faizuddin Putra, Raja Muda, the Crown Prince (born 1967)
      - (2) Syed Sirajuddin Areeb Putra (born 2009)
  - (3) Syed Badaruddin, Tengku Sharif Bendahara (born 1945)
    - (4) Syed Mashafuddin (born 1974)
  - (5) Syed Amir Zainal Abidin, Tengku Sharif Temenggong (born 1950)
    - (6) Syed Budriz Putra, Engku Maharaja Lela Setia Paduka of Selangor (born 1972)
      - (7) Syed Aqil Harrith (born 2001)
  - (8) Syed Razlan, Tengku Sharif Laksamana (born 1951)
    - (9) Syed Muhammad Hazrain (born 1978)
      - (10) Syed Hazriq (born 2003)
      - (11) Syed Hazriv (born 2007)
    - (12) Syed Muhammad Hafiz (born 1981)
  - (13) Syed Zainol Anwar, Tengku Sharif Panglima (born 1952)
    - (14) Syed Haizam Hishamuddin Putra, Engku Panglima Setia Diraja of Selangor (born 1983)
      - (15) Syed Azlan Salahuddin Putra
    - (16) Syed Jufri Dhiauddin Putra (born 1992)
      - (17) Syed Ayden Husain Mateen Aziz Putra
  - (18) Syed Zainal Rashid (born 1953)
  - (19) Syed Azni (born 1954)
    - (20) Syed Fariz Naqiuddin (born 1985)
    - (21) Syed Haniff Iskandar (born 1992)
  - (22) Syed Badlishah (born 1958)
    - (23) Syed Fezriq (born 1980)
    - (24) Syed Felsham (born 1984)
    - (25) Syed Fernash (born 1988)

=== Terengganu ===
- Sultan Mahmud al-Muktafi billah Shah (1930–1998)
  - Sultan Mizan Zainal Abidin (born 1962)
    - (1) Tengku Muhammad Ismail, Yang di-Pertuan Muda, the Crown Prince (born 1998)
    - (2) Tengku Muhammad Mua’az, Tengku Sri Setia Mahkota Raja (born 2000)
  - (3) Tengku Mustafa Kamil, Tengku Sri Bendahara Raja (born 1968)
    - (4) Tengku Sharif Mahmud
    - (5) Tengku Daniel Haqim
    - (6) Tengku Nabil al-Muktafi
  - Tengku Badrul Zaman, Tengku Sri Panglima Raja (1974–2026)
    - (7) Tengku Muhammad Ryan Faiz
    - (8) Tengku Reyad Feysal
  - (9) Tengku Badrulhisham Baharuddin, Tengku Sri Temenggung Raja (born 1976)
    - (10) Tengku Muhammad Ashman
    - (11) Tengku Muhammad Ariesh
    - (12) Tengku Muhammad Ozaer
    - (13) Tengku Muhammad Adreez
    - (14) Tengku Muhammad Mahmud Akbar Nasreddine Haqqani

=== Kedah ===
- Sultan Badlishah (1894–1958)
  - Sultan Abdul Halim Mu'adzam Shah (1927–2017)
  - Sultan Sallehuddin (born 1942)
    - (1) Tengku Sarafuddin Badlishah, Raja Muda, the Crown Prince (born 1967)
      - (2) Tunku Sulaiman Badlishah (born 2007)
    - (3) Tunku Shazuddin Ariff, Tunku Mahkota, Deputy Crown Prince (born 1970)
  - (4) Tunku Abdul Hamid Thani, Tunku Bendahara (born 1951)

=== Kelantan ===
- Sultan Ismail Petra (1949–2019)
  - Sultan Muhammad V (born 1969)
    - (-) Tengku Ismail Leon Petra (born 2019)
  - (-) Tengku Muhammad Fa-iz Petra (born 1974)
    - (-) Tengku Muhammad Johan Petra (born 2023)
  - (1) Tengku Muhammad Fakhry Petra, Tengku Mahkota, the Crown Prince (born 1978)

=== Pahang ===
- Sultan Haji Ahmad Shah Al-Musta'in Billah (1930–2019)
  - Al-Sultan Abdullah Riayatuddin Al-Mustafa Billah Shah (born 1959)
    - (1) Tengku Hassanal Ibrahim Alam Shah, Tengku Mahkota, the Crown Prince (born 1995)
    - (2) Tengku Muhammad Iskandar Ri'ayatuddin Shah, Tengku Arif Bendahara (born 1997)
    - (3) Tengku Ahmad Ismail Mu'adzam Shah, Tengku Panglima Perang (born 2000)
  - (4) Tengku Abdul Rahman, Tengku Muda (born 1960)
    - (5) Tengku Eddie Akasya (born 2004)
    - (6) Tengku Ahmad Firhan Shah (born 2005)
    - (7) Tengku Armaan Alam Shah (born 2010)
  - (8) Tengku Fahad Mua'adzam Shah, Tengku Arif Temenggong (born 1994)

=== Johor ===
- Sultan Iskandar (1932–2010)
  - Sultan Ibrahim (born 1958)
    - (1) Tunku Ismail, Tunku Mahkota, the Crown Prince (born 1984)
      - (2) Tunku Iskandar Abdul Jalil Abu Bakar Ibrahim, Raja Muda, Deputy Crown Prince (born 2017)
      - (3) Tunku Abu Bakar Ibrahim (born 2019)
    - (4) Tunku Idris Iskandar, Tunku Temenggong (born 1987)
    - (5) Tunku Abdul Rahman Hassanal Jefri, Tunku Panglima (born 1993)
    - (6) Tunku Abu Bakar, Tunku Putera (born 2001)
  - (7) Tunku Abdul Majid, Tunku Aris Bendahara (born 1970)
    - (8) Tunku Mahmood Iskandar (born 2006)
    - (9) Tunku Abdul Mateen Idris Ismail Ibrahim Iskandar (born 2015)

=== Perak ===
In contrast to the other Malaysian sultanates, the ruling dynasty of Perak utilizes a somewhat complex order of succession.

The reigning Sultan appoints princes in the male line of descent from a Sultan to certain high princely titles. They are arranged in a strict order of precedence indicating the order of succession to the throne. As per a ruling of 25 February 1953, the present hierarchy of titles and the corresponding order of succession is as follows:

1. Raja Muda (Crown Prince, currently Raja Jaafar)
2. Raja Di-Hilir (Deputy Crown Prince, currently Raja Iskandar Dzulkarnain)
3. Raja Kecil Besar (Grand Minor Prince, currently Raja Azlan Muzzaffar Shah)
4. Raja Kecil Sulong (Eldest Minor Prince, currently Raja Ahmad Nazim Azlan Shah)
5. Raja Kecil Tengah (Middle Minor Prince, currently Raja Iskandar)
6. Raja Kecil Bongsu (Youngest Minor Prince, currently vacant)

While titleholders are usually appointed for life, titles may be revoked in cases of proven incompetence or disability. On the death or promotion of an existing titleholder, the holder of the next most senior title succeeds him. The Raja Muda is the heir apparent, and succeeds the ruling sultan on his demise, whereupon the prince holding the title of Raja Di-Hilir becomes the new Raja Muda. The Raja Kechil Besar then becomes the Raja Di-Hilir. The new Sultan may then appoint his own nominee to the junior-most title made vacant by these successions.

- Sultan Ahmad ud-din Shah (died 1806; r. 1792–1806)
  - Sultan Abdul-Malik Mansur Muazzam Shah Jamalullah (died 1825; r. 1806–1825)
    - Sultan Abdullah Muazzam Shah Khalilullah (c. 1805–1830; r. 1825-1830)
    - Tuanku Ahmad Shah Johan Berdaulat Khalifatullah, Yang di-Pertuan Muda (died 1820)
      - Sultan Jaafar Safi ud-din Muazzam Shah Waliullah (died 1865; r. 1857–1865)
        - Sultan Abdullah Muhammad Shah II Habibullah (1842–1922; r. 1874–1877)
        - Raja Musa I, Raja Muda (died 1906)
          - Sultan Abdul-Aziz al-Mutasim Billah Shah Nikmatullah (1887–1948; r. 1938–1948)
            - Raja Musa II, Raja Muda (1919–1983)
              - (1). Raja Jaafar, Raja Muda, Crown Prince (born 1941; Raja Muda, Crown Prince: 2014–present)
      - Raja Alang Iskandar Shah, Raja Bendahara (died 1849)
        - Sultan Idris I Murshid al-Azzam Shah Rahmatullah (1849–1916; r. 1887–1916)
          - Sultan Abdul Jalil Nasir ud-din al-Muhtaram Shah Radiullah (1870–1918; r. 1916–1918)
            - Sultan Yusuf Izz ud-din Rathiullah Ghafarullahulah Shah (1890–1963; r. 1948–1963)
              - Sultan Azlan Muhibuddin Shah Al-Maghfur-Lah (1928–2014; r. 1984–2014)
                - Sultan Nazrin Muizuddin Shah (born 1956; r. 2014–present)
                  - (3). Raja Azlan Muzzaffar Shah, Raja Kechil Besar (born 2008; Raja Kechil Besar: 2014–present)
                - Raja Ashman Shah, Raja Kechil Sulong (1958–2012; Raja Kechil Sulong: 2010–2012)
                  - (4). Raja Ahmad Nazim Azlan Shah, Raja Kechil Sulong (born 1994; Raja Kechil Sulong: 2014–present)
              - Raja Ziran @ Raja Zaid (died 1979)
                - (5). Raja Iskandar (born 1941; Raja Kechil Tengah: 2016–present)
          - Sultan Iskandar Shah al-Kaddasullah (1881–1938; r. 1918–1938)
            - Sultan Idris II al-Mutawakil Allahahi Afifu’llah Shah (1924–1984; r. 1963–1984)
              - (2). Raja Iskandar Dzulkarnain, Raja Di-Hilir, Deputy Crown Prince (born 1955; Raja Di-Hilir, Deputy Crown Prince: 2014–present)
  - Raja Inu Muhammad Saleh, Raja Kechil Lasa
    - Sultan Muhammad Shahab ud-din Riayat Shah Saifullah (died 1851; r. 1830–1851)
      - Sultan Ali al-Mukammil Inayat Shah Nabiullah (died 1871; r. 1865–1871)
