= Raja Ahmad Nazim Azlan Shah =

Raja Kecil Sulong of Perak
- Incumbent: 6 September 2014 – present
- Predecessor: Raja Ashman Shah
- Born: 10 March 1994 (age 32); Hospital Kuala Lumpur, Kuala Lumpur, Malaysia
- Spouse: Datin Seri Nadia Esham binti Esham (m. 2025)
Names
- Raja Ahmad Nazim Azlan Shah bin Raja Ashman Shah
- House: Siak–Perak
- Father: Raja Ashman Shah
- Mother: Dato’ Seri Noraini Jane
- Religion: Sunni Islam

Raja Dato' Seri Ahmad Nazim Azlan Shah bin Almarhum Raja Ashman Shah (born 10 March 1994) is a member of the Perak royal family and the current Raja Kecil Sulong (Eldest Minor Prince) of Perak. He is currently fourth in the line of succession to the throne of the Perak Sultanate.

== Family background ==
Ahmad Nazim is the only son of the late Raja Ashman Shah and Dato’ Seri Noraini Jane. He is of Malay and Anglo-Australian ancestry. His maternal grandmother is Australian of English descent. His maternal grandfather is Tan Sri Kamarul Ariffin Mohd Yassin, a former senator and the former chairman of Bank Bumiputra Malaysia Berhad. His paternal grandfather was the late Sultan Azlan Shah Al-Maghfur-Lah, the 34th Sultan of Perak while his paternal grandmother is Tuanku Bainun, the former Raja Permaisuri (queen consort) of Perak.

Ahmad Nazim's paternal uncle is the reigning and 35th Sultan of Perak, Sultan Nazrin Shah.

His sisters are Raja Eminah Alliyah and Raja Bainunisa Safia.

== Personal life ==
On 9 August 2025, Raja Dato’ Seri Ahmad Nazim married Datin Seri Nadia Esham. The wedding was held at the Istana Iskandariah, Kuala Kangsar.

== Education ==
Ahmad Nazim attended primary school at Sekolah Kebangsaan Bukit Damansara and completed his secondary education at Garden International School. He subsequently pursued his A-Levels at Marlborough College in England before attending Cambridge University, where he earned a Master of Engineering (MEng) degree.

== Career ==
Ahmad Nazim has worked as a Data Engineer and has held Data Science and Machine Learning Engineering roles at several startups in the Malaysian technology sector.

== Styles and honours ==
Styles of Raja Ahmad Nazim Azlan Shah
- Reference style: His Highness
- Spoken style: Your Highness
- Alternative style: Engku

- Member Second Class of the Azlanii Royal Family Order (DKA II) (24 April 2010)
- Knight Grand Commander of the Order of Cura Si Manja Kini (SPCM) – Dato' Seri (27 August 2016)

Yang Teramat Mulia Raja Kechil Sulong of Perak Darul Ridzuan Raja Ahmad Nazim Azlan Shah Ibni Almarhum Raja Ashman Shah Royal House of Perak Born: 10 March 1994
Malaysian royalty
Regnal titles
Lines of succession
Preceded by Raja Ashman Shah ibni Sultan Azlan Muhibbuddin Shah	Raja Kechil Sulong of Perak; Line of succession to the throne of Perak; 4th position 2014–present	Incumbent
