= Raja Yong Sofia =

Malaysian princess

- Born: Raja Yong Sofia binti Raja Azlan Shah; 24 June 1961 (age 65); Penang, Malaya
- Spouse: Tunku Kamil bin Tunku Rijaludin (m. 1987)
- Issue: Tunku Aznal Shahabudin; Tunku Khaira Shahabudin; Tunku Amira Shahabudin; Tunku Maisara Shahabudin
Names
- Raja Yong Sofia binti Almarhum Sultan Azlan Muhibbuddin Shah Al-Maghfur-Lah
- Father: Sultan Azlan Muhibbuddin Shah
- Mother: Raja Permaisuri Tuanku Bainun

Raja Yong Sofia binti Almarhum Sultan Azlan Muhibbuddin Shah Al-Maghfur-Lah (born 24 June 1961) is the fifth child of the 34th Sultan of Perak, Sultan Azlan Shah.

She holds a master's degree in Administration from International University in London. She worked for Bank Bumiputra.

== Biography ==
=== Wedding ===
She married at Kuala Kangsar, on 5 December 1987, Y.M. Tunku Dato' Sri Kamil bin Tunku Rijaludin (of Kedah, born in 1952).

He is son of Tunku Rijaludin bin Tunku Muhammad (of Kedah), a first cousin of the late Sultan Abdul Halim of Kedah, and his first wife, Raja Nur Azian binti Raja Harun Al-Rashid (of Perak), daughter of Raja Haji Harun al-Rashid of Perak, Raja Kechil Sulong, himself son of Sultan Sultan Idris Shah I of Perak, who is also Raja Yong Sofia's ancestor.

=== Childhood ===
Raja Yong Sofia was born at Penang, Malaya, 24 June 1961 as the fifth child of late Sultan Azlan Muhibbuddin Shah ibni Almarhum Sultan Yussuff Izzuddin Shah Ghafarullahu-lah, later Sultan Azlan Shah of Perak, and his wife Tuanku Bainun Binti Mohd Ali (herself a member of the Royal House of Perak and much fifth granddaughter of her husband's father Sultan Yussuff Izzuddin Shah of Perak)

Her siblings are:

- Raja Nazrin Shah (born 27 November 1956)
- Raja Azureen (born 9 December 1957)
- Raja Ashman Shah (born 28 December 1958 died 30 March 2012)
- Raja Eleena (born 3 April 1960)

=== Descent ===
She has one son:

- Tunku Aznal Shahabudin bin Tunku Kamil (of Kedah).

=== Family link of the spouses ===
Kamil of Kedah and Sultan Azlan of Perak (Yong Sofia's father) are second cousins:

- Sultan Sir Idris Murshid al-Azzam Shah GCMG, GCVO (1887–1916) -- Marhum Rahmatu'llah, né Y.A.M. Raja Idris [Dris], Raja Muda.
  - Sultan ‘Abdu’l Jalil Nasir ud-din Muhtaram KCMG, OBE ( – 20 January 1916 - November 1918) -- Marhum Radziallah
    - H.R.H. Sultan Yusuf Izz ud-din Rathiu’llah KCMG (15 January 1890 – 29 March 1948 – 4 January 1963) -- Marhum Ghafarullah.
      - H.R.H. Sultan ‘Azlan Muhib ud-din Shah GCB, KStJ (19 April 1928 – 3 February 1984 – 29 May 2014 ).
        - Y.A.M. Raja Datuk Sri Yong Sofia, SPCM (19.4.1989), born 24 June 1961
  - Y.A.M. Raja Haji Harun al-Rashid, Raja Kechil Sulong (1882 - 10 May 1945)
    - Y.M. Raja Nor Azian (of Perak) married Tunku Rijal ud-din bin Tunku Muhammad (of Kedah)
      - Y.M. Tunku Dato’ Sri Kamil (of Kedah), SPCM (19.4.1989), born 1953.
        - Y.M. Tunku Aznal Shahabudin bin Tunku Kamil (of Kedah)

== Honours ==
=== Honours of Raja Yong Sofia ===
==== Honours of Perak ====
- Member Second Class of the Azlanii Royal Family Order (DKA II) (2009)
- Knight Grand Commander of the Order of Cura Si Manja Kini (SPCM) – Dato' Seri (19 April 1989)

=== Honours of Tunku Kamil of Kedah ===
==== Honours of Perak ====
- Member Second Class of the Azlanii Royal Family Order (DKA II)
- Grand Knight of the Order of Cura Si Manja Kini (SPCM) – Dato' Seri (19 April 1989)
