= Zung =

Malaysian photographer

Heng Mok Zung (王睦錝; born 1978), more popularly known as Zung, is a photographer from Malaysia.

== Personal life ==
Zung was born in Sekinchan, Malaysia in 1978. He had an elder sister, who died of cancer when he was 18, just before he sat for his Sijil Pelajaran Malaysia examinations. He first took up photography while a student as a part-time job, with the aim of earning money to pursue a degree in engineering overseas, but eventually dropped out of his course to become a full-time photographer.

== Career ==
Zung is a self-taught photographer. Zung has photographed the Prime Minister of Malaysia Mahathir Mohamad and was the photographer for the wedding of Zara Salim Davidson & Raja Nazrin Shah, the Sultan of Perak state of Malaysia. He is the personal photographer for Anthony Robbins.

Zung has also shot Donald Trump (California 2012), and Andrea Bocelli (2010).
