= Tunku Soraya =

Consort of the Deputy Crown Prince of Perak (born 1960)

Tunku Soraya تونكو ثريا

Raja Puan Muda of Perak
- Incumbent: 20 June 2014 – present
- Predecessor: Raja Nor Mahani
- Born: Tunku Soraya binti Tengku Abdul Aziz; 30 April 1960 (age 66); Alor Setar, Kedah, Federation of Malaya
- Spouse: Raja Iskandar Dzurkarnain (m.1986)
- Issue: Raja Nabil Imran Abdul Aziz; Raja Idris Shah; Raja Sarina Intan Bahiyah; Raja Safia Azizah; Raja Siffudin Muazzam Shah
Names
- Tunku Soraya binti Almarhum Tengku Abdul Aziz
Regnal name
- Tunku Soraya binti Almarhum Sultan Abdul Halim Mu'adzam Shah
- House: Bendahara (by birth); Mahawangsa (by adopted); Siak-Perak (by marriage)
- Father: Tengku Abdul Aziz ibni Almarhum Sultan Sulaiman Badrul Alam Shah (biological); Sultan Abdul Halim Mu’adzam Shah (adoptive)
- Mother: Tunku Hamidah binti Almarhum Sultan Badlishah (biological); Sultanah Bahiyah (adoptive)
- Religion: Islam

Tunku Soraya binti Almarhum Sultan Abdul Halim Mu’adzam Shah (Jawi: تونكو ثريا بنت المرحوم سلطان عبدالحليم معظم شاه; born Tunku Soraya binti Tengku Abdul Aziz; born 30 April 1960) is the Raja Puan Muda (Deputy Crown Princess) of Perak as the wife of Raja Iskandar Dzurkarnain, the Raja Di-Hilir (Deputy Crown Prince) of Perak. She and her twin sister Tunku Sarina were adopted by their maternal uncle Sultan Abdul Halim and his consort Sultanah Bahiyah of Kedah as their daughters on 3 May 1960.

== Biography ==
Tunku Soraya was born on 30 April 1960 in Alor Setar, Kedah. She is the biological daughter of Tunku Hamidah, daughter of Sultan Badlishah of Kedah and her husband Tengku Abdul Aziz, son of Sultan Sulaiman Badrul Alam Shah of Terengganu.

She has a twin sister, the late Tunku Sarina binti Tengku Abdul Aziz who was married to Tunku Abdul Karim bin Tunku Ziauddin al-Haj. Tunku Sarina died in 1991 and was buried at the Langgar Royal Mausoleum.

On her biological father's side, she is a cousin of the 29th and current Sultan of Kedah, Sultan Sallehuddin, whilst on her adoptive father's side, she is also related to him as a niece.

On 3 May 1960, Sultan Abdul Halim and his wife Sultanah Bahiyah adopted both their then three-day old newborn twin nieces, Tunku Soraya and Tunku Sarina as their daughters whilst awaiting the birth of their own child. Six years later in 1966, the royal couple welcomed their only biological daughter, Tunku Puteri Intan Safinaz.

== Education ==
Tunku Soraya received her early education at both St Nicholas Convent, Alor Star and at Bukit Nenas Convent, Kuala Lumpur and later continued her studies at Brighton Polytechnic, Brighton, Sussex, England.

== Personal life ==
Tunku Soraya married Raja Iskandar Dzurkarnain, the son of Sultan Idris Al-Mutawakil Alallahi Shah of Perak and Raja Perempuan Muzwin, on 24 August 1986. They have three sons and two daughters.

Name	Birth	Place of birth	Age
His Highness (Yang Mulia) Raja Nabil Imran Abdul Aziz	2 August 1987	Kedah	39 years, 2 months and 28 days
His Highness (Yang Mulia) Raja Idris Shah	18 July 1989	Kedah	37 years, 3 months and 17 days
Her Highness (Yang Mulia) Raja Sarina Intan Bahiyah	12 June 1992	Kedah	34 years, 4 months and 23 days
Her Highness (Yang Mulia) Raja Safia Azizah	5 June 1996	Kedah	30 years, 4 months and 30 days
His Highness (Yang Mulia) Raja Siffudin Muazzam Shah	18 November 2000	Kedah	25 years, 11 months and 17 days

== Styles and honours ==
Styles of Tunku Soraya
- Reference style: Her Highness
- Spoken style: Your Highness
- Alternative style: Tuanku

The full title and style of Tunku Soraya is:

Her Highness Tunku Soraya binti Almarhum Sultan Abdul Halim Mu’adzam Shah, D.K.A. II., P.S.M., S.H.M.S., S.S.D.K., Raja Puan Muda of Perak

=== Honours of Perak ===
- Member Second Class of the Azlanii Royal Family Order (DKA II, 2010)
- Recipient of the Sultan Azlan Shah Silver Jubilee Medal (2009)
- Recipient of the Sultan Nazrin Shah Installation Medal (6 May 2015)

=== Honours of Malaysia ===
- Malaysia
  - Commander of the Order of Loyalty to the Crown of Malaysia (PSM) – Tan Sri (20 October 2016)
  - Recipient of the 14th Yang di-Pertuan Agong Installation Medal (11 April 2012)
  - Recipient of the 17th Yang di-Pertuan Agong Installation Medal (20 July 2024)
- Kedah
  - Grand Commander of the Order of Loyalty to Sultan Abdul Halim Mu'adzam Shah (SHMS) – Dato' Seri Diraja (16 July 2008)
  - Knight Grand Companion of the Order of Loyalty to the Royal House of Kedah (SSDK) – Dato' Seri (25 January 1987)
  - Recipient of the Sultan Abdul Halim Silver Jubilee Medal (15 July 1983)
  - Recipient of the Sultan Abdul Halim Golden Jubilee Medal (15 July 2008)
  - Recipient of the Sultan Sallehuddin Installation Medal (22 October 2018)

Duli Yang Amat Mulia Raja Puan Muda of Perak Darul Ridzuan Tunku Soraya binti Almarhum Sultan Abdul Halim Mu’adzam Shah Istana Al-Ridhuan; Istana Firuz, Ipoh, Perak Born: 30 April 1960
Malaysian royalty
Preceded by Raja Nor Mahani	Raja Puan Muda Perak; 20 June 2014	Incumbent
