= Raja Eleena =

Malaysian royal (born 1960)

- Born: Raja Eleena binti Raja Azlan Shah; 3 April 1960 (age 66); Penang, Malaya
- Spouse: Ismail Farouk bin Abdullah
- Issue: Omar Azlan; Puteri Alia Azleena; Imran Azlan; Ashman Azlan; Puteri Nur Iman Sofia
Names
- Raja Eleena binti Almarhum Sultan Azlan Muhibbuddin Shah Al-Maghfur-Lah
- Father: Sultan Azlan Muhibbuddin Shah
- Mother: Raja Permaisuri Tuanku Bainun

Raja Eleena binti Almarhum Sultan Azlan Muhibbuddin Shah Al-Maghfur-Lah (born 3 April 1960) is the fourth child of the 34th Sultan of Perak, Sultan Azlan Shah.

Raja Eleena was born on 3 April 1960 and she went to SMK Convent Bukit Nanas during her school years. She also holds a bachelor's degree in Law from the University of London. She is a lawyer with her own legal firm in Kuala Lumpur.

== Biography ==
Raja Eleena is also a practising barrister, being called by Lincoln's Inn, London, in 1985.

Upon returning to Malaysia, she joined Messrs Skrine & Co and was called to the Malaysian Bar in 1986. She set up her own legal practice Messrs Raja Eleena, Siew Ang & Associates in 1987, of which she is a senior partner.

Raja Eleena was appointed to the Board of Gamuda on 1 June 1992.

She is the niece of Kamarul Zaman bin Mohd Ali. She is a director and major shareholder of Generasi Setia (M) Sdn Bhd, which is a major shareholder of Gamuda.

Her directorships in other public companies are with KAF-Seagroatt & Campbell Holdings Berhad and Danau Permai Resort Berhad.

Raja Eleena was named in May 2007 as Malaysia's 25th richest in the country with assets worth over US$228 million (MYR 773 million). She becomes the list’s second woman after Chong Chook Yew, who occupies number 18th with US$320 million (MYR 1.085 billion).

=== Childhood ===
Raja Eleena was born at Penang, Malaya, 3 April 1960 as the fourth child of the late Sultan Azlan Muhibbuddin Shah ibni Almarhum Sultan Yussuff Izzuddin Shah Ghafarullahu-lah, later Sultan Azlan Shah of Perak, and his wife Tuanku Bainun Binti Mohd Ali (herself a member of the Royal House of Perak and much fourth granddaughter of her husband's father Sultan Yussuff Izzuddin Shah of Perak)

Her siblings are :

- Raja Nazrin Shah (born 27 November 1956)
- Raja Azureen (born 9 December 1957)
- Raja Ashman Shah (born 28 December 1958 died 30 March 2012)
- Raja Yong Sofia (born 24 June 1961)

== Honours ==
=== Honours of Raja Eleena ===
==== Honours of Perak ====
- Member Second Class of the Azlanii Royal Family Order (DKA II)
- Grand Knight of the Order of Cura Si Manja Kini (SPCM, 19 April 1989) - Dato' Seri

=== Honours of Ismail Farouk ===
==== Honours of Perak ====
- Member Second Class of the Azlanii Royal Family Order (DKA II)
- Grand Knight of the Order of Cura Si Manja Kini (SPCM, 19 April 1992) - Dato' Seri
