= Raja Iskandar =

Raja Kecil Tengah of Perak
- Tenure: 27 August 2016 – present
- Born: 1941 (age 84–85)
- Spouse: Che Puan Rokiah binti Haji Ibrahim
- Issue: Raja Muhammad Azryn Shah; Raja Muhammad Ibrahim Shah; Raja Anis Azyarina
Names
- Raja Dato’ Seri Iskandar bin Raja Ziran @ Raja Zaid
- House: Perak
- Father: Raja Ziran @ Raja Zaid ibni Almarhum Sultan Yussuff Izzuddin Shah Ghafarullahu-lah
- Mother: Raja Azian Aisha binti Raja Badiuzzaman
- Religion: Sunni Islam

Raja Iskandar bin Raja Ziran @ Raja Zaid is the Raja Kecil Tengah of Perak and the fifth in the line of succession to the throne of Malaysian state of Perak since 27 August 2016.

== Honours ==
- Grand Knight of the Order of Cura Si Manja Kini (SPCM) – Dato' Seri (2016)
