= Raja Ashman Shah =

Raja Kecil Sulong of Perak (1958–2012)

Raja Kecil Sulong of Perak
- Predecessor: Raja Iskandar Dzurkarnain
- Successor: Raja Ahmad Nazim Azlan Shah
- Born: 28 December 1958; George Town, Penang, Malaya
- Died: 30 March 2012 (aged 53); Bukit Damansara, Kuala Lumpur, Malaysia
- Burial: 30 March 2012; Al-Ghufran Royal Mausoleum, Kuala Kangsar, Perak
- Spouse: Noraini Jane binti Kamarul Ariffin
- Issue: Raja Emina Aliyyah; Raja Ahmad Nazim Azlan Shah; Raja Bainunisa Safia
Names
- Raja Ashman Shah ibni Raja Azlan Shah (as birth)
- Father: Sultan Azlan Muhibbuddin Shah Al-Maghfur-lah
- Mother: Raja Permaisuri Tuanku Bainun
- Religion: Sunni Islam (Sufism)

Raja Ashman Shah ibni Almarhum Sultan Azlan Muhibbuddin Shah Al-Maghfur-lah (28 December 1958 – 30 March 2012) was a member of the Perak royal family and the second son of the late Sultan Azlan Sultan. He was the fourth in line to the throne of the Perak Sultanate when he was the Raja Kecil Sulong (eldest minor prince) of Perak from 2010 until his death in 2012.

== Early life ==
Raja Ashman Shah was born at George Town, Penang, Malaya. 28 December 1958 as the third child of late Sultan Azlan Muhibbuddin Shah ibni Almarhum Sultan Yussuff Izzuddin Shah Ghafarullahu-lah, later Sultan Azlan Shah of Perak, and his wife Tuanku Bainun Binti Mohd Ali (herself a member of the Royal House of Perak and much third grandson of her husband's father Sultan Yussuff Izzuddin Shah of Perak)

His siblings are Raja Nazrin Shah (born 27 November 1956), Raja Azureen (born 9 December 1957), Raja Eleena (born 3 April 1960) and Raja Yong Sofia (born 24 June 1961).

== Education ==
Raja Ashman attended high school at St. John Institution, Kuala Lumpur. He held a bachelor's degree in economics from the University of Nottingham, a master's degree in law from Cambridge University, and a diploma in Business Law from the University of London, England. He was a barrister-at-law and a member of the English Bar.

== Professional career ==
Raja Ashman held a number of professional positions. He was the executive director of Dreamland Holdings from 1990, the chairman of the board of Trustees of the Haqqani Foundation Malaysia from 1994, the Chairman of Dwitasik, and the Director of KKB Engineering Bhd.

== Religion ==
Raja Ashman held an ijazah (permission of initiating seekers, teaching the masses and channelling divine energy) from Shaykh Nazim 'Adil al-Haqqani in the Naqshbandi Haqqani Sufi Order. Known as Sheikh Raja in the Sufi order, he was the representative of Shaykh Nazim in Malaysia and Singapore. He established the Naqshbandi zawiya in Kuala Lumpur. He was also revered by some members of the Order as one of Shaykh Nazim's worldwide successors.

== Personal life ==
He married Dato' Seri Noraini Jane binti Kamarul Ariffin (born 1960) on 26 September 1991 in Kuala Kangsar. She is the daughter of Tan Sri Kamarul Ariffin bin Muhammad Yassin, former Senator and chair of the Board of Trustees of the National Art Gallery.

They had one son and two daughters:

1. Raja Emina Aliyyah binti Almarhum Raja Ashman Shah (born 17 September 1992)
2. Raja Ahmad Nazim Azlan Shah bin Raja Ashman Shah, Raja Kecil Sulong (born 10 March 1994)
3. Raja Bainunisa Safia binti Raja Ashman Shah (born 3 April 1997)

== Death ==
Raja Ashman died on 30 March 2012, due to an asthma attack. He was survived by his wife, parents, siblings, and children. He was buried at the Al-Ghufran Royal Mausoleum near Ubudiah Mosque, Kuala Kangsar.

== Honours ==
He was awarded:

=== Honours of Perak ===
- Member Second Class of the Azlanii Royal Family Order (DKA II) (2010)
- Knight Grand Commander of the Order of Cura Si Manja Kini (SPCM) – Dato' Seri (19 April 1988)

== Ancestry ==
Ancestors of Raja Ashman Shah

16. Sultan Idris Shah I of Perak
8. Sultan Abdul Jalil of Perak
17. Raja Nuteh Aisha binti Sultan Yusuff
4. Sultan Yusuf Shah of Perak
18. Encik Muhammad Yunus
9. Che Yong Sofia binti Encik Muhammad Yunus
2. Sultan Azlan Shah of Perak
20. Dato Taib
10. Dato' Sri Ahmad bin Dato Taib
21. Che Aisha
5. Dato Hajjah Khadija binti Dato' Sri Ahmad
22. Dato Muhammad Yusuff
11. Che Fatima binti Dato Muhammad Yusuff
23. Che Zubaida
1. Raja Ashman Shah of Perak
12. Encik Man
6. Encik Muhammad Ali bin Encik Man
3. Che Bainun bint Encik Muhammad Ali
7. Che Putih
