= Raja Azlan Muzzaffar Shah =

Raja Kecil Besar of Perak
- Incumbent: 20 June 2014 – present
- Predecessor: Raja Iskandar Dzurkarnain
- Born: 14 March 2008 (age 18); Damansara Specialist Hospital, Selangor, Malaysia
Names
- Raja Azlan Muzzaffar Shah ibni Raja Nazrin Shah (at birth)
- House: House of Perak
- Father: Sultan Nazrin Muizzuddin Shah
- Mother: Tuanku Zara Salim
- Religion: Sunni Islam

Raja Dato' Seri Azlan Muzzaffar Shah Ibni Sultan Nazrin Muizzuddin Shah is a member of the Perak royal family and is the Raja Kecil Besar (Grand Minor Prince) of Perak and as such the third in line of succession to the throne of the Malaysian state of Perak.

== Styles, titles and honours ==
=== Styles and titles ===
Styles of Raja Azlan Muzzaffar Shah
- Reference style: His Highness
- Spoken style: Your Highness
- Alternative style: Engku

The full title and style of Raja Azlan Muzzaffar Shah is:

His Highness Raja Dato' Seri Azlan Muzzaffar Shah ibni Sultan Nazrin Muizzuddin Shah, S.P.C.M., S.P.M.P., Raja Kecil Besar of Perak

=== Honours of Perak ===
- Knight Grand Commander of the Order of Cura Si Manja Kini (SPCM) – Dato' Seri (23 April 2015)
- Knight Grand Commander of the Order of the Perak State Crown (SPMP) – Dato' Seri (23 April 2015)
- Recipient of the Sultan Azlan Shah Silver Jubilee Medal (2009)
- Recipient of the Sultan Nazrin Shah Installation Medal (6 May 2015)

Yang Teramat Mulia Raja Kechil Besar of Perak Darul Ridzuan Raja Azlan Muzzaffar Shah Ibni Sultan Nazrin Muizzuddin Shah Royal House of Perak Born: 14 March 2008
Malaysian royalty
Regnal titles
Lines of succession
Preceded by Raja Iskandar Dzulkarnain	Raja Kechil Besar of Perak; Line of succession to the throne of Perak; 3rd position 20 June 2014 – present	Incumbent
