= SMK Main Convent, Ipoh =

Coordinates: 4.594071°N 101.088939°E

SMK Convent Ipoh
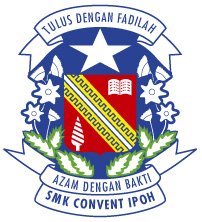

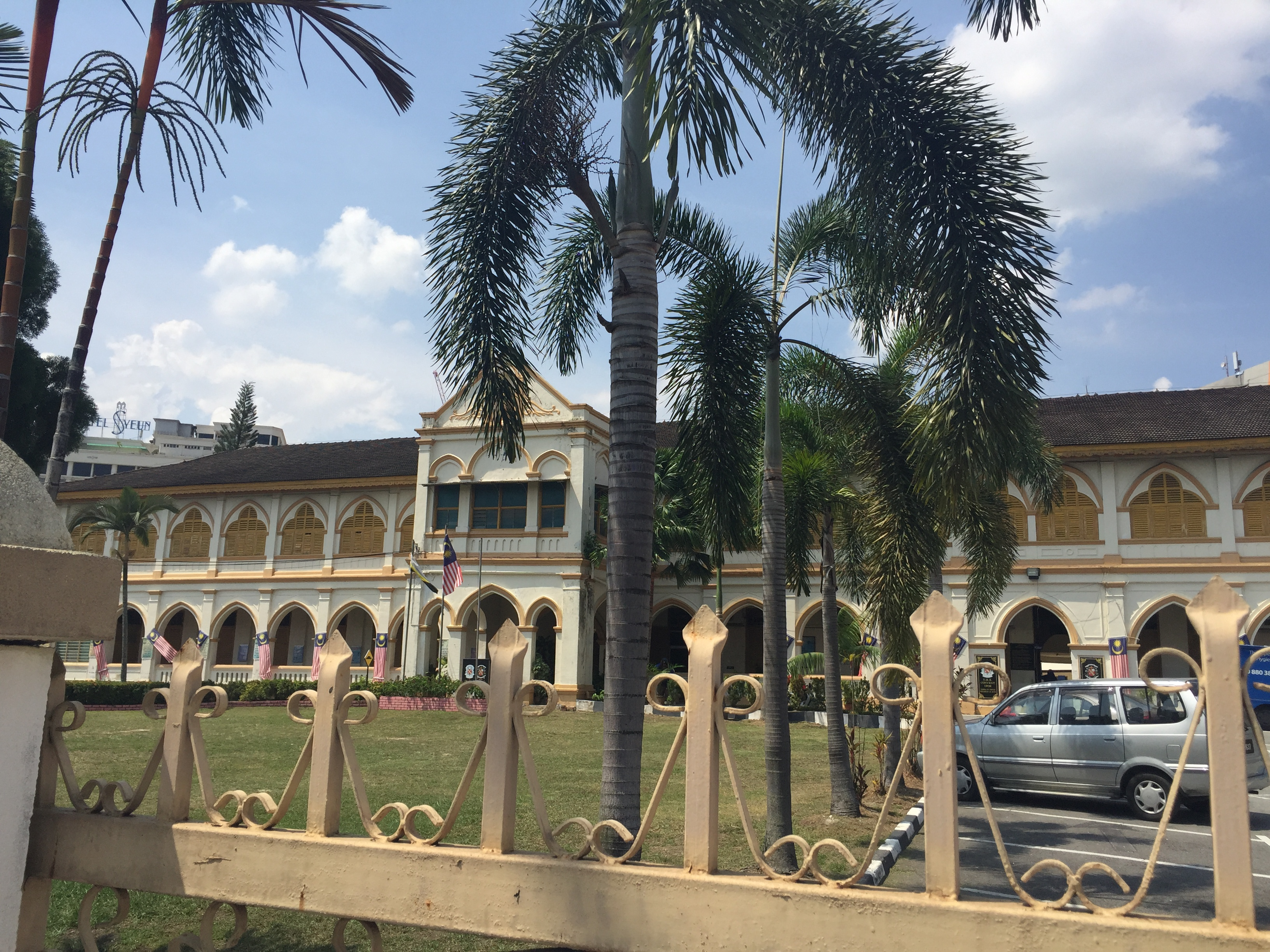
- Ipoh, Perak; Malaysia

Information
- Type: Government non-boarding all-girls secondary school
- Motto: Simple in Virtue, Steadfast in Duty
- Established: 7 January 1907
- Founder: Sisters of the Holy Infant Jesus
- Principal: None at the Moment
- Grades: Form 1 – Form 5 (Form 6 students usually transfer to St. Michael's Institution automatically)
- Website: www.smkci.edunet.my

SMK Convent Ipoh (Malay: Sekolah Menengah Kebangsaan Convent Ipoh) is an all-girls secondary school located on Jalan Sultan Idris Shah (formerly Brewster Road), Ipoh, Perak, Malaysia. Established as a Roman Catholic foundation in 1907, it is one of the oldest schools in Ipoh and is widely known as Main Convent Ipoh. Owned by the religious order the Sisters of the Holy Infant Jesus (IJS), SMK Main convent was formally a private missionary school and is one of around twenty convent secondary schools in Malaysia.

== Principals ==
- Sister St. Prudence (1907)
- Mother St. Marcellin (1922)
- Sister St. Helen (1939)
- Reverend Mother St. Pauline Legrix (1945 – Mar 1951)
- Reverend Mother St. Paul (1951–1957)
- Reverend Mother St. Pauline Legrix (1957–1966)
- Sister Fidelma Hogan (1966–1972)
- Sister Maureen Chew, PJK (1973–1991)
- Khoo Gim Keat (1992–1994)
- Mrs Valerie Ho (1994–1999)
- Mrs Shireen Ho (1999–2003)
- Ong Yok Kheng (2003–2004)
- Foo Ai Kia (2005–2006)
- Loh Wei Seng (2006–2010)
- Lim Swee Kew (2010–2011)
- Datin Mungit Kaur (2011–2012)
- Nalini Achuthan Nair (2012–2015)
- Toh Suat Goh (2015–2019)
- Foo Mei Mei (2019–2022)
- Chan Li Suan (2023–Present)

== Notable alumni ==
- Michelle Yeoh
- Amy Mastura
- Francissca Peter
- HRH Raja Permaisuri of Perak, Tuanku Zara Salim
- Preeta Samarasan
- Bernice Chauly
