= Tuanku Zara Salim =

Queen of Perak since 2014

Zara Salim زارا سليم
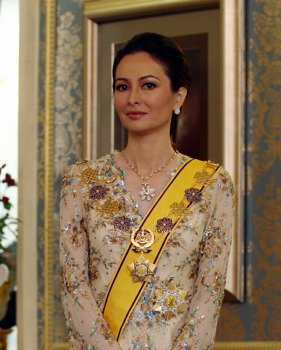
- Zara Salim on 18 May 2007

Raja Permaisuri of Perak
- Tenure: 20 June 2014 – present
- Installation: 6 May 2015
- Predecessor: Tuanku Bainun

Raja Puan Besar of Perak
- Tenure: 17 May 2007 – 28 May 2014
- Proclamation: 18 May 2007
- Predecessor: Che’ Puan Besar Bainun (as Che’ Puan Besar)
- Successor: Raja Nor Mahani
- Born: Zara binti Salim Davidson; 22 March 1973 (age 53); Ipoh, Perak, Malaysia
- Spouse: Sultan Nazrin Muizzuddin Shah (m. 2007)
- Issue: Raja Azlan Muzzaffar Shah; Raja Nazira Safya
Regnal name
- Tuanku Zara Salim
- House: House of Perak
- Father: William Stanley Walker Davidson
- Mother: Sharifah Azaliah Syed Omar Shahabudin
- Religion: Sunni Islam

Tuanku Zara Salim (Jawi: توانكو زارا سليم; born Zara Salim Davidson; 22 March 1973) is the current Raja Permaisuri (Queen consort) of Perak as the wife of Sultan Nazrin Muizzuddin Shah, the current Sultan of the Malaysian state of Perak.

A chemical engineer by training, she was heading an oil and gas consultancy firm based in Kuala Lumpur before her marriage to the Sultan. She and the Sultan, who had been the country's most eligible royal bachelor for decades, have known each other since the mid-1990s. She was officially installed as the Raja Permaisuri of Perak during Sultan Nazrin's enthronement ceremony as the 35th Sultan of Perak on 6 May 2015.

== Early life ==
Born in the city of Ipoh on 22 March 1973, she is the youngest of four children of William Stanley Walker Davidson (Salim Davidson), an Irishman and his ethnic Malay wife of mixed Arab and Thai descent, Sharifah Azaliah binti Syed Omar Shahabudin who is from Alor Setar, Kedah. She is also an extended member of Kedah Royal Family on her maternal side and has three elder brothers. Her father is a prominent lawyer in Perak and Kuala Lumpur.

Zara, who has a strong interest in foreign languages, studied at SMK Convent Ipoh and represented her school in squash and tennis from 1988 to 1990. She also represented Perak in swimming between 1981 and 1987.

After completing her A-Levels at Prime College in 1992, she left for the United Kingdom to study chemical engineering at the University of Nottingham and graduated with first class honours in July 1995. She also won the top student award for her final-year project.

Coincidentally her father-in-law, the late Sultan Azlan Shah, read law at the same university and was conferred the Bachelor of Laws degree in 1953 before being admitted to the English Bar in 1954.

== Career ==
Zara joined the Business Evaluation Department in the Corporate Planning Unit of Petronas in December 1995 and was part of the team responsible for the successful establishment of the Kertih and Kuantan integrated petrochemical complexes, whose foreign partners included BP, BASF, Dow Chemicals and Mitsubishi.

She then became a project analyst in the Petronas Petrochemical Business Unit and was part of the core team developing the Petronas brand essence, which now forms part of the Petronas global branding strategy.

Between February 1999 and October 2000, she was a product manager at Petlin (Malaysia) Sdn Bhd, a Petronas joint venture with DSM of the Netherlands and Sasol of South Africa. She was also part of the Petronas project team to operationalise the largest single-train low-density polyethylene (LDPE) plant in the world at Kertih.

Zara left Petronas in November 2001 to become an account manager at Formis Network Services Sdn Bhd and then assumed the post of vice-president of partnerships and alliances at Formis (Malaysia) Berhad, a technology-based company listed on Bursa Malaysia, between 2003 and 2005.

Between 2005 and 2007, Zara, who is a certified life-saver and adventure sports enthusiast, became the managing director of Forthwave Consulting Sdn Bhd, a hydrocarbon technical engineering and software development company in Kuala Lumpur.

== Royal connections ==
Zara Salim Davidson is the great-grandchild of Kedah's 26th ruler Sultan Abdul Hamid Halim Shah, Utusan Malaysia reported.

The Sultan ruled Kedah for 62 years from 1881 to 1943 and one of the Sultan's sons was Tunku Abdul Rahman, Malaysia's first prime minister. Therefore, she is also the grandniece of the Tunku and a niece of Sultan Abdul Halim Mu'adzam Shah and of the current sultan, Sultan Sallehuddin.

According to Zara's uncle Syed Mohd Aldinuri Syed Omar, Zara's mother Sharifah Azaliah Syed Omar was the daughter of Tunku Aminah, who was the daughter of Sultan Abdul Hamid and Che Manjalara.

From the marriage to Che Manjalara, Sultan Abdul Hamid had seven children, including Tunku Abdul Rahman Putra Al-Haj and Tunku Aminah.

Zara also has a close relationship with the late Sultan of Kedah, Sultan Abdul Halim Mu'adzam Shah Sultan Badlishah, who is the grandson of Sultan Abdul Hamid and a nephew to Tunku Abdul Rahman.

She is also the granddaughter of the former Kedah Menteri Besar Tan Sri Syed Omar Syed Abdullah Shahabudin. Tunku Aminah married Syed Omar, who became Kedah's second Menteri Besar after independence, from July 1959 to December 1967.

== Marriage and children ==
Zara's wedding to Raja Nazrin Shah was held at Istana Iskandariah on 17 May 2007.

A day after the solemnisation of their vows, there was a special proclamation ceremony to bestow upon her the honorific prefix of Tuanku and the official title as Raja Puan Besar (Crown Princess) of Perak, a title reserved for the royal wife of the Raja Muda (Crown Prince) of Perak that had been vacant since April 1987.

The royal wedding reception took place on 19 May 2007.

The couple's first child, a son named Raja Azlan Muzzaffar Shah, the Raja Kecil Besar of Perak was born 14 March 2008. Their second child, a daughter named Raja Nazira Safya, was born 2 August 2011.

== Current activities and social contributions ==
On July 9, 2007, a purple, hybrid orchid was named Dendrobium Tuanku Zara Salim in honour of her visit to the 7th Ipoh International Orchid Festival.

She is the current Chancellor of the Sultan Idris Education University (UPSI), and was proclaimed on 1 January 2012.

She has been awarded an Honorary Fellowship by the Institution of Chemical Engineers (IChemE) in April 2014 in recognition of her interest in the continued improvement of Malaysia's education and academic performance.

She then was made as the first Royal Patron of the IChemE in Malaysia in October 2016. On accepting the honour, Tuanku Zara said that chemical engineering can be a challenging career, but rewarding as well. Chemical engineers are highly employable, have wide and diverse career options, and can make a big impact in society and the environment. She intends to, as Royal Patron of the IChemE, do her part to inspire the younger generation to consider chemical engineering as a viable career choice.

She is also a patron of the Family Health Society of Perak, Convent Girls Alumni and Perak Girl Guides.

== Styles and honours ==
Styles of Tuanku Zara Salim
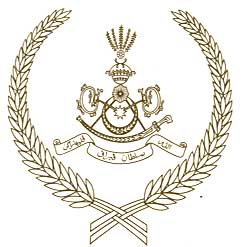
- Reference style: Her Royal Highness
- Spoken style: Your Royal Highness
- Alternative style: Tuanku

- Recipient of the Royal Family Order of Perak (DK) (6 May 2015)
- Superior Class of the Perak Family Order of Sultan Azlan Shah (DKSA) (18 May 2007)
- Member First Class of the Azlanii Royal Family Order (DKA)

Tuanku Zara Salim Royal House of Perak Born: 22 March 1973
Malaysian royalty
Preceded by Vacant since April 1987	Raja Puan Besar of Perak; 2007–2014	Succeeded by Raja Nor Mahani
Preceded by Tuanku Bainun	Raja Permaisuri of Perak; 2014 – present	Incumbent
