= Raja Iskandar Dzurkarnain =

Deputy Crown Prince of Perak (born 1955)

Raja Iskandar Dzurkarnain راج إسكندر ذوالقرنين
- Raja Di-Hilir of Perak

Deputy Crown Prince of Perak
- Incumbent: 20 June 2014 - present
- Predecessor: Raja Jaafar
- Born: Raja Iskandar Dzurkarnain bin Raja Idris Shah; 8 February 1955 (age 71); Hospital Kuala Kangsar, Kuala Kangsar, Perak, Malaya
- Spouse: Tunku Soraya (m. 1986)
- Issue: Raja Nabil Imran Abdul Aziz; Raja Idris Shah; Raja Sarina Intan Bahiyah; Raja Safia Azizah; Raja Siffudin Muazzam Shah
Names
- Raja Iskandar Dzurkarnain bin Raja Idris Shah
Regnal name
- Raja Iskandar Dzurkarnain ibni Almarhum Sultan Idris A’fifullah Shah
- House: House of Perak (by birth); House of Kedah (by marriage)
- Father: Sultan Idris Shah II
- Mother: Raja Perempuan Muzwin
- Religion: Sunni Islam

Raja Iskandar Dzurkarnain ibni Almarhum Sultan Idris A’fifullah Shah (Jawi: راج إسكندر ذوالقرنين ابن المرحوم سلطان إدريس عفيف الله شاه; born 8 February 1955) is a member of the Perak Royal Family who is the current Raja Di-Hilir (Deputy Crown Prince) of Perak. He is currently the second in the line of succession to the throne of the Malaysian state of Perak since 20 June 2014.

== Early life ==
Raja Iskandar Dzurkarnain was born on 8 February 1955 at Hospital Kuala Kangsar, Kuala Kangsar, Perak, Federation of Malaya. He is the son of Sultan Idris Shah II and Raja Muzwin.

== Education ==
Raja Iskandar Dzurkarnain was educated at Sekolah Menengah Kebangsaan Clifford, Kuala Kangsar. He continued his studies in London.

== Personal life ==
On August 24, 1986, he married Tunku Soraya, the adopted daughter cum niece (in the matrilineal line) of Almarhum Sultan Abdul Halim Muadzam Shah and Almarhumah Sultanah Bahiyah binti Tuanku Abdul Rahman. They have three sons and two daughters.

Name	Birth	Place of birth	Age
His Highness (Yang Mulia) Raja Nabil Imran Abdul Aziz	2 August 1987	Kedah	39 years, 3 months and 6 days
His Highness (Yang Mulia) Raja Idris Shah	18 July 1989	Kedah	37 years, 3 months and 21 days
Her Highness (Yang Mulia) Raja Sarina Intan Bahiyah	12 June 1992	Kedah	34 years, 4 months and 27 days
Her Highness (Yang Mulia) Raja Safia Azizah	5 June 1996	Kedah	30 years, 5 months and 3 days
His Highness (Yang Mulia) Raja Siffudin Muazzam Shah	18 November 2000	Kedah	25 years, 11 months and 21 days

== Styles and honours ==
Styles of Raja Iskandar Dzurkarnain
- Reference style: His Highness
- Spoken style: Your Highness
- Alternative style: Tuanku

The full title and style of Raja Iskandar Dzurkarnain is:

His Highness Raja Iskandar Dzurkarnain ibni Almarhum Sultan Idris A’fifullah Shah, D.K., D.K. II (Johor), D.K.A. II., P.S.M., S.P.C.M., S.S.D.K., Raja Di-Hilir of Perak

=== Honours of Perak ===
- Recipient of the Royal Family Order of Perak (DK) (27 August 2016)
- Member Second Class of the Azlanii Royal Family Order (DKA II) (2010)
- Knight Grand Commander of the Order of Cura Si Manja Kini (SPCM) – Dato' Seri (24 September 1983)
- Recipient of the Sultan Idris Shah II Installation Medal (26 October 1963)
- Recipient of the Sultan Azlan Shah Installation Medal (9 December 1985)
- Recipient of the Sultan Azlan Shah Silver Jubilee Medal (2009)
- Recipient of the Sultan Nazrin Shah Installation Medal (6 May 2015)

=== Honours of Malaysia ===
- Malaysia
  - Commander of the Order of Loyalty to the Crown of Malaysia (PSM) – Tan Sri (20 October 2016)
  - Recipient of the 14th Yang di-Pertuan Agong Installation Medal (11 April 2012)
  - Recipient of the 17th Yang di-Pertuan Agong Installation Medal (20 July 2024)
- Johor
  - Second Class of the Royal Family Order of Johor (DK II) (23 March 2017)
  - Recipient of Sultan Ibrahim Ismail Coronation Medal (23 March 2015)
- Kedah
  - Knight Grand Companion of the Order of Loyalty to the Royal House of Kedah (SSDK) – Dato' Seri (30 January 2000)
  - Recipient of the Sultan Abdul Halim Golden Jubilee Medal (15 July 2008)
  - Recipient of the Sultan Sallehuddin Installation Medal (22 October 2018)

Duli Yang Amat Mulia Raja Di-Hilir of Perak Darul Ridzuan Raja Iskandar Dzurkarnain Ibni Almarhum Sultan Idris Al-Mutawakkil Alallahi Shah II Istana Al-Ridhuan; Istana Firuz, Ipoh, Perak Born: 8 February 1955
Malaysian royalty
Lines of succession
Preceded by Raja Dato' Seri Izzuddin Shah Ibni Almarhum Sultan Idris Al-Mutawakkil Alallahi Shah II	Raja Kechil Besar of Perak; 10 March 2010 - 19 June 2014	Incumbent; Heir: Raja Azlan Muzzaffar Shah ibni Sultan Nazrin Muizzuddin Shah
Regnal titles
Preceded by Raja Jaafar bin Almarhum Raja Muda Musa	Raja Di-Hilir of Perak; Line of succession to the throne of Perak; 2nd position 20 June 2014 - present	Incumbent; Heir: Raja Azlan Muzzaffar Shah ibni Sultan Nazrin Muizzuddin Shah
