= Raja Permaisuri Tuanku Bainun =

Raja Permaisuri Agong from 1989 to 1994

Bainun بعينون

Queen consort of Malaysia
- Tenure: 26 April 1989 – 25 April 1994
- Installation: 18 September 1989
- Predecessor: Tengku Zanariah
- Successor: Tuanku Najihah

Raja Permaisuri of Perak
- Tenure: 3 February 1984 – 28 May 2014
- Installation: 9 December 1985
- Predecessor: Raja Muzwin (as Raja Perempuan)
- Successor: Tuanku Zara Salim
- Born: 7 November 1932 (age 94); Penang, British Malaya, Straits Settlements
- Spouse: Sultan Azlan Muhibbuddin Shah (m. 1955; died 2014)
- Issue: Sultan Nazrin Muizzuddin Shah; Raja Azureen; Raja Ashman Shah; Raja Eleena; Raja Yong Sofia
Names
- Bainun binti Mohd Ali
Regnal name
- Raja Permaisuri Tuanku Bainun
- Father: Mohd Ali bin Man
- Mother: Che Putih binti Abdullah
- Religion: Sunni Islam

Raja Permaisuri Tuanku Bainun (Jawi: راج ڤرمايسوري توانکو بعينون; born Bainun binti Mohd Ali; 7 November 1932) is the widow of Sultan Azlan Shah of Perak and the mother of the incumbent Sultan Nazrin Shah. She was the Raja Permaisuri (queen consort) of Perak from 1984 to 2014. She also served as the 9th Raja Permaisuri Agong (Queen of Malaysia) and was the first commoner ever to be installed as Queen of Malaysia. As a queen dowager, she is now styled as Yang Maha Mulia Raja Permaisuri Tuanku Bainun

== Background ==
Tuanku Bainun was born on 7 November 1932 in Penang in the Straits Settlements and received her early education at the St. George's Girls School, Penang. She was selected to further her studies at the prestigious Teachers' Training College, Kirkby, England from 1952 to 1954.

A year after returning from England, she married the future Sultan Azlan Muhibbuddin Shah of Perak on 9 December 1955. The Sultan was then a Magistrate in Kuala Lumpur, while Tuanku Bainun was teaching at her former school. She was a teacher for 22 years and has taught in various schools in Kuala Lumpur, Seremban, Raub, Taiping and Kuantan.

== Queen consort ==
Upon her husband's accession to the Perakian throne on 3 February 1984, she became the Raja Permaisuri of Perak with the honorific prefix of Tuanku before her given name. In Perak a queen consort of royal blood is known as a Raja Perempuan, while the title of Raja Permaisuri was reserved for commoner consorts. Her Royal Highness was officially proclaimed the Raja Permaisuri of Perak Darul Ridzuan on 9 December 1985 in a ceremony at the Istana Iskandariah in Kuala Kangsar.

Sultan Azlan Shah was elected as the ninth king of Malaysia and during the oath taking and signing ceremony on 26 April 1989, Tuanku Bainun was proclaimed Queen of Malaysia. She was the first commoner to become Queen of Malaysia. She was crowned Queen of Malaysia on 19 February 1988 a new throne made of silver that replaced the ancient wooden throne used by Malaysia's eight previous queens. They held these titles until the end of Azlan Shah's term on 25 April 1994.

She ceased to be Raja Permaisuri of Perak on 28 May 2014, after her husband died. She was succeeded a month later by her daughter in-law, Tuanku Zara Salim.

== Royal family ==
The royal couple had five children, two sons and three daughters. The eldest is Sultan Nazrin Muizzuddin Shah ibni Almarhum Sultan Azlan Muhibbuddin Shah, the current Sultan of Perak. The others are Raja Dato’ Seri Azureen Binti Almarhum Sultan Azlan Muhibbuddin Shah, Raja Dato’ Seri Ashman Shah Ibni Sultan Azlan Muhibbuddin Shah, Raja Dato' Seri Eleena Binti Almarhum Sultan Azlan Muhibbuddin Shah and Raja Dato' Seri Yong Sofia Binti Almarhum Sultan Azlan Muhibbuddin Shah.

== Orders and recognitions ==
She was awarded:

=== Honours of Perak ===
- Perak
  - Recipient of the Royal Family Order of Perak (DK)
  - Member First Class of the Azlanii Royal Family Order (DKA I) (2010)

=== Honours of Malaysia ===
- Malaysia
  - Recipient of the Order of the Crown of the Realm (DMN) (1989)
- Selangor
  - First Class of the Royal Family Order of Selangor (DK I) (11 December 2005)

=== Foreign Honours ===
- Japan
  - Grand Cordon of the Order of the Precious Crown (30 September 1991)
- Thailand
  - Grand Cross of the Order of Chula Chom Klao (September 1990)

=== Academic ===
- Fellow of Liverpool John Moores University

=== Places named after her ===
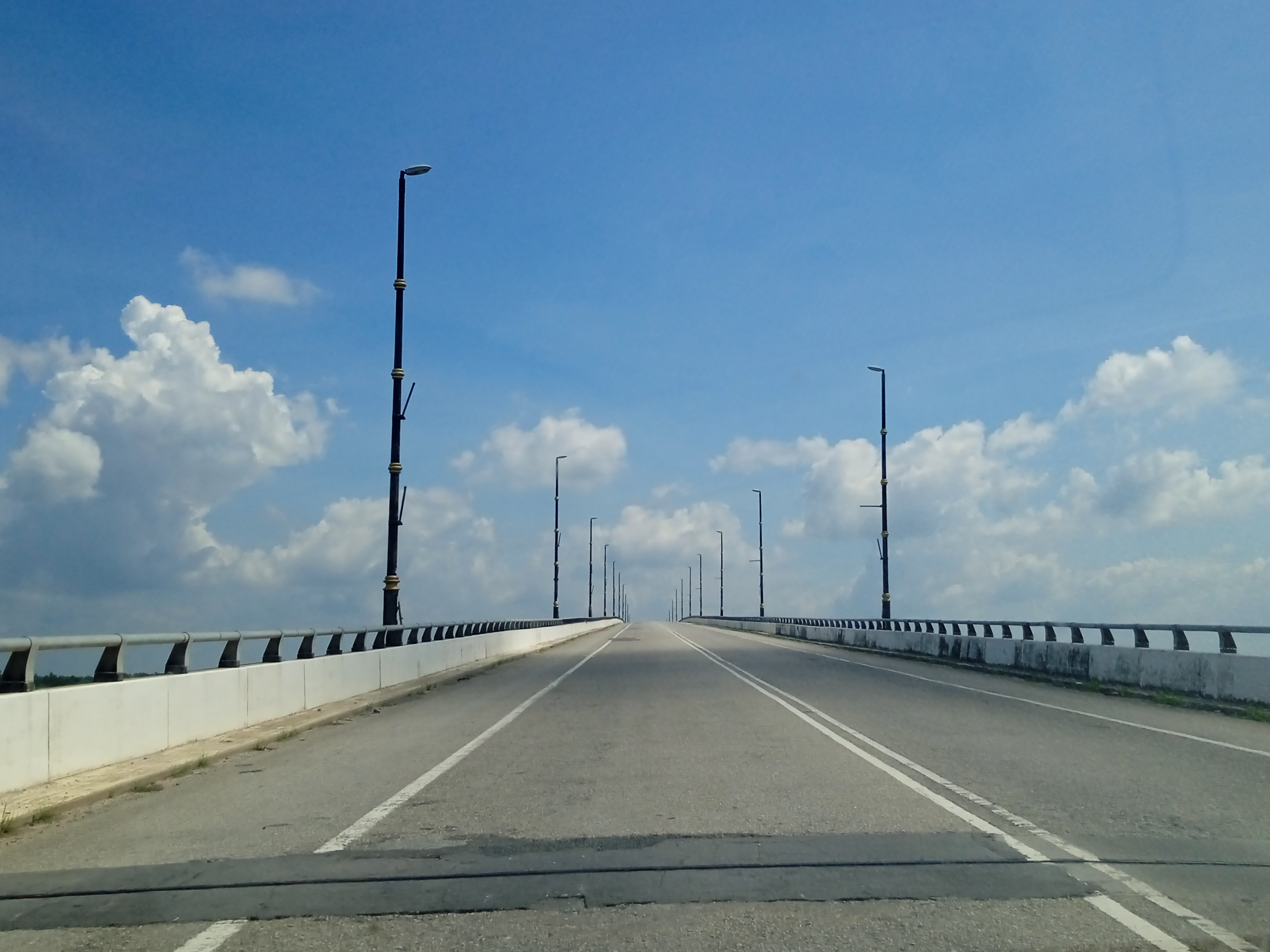
Raja Pemaisuri Bainun Bridge

Several places were named after her, including:

- Raja Pemaisuri Bainun Bridge in Lumut, Perak
- Raja Permaisuri Bainun Hospital in Ipoh, Perak
- Raja Permaisuri Bainun Mosque in Kuala Kangsar, Perak
- Jalan Raja Permaisuri Bainun in Ipoh, Perak
- Institut Pendidikan Guru Kampus Tuanku Bainun in Bukit Mertajam, Penang
- SMK Raja Permaisuri Bainun, a secondary school in Ipoh, Perak
- Tuanku Bainun Library in Universiti Pendidikan Sultan Idris, Tanjung Malim, Perak

== See also ==
- King of Malaysia
- Queen of Malaysia

Tuanku Bainun Royal House of Perak Born: 7 November 1932
Malaysian royalty
| Preceded by Raja Muzwin Binti Almarhum Raja Ariff Shah (as Raja Perempuan of Perak) | Raja Permaisuri of Perak (Consort of Sultan of Perak); 1984–2014 | Succeeded by Tuanku Zara Salim |
| Preceded by Tengku Zanariah (Sultanah of Johor) | Raja Permaisuri Agong (Queen of Malaysia) | Succeeded by Tunku Najihah (Tunku Ampuan of Negeri Sembilan) |
