= Azlan Shah of Perak =

King of Malaysia from 1989 to 1994

Azlan Shah: ازلن شاه
- Marhum Al-Maghfurlah (The Forgiven One)
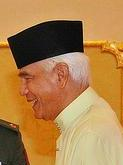
- Azlan Shah in 2008

King of Malaysia
- Reign: 26 April 1989 – 25 April 1994
- Installation: 18 September 1989
- Predecessor: Iskandar
- Successor: Ja'afar

Sultan of Perak
- Reign: 3 February 1984 – 28 May 2014
- Installation: 9 December 1985
- Predecessor: Idris Shah II
- Successor: Nazrin Shah

Lord President of the Supreme Court
- In office 12 November 1982 – 2 February 1984
- Nominated by: Mahathir Mohamad
- Appointed by: Ahmad Shah of Pahang
- Preceded by: Mohamed Suffian Mohamed Hashim
- Succeeded by: Salleh Abas
- Born: 19 April 1928; Batu Gajah, Perak, Federated Malay States
- Died: 28 May 2014 (aged 86); Kuala Lumpur, Malaysia
- Burial: 29 May 2014; Al-Ghufran Royal Mausoleum, Kuala Kangsar, Perak, Malaysia
- Spouse: Raja Permaisuri Tuanku Bainun (m. 1955)
- Issue: Sultan Nazrin Shah; Raja Azureen; Raja Ashman Shah; Raja Eleena; Raja Yong Sofia
Names
- Raja Azlan Shah ibni Raja Yussuff Shah
Regnal name
- Sultan Azlan Muhibbuddin Shah ibni Almarhum Sultan Yussuff Izzuddin Shah Ghafarullahu-lah
Posthumous name
- Almarhum Sultan Azlan Muhibbuddin Shah Al-Maghfur-Lah ibni Almarhum Sultan Yussuff Izzuddin Shah Ghafarullahu-lah
- House: House of Siak-Perak
- Father: Sultan Yussuff Izzuddin Shah ibni Almarhum Sultan Abdul Jalil Karamatullah Nasiruddin Mukhtaram Shah Radziallah Hu'an-hu
- Mother: Toh Puan Besar Hatijah binti Toh Indera Wangsa Ahmad
- Religion: Sunni Islam
Yang Amat Mulia Tun Raja Azlan Shah of Perak SSM DK (Perak) PMN PSM SPMP SPTS SIMP SPCM GCB KStJ
Personal details
- Education: Malay College Kuala Kangsar
- Alma mater: University of Nottingham (LLB)
- Occupation: Lawyer, judge
- Website: Galeri Sultan Azlan Shah

Azlan Muhibbuddin Shah ibni Almarhum Sultan Yussuff Izzuddin Shah Ghafarullahullah (Jawi: سلطان ازلن محب الدين شاه ابن المرحوم سلطان يوسف عز الدين شاه غفر ﷲ له; 19 April 1928 – 28 May 2014) was Sultan of Perak from 1984 until his death in 2014, the ninth Yang di-Pertuan Agong (King of Malaysia), from 1989 to 1994, and the 5th Lord President of the Supreme Court, from 1982 to 1984.

The child of a royal father and a commoner mother, he grew up in Perak, Malaysia. During school he played field hockey, subsequently playing for the Perakian team. He trained to be a lawyer in the United Kingdom. Upon returning to Malaysia, he soon became a judge and quickly rose through the legal ranks. In 1965, he became the youngest person appointed to the High Court of Malaya, and in 1982 he became the youngest ever Lord President of the Federal Court, the country's highest judicial rank.

He became Sultan of Perak in 1984 after the death of his first cousin once removed Sultan Idris Shah II. Subsequently, he was elected to be the Yang di-Pertuan Agong in 1989, serving a five-year term before returning to his post as Sultan of Perak. In 2009, he exercised his royal authority to prevent the dissolution of the Perak State Legislative Assembly, sparking a constitutional crisis. Ultimately, the legal system ruled that Sultan Azlan had acted properly.

During his career, Sultan Azlan Shah was awarded more than three dozen Malaysian and foreign honours. Dozens of buildings and other projects were named after him, including a genus of insects: Azlania. He was known as the "Father of Malaysian Hockey" for furthering field hockey at home and abroad and was the patron of dozens of organisations. With his wife Tuanku Bainun Binti Mohd Ali, Sultan Azlan had five children.

== Early life and education ==
He was born on 19 April 1928 at Kampung Manggis, Batu Gajah, Perak. The youngest son of Sultan Yussuf Izzuddin Shah (r. 1948–1963) by his second wife, Toh Puan Besar Hatijah binti Toh Indera Wangsa Ahmad (1906–1992), he was brought up by his mother outside of royal circles.

Raja Azlan Shah began his education at the Government English School, Batu Gajah Sekolah Menengah Kebangsaan Sultan Yussuf. For his secondary education, he attended Malay College Kuala Kangsar. Afterwards, he went to the University of Nottingham to study law, earning a Bachelor of Law degree in 1953. While in school, Azlan Shah began his lifelong love for field hockey, playing for his school teams. He subsequently played for the Perakian team.

== Legal career ==
Raja Azlan Shah was admitted to the English Bar on 23 November 1954. He returned to Malaysia, becoming the Assistant State Secretary of Perak. He joined the Judicial and Legal Service of the Federation of Malaya and soon became the President of the Sessions Court. He continued to rise quickly through the legal ranks, serving as Federal Counsel and Deputy Public Prosecutor, Legal Adviser of the State of Pahang, Registrar of the High Court of Malaya, and Chief Registrar of the Federal Court of Malaysia.

In 1965, Raja Azlan Shah, aged 37, became the youngest judge ever appointed to the High Court of Malaya. He was appointed to the Federal Court in 1973. In 1979, he was appointed Chief Justice of the High Court of Malaya. On 12 November 1982 he became the youngest ever Lord President of the Federal Court, the highest judicial post in Malaysia.

== Becoming Sultan ==
His path to becoming the Sultan of Perak started when his father appointed him as raja kechil bongsu on 19 August 1962, which made him the 6th and last in line to the throne. Due to the death of his father the following year, he moved up a rank to become the raja kechil tengah. On 1 January 1978, he moved up to raja kechil sulong and later that year, on 1 August, he moved up to raja kechil besar.

Raja Azlan Shah was installed Raja Muda (Crown Prince) of Perak by the then-Sultan of Perak, Sultan Idris Almutawakkil Alallahi Shah II on 1 July 1983. During the long reign of Idris Shah, most of Raja Azlan Shah's elder brothers had died. His only surviving elder brother, Raja Baharom Shah, refused the office of Crown Prince and Raja Azlan Shah was suddenly heir to the throne.

Within six months, Sultan Idris died and Azlan Shah ascended to the throne of Perak on 3 February 1984. He was officially installed as the 34th Sultan of Perak on 9 December 1985. In 1989, Sultan Azlan Shah was elected as the ninth Yang di-Pertuan Agong of Malaysia, as the Ruler of Perak was the last of the nine Malay Rulers of Malaysia who has not served as the Yang di-Pertuan Agong for its first cycle. After the five-year term ended, he returned to his post as Sultan of Perak in 1994.

Sultan Azlan Shah reigned for a total of 30 years and 114 days, the longest reign for a Sultan of Perak post-Malaysian independence, and the second longest reign in the history of the sultanate, behind only the 11th Sultan, Sultan Mahmud Iskandar Shah.

== Perak constitutional crisis ==
In 2009, the Pakatan Rakyat (PR) political group held a narrow majority in the Perak state assembly with 32 of the 59 seats. Three members of the party decided to leave and allied themselves with the rival Barisan Nasional (BN) coalition. PR leader Mohammad Nizar Jamaluddin requested to dissolve the state assembly. Sultan Azlan refused the request, citing royal discretion, and instead demanded Mohammad Nizar and the rest of the leadership resign their posts to make way for BN leaders.

The decision was challenged and the Kuala Lumpur High Court ruled that the Sultan was not constitutionally permitted to dismiss the menteri besar. However, upon appeal, the decision was reversed by the Court of Appeal which ruled that the Perak State Constitution gives absolute discretionary power for the Sultan to dissolve the State Legislative Assembly. The Court also directed Nizar to resign. The decision was subsequently upheld unanimously by the five-man Bench of the Federal Court in February 2010.

== Recognition ==
Sultan Azlan was the Pro-Chancellor of the Universiti Sains Malaysia from October 1971 to February 1981 and the Chancellor of the University of Malaya from February 1983 until his death. He also served as the Chairman of the Higher Education Advisory Council from 1974 to 1976. The University of Malaya awarded him an honorary doctorate in June 1979 and the University of Science of Malaysia awarded him one the following June.

Sultan Azlan was recognised by several foreign universities, including:

- University of Nottingham, Honorary Doctor of Law, July 1986
- Honourable Society of Lincoln's Inn, "Honorary Bencher", 1988
- Universitas Gajah Mada, Jogjakarta, Indonesia, Honorary Doctor of Law, 28 September 1990
- Universiti Brunei Darussalam, Honorary Doctor of Law, 30 October 1990
- Chulalongkorn University, Bangkok, Thailand, Honorary Doctor of Law, 19 December 1990.
- Royal College of Physicians of Ireland, Royal College of Surgeons in Ireland, Royal College of Surgeons of Edinburgh, Honorary Fellow, 2 October 1991
- Royal College of Surgeons of England, Honorary Fellow, 1999.

== Sports ==
Sultan Azlan was an avid supporter of field hockey throughout his life. Due to his significant contributions to the sport, he was known as the "Father of Malaysian Hockey." Azlan was President of the Malaysian Hockey Federation until 2005, and was the elected President of the Asian Hockey Federation from 1997 until his death. He was an Executive Board member of the International Hockey Federation, serving as vice-president for two terms starting in 1992. Under Azlan Shah's leadership, Malaysia twice hosted the World Cup, in 1975 and 2002. In 1983, the sultan founded the Sultan Azlan Shah Cup, an annual hockey tournament played in Ipoh.

Sultan Azlan enjoyed golfing in his spare time.

== Patron ==
Sultan Azlan was a patron of the following institutions:

- The Academy of Medicine of Malaysia
- The British Graduates Association of Malaysia
- The Iskandar Polo Club
- The Kuala Kangsar Golf Club
- The Lions Clubs
- The Malaysian Law Society in Great Britain and Éire
- The Malaysian Nature Society
- The Perak Veteran Hockey Association.
- The Rotary Clubs
- The Royal Ipoh Club and The Royal Perak Golf Club
- St. John Ambulance of Malaysia, State of Perak Darul Ridzuan

== Royal family ==
Sultan Azlan Shah married Bainun binti Mohd Ali on 9 December 1955. She is styled as Her Royal Highness The Raja Permaisuri (Queen Consort) of Perak, Tuanku Bainun Binti Mohd. Ali, D.K., D.M.N. The couple had five children, two sons and three daughters. The eldest is Raja Nazrin Shah, who is the current Sultan of Perak. The others are Raja Azureen, Raja Ashman Shah, Raja Eleena and Raja Yong Sofia. Raja Ashman Shah died on 30 March 2012 of an asthma attack.

== Death ==
Sultan Azlan Shah died on 28 May 2014 at 1:30 pm at the National Heart Institute, Kuala Lumpur at age 86. He was posthumously titled as Marhum Al-Maghfur-Lah. He was buried next to grave of the previous ruler, Sultan Idris Shah at the Al-Ghufran Royal Mausoleum at Ubudiah Mosque, Kuala Kangsar, Perak after Asar prayers on 29 May, and the proclamation of a new sultan was announced on 29 May. Upon his death, a public holiday was announced in the state of Perak for 29 May so that the population could pay their last respects to him at Kuala Kangsar. Menteri Besar of Perak Datuk Seri Zambry Abdul Kadir announced that the Malaysian flag would fly at half-mast for 7 days, and the Perakian flag for 100 days. In addition, "all entertainment and celebrations" were cancelled to show respect for the Sultan.

== Issue ==
Name	Birth Date	Birth Place	Death Date	Death Place	Marriage Date	Spouse	Their Children	Their Grandchildren
Sultan Nazrin Muizzuddin Shah	27 November 1956 (age 69)	George Town, Penang			17 May 2007	Tuanku Zara Salim	Raja Azlan Muzzaffar Shah (Raja Kechil Besar); Raja Nazira Safya	
Raja Dato' Seri Azureen	9 December 1957 (age 68)	Penang			8 September 1979	Dato' Seri Mohd Salleh Bin Dato' Ismail	Abdul Latiff; Azlin; Nurlin; Abdul Azim	Sharifah Nur Alara Budriah Jamalullail; Syed Azlan Salahuddin Putra Jamalullail; Sharifah Nur Zahra Hatijah Jamalullail; Sharifah Nur Ilana Bainunsafia Jamalullail
Raja Dato' Seri Ashman Shah	28 December 1958	George Town, Penang	30 March 2012 (aged 53)	No. 25, Jalan Setia Kasih 5, Bukit Damansara, Kuala Lumpur.	26 September 1991	Dato' Seri Noraini Jane Binti Tan Sri Kamarul Ariffin	Raja Eminah Alliyah; Raja Ahmad Nazim Azlan Shah (Raja Kechil Sulong); Raja Bainunisa Safia	
Raja Dato' Seri Eleena	3 April 1960 (age 66)	Penang			14 October 1991	Dato' Seri Ismail Farouk Bin Abdullah	Omar Azlan; Alia Azleena; Imran Azlan; Ashman Azlan; Sofia	
Raja Dato' Seri Yong Sofia	24 June 1961 (age 65)	Penang			5 December 1987	Tunku Dato' Seri Kamel Bin Tunku Rijaludin	Tunku Aznal Shahabudin; Tunku Khaira Shahabudin; Tunku Amira Shahabudin; Tunku Maisara Shahabudin	

== Literature ==
- Sinnadurai, Visu (1988). "His Majesty Sultan Azlan Shah: The Yang di-Pertuan Agong IX Malaysia". The Supreme Court Reports. Kuala Lumpur: The Supreme Court Journal. ISSN 0128-066X. (Special issue of the Supreme Court Journal to commemorate the installation of His Majesty Sultan Azlan Shah as the Yang di-Pertuan Agong IX Malaysia)

== Honours ==
=== Perak honours ===
- Recipient of the Royal Family Order of Perak (DK) (since 3 February 1984)
- Founding Grand Master of the Perak Family Order of Sultan Azlan Shah (2000)
- Founding Grand Master of the Azlanii Royal Family Order (2010)
- Knight Grand Commander and Grand Master (since 1984) of the Order of the Cura Si Manja Kini (SPCM) – Dato' Seri (1979)
- Knight Grand Commander and Grand Master (since 1984) of the Order of Taming Sari (SPTS) – Dato' Seri Panglima
- Knight Grand Commander and Grand Master (since 1984) of the Order of the Perak State Crown (SPMP) – Dato' Seri (15 September 1969)

=== Malaysian honours ===
- Recipient of the Malaysian Commemorative Medal (Silver) (PPM) (1965)
- Commander of the Order of Loyalty to the Crown of Malaysia (PSM) – Tan Sri (7 June 1972)
- Commander of the Order of the Defender of the Realm (PMN) – Tan Sri (1979)
- Grand Commander of the Order of Loyalty to the Crown of Malaysia (SSM) – Tun (1983)
- Recipient of the Order of the Crown of the Realm (DMN) (1987)
- Recipient of the Order of the Royal House of Malaysia (DKM) (1989)
- Grand Master (1989–1994) of the Order of Merit of Malaysia
- Grand Master (1989–1994) of the Order of the Royal Household of Malaysia
- Courageous Commander of the Most Gallant Order of Military Service (PGAT) (1989)

=== State honours ===
- Johor
  - First Class of the Royal Family Order of Johor (DK I)
- Kedah
  - Member of the Royal Family Order of Kedah (DK) (10 April 1986)
- Kelantan
  - Recipient of the Royal Family Order of Kelantan or Star of Yunus (DK)
- Negeri Sembilan
  - Member of the Royal Family Order of Negeri Sembilan (DKNS) (1989)
- Pahang
  - Member 1st class of the Family Order of the Crown of Indra of Pahang (DK I) (1996)
  - Grand Knight of the Order of the Crown of Pahang (SIMP) – formerly Dato', now Dato' Indera (1980)
- Perlis
  - Recipient of the Perlis Family Order of the Gallant Prince Syed Putra Jamalullail (DK)
- Selangor
  - First Class of the Royal Family Order of Selangor (DK I) (8 November 1985)
- Terengganu
  - Member first class of the Family Order of Terengganu (DK I) (6 July 1984)

=== Foreign honours ===
- Austria
  - Grand Star of the Decoration of Honour for Services to the Republic of Austria (08/04/1992)
- Brunei
  - Royal Family Order of the Crown of Brunei (DKMB, 15 July 1988)
- Chile
  - Grand Cross with Collar of the Order of the Merit of Chile (1992)
- Germany
  - Grand Cross Special Class of the Order of Merit of the Federal Republic of Germany (07/09/1992)
- Indonesia
  - Star of the Republic of Indonesia, 1st Class (09/1990)
- Japan
  - Collar of the Order of the Chrysanthemum (30 September 1991)
- Jordan
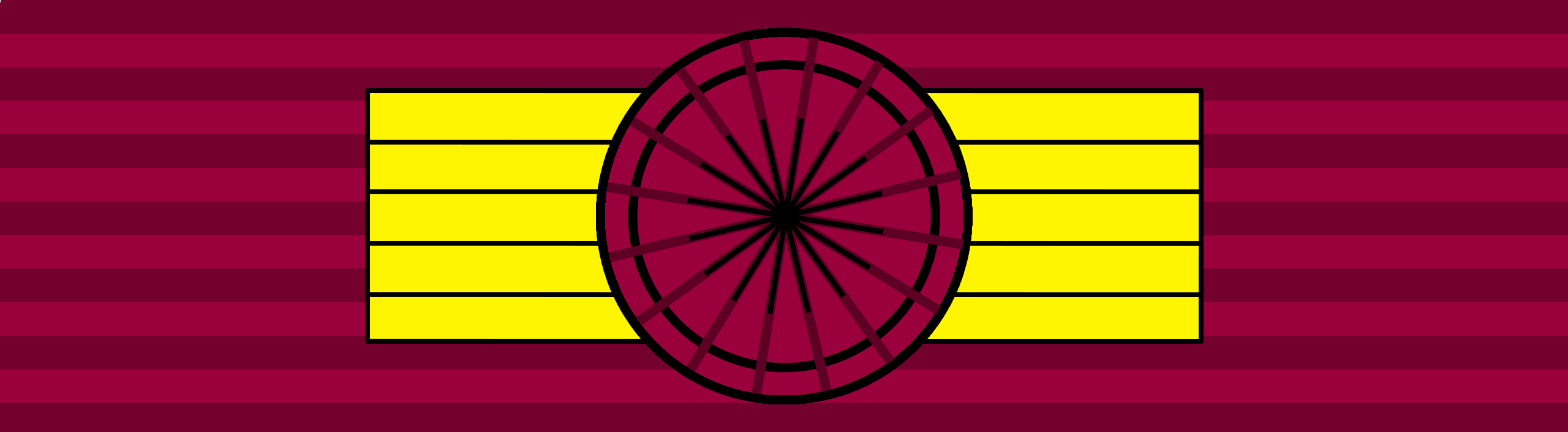
  - Collar of the Order of al-Hussein bin Ali
- Oman
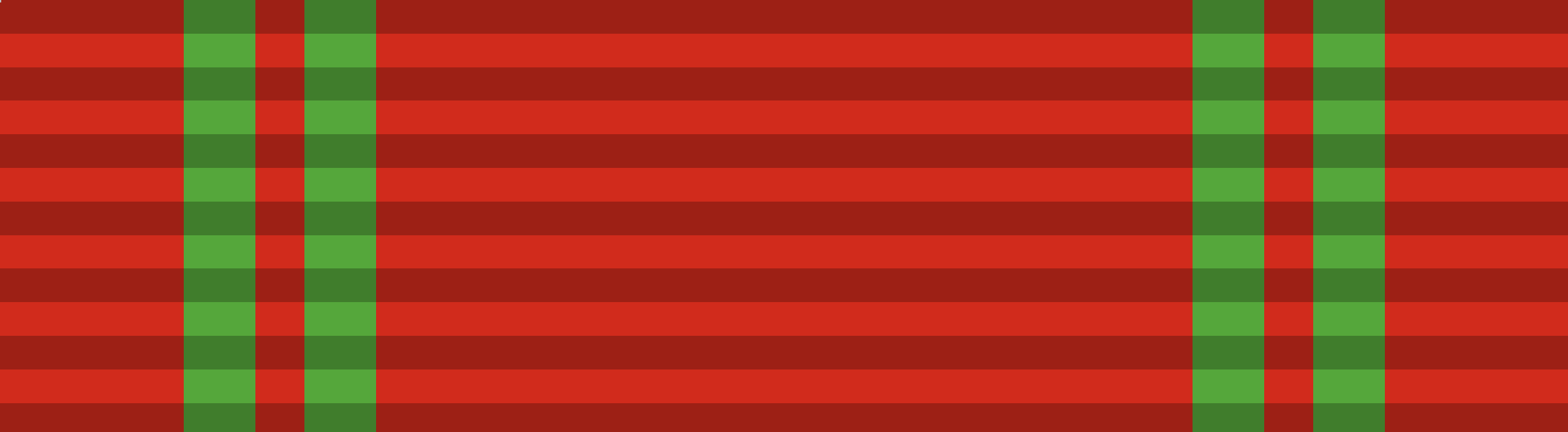
  - Collar of the Civil Order of Oman, 1st Class (04/12/1991)
- Saudi Arabia
  - Collar of Badr Chain (7.12.1991)
- South Korea
  - Grand Order of Mugunghwa (or Supreme Order of Hibiscus)
- Sudan
  - Collar of the Order of Honor of the Sudan (6 June 1991)
- United Kingdom
  - Honorary Knight Grand Cross of the Order of the Bath (GCB) Sir (14 October 1989)
  - Knight of The Order of Saint John (KStJ, 20 March 1990)
- Thailand
  - Collar of the Order of the Rajamitrabhorn (09/1990)

== Things named after him ==
=== Educational institutions ===
- SMK Sultan Azlan Shah, a secondary school in Lenggong, Perak
- SMK Agama Sultan Azlan Shah, a secondary school in Seri Iskandar, Perak
- Sekolah Menengah Sains Raja Tun Azlan Shah, a secondary school in Taiping, Perak
- Kolej Sains Kesihatan Bersekutu Sultan Azlan Shah, Ulu Kinta, Perak
- Kampus Sultan Azlan Shah, Universiti Pendidikan Sultan Idris (UPSI), Proton City, Tanjung Malim, Perak
- Politeknik Sultan Azlan Shah, Behrang, Perak
- Universiti Sultan Azlan Shah, Kuala Kangsar, Perak
- Maktab Rendah Sains MARA (MRSM) Sultan Azlan Shah, in Kuala Kangsar, Perak

=== Buildings ===
- Sultan Azlan Shah Gallery, a royal gallery in Kuala Kangsar, Perak
- Sultan Azlan Shah Airport, Ipoh, Perak
- Sultan Azlan Shah Hockey Stadium, Ipoh, Perak
- Sultan Azlan Shah Building, a Chancellery of the Universiti Malaya, Kuala Lumpur
- Sultan Azlan Shah Mosque, a mosque in Ipoh, Perak
- Muhibbuddin Shah Mosque, a mosque in Ipoh, Perak
- Sultan Azlan Shah Power Station, a power station in Manjung, Perak

=== Roads ===
- Jalan Sultan Azlan Shah, a major roads in Ipoh (formerly Tiger Lane), George Town, Penang and Kuala Lumpur (formerly Jalan Ipoh).
- Sultan Azlan Shah Bridge a bridge at the North–South Expressway Northern Route

=== Others ===
- Taman Rekreasi Sultan Azlan Shah (formerly Taman Polo), a recreational area in Ipoh
- Sultan Azlan Shah Cup, an international hockey tournament
- At the 1982 Perak Domestic Tourism Exposition, the orchid that won the best plant award was named after Azlan Shah, "Doritinopsis Sultan Azlan Shah".
- The insect genus Azlania was named in honour of him by The Malaysia Nature Society.

Regnal titles
Preceded by Iskandar of Johor (Sultan of Johor)	Yang di-Pertuan Agong (King of Malaysia); 1989–1994	Succeeded by Tuanku Ja'afar (Yang di-Pertuan Besar of Negeri Sembilan)
Preceded by Sultan Idris Iskandar Al-Mutawakkil Alallahi Shah II Ibni Almarhum Sultan Iskandar Shah Kaddasullah	Sultan of Perak; 1984–2014	Succeeded by Sultan Nazrin Muizzuddin Shah Ibni Almarhum Sultan Azlan Muhibbuddin Shah Al-Maghfullah
Government offices
Preceded by Mohamed Suffian Mohamed Hashim	Lord President of the Federal Court; 1982–1984	Succeeded by Mohamed Salleh Abas
