= Abdul Halim of Kedah =

King of Malaysia (1970–1975; 2011–2016)

Abdul Halim: عبدالحليم
- Al-Mu'tassimu Billah (He who seeks help from God)
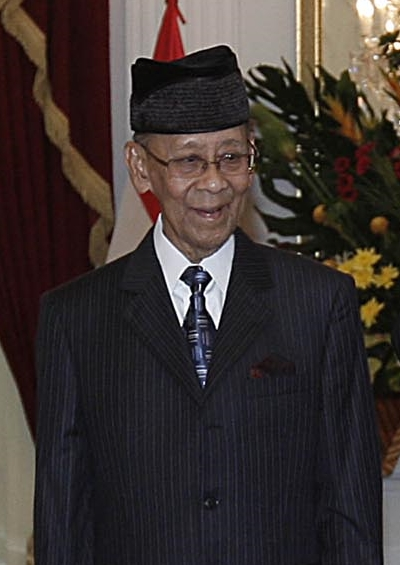
- Abdul Halim in 2012

King of Malaysia
- First reign: 21 September 1970 – 20 September 1975
- Installation: 20 February 1971
- Predecessor: Ismail Nasiruddin
- Successor: Yahya Petra
- Second reign: 13 December 2011 – 12 December 2016
- Installation: 11 April 2012
- Predecessor: Mizan Zainal Abidin
- Successor: Muhammad V

Sultan of Kedah
- Reign: 14 July 1958 – 11 September 2017
- Installation: 20 February 1959
- Predecessor: Badlishah
- Successor: Sallehuddin
- Born: 28 November 1927; Istana Anak Bukit, Kedah, Unfederated Malay States
- Died: 11 September 2017 (aged 89); Istana Anak Bukit, Kedah, Malaysia
- Burial: 12 September 2017; Langgar Royal Mausoleum, Alor Setar, Kedah, Malaysia
- Spouse: Sultanah Bahiyah (m. 1956; died 2003) Sultanah Haminah (m. 1975)
- Issue Detail: Tunku Puteri Intan Safinaz; Tunku Soraya (adopted); Tunku Sarina (adopted)
Names
- Tunku Abdul Halim ibni Tunku Badlishah
Regnal name
- Al-Sultan Al-Mu'tassimu Billahi Muhibbuddin Tuanku Al-Haj Abdul Halim Mu'adzam Shah ibni Almarhum Sultan Badlishah
- House: Mahawangsa
- Father: Sultan Badlishah Ibni Almarhum Sultan Abdul Hamid Halim Shah
- Mother: Tunku Sofiah binti Tunku Mahmud
- Religion: Sunni Islam

Al-Mu'tassimu Billahi Muhibbuddin Sultan Abdul Halim Mu'adzam Shah ibni Almarhum Sultan Badlishah (Jawi: المعتصم بالله محب الدين سلطان عبدالحليم معظم شاه ابن المرحوم سلطان بدلي شاه; 28 November 1927 – 11 September 2017) was Sultan of Kedah from 1958 until his death in 2017, and served twice as the King of Malaysia from 1970 to 1975 and from 2011 to 2016. He was the first and only ruler to reign as king twice, as well as the oldest elected to the office.

== Early life, education and early career ==
Abdul Halim was born at Istana Anak Bukit near Alor Setar as Tunku Abdul Halim ibni Tunku Badlishah, he was the second, but eldest surviving son, of Sultan Badlishah (1894–1958; reigned 1943–1958), who later became the 28th sultan of Kedah. Of Malay and Thai descent, his mother Tunku Sofiah binti Tunku Mahmud (born 29 April 1899), was a Kedah-born princess who died in an automobile accident on 28 February 1934. Abdul Halim's maternal grandfather, Tunku Mahmud, was once Raja Muda (heir presumptive) to the throne of Kedah.

He was educated at Alor Merah and Titi Gajah Malay schools and Sultan Abdul Hamid College in Alor Star between 1946 and 1948. He went on to Wadham College, Oxford and obtained a Diploma in Social Science and Public Administration. He subsequently joined the Kedah Administrative Service, serving in the Alor Star district office and later, the state treasury.

== Sultan of Kedah (1958–2017) ==
On 6 August 1949, Abdul Halim was appointed Raja Muda or heir apparent, and served as regent on 9 March 1957, while his father was abroad from 12 March to 3 July 1957. He acceded as the 28th sultan of Kedah upon his father's death on 14 July 1958, and was installed at the Balai Besar, Kota Star Palace in Alor Star on 20 February 1959, in a ceremony not held since 1710.

=== Silver jubilee celebrations ===
Abdul Halim celebrated his silver jubilee on 15 July 1983 with his royal consort, Sultanah Bahiyah. To commemorate the occasion the Kedah government opened Jubli Perak Park at Sungai Petani, Kedah's second largest town.

=== Golden jubilee celebrations ===
On 15 July 2008, Abdul Halim celebrated his golden jubilee as the Sultan of Kedah. He was the 4th sultan of Kedah in a line of 28 to reign for at least 50 years.

In conjunction with the golden jubilee, 15 July 2008 was declared a public holiday for the state of Kedah. A ceremony of handing over the contributions in conjunction with the golden jubilee was held at the Istana Anak Bukit on 6 July 2008 by Kedah Chief Minister Azizan Abdul Razak. Throughout the week of the golden jubilee, various events were held to commemorate the Sultan.

== Yang di-Pertuan Agong (1970–1975, 2011–2016) ==
=== First election as Deputy Yang di-Pertuan Agong ===
Abdul Halim served as Deputy Yang di-Pertuan Agong from 21 September 1965 to 20 September 1970.

=== First election as Yang di-Pertuan Agong ===
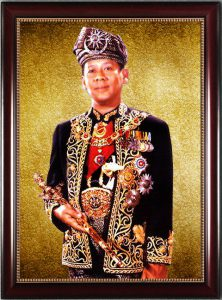
Official portrait of Abdul Halim as the 5th Yang di-Pertuan Agong

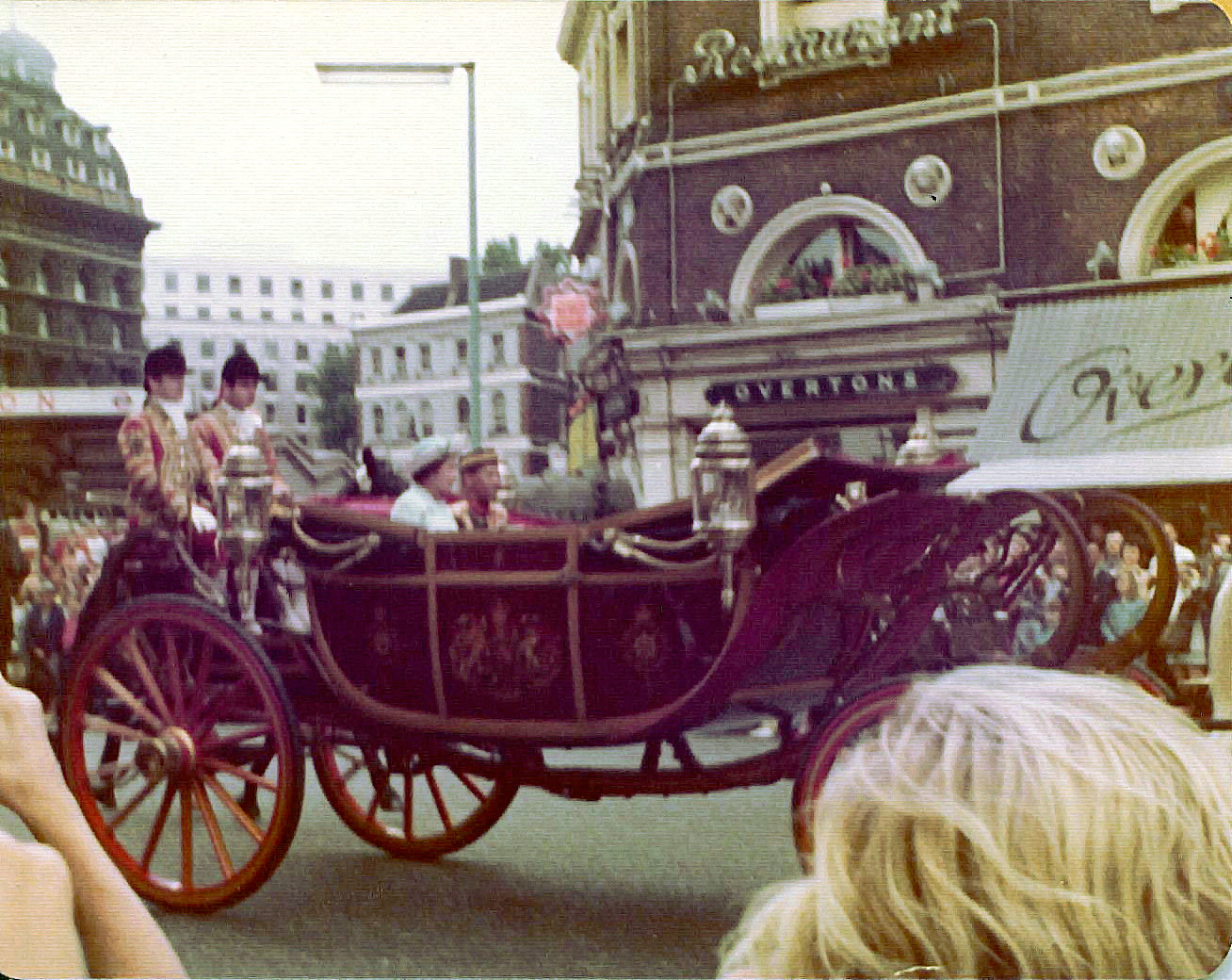
Abdul Halim in a carriage with Elizabeth II on a state visit to London, 1974.

In July 1970, Abdul Halim was elected as the 5th Yang di-Pertuan Agong of Malaysia and served from 21 September 1970 until 20 September 1975. He was the third youngest monarch to ascend the throne of the Yang di-Pertuan Agong after Putra of Perlis and Mizan Zainal Abidin of Terengganu.

During his kingship, Abdul Halim presided over the first transfer of power of the civilian government when his uncle, Prime Minister Tunku Abdul Rahman resigned in favour of his deputy Tun Abdul Razak. Tunku Abdul Rahman had felt that he should not serve under his nephew, given strict Malay royal protocol, but agreed to stay on as prime minister for one day of Abdul Halim's reign.

=== Second election as Deputy Yang di-Pertuan Agong ===
On 2 November 2006, Abdul Halim was elected for the second time to serve a five-year term as Deputy Yang di-Pertuan Agong. He was the first person to have been elected to this office twice.

=== Second election as Yang di-Pertuan Agong ===
In October 2011, Abdul Halim was elected to a second term as the Yang di-Pertuan Agong, which commenced on 13 December 2011. He was the first and only person to hold the position twice. He was also the oldest Malay Ruler to be installed as Yang di-Pertuan Agong at 84 years and 15 days old, surpassing the previous record holder, Salahuddin of Selangor, who was installed at 73 years and 49 days old. He was installed on 11 April 2012 at the Istana Negara.

During his tenure as Yang di-Pertuan Agong, a Council of Regency consisting of his brothers Tunku Annuar (d. May 2014), Tunku Sallehuddin, Tunku Abdul Hamid Thani, and daughter Tunku Puteri Intan Safinaz was assigned to discharge Abdul Halim's duties as Sultan of Kedah. His final tenure as Yang di-Pertuan Agong ended on 12 December 2016.

== Personal life ==
Abdul Halim had two wives:

1. Sultanah Bahiyah, the daughter of Abdul Rahman of Negeri Sembilan, married in 1956. She served as Sultanah of Kedah (1958–2003) and Raja Permaisuri Agong (1970–1975). She died on 26 August 2003 at the Istana Kuala Cegar in Alor Star. They had one daughter:

- Her Highness (Yang Teramat Mulia) Brigadier General Dato' Seri Diraja Tan Sri Tunku Puteri Intan Safinaz, the Tunku Temenggong of Kedah (previously the Tunku Panglima Besar of Kedah) (born 22 July 1966).

On 3 May 1960, they also adopted the twin daughters of his eldest sister, Tunku Hamidah, before the birth of their only child:

- Her Highness (Duli Yang Amat Mulia) Tunku Soraya, the Raja Puan Muda of Perak (born 30 April 1960).
- Her Highness (Yang Teramat Mulia) Tunku Sarina (30 April 1960 – 31 August 1991).

Through Tunku Soraya, who married Raja Iskandar Dzurkarnain, the son of Idris Al-Mutawakil Alallahi Shah of Perak and the Raja Di-Hilir of Perak (the second heir apparent of Perak), they gave him three grandsons and two granddaughters:

- His Highness (Yang Mulia) Raja Nabil Imran Aziz (born 1987)
- His Highness (Yang Mulia) Raja Idris Shah (born 1989)
- Her Highness (Yang Mulia) Raja Sarina Intan Bahiyah (born 1992)
- Her Highness (Yang Mulia) Raja Safia Azizah (born 1996)
- His Highness (Yang Mulia) Raja Siffudin Muadzam Shah (born 2000)

2. Sultanah Haminah, married in 1975. A commoner from Perak, she was titled Che Puan Kedah until 9 January 2004 when she was installed as sultanah. She served as Raja Permaisuri Agong during his second term as Yang di-Pertuan Agong.

== Issue ==
Name	Birth Date	Birth Place	Death Date	Death Place	Marriage Date	Spouse	Their children	Their grandchildren
HRH Tunku Soraya	30 April 1960		None	None	24 August 1986	DYAM Raja Iskandar Zulkarnain ibni Almarhum Sultan Idris Al-Mutawakkil Alallahi Shah II	HH Raja Nabil Imran; HH Raja Idris Shah; HH Raja Sarina Intan Bahiyah; HH Raja Safia Azizah; HH Raja Sifuddin Muadzam Shah	Raja Sarah Bahiyah; Raja Intan Soraya
HH Tunku Sarina	30 April 1960		31 August 1991	Kedah Royal Mausoleum	1984	HH Tunku Abdul Karim bin Tunku Ziauddin al-Haj	None	None
HH Tunku Puteri Intan Safinaz binti Almarhum Sultan Abdul Halim	22 July 1966		None	None	None	None	None	None

== Death ==
Sultan Abdul Halim died aged 89 at 2:30 pm on 11 September 2017 at the Istana Anak Bukit in Alor Setar, two months before his 90th birthday. He was laid to rest next to the grave of his late wife, Sultanah Bahiyah, at the Langgar Royal Mausoleum in Alor Setar, Kedah, on the day after his death.

== Military grades ==
Abdul Halim held the rank of Marshal of the Royal Malaysian Air Force in his previous constitutional duties as Commander-in-Chief of the Malaysian Armed Forces as well as the ranks of Field Marshal of the Malaysian Army and Admiral of the Fleet of the Royal Malaysian Navy. Since 1972 he was the Royal Malay Regiment's Colonel-in-Chief, and also performed the same functions for the Malaysian Army's Royal Service Corps.

== Awards and recognitions ==
=== National and State honours ===
- Kedah
  - Grand Master of the State of Kedah Star of Valour (since 15 July 1958)
  - Founding Grand Master and Member of the Royal Family Order of Kedah (since 21 February 1964)
  - Founding Grand Master and Member of the Halimi Family Order of Kedah (since January 1973)
  - Grand Master of the Kedah Supreme Order of Merit (since 15 July 1958)
  - Founding Grand Master of the Supreme Order of Sri Mahawangsa (since 2005)
  - Grand Master of the State of Kedah Star of Gallantry (since 15 July 1958)
  - Founding Grand Master and Knight Grand Commander (SPMK) of the Exalted Order of the Crown of Kedah (since 21 February 1964)
  - Founding Grand Master and Knight Grand Companion (SSDK) of the Order of Loyalty to the Royal House of Kedah (since 21 September 1973)
  - Founding Grand Master of the Order of Sultan Abdul Halim Muadzam Shah (since 2008)
  - Founding Grand Master and Knight Commander (DHMS) of the Order of Loyalty to Sultan Abdul Halim Muadzam Shah (since 15 July 1983)
  - Founding Grand Master of the Glorious Order of the Crown of Kedah (since January 2001)
- Malaysia (twice as Yang di-Pertuan Agong)
  - Recipient of Order of the Royal House of Malaysia (1970 & 2012)
  - Member (DMN, 1959) and Grand Master of the Order of the Crown of the Realm (1970–1975 & 2011–2016)
  - Grand Master of the Order of the Defender of the Realm (1970–1975 & 2011–2016)
  - Grand Master of the Order of Loyalty to the Crown of Malaysia (1970–1975 & 2011–2016)
  - Founding Grand Master of the Order of Merit (in 1975 & 2011–2016)
  - Grand Master of the Order of Meritorious Service (2011–2016)
  - Grand Master of the Order of Loyalty to the Royal Family of Malaysia (1970–1975 & 2011–2016)
- Johor
  - First Class of the Royal Family Order of Johor (DK I) (September 1983)
- Kelantan
  - Recipient of the Royal Family Order of Kelantan (DK) (July 1969)
- Negeri Sembilan
  - Member of the Royal Family Order of Negeri Sembilan (DKNS) (August 1982)
- Pahang
  - First Class Member of the Family Order of the Crown of Indra of Pahang (DK I) (14 July 1987)
- Perak
  - Member of the Royal Family Order of Perak (DK) (May 1986)
- Perlis
  - Member of the Perlis Family Order of the Gallant Prince Syed Putra Jamalullail (DK) (June 1980)
- Selangor
  - First Class Member of the Royal Family Order of Selangor (DK I) (1978)
- Terengganu
  - First Class Member of the Family Order of Terengganu (DK I) (1985)
- Malacca
  - Grand Commander of the Premier and Exalted Order of Malacca (DUNM) - Datuk Seri Utama
- Sarawak
  - Knight Grand Commander of the Order of the Star of Hornbill Sarawak (DP) - Datuk Patinggi (April 1977)

=== Foreign honours ===
- Brunei
  - Recipient of Royal Family Order of the Crown of Brunei (DKMB, 1 April 2002)
- Japan
  - Collar of the Order of the Chrysanthemum (1970)
  - Cordon of the Order of the Rising Sun
- Indonesia
  - First Class of the Star of Mahaputera (1970)
- Iran
  - Collar of the Order of Pahlavi (1971)
  - Commemorative Medal of the 2500th Anniversary of the founding of the Persian Empire (14 October 1971)
- United Kingdom
  - Associated Knight of the Venerable Order of St John (KStJ) (1972)
  - Honorary Knight Grand Cross of the Order of the Bath (GCB) -- Sir (1972)
- Thailand
  - Knight of the Most Auspicious Order of the Rajamitrabhorn (1 February 1973)
  - Knight of the Most Illustrious Order of the Royal House of Chakri (30 January 2013)
- Spain
  - Collar of the Order of Charles III (1974)
- Pakistan
  - First Class Recipient of Nishan-e-Pakistan (NPk) (1974)

=== Places named after him ===
Several places were named after him, including:

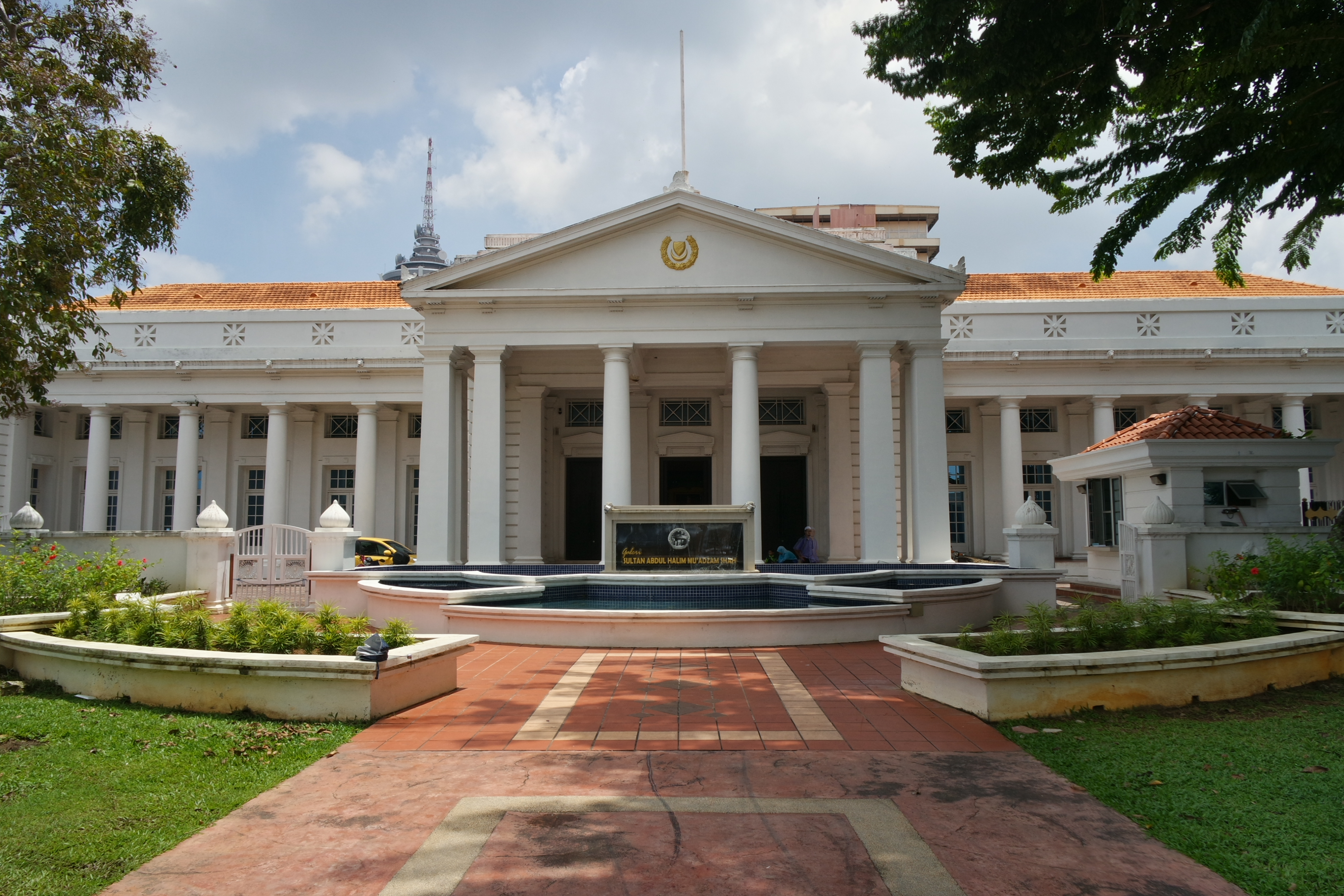
Sultan Abdul Halim Mu'adzam Shah Gallery

- Sultan Abdul Halim Highway in Alor Setar, Kedah
- Sultan Abdul Halim Mu'adzam Shah Gallery, a museum in Alor Setar, Kedah
- Sultan Abdul Halim Stadium in Alor Setar, Kedah
- SK Tunku Abdul Halim, a primary school in Alor Setar, Kedah
- Sultan Abdul Halim Ferry Terminal in Penang
- Sultan Abdul Halim Hospital in Sungai Petani, Kedah
- Sultan Abdul Halim Mosque in Sungai Petani, Kedah
- Institut Pendidikan Guru Kampus Sultan Abdul Halim in Sungai Petani, Kedah
- Sekolah Menengah Sultan Abdul Halim, a secondary school in Jitra, Kedah
- Sultan Abdul Halim Muadzam Shah Bridge, also known as the Penang Second Bridge, was named after him on 1 March 2014.
- Sultan Abdul Halim Airport in Kepala Batas, Kedah
- Politeknik Sultan Abdul Halim Mu'adzam Shah (POLIMAS) in Jitra, was also given in honour of his name.
- Jalan Tuanku Abdul Halim in Kuala Lumpur, formerly known as Jalan Duta
- Kompleks Penerangan & Penyiaran Sultan Abdul Halim in Alor Setar, Kedah
- Sultan Abdul Halim Mu'adzam Shah International Islamic University in Kuala Ketil, Kedah
- Kem Sultan Abdul Halim Muadzam Shah (formerly known as Kem Tok Jalai), a military camp in Jitra, Kedah
- Sultan Abdul Halim Mu'adzam Shah Football Cup

== Notes and references ==
Abdul Halim of Kedah House of Kedah Born: 28 November 1927 Died: 11 September 2017
Regnal titles
Preceded by Badlishah	Sultan of Kedah; 1958–2017	Succeeded by Sallehuddin
Preceded by Ismail Nasiruddin	Yang di-Pertuan Agong of Malaysia; 1970–1975	Succeeded by Yahya Petra
Preceded by Mizan Zainal Abidin	Yang di-Pertuan Agong of Malaysia; 2011–2016	Succeeded by Muhammad V
