= Nazrin Shah of Perak =

Sultan of Perak since 2014

Nazrin Shah: نسرين شاه
- Nazrin Shah in 2023

Deputy King of Malaysia
- Tenure: 13 December 2016 – present
- Monarch: Muhammad V Abdullah; Ibrahim

Sultan of Perak
- Reign: 29 May 2014 – present
- Installation: 6 May 2015
- Predecessor: Azlan Shah
- Crown Prince: Raja Jaafar
- Menteri Besar: See list: Zambry Abdul Kadir Ahmad Faizal Azumu Saarani Mohamad
- Born: 27 November 1956 (age 69) (Note: His birthday is celebrated on the first Friday of November); George Town, Penang, Federation of Malaya
- Spouse: Tuanku Zara Salim (m. 2007)
- Issue: Raja Azlan Muzzaffar Shah; Raja Nazira Safya
Names
- Raja Nazrin Shah ibni Raja Azlan Shah
Regnal name
- Sultan Nazrin Muizzuddin Shah ibni Almarhum Sultan Azlan Muhibbuddin Shah Al-Maghfur-Lah
- House: Siak-Perak
- Father: Sultan Azlan Muhibbuddin Shah
- Mother: Raja Permaisuri Tuanku Bainun
- Religion: Islam
- Education: Worcester College, Oxford (BA); Harvard University (MPA, PhD)

Sultan Nazrin Muizzuddin Shah ibni Almarhum Sultan Azlan Muhibbuddin Shah Al-Maghfur-Lah (Jawi: سلطان نسرين معز الدين شاه ابن المرحوم سلطان ازلن محب الدين شاه المغفور له; born 27 November 1956) is the current Deputy King of Malaysia and Sultan of Perak.

Nazrin Shah ascended the throne of Perak in 2014. As Sultan of Perak, he has been a strong advocate for education, Islamic moderation, and national unity. He has served as deputy king under Sultan Muhammad V of Kelantan (2016–2019), Sultan Abdullah of Pahang (2019–2024), and Sultan Ibrahim of Johor (2024–present).

== Early life ==
Sultan Nazrin Shah was born on 27 November 1956 in George Town, Penang, Malaya during the reign of his grandfather, Sultan Yussuf Izzuddin Shah. He is the eldest son of Sultan Azlan Shah and Raja Permaisuri Tuanku Bainun.

== Academic life ==
He studied at Sekolah Rendah Jalan Kuantan, Kuala Lumpur from 1962 to 1967, followed by lower secondary stage at St. John's Institution, Kuala Lumpur from 1968 to 1970, and furthered his upper secondary and sixth form at The Leys School, Cambridge (UK) until 1975.

Sultan Nazrin holds a B.A. in philosophy, politics and economics from Worcester College, Oxford. He also holds an M.P.A. from John F. Kennedy School of Government at Harvard University, and a Ph.D. in political economy and government, also from Harvard.

Sultan Nazrin's research interests are in the area of economic and political development in South-East and North-East Asia, historical national income accounting and economic growth in developing countries.

Sultan Nazrin has also written articles and spoken on a wide range of issues including the role of the constitutional monarchy in Malaysia, education, Islam, ethnic relations and economic development.

He has assumed the role of Financial Ambassador of the Malaysian International Islamic Financial Centre (MIFC), has been Chancellor of Universiti Malaya since 2014 and is the chairman of the Board of Governors of the Malay College Kuala Kangsar.

Sultan Nazrin is an honorary fellow at Worcester College, Oxford University; and Magdalene College and St. Edmund's College, University of Cambridge; trustee of Oxford Centre for Islamic Studies, Oxford University, Royal fellow of Malaysia Institute of Defense and Security (MIDAS); Royal fellow of Institute of Strategic and International Studies (ISIS) Malaysia, Royal fellow of Institute of Public Security Malaysia (IPSOM); and the Royal patron for Malaysia International Islamic Financial Centre.

He was conferred an honorary Masters of Business Administration by the Cranfield Institute of Technology, United Kingdom in 1993; an honorary Doctor of Economics by Soka University, Japan, in 1999; and an honorary degree by The University of Nottingham in 2016.

== Raja Muda of Perak ==
The Perak Sultanate does not practice agnatic primogeniture, so, when his father became the Sultan of Perak, he did not automatically become the Raja Muda, the heir apparent. Perak uses a hierarchy system, where the Sultan appoints princes of Perak to any vacant ranks. At that time, there were some vacancies of the six princes with titles ranks. On 16 February 1984, he was proclaimed as the Raja Kechil Besar of Perak, which made him 3rd in line to the throne. After the death of Raja Ahmad Saifuddin ibni Almarhum Sultan Iskandar Shah, the then-Raja Muda of Perak in 1987, the Raja Muda title was passed to him after the Raja Di-Hilir of Perak, Raja Ahmad Hisham ibni Raja Abdul Malik, who was 80, owing to old age, retained his title and refused promotion to being crown prince. He was proclaimed Raja Muda of Perak on 15 April 1987.

== Sultan of Perak ==
On 29 May 2014, he became the 35th Sultan of Perak on the death of his father, Sultan Azlan Shah. This marked the first time in almost a century that a father-son inheritance of the throne occurred in Perak. It also marked the first time in centuries that the Sultan of Perak was not born in Perak, as Sultan Nazrin was born in Penang.

He had previously been appointed as the Regent of Perak twice. The first time was when his father was elected as the ninth Yang di-Pertuan Agong, where he was regent for five years, from 26 April 1989 to 25 April 1994. When his father's health deteriorated in 2008, Sultan Nazrin served again as the Regent from 27 January 2008 until he ascended the throne and became the Sultan of Perak in 2014.

As the Sultan of Perak, Sultan Nazrin is the Chancellor of the University of Malaya—Malaysia’s oldest university. He is also the Colonel-in-Chief of the Malaysian Army's Royal Army Engineers Regiment and Royal Army Medical Corps.

== Deputy King of Malaysia ==
Sultan Nazrin was elected as the Deputy Yang di-Pertuan Agong of Malaysia in the 243rd Special Meeting of Conference of Rulers on 14 October 2016. The appointment took effect on 13 December 2016.

In the 251st Special Meeting of the Conference of Rulers, Al-Sultan Abdullah of Pahang was elected as the 16th Yang di-Pertuan Agong while Sultan Nazrin was re-elected as the Deputy Yang di-Pertuan Agong for a new 5-year term effective on 31 January 2019. His regency as acting king ended at midnight on 31 January 2019.

Sultan Nazrin was re-elected as the Deputy Yang di-Pertuan Agong in the 263rd Special Meeting of the Conference of Rulers. He works alongside the newly elected 17th Yang di-Pertuan Agong, Sultan Ibrahim of Johor, effective 31 January 2024.

=== Regency ===
On 2 November 2018, Sultan Nazrin was proclaimed as the acting Yang di-Pertuan Agong while Sultan Muhammad V was on medical leave. He ended his duties on 31 December 2018. However, due to the sudden abdication of Sultan Muhammad V as the 15th Yang di-Pertuan Agong on 6 January 2019, he again became the acting king the next day whilst the Conference of Rulers elected the 16th Yang di-Pertuan Agong on 24 January 2019 and during the subsequent swearing-in ceremony on 31 January 2019.

Sultan Nazrin performed the functions of the Yang di-Pertuan Agong when Al-Sultan Abdullah Ri'ayatuddin Al-Mustafa Billah Shah and Tunku Azizah Aminah Maimunah Iskandariah were away in the United Kingdom on a special visit from 17 September to 23 October 2021.

== Marriage and children ==
Sultan Nazrin married Tuanku Zara Salim Davidson at the Istana Iskandariah, Bukit Chandan on 17 May 2007. Sultan Nazrin and Tuanku Zara had known each other for eight years prior to the wedding.

The day after the wedding, there was a ceremony to bestow Tuanku Zara Salim with the official title of Raja Puan Besar (Crown Princess) of Perak. Sultan Nazrin's father also conferred the Darjah Kerabat Seri Paduka Sultan Azlan Shah Perak Yang Dihormati (Perak Family Order of Sultan Azlan Shah) on her.

The first child of the royal couple, Raja Azlan Muzzaffar Shah, was born on 14 March 2008, followed by Raja Nazira Safya, was born on 2 August 2011.

== Family ==
Sultan Nazrin is the eldest child of Sultan Azlan Shah and Tuanku Bainun binti Mohd Ali. His father once worked as a magistrate and his mother was a teacher. His siblings are:

- Raja Azureen (born 9 December 1957)
- Raja Ashman Shah (born 28 December 1958, died 30 March 2012)
- Raja Eleena (born 3 April 1960)
- Raja Yong Sofia (born 24 June 1961)

He has a son and a daughter:

- Raja Azlan Muzzaffar Shah, Raja Kecil Besar of Perak (born 14 March 2008)
- Raja Nazira Safya (born 2 August 2011)

== Bibliography ==
- Charting the Economy: Early 20th Century Malaya and Contemporary Malaysian (January 2017)
- Striving for Inclusive Development: From Pangkor to a Modern Malaysian State (July 2019)
- Globalization: Perak's Rise, Relative Decline, and Regeneration (July 2024)

== Titles and styles ==
Styles of Sultan Nazrin Shah
- Reference style: His Royal Highness
- Spoken style: Your Royal Highness
- Alternative style: Tuanku

Sultan Nazrin's full name and official title is in Malay: Duli Yang Maha Mulia Paduka Seri Sultan Nazrin Muizzuddin Shah Ibni Almarhum Sultan Azlan Muhibbuddin Shah Maghfur-Lah, D.K., D.K.S.A., D.K.A., D.M.N., D.K. (Kelantan), D.K. (Selangor), D.K.N.S. (Negeri Sembilan), D.K. (Perlis), D.K (Kedah), D.K. (Johor), D.K. (Pahang), PhD (Harvard), Sultan, Yang di-Pertuan dan Raja Pemerintah bagi Negeri Perak Darul Ridzuan dan Jajahan Takluknya

in English: His Royal Highness Sultan Nazrin Muizzuddin Shah, D.K., D.K.S.A., D.K.A., D.M.N., D.K. (Kelantan), D.K. (Selangor), D.K.N.S. (Negeri Sembilan), D.K. (Perlis), D.K. (Kedah), D.K. (Johor), D.K. (Pahang), PhD (Harvard), The Sultan, Sovereign Ruler and Head of the Government of Perak Darul Ridzuan and its dependencies

== Honours ==
He has been awarded:

=== Honours of Perak ===
- Grand Master (since 29 May 2014) and Recipient of the Royal Family Order of Perak (DK, 11 May 1987)
- Grand Master (since 29 May 2014) and Superior Class of the Perak Family Order of Sultan Azlan Shah (DKSA, 18 April 2005)
- Grand Master (since 29 May 2014) and Member First Class of the Azlanii Royal Family Order (DKA I, 3 February 2009)
- Founding Grand Master of the Perak Family Order of Sultan Nazrin Shah (since 26 November 2015)
- Grand Master (since 29 May 2014) and Knight Grand Companion of the Order of Cura Si Manja Kini (SPCM) – Dato' Seri (19 April 1985)
- Grand Master (since 29 May 2014) and Knight Grand Commander of the Order of Taming Sari (SPTS) – Dato' Seri Panglima (19 April 1989)
- Grand Master of the Order of the Perak State Crown (since 29 May 2014)
- Recipient of the Sultan Azlan Shah Installation Medal (9 December 1985)
- Recipient of the Sultan Azlan Shah Silver Jubilee Medal (2009)
- Recipient of the Sultan Nazrin Shah Installation Medal (6 May 2015)

=== Honours of Malaysia ===
- Malaysia
  - Recipient of the Order of the Crown of the Realm (DMN, 6 December 2014)
  - Recipient of the 9th Yang di-Pertuan Agong Installation Medal (18 September 1989)
  - Recipient of the 10th Yang di-Pertuan Agong Installation Medal (22 September 1994)
  - Recipient of the 12th Yang di-Pertuan Agong Installation Medal (25 April 2002)
  - Recipient of the 15th Yang di-Pertuan Agong Installation Medal (24 April 2017)
  - Recipient of the 16th Yang di-Pertuan Agong Installation Medal (30 July 2019)
  - Recipient of the 17th Yang di-Pertuan Agong Installation Medal (20 July 2024)
- Johor
  - First Class of the Royal Family Order of Johor (DK I, 26 February 2019)
- Kedah
  - Member of the Royal Family Order of Kedah (DK)
- Kelantan
  - Recipient of the Royal Family Order of Kelantan (DK, 20 January 2015)
- Negeri Sembilan
  - Member of the Royal Family Order of Negeri Sembilan (DKNS, 14 January 2015)
  - Recipient of the Tuanku Muhriz Installation Medal (26 October 2009)
- Pahang
  - Member 1st class of the Family Order of the Crown of Indra of Pahang (DK I, 28 November 2019)
- Perlis
  - Recipient of the Perlis Family Order of the Gallant Prince Syed Putra Jamalullail (DK, 17 May 2015)
  - Knight Grand Commander of the Order of the Crown of Perlis (SPMP) – Dato' Seri
  - Recipient of the Tuanku Syed Sirajuddin Jamalullail Installation Medal (7 May 2001)
  - Recipient of Tuanku Syed Sirajuddin Jamalullail Silver Jubilee Medal (2025)
- Selangor
  - First Class of the Royal Family Order of Selangor (DK I, 11 December 2014)
  - Second Class of the Royal Family Order of Selangor (DK II, 13 December 2003)
  - Recipient of the Sultan Sharafuddin Coronation Medal (8 March 2003)
- Terengganu
  - Recipient of the Sultan Mizan Zainal Abidin Coronation Medal (4 March 1999)

=== Honorary degrees ===
- United Kingdom
  - Honorary Masters of Business Administration from the Cranfield Institute of Technology - (1993)
  - Honorary degree from the University of Nottingham - (2016)
- Japan
  - Honorary Doctor of Economics from the Soka University - (1999)
- Malaysia
  - Honorary Doctorate in Islamic Finance from the International Centre for Education in Islamic Finance (INCEIF) University - (2019)

== Legacy ==
Several places were named after him, including:

- Raja Muda Nazrin Bridge in Lenggong, Perak
- Raja Dr. Nazrin Shah Mosque in Ipoh, Perak
- Raja Dr. Nazrin Shah Residential College, a residential college at University of Malaya, Kuala Lumpur
- Sekolah Menengah Raja Dr. Nazrin Shah, a secondary school in Perak Tengah, Perak
- Jalan Raja Dr. Nazrin Shah in Ipoh, Perak
- Kolej Perikanan Sultan Nazrin Muizzuddin Shah in Lumut, Perak
- The Sultan Nazrin Shah Centre in Worcester College, Oxford, UK
- Masjid Sultan Nazrin Muizzudin Shah in Tapah, Perak
- Sultan Nazrin Shah Bridge in Bagan Datuk, Perak
- The Sultan Nazrin Shah Room in the New Library, Magdalene College Cambridge
- Politeknik Maritim Sultan Nazrin Shah (PMSN) in Bagan Datuk, Perak
- Pusat Rehabilitasi PERKESO Sultan Nazrin Shah in Ipoh, Perak
- Sultan Nazrin Shah 69 Commando Camp in Ulu Kinta, Perak
