= Orders, decorations, and medals of Perak =

Honorific order of the Sultanate of Perak

The following is the orders, decorations, and medals given by Sultan of Perak. When applicable, post-nominal letters and non-hereditary titles are indicated.

== Order of precedence for the wearing of order insignias, decorations, and medals ==
Precedence:

1.	Darjah Kerabat DiRaja Yang Amat Dihormati	D.K.	--	Left shoulder
2.	Darjah Kerabat Seri Paduka Sultan Azlan Shah Perak Yang Amat DiHormati	D.K.S.A.	--	Left shoulder
3.	Darjah Kerabat Azlanii	D.K.A. I	--	Left shoulder
4.	Darjah Kerabat Azlanii II	D.K.A. II	--	Left shoulder
5.	Darjah Kebesaran Seri Paduka Sultan Azlan Shah Perak Yang Amat Dimulia	S.P.S.A.	Dato’ Seri Diraja
6.	Darjah Kebesaran Seri Paduka Sultan Nazrin Shah	S.P.S.N.	Dato’ Seri Diraja
7.	Darjah Seri Panglima Taming Sari	S.P.T.S.	Dato’ Seri Panglima
8.	Darjah Seri Paduka Cura Si Manja Kini	S.P.C.M.	Dato’ Seri
9.	Darjah Seri Paduka Mahkota Perak	S.P.M.P.	Dato’ Seri
11.	Darjah Dato' Pahlawan Taming Sari	D.P.T.S.	Dato’ Pahlawan
12.	Darjah Dato' Paduka Cura Si Manja Kini	D.P.C.M.	Dato’
13.	Darjah Dato' Paduka Mahkota Perak	D.P.M.P.	Dato’
14.	Darjah Paduka Cura Si Manja Kini	P.C.M.	--
	Pirwira (Paduka) Taming Sari	P.T.S.	--	abrogated in 1989
15.	Darjah Paduka Mahkota Perak	P.M.P.	--
16.	Darjah Ahli Cura Si Manja Kini	A.C.M.	--
17.	Darjah Ahli Mahkota Perak	A.M.P.	--
18.	Jaksa Pendamai	J.P.	--
	Hulubalang Taming Sari	H.T.S.	--	abrogated in 1989
	Kshatriya Taming Sari	K.T.S.	--	abrogated in 1989
	Perajurit (Ahli) Taming Sari	A.T.S.	--	abrogated in 1989
19.	Pingat Keberanian Handal	P.K.H.	--
20.	Pingat Pekerti Terpilih	P.P.T.	--
21.	Pingat Jasa Kebaktian	P.J.K.	--
22.	Pingat Lama Perkhidmatan	P.L.P.	--

== Orders, decorations, and medals ==
The Most Esteemed Royal Family Order of Perak - Darjah Kerabat Diraja Yang Amat Dihormati

- Founded by Sultan Yusuf Izzuddin Shah on 12 December 1957.
- Awarded in one class only, conferred on members of the Perak and foreign Royal houses - D.K.

The Most Esteemed Perak Family Order of Sultan Azlan Shah - Darjah Kerabat Sri Paduka Sultan Azlan Shah Perak Yang Amat Dihormati

- Founded by Sultan Azlan Shah in 2000. Conferred on members of the Perak and foreign Royal Houses and for distinguished services to the Sultan.
- Awarded in two classes :
  - a superior class - restricted to Royalty - Darjah Kerabat Sultan Azlan - D.K.S.A.
  - an ordinary class Datuk Sri Paduka Sultan Azlan - S.P.S.A.

The Most Esteemed Azlanii Royal Family Order - Darjah Yang Teramat Mulia Darjah Kerabat Azlanii

- Founded by Sultan Azlan Shah in 2009 and 2010.
- Awarded in three classes :
  - First Class - D.K.A. I (2010)
  - Second Class - D.K.A. II (2010)
  - Grand Companion - D.S.A. (2009)

The Most Illustrious Order of Cura Si Manja Kini - Darjah Yang Amat Mulia Cura Si Manja Kini

- Founded by Sultan Idris Shah II on 15 September 1969.
- Awarded in three classes and the fourth class was instituted on 19 April 1989 :
  - 1. Grand Commander - S.P.C.M.
  - 2. Commander - D.P.C.M.
  - 3. Officer - P.C.M.
  - 4. Member - A.C.M.

The Most Valliant Order of Taming Sari - Darjah Kebesaran Taming Sari Negeri Perak Yang Amat Perkasa

- Founded by Sultan Idris Shah II in 1977.
- Awarded to military and police personnel in six classes :
  - 1. Grand Commander - S.P.T.S.
  - 2. Commander - D.P.T.S.
  - 3. Companion - P.T.S.
  - 4. Warrior - H.T.S.
  - 5. Officer - K.T.S.
  - 6. Member - A.T.S.

The Most Illustrious Order of the Perak State Crown - Darjah Kebesaran Mahkota Negeri Perak Yang Amat Mulia

- Founded by Sultan Yusuf Izzuddin Shah on 12 December 1957.
- Awarded in four classes :
  - 1. Grand Commander - S.P.M.P.
  - 2. Commander - D.P.M.P.
  - 3. Officer - P.M.P.
  - 4. Member - A.M.P.

Conspicuous Gallantry Medal - Pingat Keberanian Handal

- Instituted by Sultan Yusuf Izzuddin Shah on 15 January 1951 as a reward for conspicuous gallantry and heroism.
- Awarded in a single class, originally a silver medal similar to the design of the P.P.T. but now a four-pointed enamelled star (P.K.H.).
- Bars may be awarded to signify subsequent acts of gallantry.

Distinguished Conduct Medal - Pingat Pekerti Terpilih

- Instituted by Sultan Yusuf Izzuddin Shah on 15 January 1951 to reward conspicuous bravery.
- Awarded in a single class, bronze medal - P.P.T.
- Bars may be awarded to signify subsequent acts of bravery.

Meritorious Service Medal - Pingat Jasa Kebaktian

- Instituted by Sultan Yusuf Izzuddin Shah on 15 January 1951 to reward meritorious public service in state employ.
- Awarded in a single class, bronze medal - P.J.K.

Long Service Medal - Pingat Lama Perkhidmatan

- Instituted by Sultan Idris Shah II on 15 September 1969 to reward long service in state employ of at least twenty-five years continuous duration.
- Awarded in a single class, bronze medal - P.L.P.

== Timeline of ribbons ==
Order	Class	1957-1969	1969-1977	1977-2000	2001–2010	2011–2013	Since 2014
Royal Family Order of Perak (1957)	D.K.						
Perak Family Order of Sultan Azlan Shah (2000)	D.K.S.A.	---					
Perak Family Order of Sultan Azlan Shah (2000)	S.P.S.A.	---					
Azlanii Royal Family Order (2010)	D.K.A. I	---					
Azlanii Royal Family Order (2010)	D.K.A. II	---					
Azlanii Royal Family Order (2010)	D.S.A.	---					
Order of Cura Si Manja Kini (1969, ACM 1989)	S.P.C.M.	---					
Order of Cura Si Manja Kini (1969, ACM 1989)	lower classes	---					
Order of Taming Sari (1977)	S.P.T.S.	---					
Order of Taming Sari (1977)	D.P.T.S.	---					
Order of Taming Sari (1977)	P.T.S.	---			---		
Order of Taming Sari (1977)	H.T.S.	---			---		
Order of Taming Sari (1977)	K.T.S.	---			---		
Order of Taming Sari (1977)	A.T.S.	---			---		
Order of the Perak State Crown (1957)	S.P.M.P.						
Order of the Perak State Crown (1957)	lower classes						

== See also ==
- Orders, decorations, and medals of the Malaysian states and federal territories#Perak
- List of post-nominal letters (Perak)
