= Maharaja Ajasath =

- Sinhala: මහරජ අජාසත්
- Directed by: Sanath Abeysekara
- Written by: Sanath Abeysekara
- Based on: Written chronicles
- Produced by: Sunil T. Films
- Starring: Jeevan Kumaratunga; Gayan Wikramathilake; Palitha Silva
- Cinematography: Sujith Nishantha
- Edited by: Ravindra Guruge
- Music by: Rohana Weerasinghe; Ranga Dassanayaka
- Release date: 21 August 2015
- Country: Sri Lanka
- Language: Sinhala

Maharaja Ajasath (Sinhala: මහරජ අජාසත්) is a 2015 Sri Lankan Sinhala epic biographical film directed by Sanath Abeysekara and produced by Sunil T. Fernando for Sunil T. Films. It stars Jeevan Kumaratunga, Gayan Wikramathilake, and Palitha Silva in lead roles along with Sabeetha Perera and Hashini Gonagala. Music co-composed by Rohana Weerasinghe and Ranga Dassanayaka. A special screening was taken place prior to original screening at Tharangani Cinema Hall, at National Film Corporation of Sri Lanka for Buddhist Monks.

The film reveals the story of King Ajasath (known as Ajatashatru or Kunik in India) who founded the Magadha Empire, North India during the period of Buddha. The film shows how he who caused the death of his father to achieve the throne later seek refuge in Dharma.

== Cast ==
- Jeevan Kumaratunga as King Bimbisara
- Sabeetha Perera as Kosala Devi
- Gayan Wikramathilake as Maharaja Ajasath
- Palitha Silva as Rev. Devadatta Thero
- Nadeeka Gunasekara as Kakawalli
- Hashini Gonagala as Princess Vajira
- Robin Fernando as Purohitha
- Rex Kodippili as Purohitha
- Roshan Ranawana as Sonu
- Cletus Mendis as Purohitha
- Wasantha Kumaravila as Maha Senavi
- G.R Perera as Mahamathya
- Menaka Maduwanthi as Badirawathi
- Geetha Kanthi Jayakody as Punna
- Gnananga Gunawardena
- Manel Chandralatha as Servant
- Rahal Bulathsinghala as Acharya

== Soundtrack ==
No.	Title	Lyrics	Singer(s)	Length
1.	"Epa Walapenna Ma Priya Devi"		Ishak Beg
2.	"Divya Dunnada Atharin"	Sanath Abeysekara	Shanika Madumali, Amila Perera
3.	"Kala Pawakdo Me Bawe"	Ve. Ellawala Medhananda Thero	Ishak Beg
4.	"Sath Pata Dalwa"	Sunil Dharmasena	Uresha Ravihari
