= Queen consort =

Wife of a reigning king

A queen consort is the wife of a reigning king, and usually shares her spouse's social rank and status. She holds the feminine equivalent of the king's monarchical titles and may be crowned and anointed, but historically she does not formally share the king's political and military powers, unless on occasion acting as regent. In polygynous societies, a (male) monarch has a principal or senior wife.

In contrast, a queen regnant is a female monarch who rules suo jure (Latin for, "in her own right") and usually becomes queen by inheriting the throne upon the death of the previous monarch.

A queen dowager is a widowed queen consort, and a queen mother is a queen dowager who is the mother of the reigning monarch.

== Titles ==
When a title other than king is held by the sovereign, his wife can be referred to by the feminine equivalent, such as princess consort or empress consort.

In monarchies where polygamy has been practised in the past (such as Morocco and Thailand), or is practised actively (such as the Zulu nation and the various Yoruba polities), the number of the king's wives and their status vary. In Morocco, King Mohammed VI has broken with tradition and given his wife, Lalla Salma, the title of princess; prior to his reign, the Moroccan monarchy had no such title. In Thailand, the king and queen must both be of royal descent; his other consorts need not be royal before marriage to him but are accorded royal titles that confer status. A Zulu chieftain designates one of his wives as "Great Wife", an equivalent to queen consort.

The situation is more complex in Yorubaland. All of a chief's consorts are essentially of equal rank. Although one wife, usually the one married to the chief for the longest time, may be given a chieftaincy of her own to highlight her relatively higher status compared to the other wives, she does not share her husband's ritual power as a chieftain. When a woman is to be vested with an authority similar to that of the chief, she is usually a lady courtier in his service who, although not married to him, is expected to lead his female subjects on his behalf.

In the Ottoman Empire, haseki sultan (Ottoman Turkish: حاصكي سلطان; Ḫāṣekī Sulṭān; Turkish pronunciation: [haseˈci suɫˈtaːn]) was the title held by the chief consort, and sometimes legal wife, of a sultan. The title was created in the 16th century for Hürrem Sultan, wife of Suleiman the Magnificent, replacing the previous title of baş hatun ("head hady"). The bearer of the title occupied the second most important position in the Ottoman Empire for a female after valide sultan ("empress mother").

While the wife of a king is usually given the title of queen, there is much less consistency for the husband of a reigning queen. The title of king consort is rare. Examples are Henry Stuart, Lord Darnley, in Scotland and Francisco de Asís, Duke of Cádiz, in Spain. Antoine of Bourbon-Vendôme in Navarre and Ferdinand of Saxe-Coburg-Gotha in Portugal also gained the title. In Portugal, because of the practice of jure uxoris, both King Ferdinand of Saxe-Coburg-Gotha and his predecessor, King Pedro of Portugal, were treated as ruling kings in protocol and were thus symbolically co-rulers with their wives, but both really had only the same power of a consort and the queen was the real ruler.

The title of prince consort for the husband of a reigning queen is more common. The monarchies that adopted this title did so because the title of king is usually historically higher than queen, so when the sovereign is female, her husband should never have a higher title than her. An example is Prince Albert of Saxe-Coburg and Gotha. He married Queen Victoria of the United Kingdom; because she insisted that he be given a title identifying his status, he became Albert, Prince Consort.

== Role ==
The traditional historiography on queenship has created an image of a queen who is a king's "helpmate" and provider of heirs. They had power within the royal household and partially within the court. Their duty was running the royal household smoothly, such as directing the children's education, supervising the staff, and managing the private royal treasury. They unofficially acted as hostesses, ensuring the royal family was not involved in scandals and giving gifts to high-ranking officials in a society where this was important to maintain bonds. As a result, consorts were expected to act as wise, loyal, and chaste women.

Some royal consorts of foreign origin have served as cultural transmitters. Due to their unique position of being reared in one culture and then, when very young, promised into marriage in another land with a different culture, they have served as a cultural bridge between nations. Based on their journals, diaries, and other autobiographical or historical accounts, some exchanged and introduced new forms of art, music, religion, and fashion.

However, the consorts of monarchs have no official political power per se, even when their position is constitutionally or statutorily recognized. They often held an informal sort of power dependent on the opportunities afforded to them. Should a queen consort have had an amiable personality and high intelligence, produced a healthy heir, and gained the favor of the court, then chances were higher she would gain more power over time. Many royal consorts have been shrewd or ambitious stateswomen and, usually (but not always) unofficially, among the monarch's most trusted advisors. In some cases, the royal consort has been the chief power behind her husband's throne, e.g., Maria Luisa of Parma, wife of Charles IV of Spain. At other times the consort of a deceased monarch (the dowager queen or queen mother) has served as regent if her child, the successor to the throne, was still a minor:

- Queen Regent Anne of Kiev, mother of Philip I of France
- Queen Regent Jeonghui, grandmother of King Seongjong of Korea
- Queen Regent Munjeong, mother of King Myeongjong of Korea
- Queen Regent Sunwon, grandmother of King Heonjong of Korea
- Grand Princess Regent Olga of Kiev, mother of Sviatoslav I of Kiev
- Grand Princess Regent Elena Glinskaya, mother of Ivan IV of Russia
- Queen Regent Mary of Guise, mother of Mary, Queen of Scots
- Queen Regent Catherine of Austria, grandmother of King Sebastian of Portugal
- Queen Regent Marie de' Medici, mother of Louis XIII of France
- Queen Regent Anne, mother of Louis XIV of France
- Queen Regent Luisa de Guzmán, mother of Afonso VI of Portugal
- Rani Lakshmi Bai, mother of Raja Damodar Rao of Jhansi
- Queen Regent Maria Christina of Austria, mother of Alfonso XIII of Spain
- Queen Regent Emma of Waldeck and Pyrmont, mother of Queen Wilhelmina of the Netherlands
- Queen Regent Anna Khanum, mother of Abbas II of Persia
- Queen Regent Helen of Greece, mother of Michael I of Romania

Similarly, in several cases in Siam (now Thailand) the queen consort was named regent during an extended absence of the king:

- Queen Regent Saovabha Phongsri, wife of King Chulalongkorn of Siam, served as Regent during his tour of Europe
- Queen Regent Sirikit, wife of King Bhumibol Adulyadej of Thailand, served as Regent during her husband's extended retreat

== Examples of queens and empresses consort ==
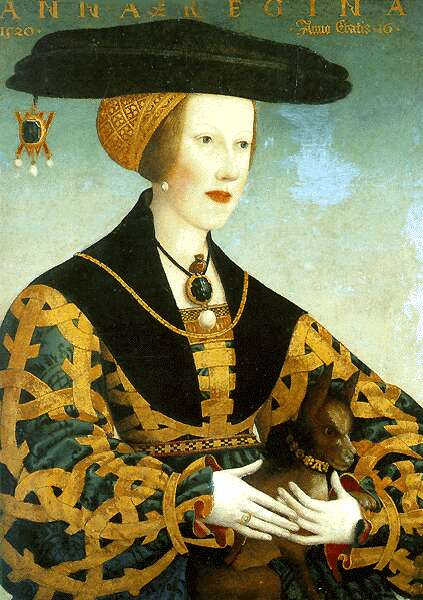
Anne of Bohemia and Hungary, consort of Ferdinand I, Holy Roman Emperor

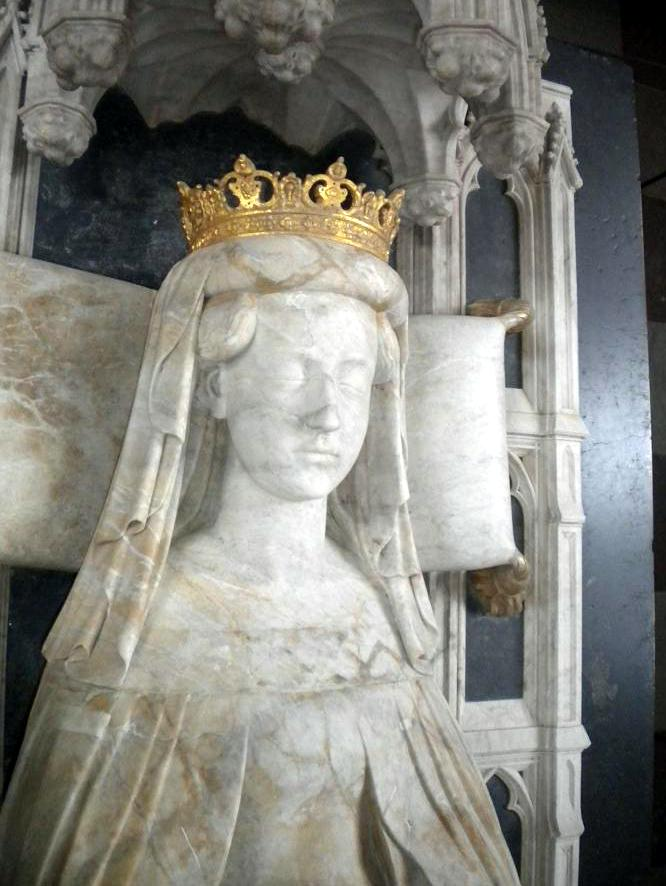
Margaret I of Denmark (1353–1412), was first the consort of King Haakon of Norway and Sweden and later ruled Denmark, Norway and Sweden in her own right

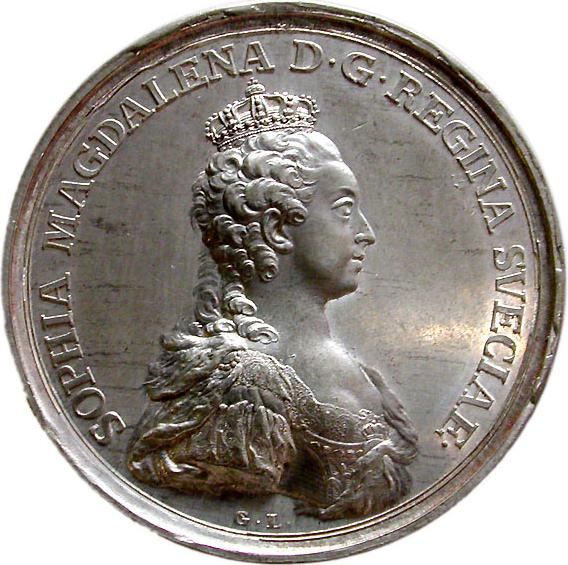
Queen Sophia Magdalene wearing the crown of the Queen of Sweden.

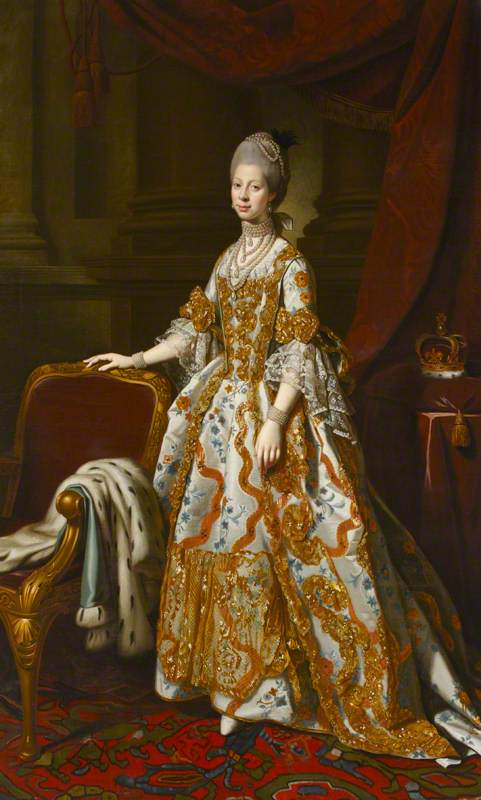
Portrait of Queen Charlotte by Nathaniel Dance-Holland, 1769

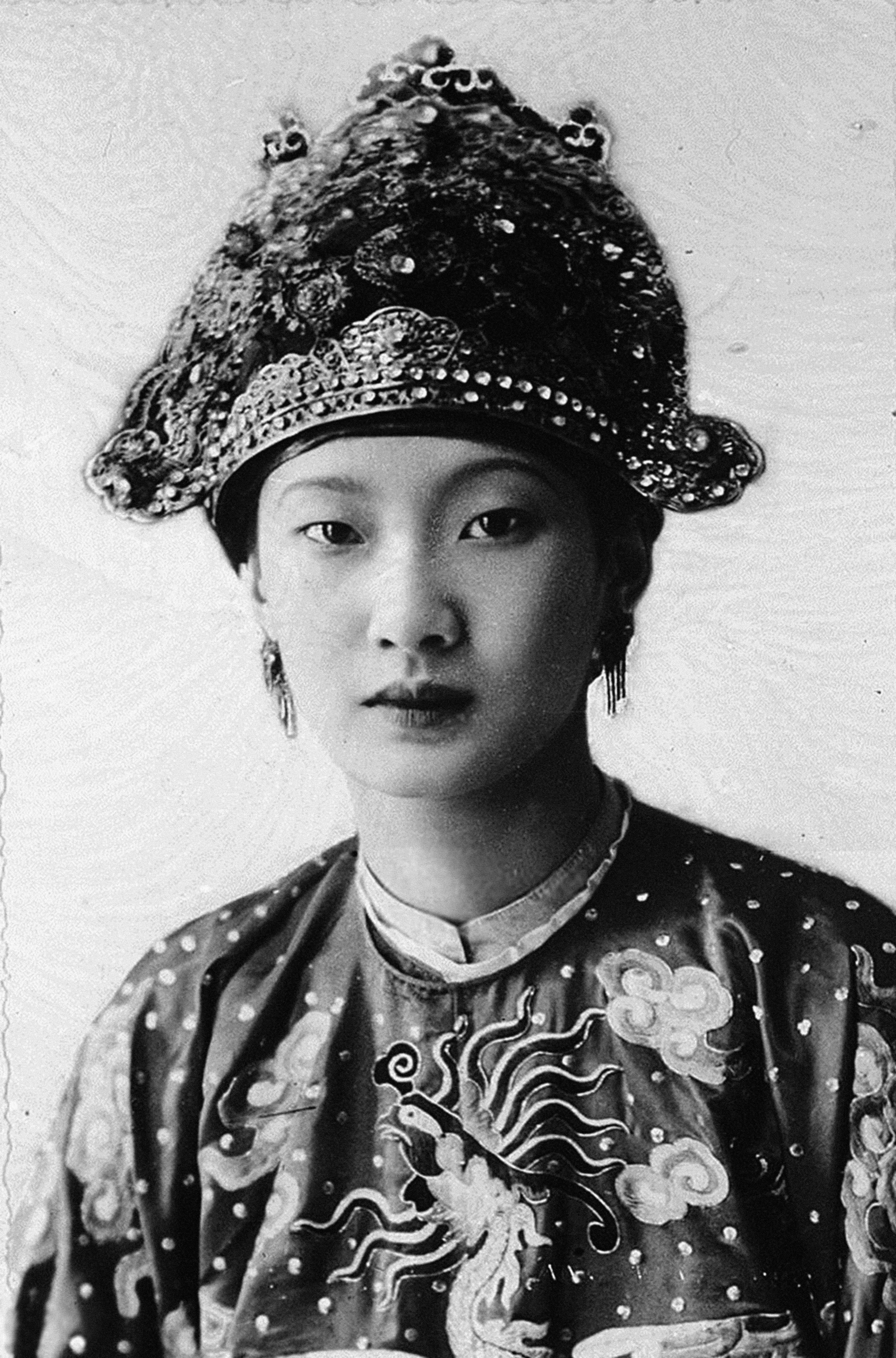
Empress Nam Phương on her wedding day, 1934. Royal portrait by unknown Nguyen Dynasty photographer, taken as a wedding photo of Nam Phương and was widely used right after in French Indochina

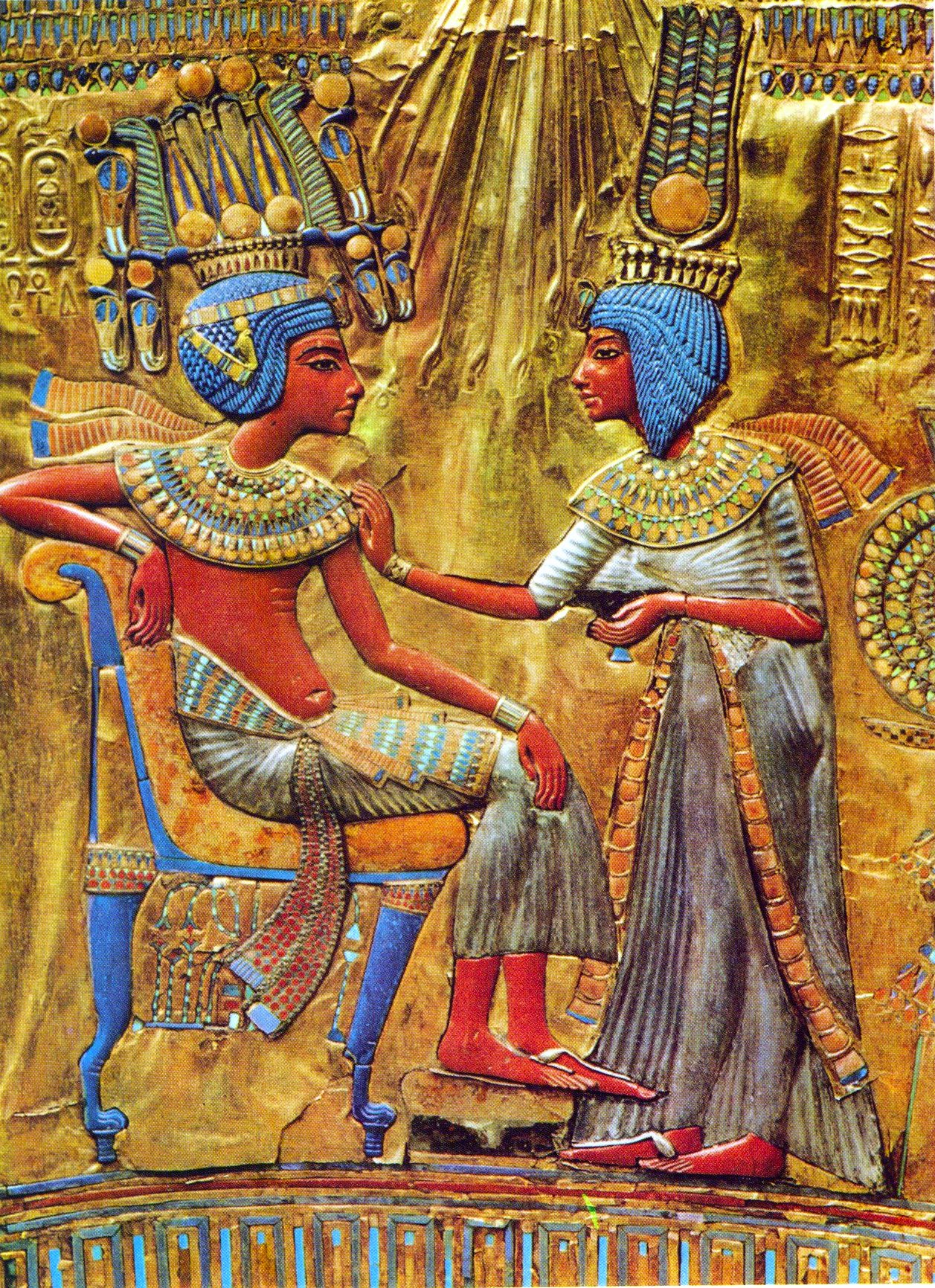
Egyptian pharaoh Tutankhamun married his half-sister Ankhesenamun

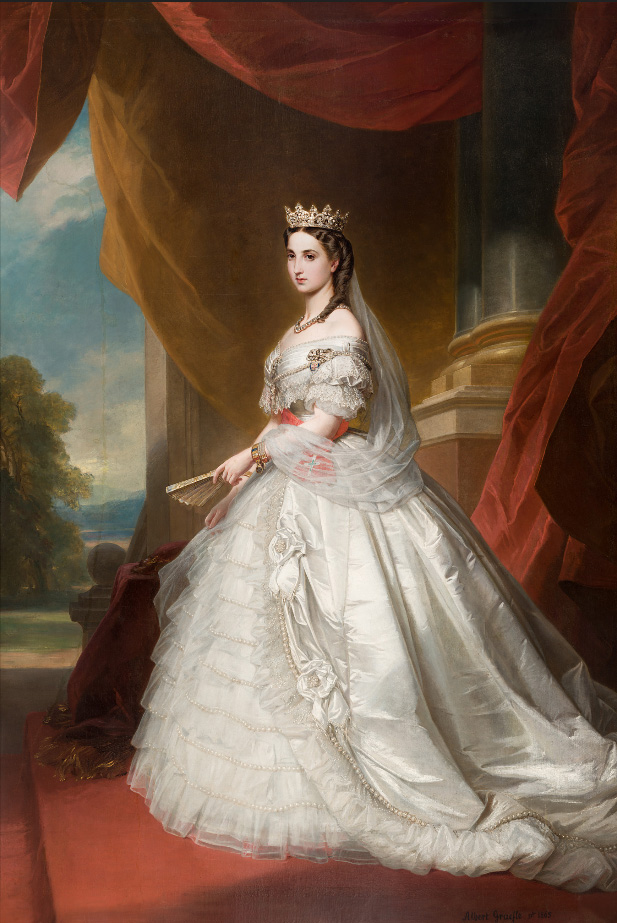
Empress Carlota of Mexico as a regent was the first woman to rule in the Americas.

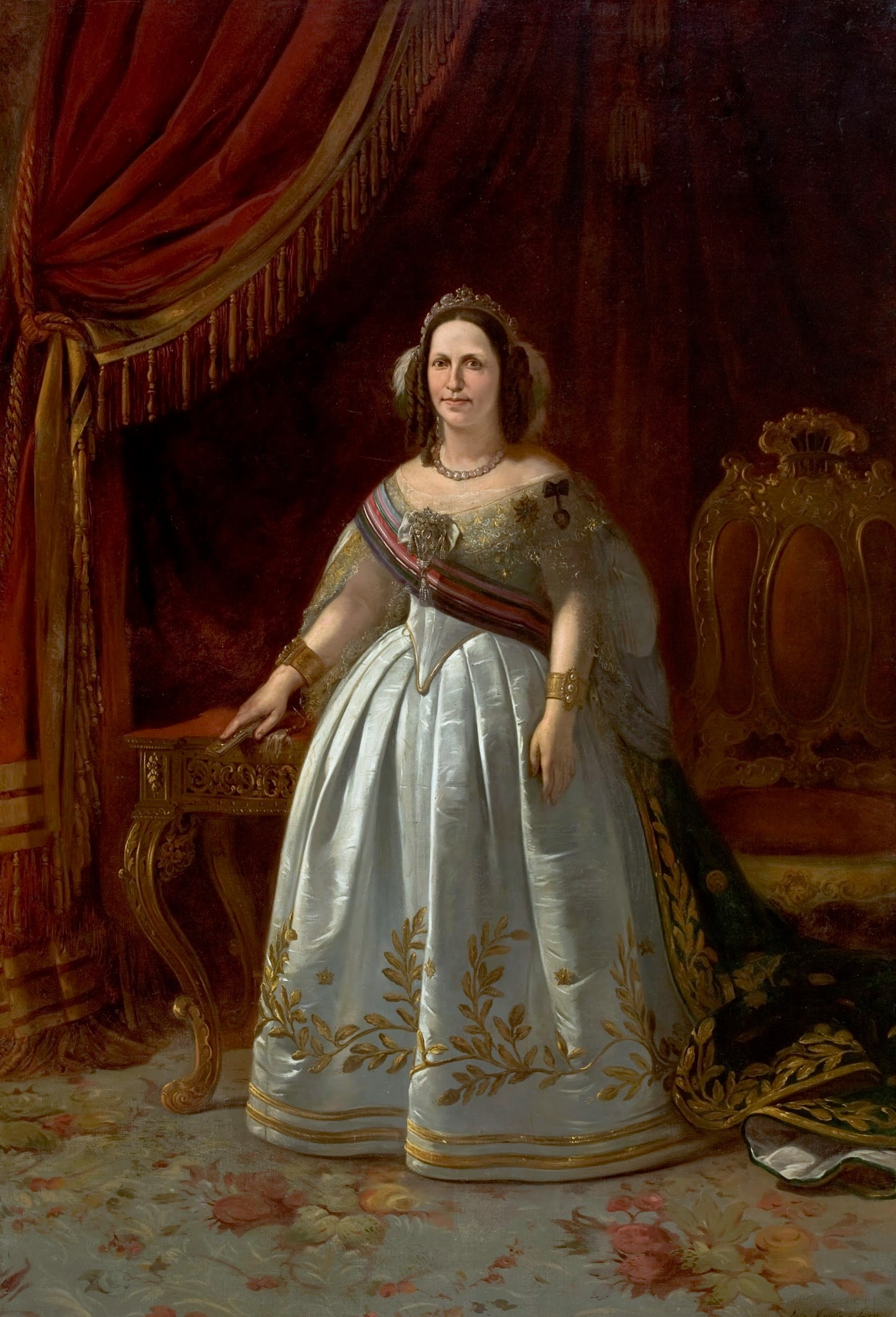
Teresa Cristina, Empress consort of Brazil

Past queens consort

- Queen Sindeok, consort of Taejo of Joseon
- Queen Jeongan, consort of Jeongjong of Joseon
- Queen Wongyeong, consort of Taejong of Joseon
- Queen Soheon, consort of Sejong the Great of Joseon
- Queen Jeongsun, consort of Danjong of Joseon
- Queen Inseong, consort of Injong of Joseon
- Queen Uiin, first consort of Seonjo of Joseon
- Queen Inmok, second of Seonjo of Joseon
- Queen Inyeol, first consort of Injo of Joseon
- Queen Jangnyeol, second consort of Injo of Joseon
- Queen Inseon, consort of Hyojong of Joseon
- Queen Myeongseong, consort of Hyeonjong of Joseon
- Queen Ingyeong, first consort of Sukjong of Joseon
- Queen Jang, principal consort of Sukjong of Joseon. Demoted back in 1694 to the rank of hui-bin, Royal Noble Consort Joseon rank 1
- Queen Jeongseong, first consort of Yeongjo of Joseon
- Queen Hyoui, consort of Jeongjo of Joseon
- Queen Hyohyeon, first consort Heonjong of Joseon
- Queen Maria Theresa, consort of Louis XIV of France
- Queen Marie Leszczyńska, consort of Louis XV of France
- Queen Marie Antoinette, consort of Louis XVI of France
- Queen Caroline, consort of George II
- Queen Charlotte was George III's consort for 57 years, 70 days, between 1761 and 1818, making her Britain's longest-tenured queen consort.
- Queen Caroline, consort of George IV
- Queen Adelaide, consort of William IV
- Queen Alexandra, consort of Edward VII
- Queen Mary, consort of George V
- Queen Elizabeth, consort of George VI
- Queen Nguyễn Hữu Thị Lan, consort of Bảo Đại
- Queen Victoria, consort of Gustaf V of Sweden
- Queen Louise, consort of Gustaf VI Adolf of Sweden
- Queen Louise, consort of Christian IX of Denmark
- Queen Louise, consort of Frederick VIII of Denmark
- Queen Alexandrine, consort Christian X of Denmark
- Queen Ingrid, consort of Frederik IX of Denmark
- Queen Louise, consort of Leopold I of Belgium
- Queen Marie, consort of Leopold II of Belgium
- Queen Elisabeth, consort of Albert I of Belgium
- Queen Astrid, consort of Leopold III of Belgium
- Queen Fabiola, consort of Baudouin of Belgium
- Queen Paola, consort of Albert II of Belgium
- Queen Sofía, consort of Juan Carlos I of Spain
- Queen Anne Marie, consort of Constantine II of Greece
- Queen Geraldine, consort of Zog I of Albania
- Queen Marie José, consort of Umberto II of Italy
- Queen Kapiolani, consort of King Kalākaua of Hawaiʻi
- Queen Soraya Tarzi, principal consort of King Amanullah Khan of Afghanistan
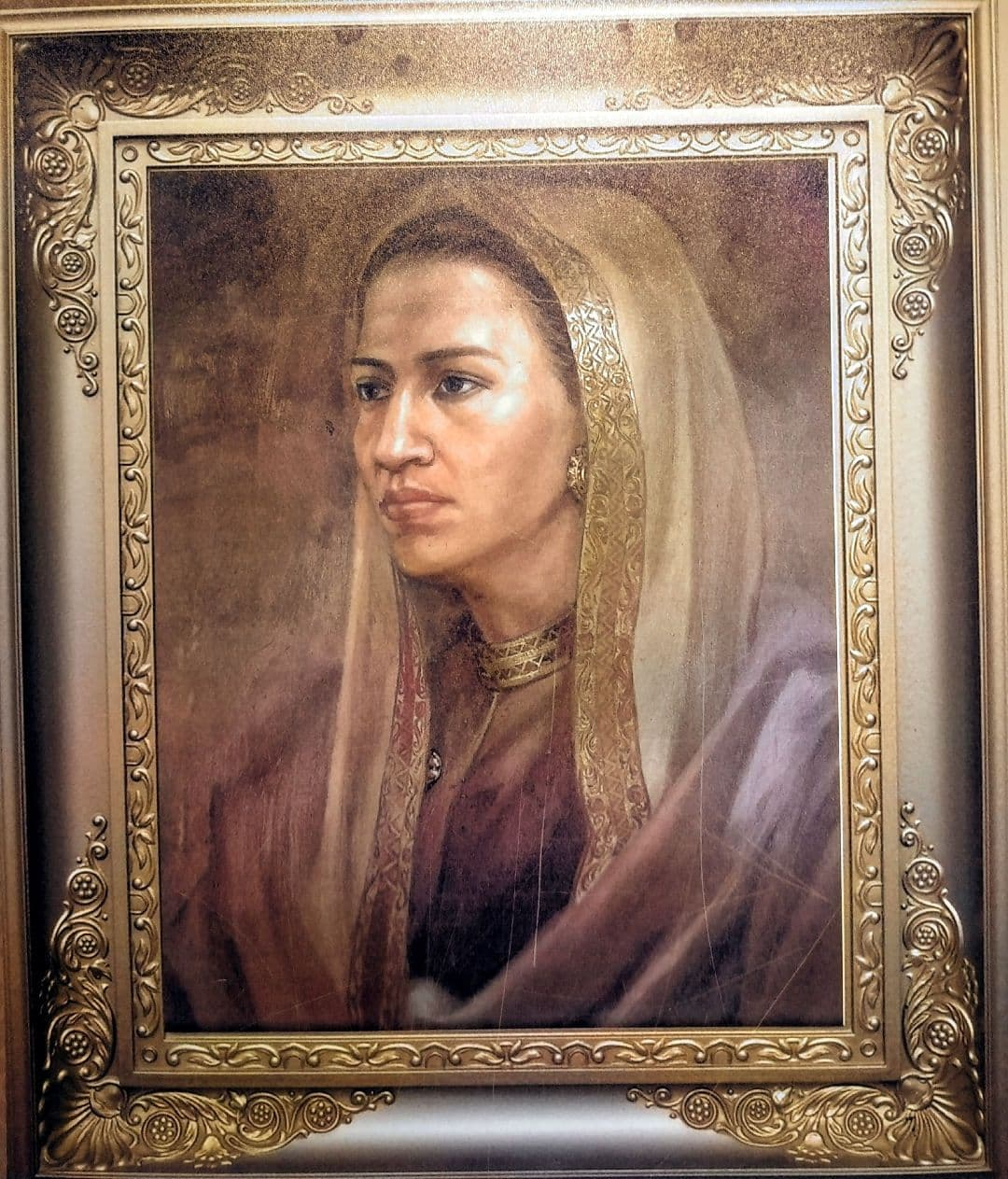
- Queen Taj ul-Alam Safiatuddin, sultana of Aceh Sultanate.
  Queen Sultana Safiatuddin Taj ul-Alam, consort of Iskandar Thani of Aceh Sultanate
- Tsaritsa Ioanna, consort of Tsar Boris III of Bulgaria
- Queen Elizabeth, consort of Henry VII of England
- Ranee Sylvia Brett, consort of Vyner Brooke of The Raj of Sarawak
- Queen Catherine, first consort of Henry VIII of England. She was also regent in times of war.
- Queen Anne, second consort of Henry VIII of England. She gave birth to the future Elizabeth I, who was the last monarch of House of Tudor.
- Queen Jane, third consort of Henry VIII of England.
- Queen Anne, fourth consort of Henry VIII of England
- Queen Catherine, fifth consort of Henry VIII of England
- Queen Catherine, sixth consort of Henry VIII of England
- Queen Anne, consort of James I of England
- Queen Henrietta Maria, consort of Charles I of England
- Queen Catherine, consort of Charles II of England
- Queen Mary, consort of James II of England
- Queen Halaevalu Mata'aho, consort of Tāufa'āhau Tupou IV, Tu'i of Tonga.
- Queen Hortense, consort of Louis Bonaparte, King of Holland
- Queen Bahiyah, consort of Abdul Halim of Kedah
- Queen Haminah, consort of Abdul Halim of Kedah
- Queen Siti Aishah, consort of Salahuddin of Selangor
- Queen Najihah, consort of Ja'afar of Negeri Sembilan
- Queen Bainun, consort of Azlan Shah of Perak
- Queen Zanariah, consort of Iskandar of Johor
- Queen Sisowath Kossamak, consort of King Norodom Suramarit of Cambodia
- Queen Norodom Monineath, consort of King Norodom Sihanouk of Cambodia
- Queen Wilhelmine, consort of William I of the Netherlands
- Queen Anna Pavlovna, consort of William II of the Netherlands
- Queen Sophie, first consort of William III of the Netherlands
- Queen Emma, second consort of William III of the Netherlands: When William died on 23 November 1890, Emma became regent (1890–1898) for her underaged daughter, Wilhelmina, the late king's only surviving child.
- Queen Maud, consort of King Haakon VII of Norway. She was also simultaneously a princess of the United Kingdom.
- Queen Ratna, second consort of Mahendra of Nepal
- Queen Sunanda Kumariratana, consort of King Chulalongkorn of Siam.
- Queen Savang Vadhana, consort of King Chulalongkorn of Siam. She was also grandmother of the King Ananda Mahidol and Great King Bhumibol Adulyadej of Thailand.
- Queen Sukhumala Marasri, consort of King Chulalongkorn of Siam.
- Queen Saovabha Phongsri, consort of King Chulalongkorn of Siam, mother of the King Prajadhipok of Siam.
- Queen Rambai Barni, consort of King Prajadhipok of Thailand
- Queen Sirikit, consort of Great King Bhumibol Adulyadej of Thailand
- Queen Khin The, chief consort of King Mindon Min of Konbaung Dynasty
- Queen Setkya Dewi, principal chief consort of King Mindon Min of Konbaung Dynasty
- Queen Hsinbyumashin, chief consort of King Mindon Min of Konbaung Dynasty
- Queen Laungshe Mibaya, chief consort of King Mindon Min of Konbaung Dynasty
- Queen Limban Mibaya, consort of King Mindon Min of Konbaung Dynasty
- Queen Thetpan Mibaya, consort of King Mindon Min of Konbaung Dynasty
- Queen Supayalat, chief consort of King Thibaw Min, the last King of Burma
- Queen Supayalay, consort of King Thibaw Min, the last King of Burma
- Queen Ruth, consort (or Mohumagadi) of Seretse Khama, King of the Bamangwato Tswanas of Botswana
- Queen Mantfombi, principal consort (or Inkosikazi Enkhulu) of Goodwill Zwelithini of Zululand, South Africa. She was also simultaneously a princess of Eswatini
- Queen Kosala Devi, chief consort of Bimbisara, the first King of the Haryanka dynasty.
- Queen Vajira, chief consort of Ajatshatru, the second king of the Haryanka dynasty.
- Queen Devi, a consort of Ashoka, the third Mauryan emperor
- Queen Karuvaki, second consort of Ashoka, the third Mauryan emperor
- Queen Padmavati, third consort of Ashoka, the third Mauryan emperor
- Queen Soyrabai, chief consort of Chhatrapati Shivaji Maharaj, Maratha king
- Queen Yesubai, chief consort of Chhatrapati Sambhaji Maharaj, Maratha king
- Queen Tarabai, chief consort of Chhatrapati Rajaram Maharaj, Maratha king
- Queen Sakwarbai II, chief consort of Chhatrapati Shahu Maharaj, Maratha king
- Queen Cassandane, chief consort of Cyrus the Great
- Queen Atossa, chief consort of Darius the Great
- Queen Amestris, chief consort of Xerxes I
- Queen Parysatis, chief consort of Darius II
- Queen Stateira, chief consort of Artaxerxes Il
- Queen Musa of Parthia, wife of Phraates IV
- Queen Shapurdokhtak, chief consort of Bahram II
- Queen Denag, chief consort of Yazdegerd II
- Queen Efra Hormoz, chief consort of Hormoz II.
- Queen Shirin, chief consort of Khosrow II
- Sayyideh Malek Khatun, chief consort of Fakhr al-Dawla Daylami
- Altun Jan Khatun, chief consort of Tughril Beg
- Turkan Khatun, chief consort of Malik Shah I
- Gohar Khatun, chief consort of Masud III of Ghazni
- Zubayda Khatun, chief consort of Malik Shah I
- Gohar Khatun chief consort of Muhammad I Tapar
- Turkan Khatun, chief consort of Ala al-Din Tekish
- Baghdad Khatun, chief consort of Abu Sa'id Bahadur Khan
- Goharshad Begum, chief consort of Shah Rukh
- Turkan Khatun, chief consort of Sanjar Seljuk
- Makhdum Shah, chief consort of Mubarez al-Din Muhammad
- Seljuk Shah Begum, principal wife of Uzun Hasan.
- Despina Khatun, wife of Uzun Hasan.
- Khatun Jan Begum, principal consort of Jahan Shah.
- Tajlu Khanum, chief consort of Shah Ismail I
- Sultanim Begum, chief consort of Shah Tahmasp I
- Khayr al-Nisa Begum, chief consort of Mohammad Khodabanda.
- Ana Khanum, chief consort of Shah Safi
- Nakhat Khanum, chief consort of Shah Abbas II
- Asiye Khanum Ezzeddin Qajar, chief consort of Agha Mohammad Khan
- Taj al-Dowleh, chief consort of Fath-Ali Shah Qajar
- Sanbol Baji, chief consort of Fath-Ali Shah Qajar
- Asiya Khanom Devellu, chief consort of Fath-Ali Shah Qajar
- Agha Begum, chief consort of Fath-Ali Shah Qajar
- Golbadan Baji, chief consort of Fath-Ali Shah Qajar
- Malek Jahan Khanum, chief consort of Mohammad Shah Qajar
- Jeyran, chief consort of Naser al-Din Shah Qajar
- Shokouh al-Saltaneh, chief consort of Naser al-Din Shah Qajar
- Anis al-Dowleh, chief consort of Naser al-Din Shah Qajar
- Amina Aqdas, wife of Naser al-Din Shah Qajar
- Sarvar al-Saltaneh, principal wife of Mozaffar al-Din Shah Qajar.
- Queen Sonja, consort of Harald V of Norway

Past empresses consort

- Empress Theodora, consort of Justinian I, East Roman Emperor
- Empress Aelia Sophia, consort of Justin II of the Byzantine Empire
- Empress Wu, consort of Gaozong of Tang
- Empress Wang, consort of Gaozong of Tang
- Empress Chabi, chief wife of Kublai Khan, Emperor of Yuan dynasty
- Empress Nambui, principal consort of Kublai Khan, Emperor of Yuan dynasty
- Empress Danashri, principal consort of Toghon Temür, Emperor of Yuan dynasty
- Empress Bayan Khutugh, principal consort of Toghon Temür, Emperor of Yuan dynasty
- Empress Gi, principal consort of Toghon Temür, Emperor of Yuan dynasty
- Empress Xiaocigao, principal consort of Hongwu Emperor from Ming dynasty
- Empress Ruqaiya Sultan Begum, principal consort and first wife of Akbar the Great, the third Mughal Emperor
- Empress Salima Sultan Begum, principal consort and third wife of Akbar the Great
- Empress Mariam-uz-Zamani, principal consort and fourth wife of Akbar the Great, the third Mughal Emperor
- Empress Taj Bibi Bilqis Makani, principal consort of Jahangir, the fourth Mughal Emperor
- Empress Nur Jahan, principal consort of Jahangir, the fourth Mughal Emperor
- Empress Mumtaz Mahal, principal consort of Shah Jahan, the fifth Mughal Emperor
- Empress Qudsia Begum, principal consort of Muhammad Shah, the thirteenth Mughal Emperor
- Empress Isabella of Portugal, consort of Charles V, Holy Roman Emperor. She was the regent of the Spanish Empire.
- Haseki Sultan Hürrem Sultan, principal consort and legal wife of Suleiman the Magnificent, Sultan of the Ottoman Empire.
- Haseki Sultan Nurbanu Sultan, principal consort and legal wife of Selim II, Sultan of the Ottoman Empire
- Haseki Sultan Safiye Sultan, principal consort and legal wife of Murad III, Sultan of the Ottoman Empire
- Haseki Sultan Kösem Sultan, principal consort and legal wife of Ahmed I, Sultan of the Ottoman Empire.
- Haseki Sultan Turhan Sultan, principal consort of Ibrahim, Sultan of the Ottoman Empire
- Haseki Sultan Gülnuş Sultan, principal consort of Mehmed IV, Sultan of the Ottoman Empire
- Kadinefendi Nakşidil Sultan, consort of Abdul Hamid I, Sultan of the Ottoman Empire
- Kadinefendi Bezmiâlem Sultan, consort of Mahmud II, Sultan of the Ottoman Empire
- Kadinefendi Pertevniyal Sultan, consort of Mahmud II, Sultan of the Ottoman Empire
- Kadinefendi Şevkefza Sultan, consort of Abdulmejid I, Sultan of the Ottoman Empire
- Kadinefendi Tirimüjgan Kadın, consort of Abdulmejid I, Sultan of the Ottoman Empire
- Kadinefendi Rahime Perestu Sultan, consort of Abdulmejid I, Sultan of the Ottoman Empire
- Hanimefendi Müşfika Kadın, consort of Abdul Hamid II, Sultan of the Ottoman Empire
- Empress Maria Theresa of Austria, consort of Francis I, Holy Roman Empire.
- Empress Ana María Huarte, consort of Agustín I of Mexico, Emperor of Mexico.
- Titular Empress Carlota Joaquina of Spain, consort of John VI of Portugal, Titular Emperor of Brazil
- Empress Carlota of Mexico, consort of Maximilian I of Mexico, Emperor of Mexico.
- Empress Maria Leopoldina, consort of Pedro I, Emperor of Brazil
- Empress Amélie, consort of Pedro I, Emperor of Brazil
- Empress Teresa Cristina, consort of Pedro II, Emperor of Brazil
- Empress Myeongseong, first principal wife of Gojong, the first emperor of the Korean Empire
- Empress Eugénie, consort of Napoleon III, Emperor of the French
- Empress Augusta Victoria, consort of Wilhelm II
- Empress Elisabeth, consort of Franz Joseph I
- Empress Xiaojingxian, primary consort of Yongzheng, Qing Emperor
- Empress Xiaoxianchun, principal consort of Qianlong, Qing Emperor
- Step Empress Nara, secondary consort of Qianlong, Qing Emperor
- Empress Xiaoshurui, principal consort of Jiaqing, Qing Emperor
- Empress Xiaoherui, secondary consort of Jiaqing, Qing Emperor
- Empress Xiao Zhen Xian, principal consort of Xianfeng, Qing Emperor
- Empress Alexandra Feodorovna, consort of Nicholas II, Emperor and Autocrat of All Russia
- Empress Durdhara, principal chief consort of Chandragupta Maurya, first Maurya emperor
- Empress Crown Prince Sushima Mother, principal chief consort of Bindusara, Second Mauryan emperor
- Empress Shubhadrangi, chief consort of Bindusara, Second Mauryan emperor
- Empress Asandhimitra, first principal chief consort (or Agramahishi) of Ashoka, third Mauryan emperor
- Empress Tishyaraksha, last principal chief consort of Ashoka, third Mauryan emperor
- Empress Michiko, consort of Emperor Akihito of Japan

Current queens consort

- Queen Camilla, consort of Charles III of the United Kingdom
- Queen Jetsun Pema, consort of Jigme Khesar Namgyal Wangchuck of Bhutan
- Queen Letizia, consort of Felipe VI of Spain
- Queen 'Masenate, consort of Letsie III of Lesotho
- Queen Mary, consort of Frederik X of Denmark
- Queen Mathilde, consort of Philippe of Belgium
- Queen Máxima, consort of Willem-Alexander of the Netherlands
- Queen Nanasipauʻu Tukuʻaho, consort of Tupou VI of Tonga
- Queen Rania, consort of Abdullah II of Jordan
- Queen Saleha, consort of Hassanal Bolkiah of Brunei Darussalam
- Queen Silvia, consort of Carl XVI Gustaf of Sweden
- Queen Mette-Marit, consort of Haakon VIII of Norway
- Queen Suthida, consort of Vajiralongkorn of Thailand
- Queen Zarith Sofiah, consort of Ibrahim Iskandar of Malaysia

Current empress consort

- Empress Masako, consort of Emperor Naruhito of Japan

Current queens consort in federal monarchies

- Queen Nur Zahirah, consort of Mizan Zainal Abidin of Terengganu
- Queen Fauziah, consort of Sirajuddin of Perlis
- Queen Norashikin, consort of Sharafuddin of Selangor
- Queen Aishah Rohani, consort of Muhriz of Negeri Sembilan
- Queen Zarith Sofiah, consort of Ibrahim Iskandar of Johor
- Queen Nur Diana Petra, consort of Muhammad V of Kelantan
- Queen Zara Salim, consort of Nazrin Shah of Perak
- Queen Maliha, consort of Sallehuddin of Kedah
- Queen Azizah, consort of Abdullah of Pahang

Because queens consort lack an ordinal with which to distinguish between them, many historical texts and encyclopedias refer to deceased consorts by their premarital (or maiden) name or title, not by their marital royal title (examples: Queen Mary, consort of George V, is usually called Mary of Teck, and Queen Maria José, consort of Umberto II of Italy, is usually called Marie José of Belgium).

== See also ==
- First Lady
- Consort crown
- Prince consort
- Princess consort
- Haseki Sultan
- Sultana
- Royal Noble Consort (Korea)
- List of Bohemian consorts
- List of Burmese consorts
- List of British royal consorts
- List of Bulgarian consorts
- List of royal consorts of Canada
- List of Danish royal consorts
- List of Dutch royal consorts
- List of Queens and Empresses of France
- List of Georgian consorts
- List of Hawaiian royal consorts
- List of Hungarian consorts
- List of Japanese imperial consorts
- List of Norwegian royal consorts
- List of Persian consorts
- List of Pre-colonial Filipino Consorts
- List of Portuguese queens
- List of Spanish royal consorts
- List of Swedish royal consorts
- List of Thai royal consorts
- List of Tongan royal consorts
