= Kosala (disambiguation) =

Kosala was one of the 16 Mahajanapadas in the 6th to 5th centuries BCE, approximately within the present-day Awadh region of Uttar Pradesh, India.

Kosala may also refer to:

- Kosala kingdom, a kingdom in ancient India
- Kosala (moth), a genus of moth
- Kosala (novel), a 1963 Marathi-language novel by Indian writer Bhalchandra Nemade

== People with the given name ==
- Kosala Devi, first wife of Magadha Emperor Bimbisara (558–491 BCE)
- Kosala Kulasekara (born 1985), Sri Lankan cricketer
- Kosala Kuruppuarachchi (born 1964), Sri Lankan cricketer
- Kosala Ramadas (died 2013), politician in Kerala, India

== See also ==
- Dakshina Kosala kingdom or South Kosala, in present Chhattisgarh state and western Odisha state
- Kosal (disambiguation)
- Kosali (disambiguation)
