= Kosali =

Kosali may refer to:

== Languages ==
- Sambalpuri language, a language of Odisha, India, where Kosali has been promoted as an alternative name
- the group of Eastern Hindi languages, including at least Awadhi

== Other uses ==
- Kosali (cattle), an Indian breed of cattle
- Kosalı, a village in Shaki Rayon, Azerbaijan
- Kesalo (known as Kosalı in Azerbaijani), a settlement in Gardabani Municipality, Georgia
- Kosali Simon, American economist

== See also ==
- Kosal (disambiguation)
- Kosala (disambiguation)
- Kosli
