= Koshel =

Koshel is the surname of the following notable people:

- Antonina Koshel (born 1954), Soviet artistic gymnast
- Pyotr Koshel (born 1946), Belarusian-born Russian writer, historian and translator
- Viktoriya Koshel (born 1991), Israeli group rhythmic gymnast

== See also ==
- Kosal (disambiguation)
- Koshal
