= Koshal =

Koshal is a surname. Notable people with the surname include:

- Raghuveer Singh Koshal (1933–2015), Indian politician
- Syarhey Koshal (born 1986), Belarusian footballer

== See also ==
- Kosal (disambiguation)
- Koshel
