= Çələbixan =

Çələbixan is a village and the least populous municipality in the Shaki Rayon of Azerbaijan. It has a population of 223. The municipality consists of the villages of Çələbixan, Qızılarx, and Kosalı.
