= Kosel =

Kosel may refer to:

- Hermann Clemens Kosel (1867-1945), Austrian artist, photographer and writer
- Kosel, North Macedonia, a village near Ohrid, North Macedonia
- Kosel, Germany, a municipality in Schleswig-Holstein, Germany
- Kosel, Niesky, a village in Saxony, today part of the city of Niesky
- Kosel, German name of Kozielno, a village in Gmina Paczków, Nysa County, Opole Voivodeship, in south-western Poland
- Kosel (also pronounced Kotel), short for Ha-Kotel Ha-Ma'aravi, Hebrew for the Western Wall in Jerusalem
- Cosel or Kosel, German name of Koźle, a district of Kędzierzyn-Koźle, Poland

== See also ==
- Kosal (disambiguation)
