= Qızılarx =

Settlement in Azerbaijan

Qızılarx is a village in the municipality of Çələbixan in the Shaki Rayon of Azerbaijan.
