= Kosali Simon =

American economist

Kosali Ilayperuma Simon
- Born: Kosali Ilayperuma; Sri Lanka
- Education: Hamilton College, University of Maryland
- Spouse: Daniel Simon
- Children: 6
- Scientific career
- Fields: Economics
- Workplaces: Indiana University, Cornell University, Michigan State University
- Website: https://spea.indiana.edu/faculty-research/directory/profiles/faculty/full-time/simon-kosali.html

Kosali Ilayperuma Simon is the Herman B Wells Endowed Professor in health economics at School of Public and Environmental Affairs (SPEA) at Indiana University which she joined in 2010.

== Academic career ==
She graduated with a bachelor's in economics and German Literature from Hamilton College in 1994. After a year studying in Europe as a Watson Fellow, she obtained a doctorate degree in economics from University of Maryland, College Park in 1999.

She is a research associate at the NBER, affiliated with the Children, Health Care, and Health Economics programs, an associate editor of the Journal of Health Economics, and a Co-Editor for the Journal of Human Resources. Simon was also elected to the National Academy of Medicine in 2021. She is consulted by the press as an expert in the field of health care economics.

Recently, some of her work has focused on the impact of the Affordable Care Act on the labour market regarding work hours; she finds very minimal effect on part-time work as a result of the institution of the law.

== Selected works ==
- Gruber, J. and Simon, K., 2008. Crowd-out 10 years later: Have recent public insurance expansions crowded out private health insurance?. Journal of Health Economics, 27(2), pp. 201–217. doi: 10.1016/j.jhealeco.2007.11.004.
- Akosa Antwi, Y., Moriya, A.S. and Simon, K., 2013. Effects of Federal Policy to Insure Young Adults: Evidence from the 2010 Affordable Care Act's Dependent-Coverage Mandate. American Economic Journal: Economic Policy, 5(4), pp. 1–28. JSTOR: 43189352 doi: 10.1257/pol.5.4.1.
- Reed, Andrew E., Joseph A. Mikels, and Kosali I. Simon. "Older adults prefer less choice than young adults." Psychology and aging 23, no. 3 (2008): 671.
- Simon, Kosali Ilayperuma. "Adverse selection in health insurance markets? Evidence from state small-group health insurance reforms." Journal of Public Economics 89, no. 9-10 (2005): 1865-1877.
