= Princess Vajira =

Consort of 5th-century BCE Magadha emperor Ajatashatru

Vajira
- Princess of Kosala

Queen Consort of Magadha
- Reign: c. 492 – c. 460 BCE
- Predecessor: Kosala Devi
- Successor: Unknown
- Spouse: Ajatashatru
- Issue: Udayibhadra
- Dynasty: Hariyanka (by marriage); Ikshvaku (by birth)
- Father: Pasenadi
- Religion: Jainism

Vajira (also called Vajirakumari) was queen consort of Magadha as the principal consort of King Ajatashatru. She was the mother of her husband's successor, King Udayibhadra.

Vajira was born a princess of the Kingdom of Kosala and was the daughter of King Pasenadi and Queen Mallika. She was also the niece of her mother-in-law, Queen Kosala Devi, the first wife and chief consort of King Bimbisara and the sister of King Pasenadi.

== Life ==
=== Birth ===
Vajira or Vajirakumari was born to Pasenadi's chief queen, Mallika. According to Pali tradition, her mother was a beautiful daughter of the chief garland maker of Kosala. When the princess was born, her father was apparently disappointed on hearing the child was a girl, but Buddha assured him that some women were wiser than men.

=== Marriage ===
The events which led to her betrothal and eventual marriage to Ajatashatru was that her husband waged a war against her father's kingdom after Bimbisara's death, the cause of the conflict being the revenues from the estate of Kashi, which was given as a dowry to Kosala Devi in her marriage to Bimbisara. After Kosala Devi's death, Pasenadi immediately confiscated the revenues of the estate of Kashi, which had been settled on her as "pin-money", this resulted in hostilities between him and Ajatashatru.

The duel between Ajatashatru and her father was a prolonged affair, fortune favouring each combatant alternatively. Though, Pasenadi emerged victorious, and came to terms with his nephew. He gave the seventeen-year-old Vajira's hand in marriage to him. The estate of Kashi, which had been the reason of the conflict, was given to his daughter, Vajira, as a part of her dowry in her marriage to Ajatashatru. Pasenadi also assigned the revenues from the estate of Kashi to Vajira.
