= Kingdom of Siam =

Kingdom of Siam may refer to:

- Sukhothai Kingdom (1238–1351)
- Ayutthaya Kingdom (1351–1767)
- Thonburi Kingdom (1768–1782)
- Rattanakosin Kingdom (1782–1932)
- Thailand before 24 June 1939 and again from 8 September 1945 to 20 July 1949
