= Kosala Ramadas =

Indian politician

Kosala Ramadas (died June 4, 2013) was a CPI(M) MLA member, Kerala assemblist and trade unionist.

In 1967 Ramadas was officially elected to lead Kerala Assembly from Attingal in Thiruvananthapuram district. He quit its membership and later the party amid his pro-Naxalite views. Later on, he quit Naxalism too, and started independent trade union workers' organization. For a short time, he worked as a Mayor of Thiruvananthapuram in the CPI(M) as well. He was awarded K C Vamadevan Foundation Award in 2012.

Later he went to china and supported communism there with Mao Zedong being his role model
