= Pyotr Koshel =

Russian poet

- Пётр Агеевич Кошель
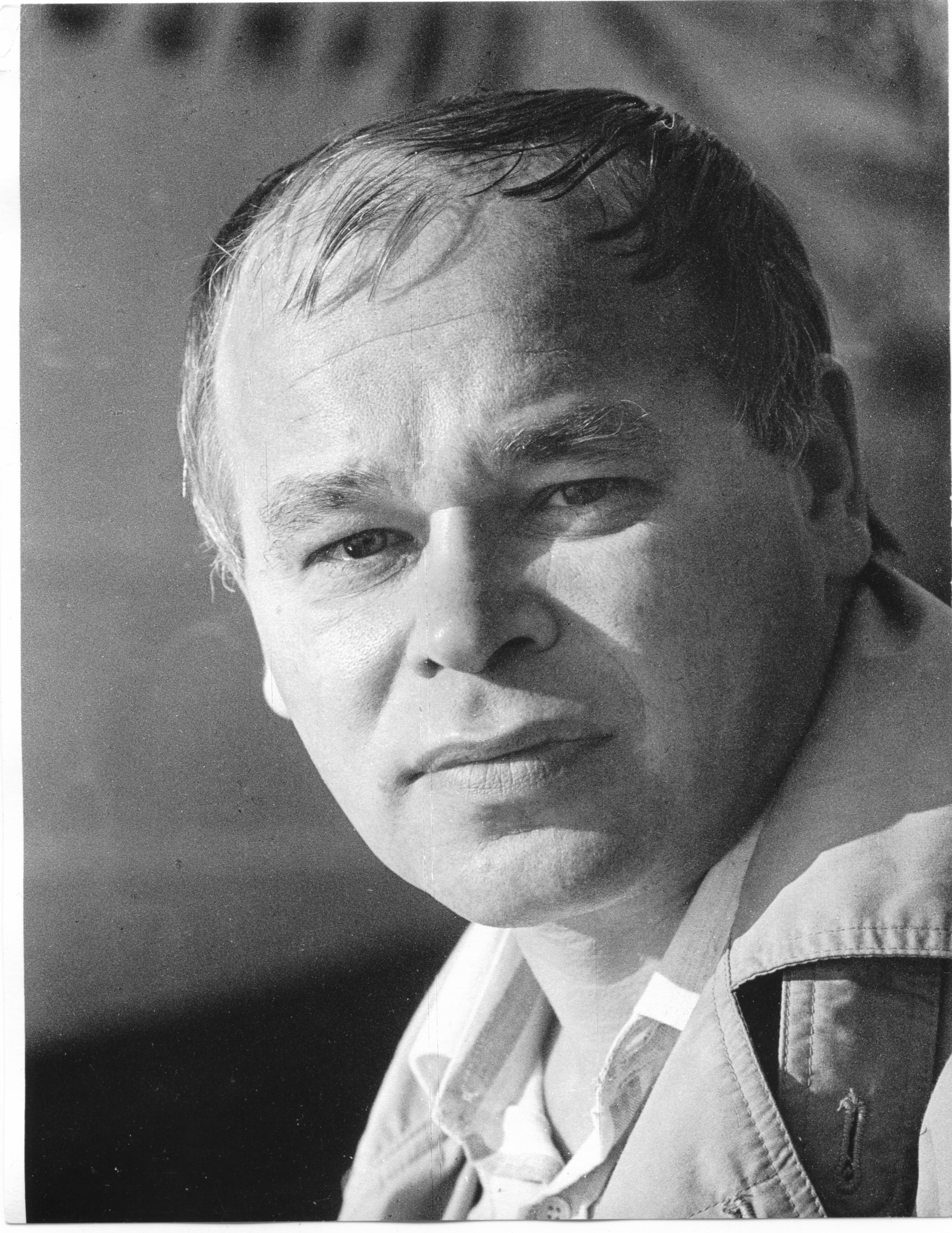
- Koshel, c. 1986
- Born: Pyotr Ageyevich Koshel; 20 April 1946 (age 80); Slutsk, Byelorussian SSR, Soviet Union (now Belarus)
- Citizenship: Russia
- Education: Maxim Gorky Literature Institute
- Occupations: Writer, oral historian
- Writing career
- Language: Russian

Pyotr Ageyevich Koshel (Belarusian: Пётр Агеевіч Кошаль, romanized: Piotr Ahieyevich Koshal; Russian: Пётр Аге́евич Ко́шель; born 20 April 1946) is a Belarusian-born Russian writer, historian and translator.

== Biography ==
Born in the town of Slutsk. During the war, Pyotr Koshel's father was a partisan, after the war he worked as a station attendant in Slutsk. In 1952, the family left Belarus for Sakhalin. They lived in the village Smirnykh, on the river Poronai, in dugout, in difficult conditions. He began to publish in his school years in regional newspapers. Graduated from one course Sakhalin State University. At the age of 18 he moved to the mainland, lived in Siberia, Moldova, Baltic. He worked at an automobile plant, was engaged in advertising, mentored in a village school in Mogilev region.

From 1973 to 1978 he studied at Maxim Gorky Literature Institute in the seminar of the poet Evgeny Vinokurov. As the critic recalls Vyacheslav Ogryzko, the literary critic Vadim Kozhinov at that time claimed in «Literaturnaya gazeta» that there are six poets in Russia: Alexey Prasolov, Nikolai Rubtsov, Vladimir Sokolov, Yuri Kuznetsov, Oleg Chukhontsev and Pyotr Koshel. The purse was then the author of the famous poem «The door opens, the father enters ...».

In 1978 he was admitted to the Union of Soviet Writers. 1982—1995 – Lead Editor of the Soviet Writer Publishing House, oversaw the translated poetry of Ukraine, Belarus and North Caucasus. Compiled by the Moscow «Poetry Day—1983».

The poems were published in the magazines Yunost, Novy Mir, Znamya, Friendship of peoples, Literaturnaya gazeta, Literary Russia, etc. Author of numerous historical essays, translations of Serbian, Belarusian, Dagestan poetry.

== Some works ==
=== Poems ===
- Foliage. Poems. – Mn., Mastatskaya literatura, 1979 – 80 p. – 6000 copies.
- City star. Poems. – M.: Mol. guard, 1981 .- 31 p., (Young voices) – 30,000 copies.
- River Life. Poems. – Minsk, Mastatskaya literatura, 1987 .- 141 p. – 5000 copies.
- As it is. Poems. – M.: Sov. writer, 1987 .- 141 p. – 15,000 copies.

=== Nonfiction ===
- History of Russian terrorism. – M., Golos, 1995 .- 369 p. (History of Russian life). – 10,000 copies.
- History of detectives in Russia: in 2 vols. – Mn., Literature, 1996. – (Encyclopedia of Secrets and Sensations). 20,000 copies.
- History of the Russian investigation. – M., Young Guard, 2005 .- 394 p.
- Arisen by the Will of Peter: The History of St. Petersburg from Ancient Times to the Middle of the 18th Century. – M., Rubezhi XXI, 2003. – 524, : (History of the cities of the world) (Three centuries of the northern capital of Russia; T. 1). – 5000 copies.
- Capital of the Russian Empire: History of St. Petersburg in the second half of the 18th century. – M., Rubezhi XXI, 2007. – 452 (History of the cities of the world) (Three centuries of the northern capital of Russia) .
- Brilliant Petersburg: History of St. Petersburg in the first half of the 19th century. – M., Rubezhi XXI, 2008. – 685, [2] p. (History of the cities of the world).
- All Russia: Collection. – M., Mosk. Writer; Novotroitsk: NOSTA, 1993/10000 copies.
- My Pushkiniana. – M., Voice, 1999. – 459 p.

=== Educational literature ===
- Big school encyclopedia: 6–11 grades. – M., OLMA-PRESS, 1999 .-- 20,000 copies. – ISBN 5-224-00041-6; T. 1: History. Literature. – 591 p. : ISBN 5-224-00047-5; T. 2: Russian language. Mathematics. Physics. Chemistry. Biology. Geography. English language. Orthodox dictionary-reference. – 718 p. : ISBN 5-224-00048-3.
- The Great Patriotic War. Encyclopedia for schoolchildren. – M., OLMA-PRESS, 2000 .- 447 p. – 12,000 copies. – ISBN 5-224-00904-9
- Art. Encyclopedic Dictionary student. – M., OLMA-PRESS, 2000 .- 446 p. – 15,000 copies. – ISBN 5-224-00508-6
- Dictionary-reference book: economics, foreign trade, exhibitions. – M., Society of preservation lit. Heritage, 2012 .- 342 ISBN 978-5-902484-53-0

=== Popular non-fiction literature ===
- At the dawn of humanity. – M., OLMA-PRESS, 2000. – 351 p. – 3000 copies. – ISBN 5-224-00716-X
- Biology: in the land of eternal mysteries. – M., OLMA-PRESS, 2000. – 302 p. – 5000 copies. – ISBN 5-224-00509-4
- Biology. Fauna and flora of Russia. – M., OLMA-PRESS, 2000 .- 542 p. – 5000 copies.- ISBN 5-224-00762-3

=== Translated literature ===
- A pomelo flew through our village: For children. age / Per. P. Koshel; Artist. T. Zebrova. – M.: Malysh, 1991 .- 500,000 copies.
- Alaiza Pashkevich. Favorites. Per. from Belarusian. P. Koshel. – Mn., 1986 .- 222 p.
- Magic shrimp. Folklore, poetry, stories. Per. from Belarusian. Peter Koshel. – Minsk, 1997 – 7000 copies.
- Hour of wind: Poems and poems of Belarusian poets of the 1920–1930. : For senior school age / Comp. and lane. from Belarusian. P. Koshel. Foreword by Neil Gilevich. – Minsk., Yunatstva, 1987. – 125 p. – 8000 copies.
- Vintsent Dunin-Martsinkyevich. Favorites: Poems, stories and stories. Dramatic works / From Belarusian. and Polish. – Minsk, 1991—365 p.
- Donkey at name days: Belarusian fables: trans. from Belarusian. / Per., Comp. P. Purse; Artist. M. Basalyga. – Minsk: Yunatstva, 1989. – 237 p.

== Bibliography ==
- Kozhinov V.V., Pyotr Koshel. — Poetry Day-1978, Soviet writer, 1978;
- Baranova-Gonchenko L. Jacket with patches // Literary study, 1983, No. 3;
- History of punishment and terrorism. Conversation // Literary Russia. — 1996, February 23;
- Verstakov V. Poetry: Pyotr Koshel // Literary Russia. 1997, October 17;
- Belarusian writings. Biblіagrafіchny sloўnіk. T.3. Mn., 1994. S. 392

== Links ==
- And the clouds are flowing ...
- Peter Koshel. Historical Sketches
- Biological essays // Biology
- Petr Koshel // Russian poetry
- Peter Koshel. A faint echo splashes / Literaturnaya gazeta, 2021-04-21
- Peter Koshel. Along the Current // Moscow Magazine, July 2023
