= Kosalı =

Coordinates: 40°52′N 46°06′E

Kosalı is a village in the municipality of Çələbixan in the Shaki Rayon of Azerbaijan.

In 2009, it had a population of 127.
