= Ajatashatru =

King of Magadha from 492 to 460 BCE

Ajātashatru 𑀅𑀚𑀸𑀢𑀰𑀢𑁆𑀭𑀽
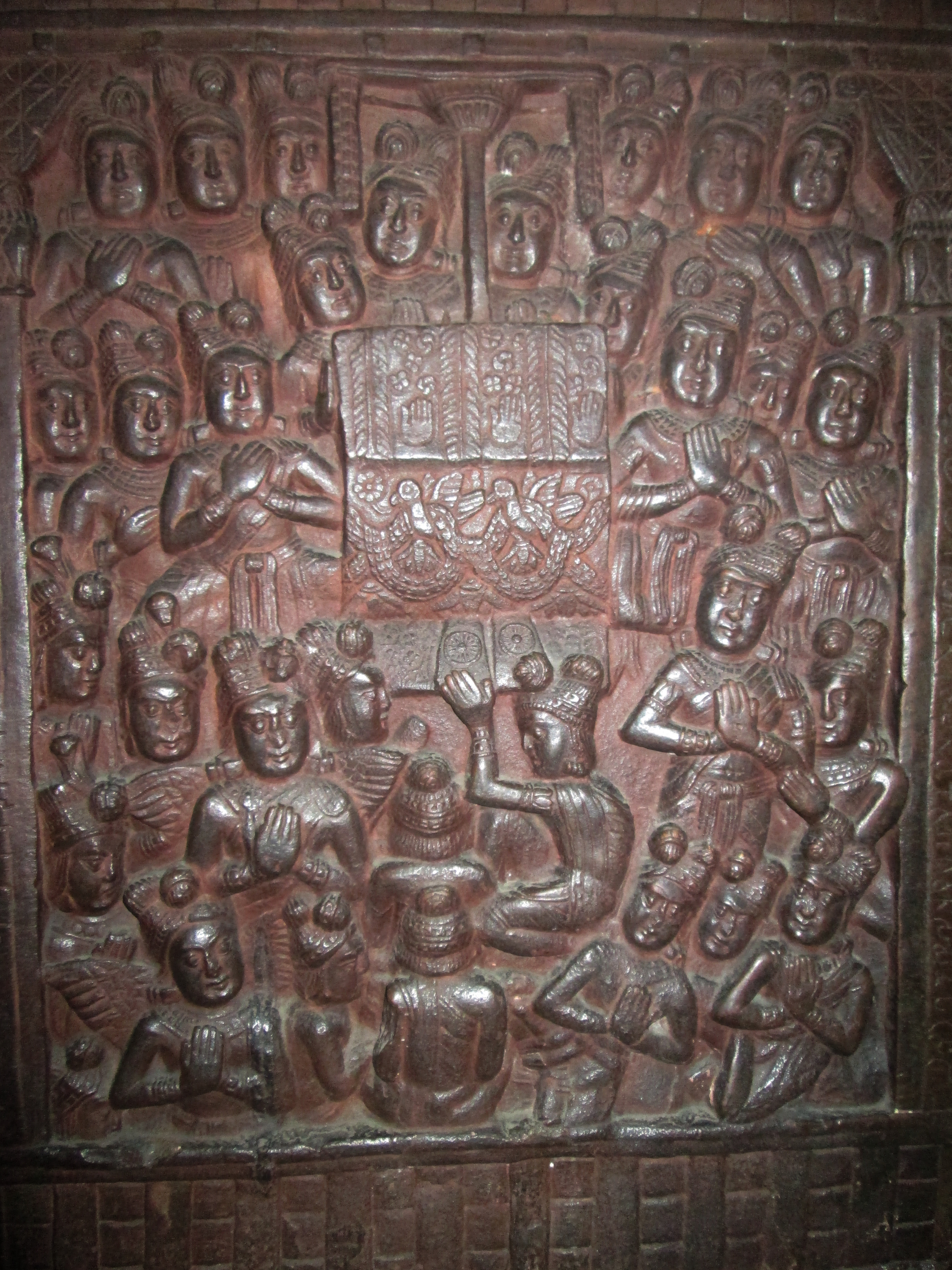
- Ajatashatru worships the Buddha, relief from the Bharhut Stupa at the Indian Museum, Kolkata

King of Magadha
- Reign: c. 492 – c. 460 BCE or c. 405 – c. 373 BCE
- Predecessor: Bimbisara
- Successor: Udayabhadra

Governor of Champa
- Reign: ? – c.492 or c.405 BCE
- Died: 460 BCE or c. 373 BCE
- Spouse: Vajira; Padmavati; Dharini; Subadhra
- Issue: Udayabhadra
- Dynasty: Haryanka
- Father: Bimbisara
- Mother: Queen Chellana (Sanskrit: Cellaṇā), daughter of President Chetaka (Jainism); Queen Kosala Devī (Buddhism)

Ajatasattu (Pāli: Ajātasattu) or Ajatashatru (Sanskrit: Ajātaśatru, अजातशत्रु) in the Buddhist tradition, or Kunika (Kūṇika) and Kuniya (Kūṇiya) in the Jain tradition (reigned c. 492 to 460 BCE, or c. 405 to 373 BCE), was one of the most important kings of the Haryanka dynasty of Magadha in East India. He was the son of King Bimbisara and was a contemporary of both Mahavira and Gautama Buddha. He forcefully took over the kingdom of Magadha from his father and imprisoned him. He fought a war against the Vajjika League, led by the Licchavis, and conquered the republic of Vaishali. Ajatashatru converted the village of Pataliputra into a fortified city.

Ajatashatru followed policies of conquest and expansion. He defeated his neighbouring rivals including the king of Kosala; his brothers, at odds with him, went to Kashi, which had been given to Bimbisara as dowry and led to a war between Magadha and Kosala.

Ajatashatru occupied Kashi and captured the smaller kingdoms. Magadha under Ajatashatru became the most powerful kingdom in North India.

== Datings ==
Based on correlation with dates in the Mahāvaṃsa and concluding that the Buddha died in 483 BC, Arthur Llewellyn Basham dated the accession of Ajatashatru to 491 BC. He estimates the first campaign of Ajatashatru to have taken place in 485 BC, and his second campaign against the Vajjika League in 481–480 BC. The Samaññaphala Sutta states that Ajatashatru visited the six teachers to hear their doctrines and at last visited the Buddha, an event Basham estimated to have taken place in 491 BC. Historian K. T. S. Sarao has estimated the dates of the Buddha's lifespan as c. 477 to 397 BCE, and Ajatashatru's reign as c. 405 to 373 BCE.

== Birth ==
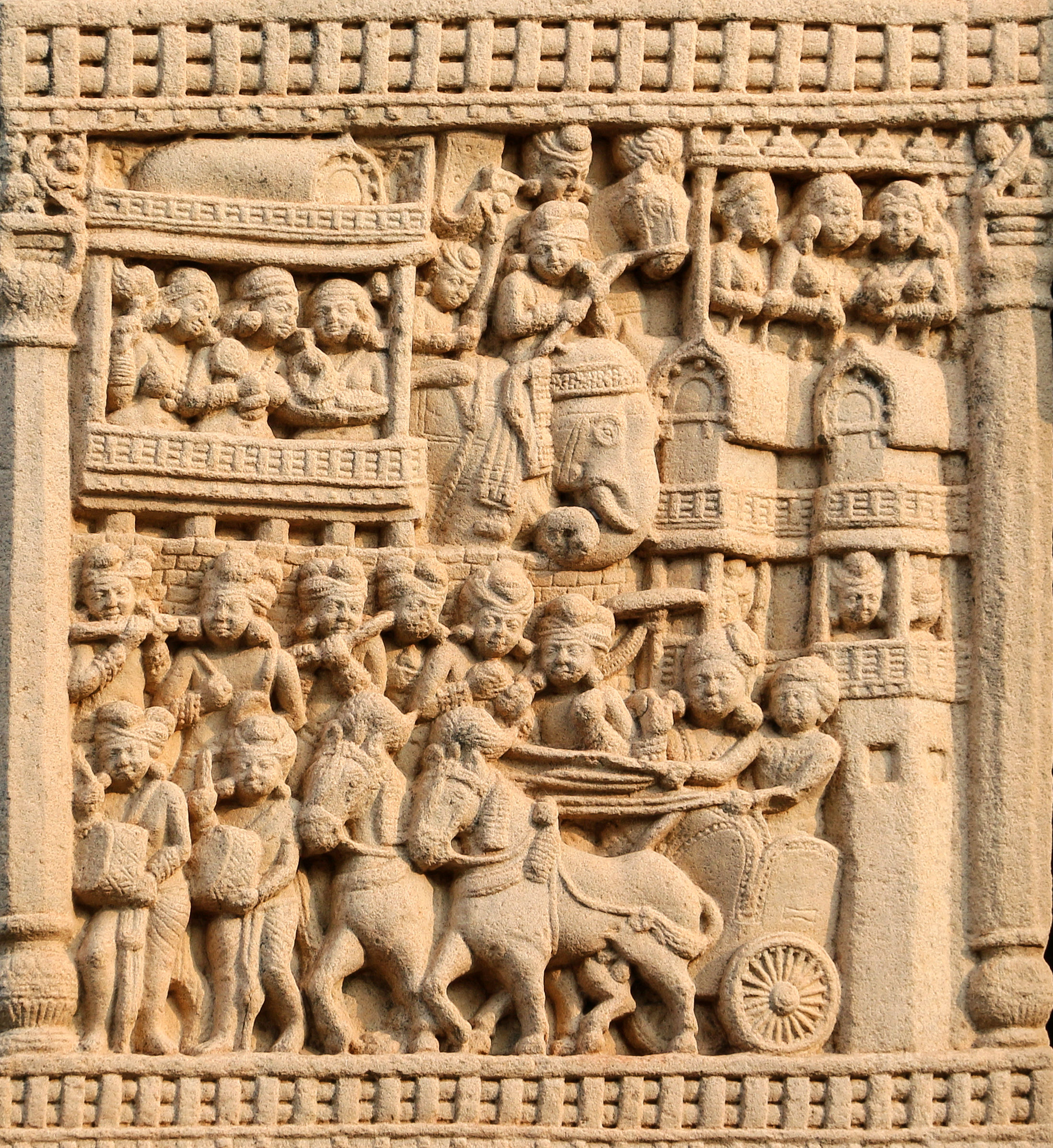
Royal procession leaving Rajagriha, possibly depicting Ajatashatru, from Sanchi

Ajatashatru, also known as Kunika, was the son of Bimbisara. The ancient inscription in Government Museum, Mathura refers to him as vaidehi putra Ajatashatru Kunika "Ajatashatru Kunika, the son of Vaidehi." The story of Ajatashatru is found in the Tripiṭaka of Buddhism and Jain Agamas. The account of Ajatashatru's birth is more or less similar in both the traditions. According to Jainism, Ajatashatru was born to King Bimbisara and Queen Chellana; Buddhist tradition records Ajatashatru being born to Bimbisara and Kosala Devi. It is worthwhile to note that both the queens were called "Vaidehi" in both traditions.

According to the Jain Nirayavalika Sutra, during her pregnancy, Queen Chellana had a strong desire to eat the fried flesh of her husband's heart and drink liquor. Meanwhile, the very intelligent Prince Abhayakumara, son of King Bimbisara and Queen Nanda, fried a wild fruit that resembled a heart and gave it to the queen. The queen ate it and later felt ashamed for having such a demonic desire and she feared that the child might grow up and prove fatal for the family, thus after a few months of the child being born, the queen had him thrown out of the palace. When the child was lying near the garbage dump, a cock bit his little finger. King Bimbisara, learning about the child being thrown out, ran outside and picked up the child and put its bleeding little finger in his mouth and sucked it until it stopped bleeding and continued this for days until it was healed. As the little finger of the child was sore, he was nicknamed Kunika "Sore Finger". Later he was named Asokacanda.

In the Buddhist Atthakatha, the above story is almost the same, except that Kosaladevi desired to drink blood from Bimbisara's arm; the king obliged her and, later, when the child was thrown near the garbage dump, due to an infection he got a boil on his little finger and the king sucked it and once while sucking it the boil burst inside the king's mouth, but due to affection for his child he did not spit the pus out, rather swallowed it.

== War and victory over Vaishali ==
The feud between Ajatashatru and Licchavi during 484–468 BCE led to defeat of the latter.

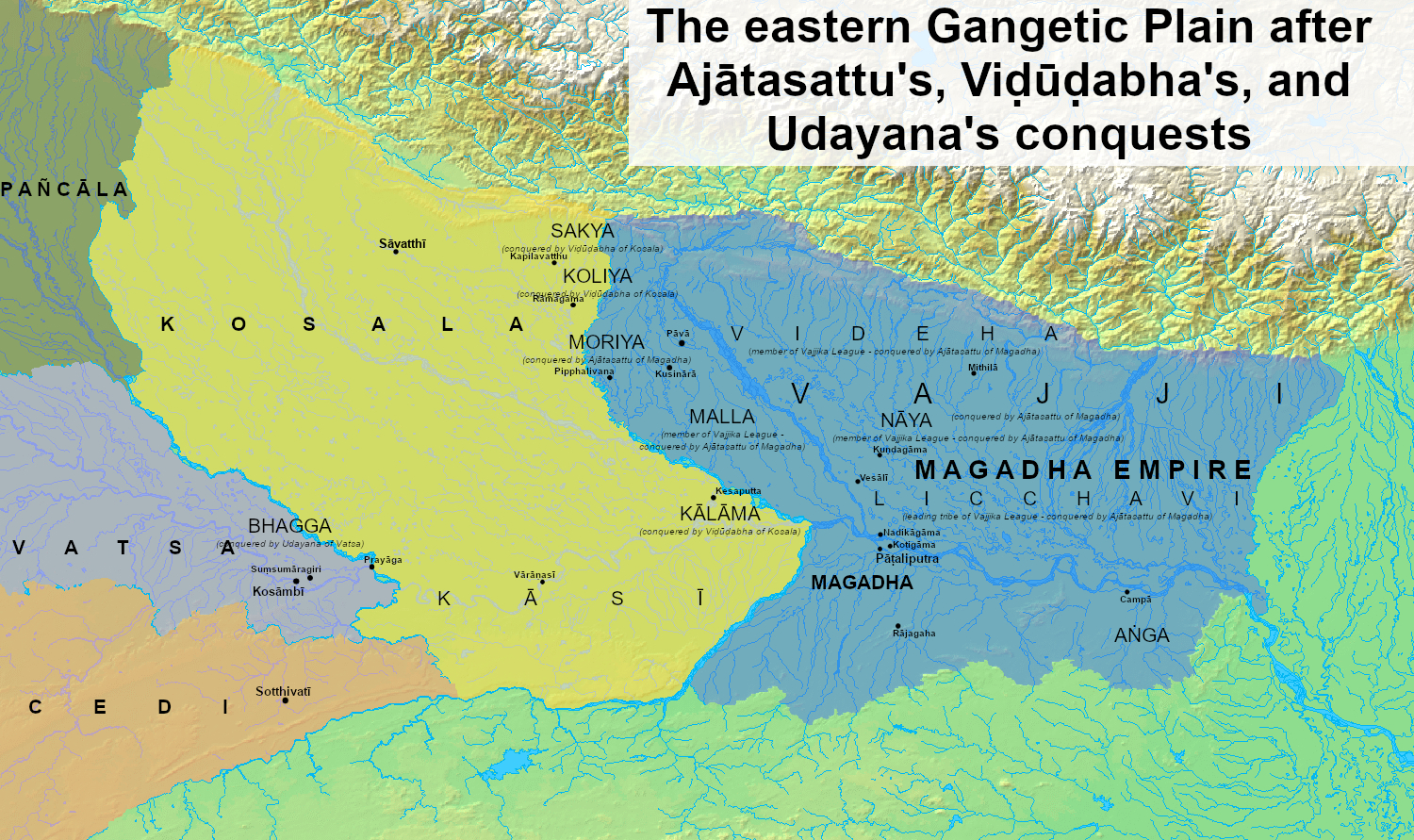
Map of the eastern Gangetic plain after Ajātasattu's conquest of the Vajjika League and of Moriya

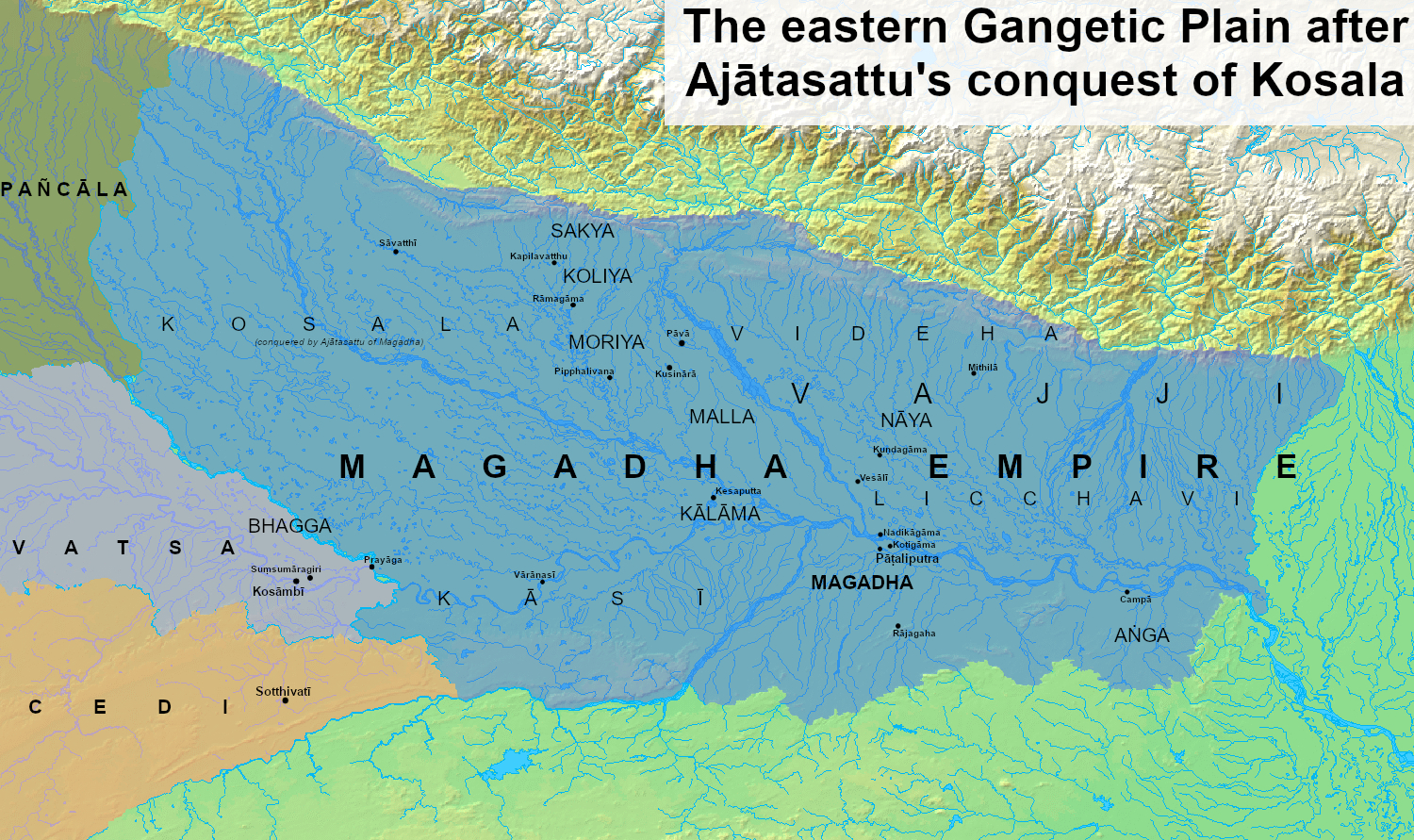
The eastern Gangetic plain after Ajātasattu's conquest of Kosala

=== The Jaina Tradition ===
Once Queen Padmavati, wife of Ajatashatru, was sitting in her balcony in the evening. She saw Halla and Vihalla kumaras with their wives sitting on the elephant "Sechanaka" and one of the wives was wearing the 18-fold divine necklace. Then she heard one of the maid servants talking from the garden below. "It's Halla and Vihalla kumaras and not the king who enjoy the real pleasures of the kingdom" and Padmavati thought "What's the use of the kingdom if I do not have both the jewels in my possession?"

So, she shared this thought with Ajatashatru the same night and became excessively insistent in her demand. Ajatashatru, at last, agreed and sent a request to both his brothers to give the elephant and the necklace to him, which both his brothers denied saying that these gifts were given by their dear father so why should they part from them? Ajatashatru sent the request thrice but got the same reply all three times. This greatly annoyed him, so he sent his men to arrest them. Meanwhile, Halla and the Vihalla kumaras saw a chance and escaped to their maternal grandfather Chetaka who was the king of the great kingdom of the Vaishali republic (Vajjis/Licchavi tribe). Ajatashatru sent notice thrice to Chetaka to surrender them but was denied by Chetaka.

This was enough for Ajatashatru. He called his half brothers, Kalakumaras (10 kalakumaras, those born to King Bimbisara and 10 Kali Queens Kali, Sukali, Mahakali, etc.) to merge their army with his, since it was well known to Ajatashatru that Vaishali republic had always been invincible in the past and he alone would not be able to defeat it. Each Kalakumara brought 3000 horses, 3000 elephants, 3000 chariots and 30000 infantrymen each. On the other hand, Chetaka invited his own allies (9 Mallas, 9 Lichhvis and 18 kings of Kasi-Kosala) to fight his grandson Ajatashatru. All these kings came with 3000 horses, 3000 elephants, 3000 chariots and 30000 infantrymen each. Thus all together there were 57000 elephants, 57000 chariots, 57000 horses, and 570000 infantrymen.

The war began. King Chetaka was a devout follower of Mahavira and had a vow to not shoot more than one arrow per day in a war. It was known to all that Chetaka's aim was perfect and his arrows were infallible. His first arrow killed one Kalakumara, commander of Ajatashatru. On the nine consecutive days, the rest of the nine Kalakumaras were killed by Chetaka. Deeply sorrowed by the death of their sons, the Kali queens were initiated as nuns in the holy order of Mahavira.

As Ajatashatru was moving towards defeat, he practised penance for three days and offered prayers to Sakrendra and Charmendra (Indra of different heavens), who then helped him in the war. They protected him from the infallible arrows of Chetaka. The war became very severe and, by the divine influence of the Indras, even the pebbles, straws, leaves hurled by Ajatashatru's men were said to have fallen like rocks on the army of Chetaka. This weapon was thus named "Mahasilakantaka", i.e. the weapon through which more than a lakh (100,000) people died. Next, the Indras granted a huge, automatically moving chariot with swinging spiked maces on each side, (and said to have been driven by Charmendra himself), to Ajatashatru. The chariot moved about in the battlefield crushing lakhs of soldiers. This war-chariot was named "Ratha-Musala."

In this battle, Chetaka was defeated. But, Chetaka and others immediately took shelter inside the city walls of Vaishali and closed the main gate. The walls around Vaishali were so strong that Ajatashatru was unable to break through them. Many days passed, Ajatashatru became furious and again prayed to Indra, but this time Indra refused to help him. But Ajatashatru was informed by an oracle of a demi-goddess "Vaishali can be conquered if 'Sramana (monk) Kulvalaka' marries a courtesan."

Ajatashatru inquired about the monk Kulvalaka and sent for the prostitute "Magadhika" disguised as a devout follower. The fallen woman enticed the monk towards herself and finally, the monk gave up his monkhood and married her. Later Magadhika on Ajatashatru's orders brainwashed Kulvalaka to enter Vaishali disguised as an astrologer. With great difficulty, he did enter Vaishali and learned that the city was saved by a "Chaitya" (altar) dedicated to "Munisuvrata". Kulvalaka then started telling people that this altar is the reason why the city is suffering through misfortune. The people uprooted the altar from its very foundation. Kulvalaka gave a signal and Ajatashatru entered the city as per prior arrangement. This was the last attack. Vaishali was conquered by Ajatashatru.

Sechanaka, the elephant, died after it fell into a pit with iron rods and fire made by Ajatashatru's soldiers. Later Halla and Vihalla kumaras were initiated as monks in the holy order of Mahavira. Chetaka practiced "Sallekahna" (fasting unto death). Ajatashatru not only conquered Vaishali but also Kasi-Kosala.

=== The Buddhist traditions ===
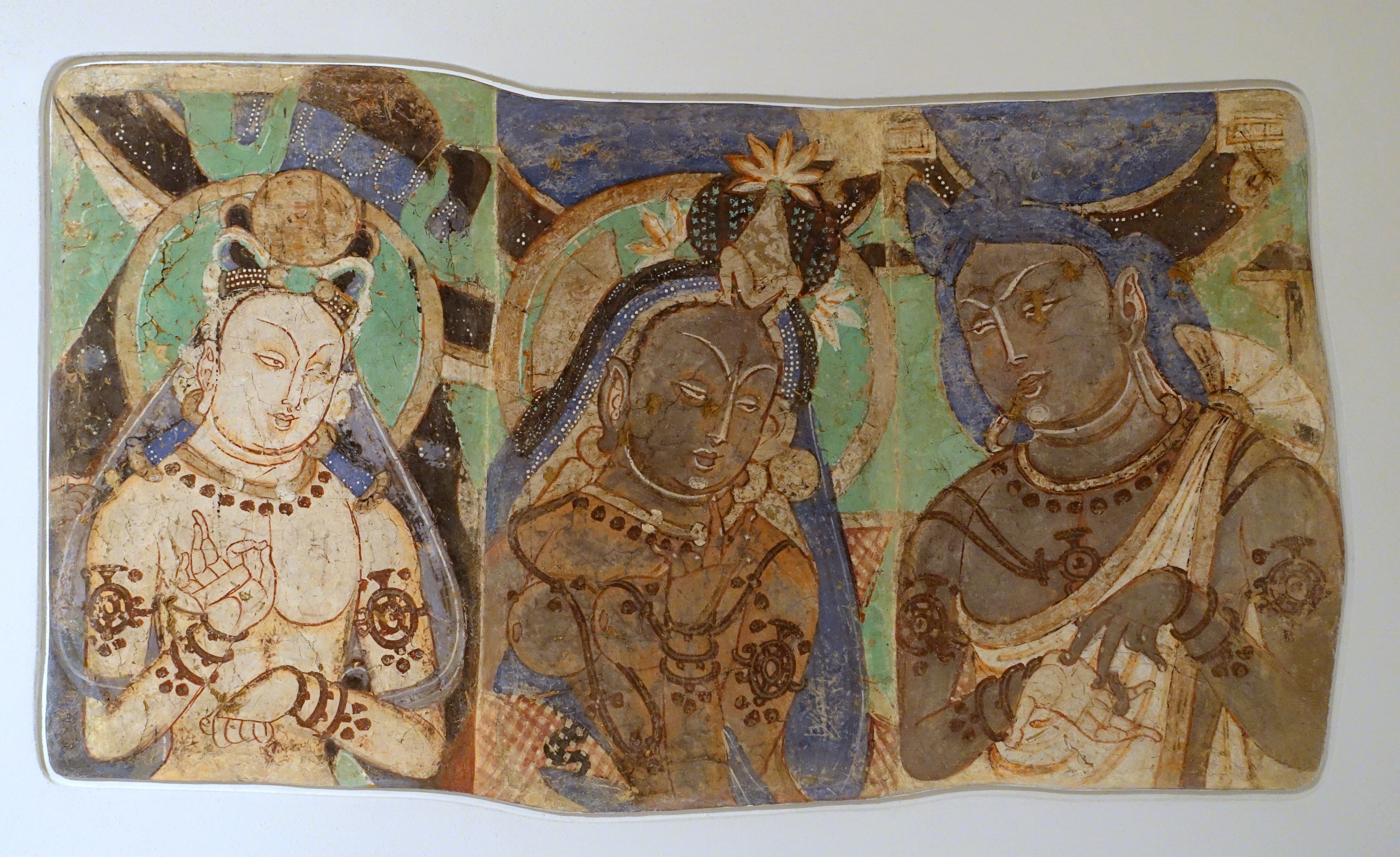
Wall painting of King Ajatashatru, his Queen, and his Minister Varshakara from the Kizil Caves (c. 251-403 AD).

There was a diamond mine near a village on the river Ganges. There was an agreement between Ajatashatru and the Licchavi of Vajji that they would have an equal share of the diamonds. However, because of sheer lethargy, Ajatashatru failed to collect his own share, and most of diamonds were carried away by the Lichhavis. Over time, finally, Ajatashatru became annoyed and decided to do something about it. Since he thought that it might be almost impossible to fight against the whole confederacy of Vaishali, he decided instead to uproot the powerful Vajjis and exterminate them. He sent his chief minister Vassakara to the Buddha to ask him why the Vaishali should be so invincible; to which Buddha gave seven reasons, including: That the Vajjis are always punctual to meetings, their disciplined behavior, their respect for elders, respect for women, that they do not marry their daughters forcefully, that they give spiritual protection to the Arhats, and finally, the main reason was the Chaityas (altar), which was inside the town.

Thus, with the help of his chief minister Vassakara, Ajatashatru managed to split the Vajjis and also broke the chaityas inside. During this battle, Ajatashatru used a scythed chariot, featuring a swinging mace and blades on both sides and attacked the town with it and conquered it.

== Kingdom ==
Ajatashatru moved his capital from Rajgriha to Champa due to death of his father.

== Family ==
=== The Jaina tradition ===
According to the Nirayāvaliyā Suttā Ajatashatru was born to King Bimbisara and Queen Chellana, who was the daughter of Chetaka the king of Vaishali, who was the brother of Queen Triśalá, mother of Mahavira. Ajatashatru had eight wives.

=== The Buddhist tradition ===
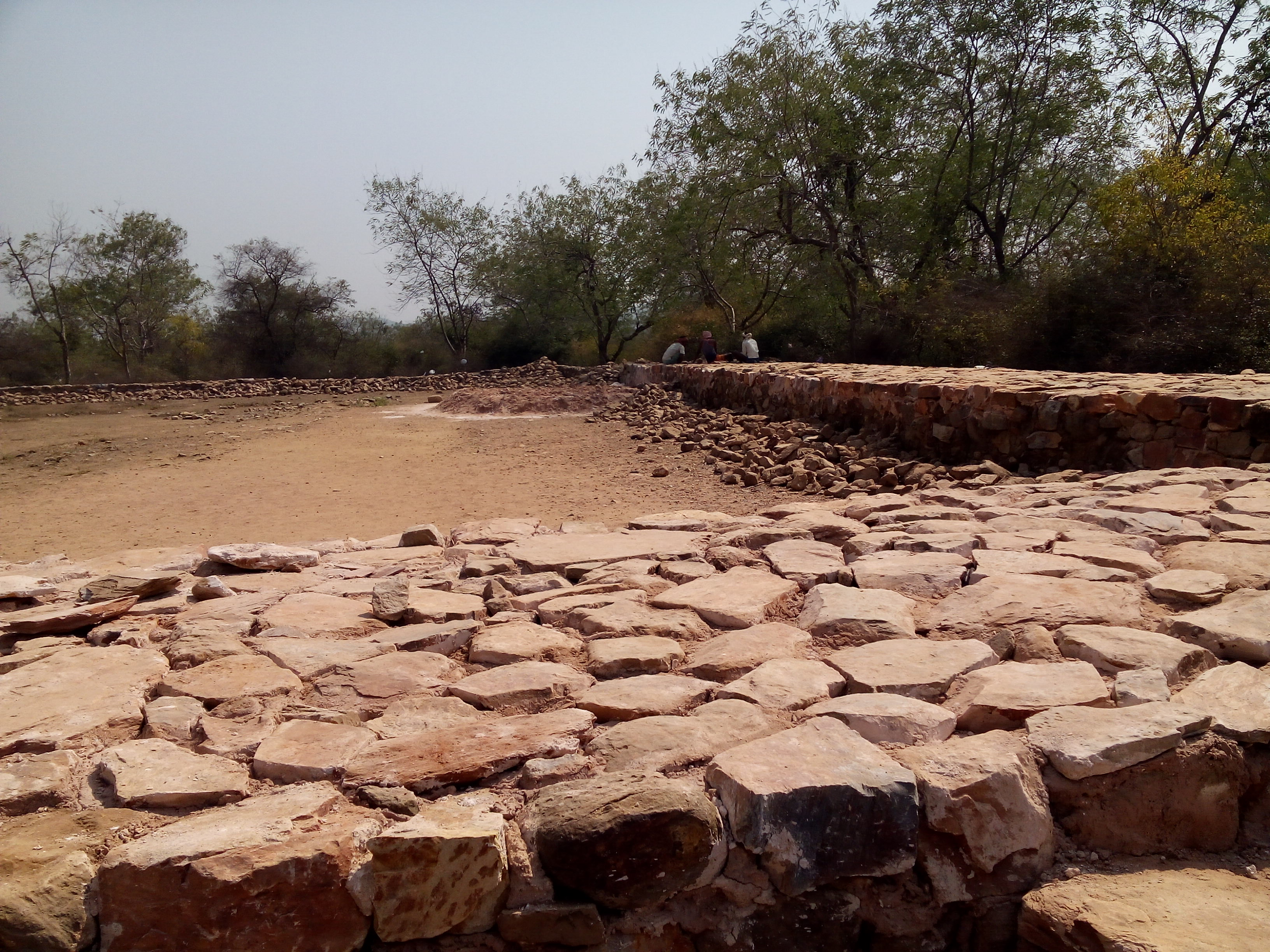
Bimbisara jail where king Bimbisara kept in custody by his own son king Ajatashatru

According to Dīgha nikāya, Ajatashatru was born to King Bimbisara and Queen Kosala Devi, who was the daughter of "Maha-Kosala", (the king of Kosala) and sister of "Pasenadi" who later succeeded to the throne. Ajatashatru had 500 wives but the principal consort was Princess Vajira. The City of Kasi was given to Bimbisara as dowry by Maha-Kosala. After the murder of Bimbisara, Prasenajit took the city back. This resulted in a war between Ajatashatru and Prasenajit. The war ended in a peace treaty in which Prasenajit married his daughter Vajira to him. Ajatashatru later had a son named Udayabhadda or Udayabhadra.

== Death ==
The account of Ajatashatru's death recorded by the Buddhist "long chronology" is c. 461 BCE. The account of his death differs widely between Jain and Buddhist traditions. Other accounts point towards almost a century later as the year of his death.

== Religion ==
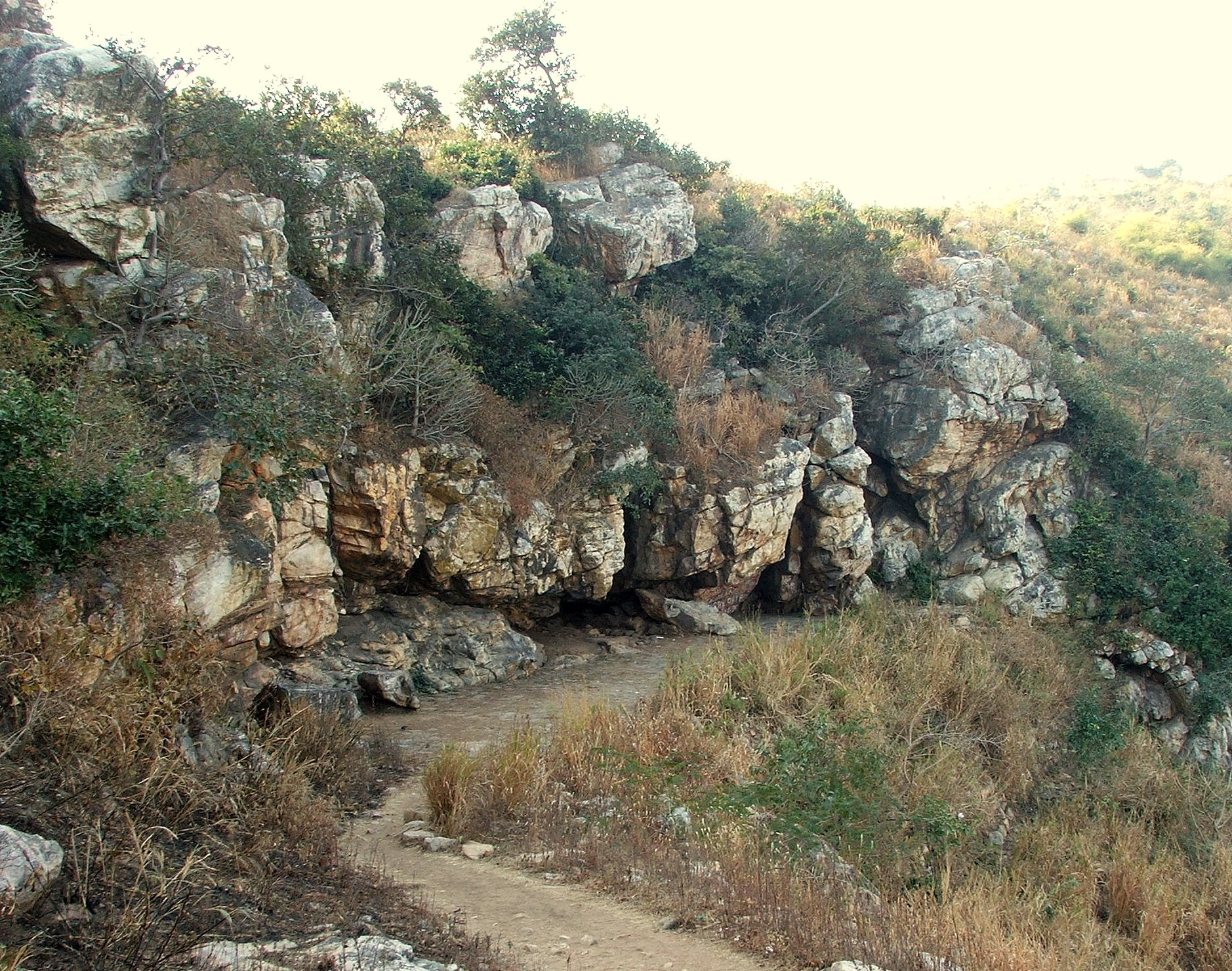
The Sattapanni cave in which the first Buddhist council held was sponsored by King Ajatashatru.

Ajatashatru is mentioned in both Jaina and Buddhist traditions.

The Uvavai/Aupapātika sutta, which is the first Upānga (see Jain Agamas) of the Jains throws light on the relation between Mahavira and Ajatashatru. It accounts that Ajatashatru held Mahavira in the highest esteem. The same text also states that Ajatashatru had an officer to report to him about the daily routine of Mahavira. He was paid lavishly. The officer had a vast network and supporting field staff through whom he collected all the information about Mahavira and reported to the king. The Uvavai Sutta has detailed and illuminating discussion on Mahavira's arrival at the city of Champa, the honor was shown to him by Ajatashatru, the sermon given by Mahavira in Ardhamagadhi language, etc.

According to Buddhist tradition, the Samaññaphala Sutta deals with his first meeting with the Buddha, where he realized his mistakes with his association to Devadatta and planning to killing his own father. According to the same text, during this meeting, Ajatashatru took protection of the Buddha, the Dhamma and the Sangha. He was mentioned more than once in several other Sutta as an example of strong devotee to the Buddha, the Dhamma, and the Sangha. He erected a vast Stupa on the bones and ashes of the Buddha after the funeral, and Ajatashatru also was present in the first Buddhist council at the Sattapanni (Saptparni) caves Rajgriha.

In Mahayana Buddhism, Ajatashatru plays a significant soteriological role. He appears in the Mahayana Mahaparinirvana Sutra as a being completely overtaken by evil and suffering, and as such the prototype of an ordinary, sinful person who can only be saved by the Buddha's compassion; the Buddha even declares in this sutra that he will "remain in the world for the sake of Ajatashatru". This episode, along with the broader theme of the Age of Dharma Decline, informed several Mahayana schools' emphasis on faith rather than accumulating merit.

== Depictions in popular culture ==
- A fictionalised account of Ajatashatru – depicted as a physically gross and tyrannical figure, who delights in committing atrocities and massacres – appears in Gore Vidal's novel Creation.
- He features as the protagonist in the film Amrapali (1966), where he is played by Sunil Dutt with Vyjayanthimala in the titular role of Amrapali.
- A book about his life was written titled Ajatashatru, by Subba Rao.

== See also ==
- Jain Agamas (Śvētāmbara)
- Samaññaphala Sutta
- Maharaja Ajasath, a biographical Sinhala-language film about Ajatashatru
- Avanti-Magadhan Wars

Regnal titles
Preceded by Bimbisara	Ajatashatru; 493 BCE–461 BCE	Succeeded by Udayabhadra
