= Kosal =

Kosal may refer to:

- Kosal state movement, campaign for Western Odisha to be a separate state.
- Kosala (disambiguation), historical regions in India
- Western Odisha, western part of Odisha state
- Kosal Horizon, an English weekly publication based in Sundergarh district, Odisha

== See also ==
- Kosali (disambiguation)
- Kosel (disambiguation)
- Koshala
- Kaushal
