= Kosala Devi =

First wife of king Bimbisara

- Princess of Kashi

Queen Consort of Magadha
- Predecessor: Unknown
- Successor: Vajira
- Spouse: Bimbisara
- Issue: Ajatashatru
- Dynasty: Haryanka (by marriage); Ikshvaku (by birth)
- Father: King Maha-Kosala
- Religion: Buddhism

Kosala Devī was Queen consort of Magadha as the first wife of King Bimbisara (558–491 BC). She was born a princess of Kashi and was the sister of King Prasenajit. Her first name is Bhadra-śrī.

== Life ==
Kosala Devī was born to the King of Kosala, Maha-Kosala. She was the sister of King Prasenajit who succeeded her father as the ruler of Kosala. She was married to King Bimbisara, and brought the city of Kashi as dowry in the marriage. She became his principal queen.

Buddhist tradition makes Ajatashatru a son of hers; the Jain tradition make him a son of her husband's second wife, Chellana. Her niece, Princess Vajira, the daughter of Pasenadi (Prasenjit) was given in marriage to Ajatashatru.

When her husband Bimbisara died at the hands of his own son Ajatashatru, Queen Kosala Devi has said to have died of grief out of her love for her husband. The government revenues of an estate in Kashi had been settled upon by her father as pin money on her marriage. At her death, the payment of course ceased. Ajatashatru then invaded Kashi.
