= List of active separatist movements in Asia =

This is a list of active separatist movements in Asia. Separatism can include autonomism and secessionism, despite the fact that independence is the primary goal of many separatist movements. Many separatist movements arise as a result of religious, racial, social, and cultural disparities between certain peoples and the majority or ruling class in a country.

== Criteria ==
What is and is not considered an autonomist or secessionist movement is sometimes contentious. Entries on this list must meet three criteria:

1. They are active movements with active members.
2. They are seeking greater autonomy or self-determination for a geographic region (as opposed to personal autonomy).
3. They are citizens/people of the conflict area and do not come from another country.

Under each region listed is one or more of the following:

- De facto state (de facto entity): for unrecognized regions with de facto autonomy. (Excluding Uncontacted peoples)
- Proposed state: proposed name for a seceding sovereign state.
- Proposed autonomous area: for movements towards greater autonomy for an area but not outright secession.
  - De facto autonomous government: for governments with de facto autonomous control over a region.
  - Government-in-exile: for a government based outside of the region in question, with or without control.
  - Political party (or parties): for political parties involved in a political system to push for autonomy or secession.
  - Militant organisation(s): for armed organisations.
  - Advocacy group(s): for non-belligerent, non-politically participatory entities.
  - Ethnic/ethno-religious/racial/regional/religious group(s).

== Afghanistan ==
The region of Afghan Turkestan

South Turkestan

- Ethnic group: Uyghurs, Tajiks, Uzbeks, Turkmens, and other Turkic peoples
  - Proposed state: Southern Turkestan
  - Militant organisations: Turkestan Freedom Tigers

Hazarajat/Hazaristan

- Ethnic group: Hazara people
  - Proposed: self determination for Hazarajat
  - Political party: Hazarajat freedom movement

Bactria or Khorasan

- Ethnic group: Tajiks and Uzbeks
  - Proposed state: Bactria or Khorasan
  - Advocacy group: Movement for the Right to Self-Determination of Persian-Speaking People

== Armenia ==
Map of Zangezur within modern borders in red color.

Goycha and Zangezur

- Ethnic group: Western Azerbaijanis
  - Proposed state: Goycha-Zangezur Republic
  - Advocacy group: Western Azerbaijan Society

== Bangladesh ==
Chittagong Hill Tracts in Bangladesh

Chittagong Hill Tracts

- Ethnic group: Jumma people
  - Proposed: Autonomy for the Chittagong Hill Tracts
  - Political parties: Parbatya Chattagram Jana Samhati Samiti, United People's Democratic Front

Zale'n-gam

- Ethnic group: Kuki
  - Proposed state: Zale'n-gam
  - Militant organisation: Kuki National Army, Kuki-Chin National Front
  - Advocacy group: Kuki National Organisation

Zogam (Parts of Chittagong hill tracts)

- Ethnic group: Zomi
  - Proposed state: Zogam
  - Militant organisation: Zomi Revolutionary Army

Bandarban district

- Ethnic group: Mro people
  - Proposed: autonomy for the Mro people

Sylhet Division

- Ethnic group: Khasi people
  - Proposed: autonomy for the Khasi people in Sylhet Division

== China ==
Xinjiang Uygur Autonomous Region of the People's Republic of China

Xinjiang Uygur Autonomous Region

- Ethnic group: Uyghurs
  - Proposed state: East Turkestan
  - Government-in-exile: East Turkistan Government-in-Exile
  - Militant organizations: Turkistan Islamic Party, East Turkestan Liberation Organization
  - Advocacy group: World Uyghur Congress, Campaign For Uyghurs, East Turkistan National Awakening Movement

Hong Kong Special Administrative Region of the People's Republic of China

Hong Kong

- Ethnic group: Han Chinese of Hong Kong
  - Proposed state: Hong Kong or reunification with the United Kingdom as a Dependent Territory
  - Political parties: Youngspiration, Hong Kong Indigenous, Hong Kong National Party, Alliance of Resuming British Sovereignty over Hong Kong and Independence, Hong Kong Independence Party

Xizang Autonomous Region of the People's Republic of China

Tibet

- Ethnic group: Tibetan people
  - Proposed state: Tibet (includes all of Xizang and parts of Qinghai, Sichuan, Gansu, and Yunnan)
  - Government-in-exile: Central Tibetan Administration
  - Advocacy groups: Tibetan Youth Congress, International Tibet Independence Movement (Note: The Tibetan independence movement can either encompass the smaller Tibetan Autonomous Region (Xizang) or the larger "Greater Tibet".)

=== Minor movements ===
- Shanghainese nationalism
- Inner Mongolian independence movement
- Manchuria Independence Movement
- Guangxi independence movement
- Yunnan independence movement
- Guangdong Independence Movement

== Georgia ==
Georgian administrative divisions are outlined in black. Occupied territories of Georgia are shown in pink.

Territory of the former Abkhaz Autonomous Soviet Socialist Republic

- Ethnic group: Abkhazians
  - De facto state: Abkhazia (recognized by 5 UN members)
    - Political organization: Government of Abkhazia
    - Militant organization: Abkhazian Armed Forces

Territory of the former South Ossetian Autonomous Oblast

- People: Ossetians
  - De facto state: South Ossetia (recognized by 5 UN members)
  - Proposition: Recognition of South Ossetia as an independent state or unification with Russia or unification with North Ossetia to form a united independent Ossetia
    - Political organisation: Government of South Ossetia
    - Militant organisation: Armed Forces of South Ossetia

Javakheti

- Ethnic group: Armenians in Samtskhe–Javakheti
  - Proposed: Autonomy for the region Javakhk (Javakheti) or unification with Armenia
  - Political party: United Javakhk Democratic Alliance

== India ==
Separatist movements

Nagaland

- Proposed state: Nagalim
  - Ethnic group: Naga people
  - Militant organization: National Socialist Council of Nagaland

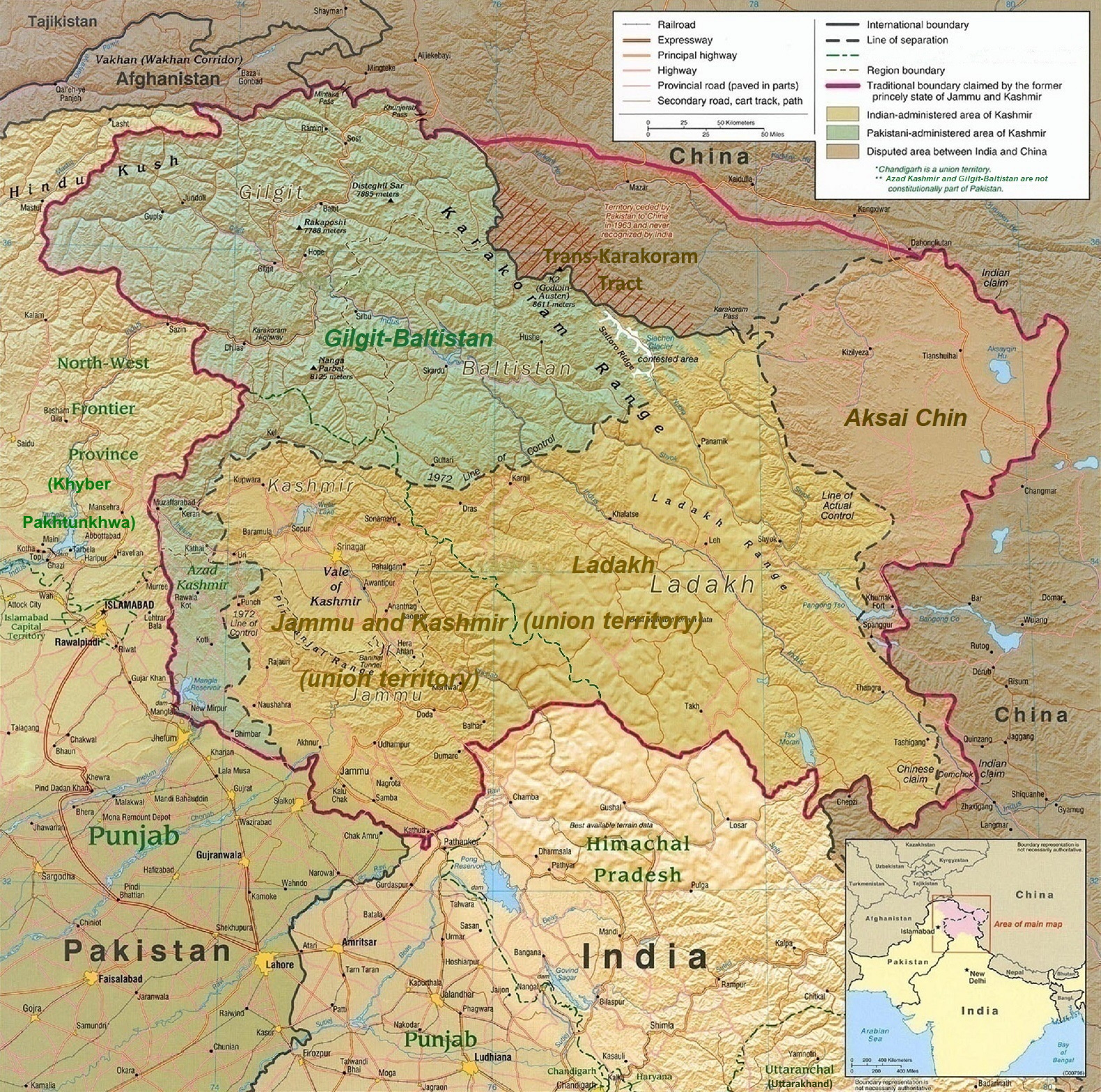
Political map of the Kashmir region districts, showing the Pir Panjal range and the Kashmir Valley or Vale of Kashmir.

Kashmir

- Proposed: independence or autonomy for Jammu and Kashmir from India or unification with Pakistan
  - Ethnic group: Kashmiris
  - Political organizations: All Parties Hurriyat Conference, Jammu & Kashmir Ittihadul Muslimeen
  - Political parties (autonomy): Jammu and Kashmir People's Conference, Jammu and Kashmir Peoples Democratic Party, Jammu & Kashmir National Conference
  - Militant organizations: Lashkar-e-Taiba, Hizbul Mujahideen, Jaish-e-Mohammed, Jammu Kashmir Liberation Front

Kamtapur

- Proposed state: Kamtapur or becoming a state of India
  - Ethnic group: Rajbanshi people
  - Political parties (statehood): Kamtapur People's Party
  - Militant organization: Kamtapur Liberation Organisation

Kukiland

- Proposed state: Zale'n-gam
  - Ethnic group: Kuki, Bnei Menashe
  - Militant organisation: Kuki National Army
  - Advocacy group: Kuki National Organisation

Manipur

- Proposed state: Manipur
  - Ethnic groups: Meitei, Pangal, Naga
  - Government-in-exile: Manipur State Council
  - Militant organizations: United National Liberation Front, People's Liberation Army of Manipur, Kangleipak Communist Party, People's Revolutionary Party of Kangleipak, Kanglei Yawol Kanna Lup, Maoist Communist Party of Manipur

Zogam (In India the claimed territories are: Barak Valley, Tripura, East Jaintia Hills, Dima Hasao district and Karbi Anglong district of Assam)

- Ethnic group: Zomi
  - Proposed state: Zogam
  - Militant organisation: Zomi Revolutionary Army

Punjab, India

- Proposed state: Khalistan
  - Ethnic group: Punjabis
  - Political organizations: Dal Khalsa, Sikhs for Justice, Waris Punjab De
  - Political parties: Akali Dal (Waris Punjab De), Shiromani Akali Dal (Amritsar)
  - Militant organizations: Babbar Khalsa, Khalistan Commando Force, Khalistan Liberation Force, Khalistan Zindabad Force, Khalistan Tiger Force, ISYF, AISSF

== Indonesia ==
Map of native ethnic groups of Indonesia. Foreign ethnic groups are not shown.

Aceh

- Ethnic group: Acehnese
  - Proposed state: Aceh
  - Militant organisation: Free Aceh Movement (negotiated peace with the Indonesian government in 2005, and now it is a civil movement, but the separatism still has supporters)
  - Advocacy group: Aceh–Sumatra National Liberation Front (member of the Unrepresented Nations and Peoples Organization)

Bali

- Ethnic group: Balinese
  - Proposed autonomous area or state: Bali
  - Advocacy group: Bali Government, ForBALI

Banten and West Java

- Ethnic group: Sundanese
  - Proposed autonomous area or state: Pasundan
  - Advocacy group: Free Pasundan Movement

Kalimantan

- Ethnic group: Dayaks
  - Proposed autonomous area or state: Kalimantan

Maluku

- Ethnic group: Moluccans
  - Proposed state: South Maluku
  - Government-in-exile: Republic of South Maluku (member of the Unrepresented Nations and Peoples Organization)
  - Advocacy group: Maluku Sovereignty Front

Minahasa Peninsula

- Ethnic group: Minahasan
  - Proposed state: Greater Minahasa
  - Advocacy group: Free Minahasa Movement

Nias Island

- Ethnic group: Nias People
  - Proposed State: Republik Nias Merdeka

Riau

- Ethnic group: Riau Malays
  - Proposed state: Riau or unification with Malaysia
  - Advocacy group: Free Riau Movement

Sumbawa

- Ethnic group: Sumbawan
  - Proposed autonomous area: Sumbawa

West Timor

- Ethnic Group: Atoni
  - Proposed State: West Timor or Unification with East Timor

== Iran ==
Khūzestān Province

- Ethnic group: Khuzestani Arabs
  - Proposed state: Al-Ahwaz
  - Militant organisations: Al-Ahwaz Arab People's Democratic Popular Front, National Liberation Movement of Ahwaz, Ahwaz Arab Renaissance Party, Ahwaz Liberation Organisation, Arab Struggle Movement for the Liberation of Ahwaz
  - Advocacy group: Democratic Solidarity Party of Al-Ahwaz (member of the Unrepresented Nations and Peoples Organization)

Iranian Kurdistan

- Ethnic groups: Kurds
  - Proposed state: Kurdistan
  - Political parties: Kurdistan Democratic Party of Iran (member of the Unrepresented Nations and Peoples Organization)
  - Militant organisations: Kurdistan Free Life Party, Komala Party of Iranian Kurdistan

Iranian Azerbaijan

- Ethnic groups: Iranian Azerbaijanis
  - Proposed state: South Azerbaijan or unification with Azerbaijan
  - Advocacy group: South Azerbaijan National Awakening Movement, Azerbaijan National Resistance Organization Turkemenshara

Sistan and Baluchestan

- Ethnic group: Balochis
  - Proposed state: Balochistan in Sistan and Baluchestan province with Pakistani Balochistan and Baloch majority territories in Southern Afghanistan
  - Militant organisations: Jundallah (until 2011), People's Fighters Front ( Jaish ul-Adl,), Ansar Al-Furqan

== Iraq ==
Iraqi Kurdistan

Proposed state: Kurdistan

- Ethnic group: Kurds
- Current de jure and de facto autonomous region: Iraqi Kurdistan
  - Political parties: Kurdistan Independence Movement, Kurdistan Democratic Party of Iraq, Patriotic Union of Kurdistan (members of the Unrepresented Nations and Peoples Organization)
  - Militant organisation: Peshmerga

Assyria

- Proposed autonomous area: Nineveh Plains
  - Ethnic group: Assyrians, Christians in Iraq, Mandaeans
    - Proposed state: Assyria
    - Political parties: Assyrian Democratic Movement, Assyrian Universal Alliance (member of the Unrepresented Nations and Peoples Organization), Assyria Liberation Party
    - Militant organisation: Nineveh Plain Protection Units
    - Advocacy groups: Assyrian General Conference, Assyria Council of Europe
- Proposed autonomous area: Al-Rafidain Autonomous Region
  - Ethnic groups: Assyrians, Turkmen, Yazidis
    - Political parties: Turkmen Rescue Foundation, Yazidi Independent Supreme Council and the Al-Rafidain Organization

Proposed state: Basra

- Current de jure and de facto autonomous region: Basra Governorate
  - Proposal: Basra has proposed uniting with the Dhi Qar and Maysan governorates as an autonomous region or total independence

Turkmeneli

- Ethnic group: Iraqi Turkmen
  - Proposed autonomous region or state: Turkmeneli
  - Political party: Iraqi Turkmen Front (member of the Unrepresented Nations and Peoples Organization)

Sinjar District

- Ethnic group: Yazidis
  - Proposal: autonomy for the Sinjar region, including the Sinjar Mountains
  - Political parties: Yazidi Movement for Reform and Progress, Sinjar Alliance

Sunnis in Iraq

- Religious group: Sunnis
  - Proposed: creation of an autonomous Sunni region within Iraq

Al-Zubair District

- Proposed: elevating in the Al-Zubair District into a province

South Iraq

- Religious group: Shiites
  - Proposed: autonomy for south Iraq

== Japan ==
Okinawa

- Ethnic group: Ryukyuan
  - Proposed state or autonomous area: Republic of Ryukyu or Ryukyu Kingdom
  - Political parties: Kariyushi Club, formerly Ryūkyū Independence Party (琉球独立党, Ryūkyū Dokuritsutō)
  - Political groups: Ryukyu independence movement
  - Note: The supporters of the movement want the Amami Islands in Kagoshima Prefecture, former part of the defunct Ryukyu Kingdom until 1609, to be part of independent Ryukyu.

== Kazakhstan ==
Map of North Kazakhstan

North Kazakhstan Region and other ethnic Russian parts of Kazakhstan

- ethnic group: Russians in Kazakhstan
  - proposed: Petropavlovsk People’s Soviet

Mangystau Region

- Ethnic group: Kazakhs
  - Proposed state: Adaistan

Kyzylorda Region

- Ethnic group: Koryo-saram
  - Proposed: autonomy for the Koryo-saram

== Laos ==
Northern Laos

- Ethnic group: Hmong people
  - Proposed state or autonomous area: ChaoFa Hmong
  - Organization: Congress of World Hmong People

== Malaysia ==
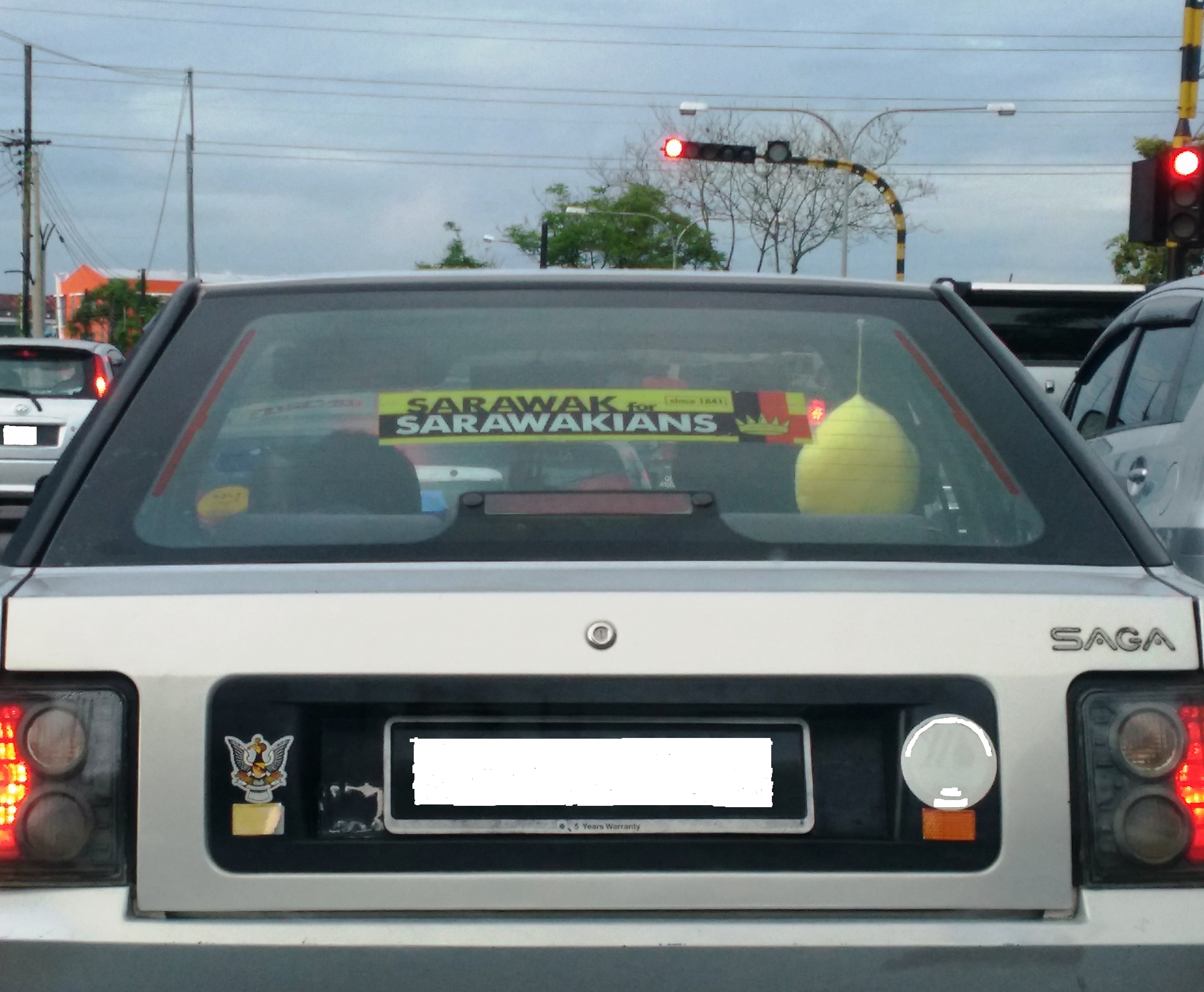
A "Sarawak for Sarawakians" car sticker in Sibu incorporating elements of a Sarawak state with the pre-Malaysian flag

Johor

- Ethnic groups: Johor Malays and Johoreans
  - proposed state: Johor

Sabah

- Ethnic groups: Chinese and indigenous people, (See Demographics of Sabah)
- Proposed state: Sabah
  - Advocacy groups: Borneo Heritage Foundation (BHF), Sabah Sarawak Keluar Malaysia (SSKM), Republic of Sabah North Borneo (RSNB)

Sarawak

- Ethnic groups: Chinese and indigenous people, (See Demographics of Sarawak)
- Proposed state: Sarawak
  - Advocacy groups: Borneo Heritage Foundation (BHF), Sarawak For Sarawakian Big Team (S4S Big Team), Sarawak Association of People's Aspirations (SAPA), Sarawak Sovereignty Movement, Sabah Sarawak Keluar Malaysia (SSKM), Sarawak Liberation Movement
  - Political parties: Parti Bumi Kenyalang

== Myanmar ==
Ethnolinguistic groups of Myanmar.

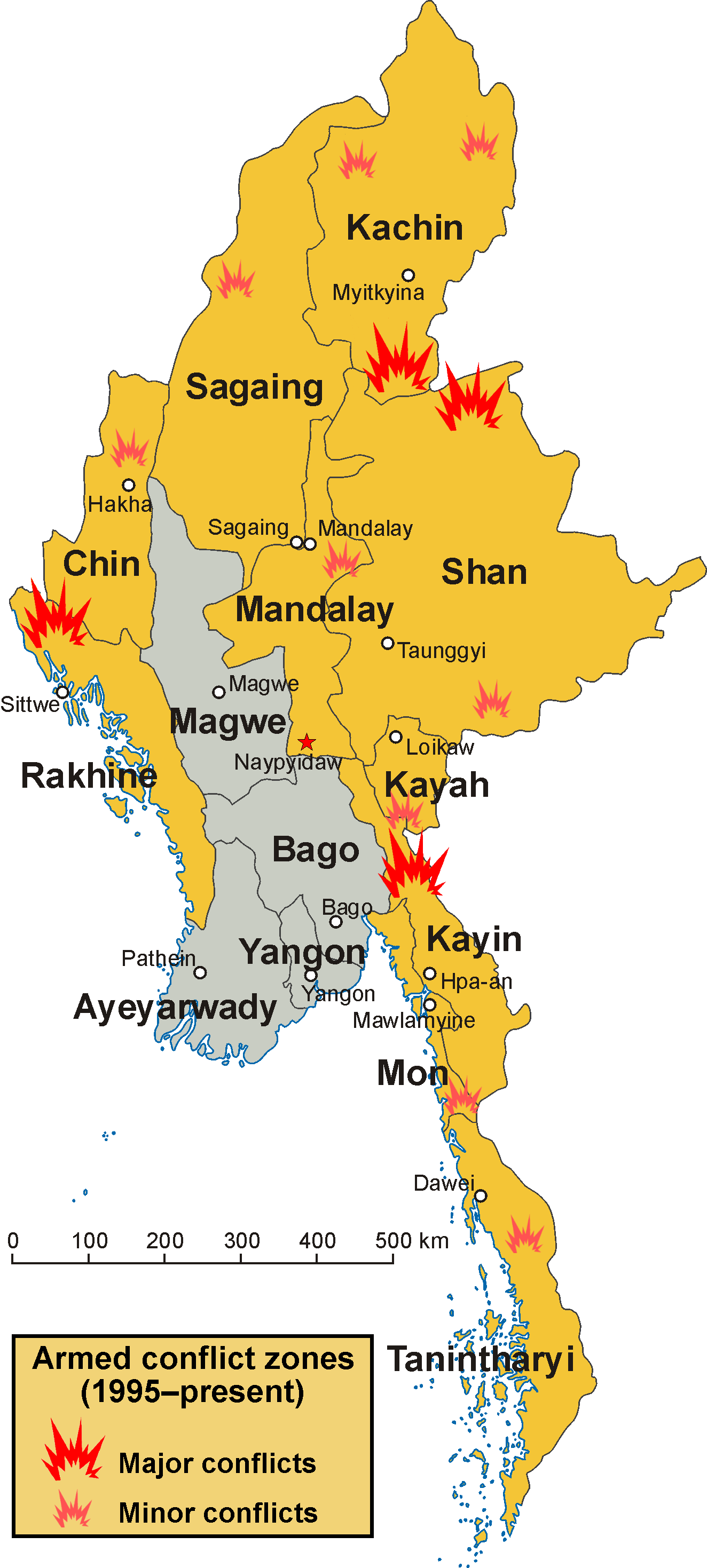
Map of conflict zones in Myanmar. States and regions affected by fighting during and after 1995 are highlighted in yellow.

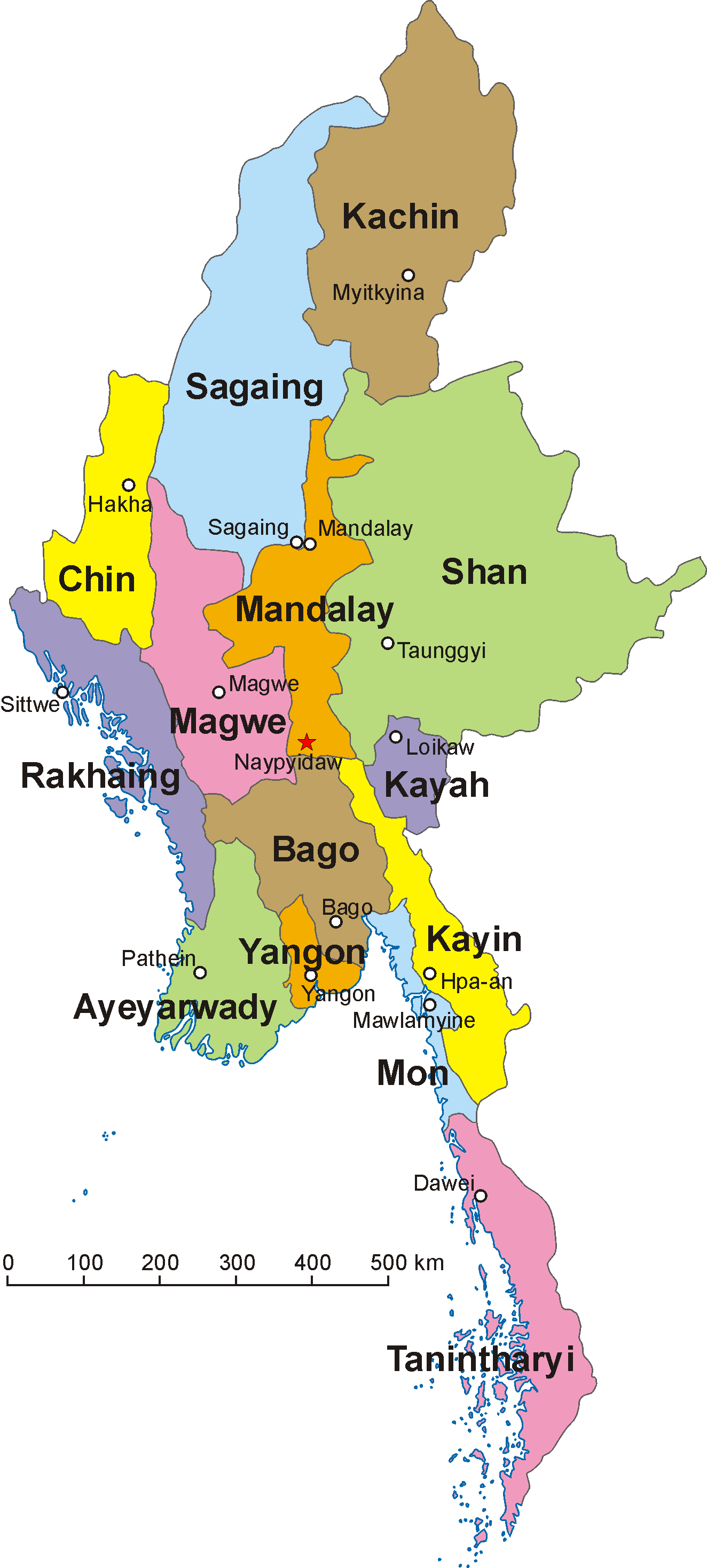
Map of Myanmar and its divisions, including Shan State, Kachin State, Rakhine State, and Karen State.

Arakan

- Ethnic group: Rakhine
  - Proposed state: Arakan State
  - Advocacy groups: Arakan Independence Alliance
  - Militant organizations: Arakan Army (Kayin State)

Arakan

- Ethnic group: Rakhine
  - De facto state: Territory of the Arakan Army
  - Political Party: United League of Arakan
  - Militant organisation: Arakan Army

Chin State

- Ethnic group: Chin
- De Facto State: Chinland
- Political Party: Chin National Front
  - Militant organisation: Chin National Army (member of the Unrepresented Nations and Peoples Organization)

Kachin

- Ethnic group: Kachin
  - proposed state: Kachin
  - De Facto State: Territory of the Kachin Independence Army
  - militant organization: Kachin Independence Army

Kawthoolei

- Ethnic group: Karen
  - Proposed state: Kawthoolei
  - Militant organisation: Karen National Liberation Army
  - Advocacy group: Karen National Union

Karenni

- Ethnic group: Karenni
  - Proposed state: Kayah State
  - Militant organisation: Karenni Army
  - Advocacy group: Karenni National Progressive Party (member of the Unrepresented Nations and Peoples Organization)
  - Government-in-exile: Karenni Provisional Government

Kokang

- Ethnic group: Kokang people (ethnic Han Chinese)
  - Proposed state: Kokang
  - De Facto State: People's Government of Kokang
  - Militant organisation: Myanmar National Democratic Alliance Army

Mon State

- Ethnic group: Mon
  - Proposed state: Mon State, Monland
  - Political party: New Mon State Party

Nagaland

- Proposed state: Nagalim
  - Ethnic group: Naga people
  - Militant organization: National Socialist Council of Nagaland

Northern Rakhine State

- Ethnic group: Rohingya
  - Militant organisation: Arakan Rohingya Army, Arakan Rohingya Salvation Army, Rohingya Solidarity Organization
  - Advocacy groups: Arakan Rohingya National Organisation, Rohingya National Council

Shan States

- Ethnic group: Shan (member of the Unrepresented Nations and Peoples Organization)
  - Proposed state: Shan Republic
  - Political party: Shan Democratic Union
  - Militant organisation: Shan State Army
  - Advocacy group: Restoration Council of Shan State
  - Government in exile: Interim Government of Federated Shan States

Pa'O

- Proposed state: Pa'O Self-Administered Zone
  - Ethnic group: Pa'O
  - Militant organisation: Pa-O National Liberation Army

Palaung

- Proposed state: Pa Laung Self-Administered Zone
- De Facto State: Ta'ang People's Government
  - Ethnic group: Palaung
  - Militant organisation: Palaung State Liberation Army

Wa State

- Ethnic group: Wa
  - Proposed/de facto State: Wa State
  - Political party: United Wa State Party
  - Militant organisation: United Wa State Army

Zale'n-gam

- Ethnic group: Kuki
  - Proposed state: Zale'n-gam
  - Militant organisation: Kuki National Army
  - Advocacy group: Kuki National Organisation

Zogam

- Ethnic group: Zomi
  - Proposed state: Zogam
  - Militant organisation: Zomi Revolutionary Army

Shanni

- Ethnic group: Shanni
  - Proposed: self determination for the Shanni
  - Political party: Shanni Nationalities Army

Magway Region

- Ethnic group: Bamar people
  - Proposed: autonomy for the Bamar people in a federal Myanmar
  - Militant organization: Bamar People's Liberation Army

Danu Self-Administered Zone

- Ethnic group: Danu people
  - Proposed: greater self rule for Danu Self-Administered Zone
  - Militant organization: Danu People's Liberation Army

Lahu people

- Ethnic group: Lahu people
  - Proposed: self determination for Lahu people
  - Political party/militant organization: Lahu Democratic Union

Kayan people

- Ethnic group: Kayan people
  - Proposed: autonomy for the Kayan people
  - Militant organization: Kayan National Army

Daai Chin

- Ethnic group: Daai Chin
  - Proposed: autonomy for the Daai Chin
  - Advocacy group: Daai regional council

== Pakistan ==
Azad Kashmir

- Proposed: secession of Kashmir from Pakistan
  - Ethnic groups: Kashmiri Muslims, Kashmiris
  - Political party: Azad Kashmir Plebiscite Front
  - Student organization: Jammu Kashmir Student Liberation Front
  - Militant organisation: Jammu Kashmir Liberation Front (until 2019)

Gilgit Baltistan

- Proposed: autonomy for Gilgit-Baltistan and declaration as the fifth province of Pakistan or succession into Balawaristan
  - Ethnic groups: Baltis, Shins, Burusho
  - Political party: Balawaristan National Front (Pro-Independence, defunct) and Balawaristan National Front (Naji) (Pro-Autonomy, active)

Balochistan

- Ethnic group: Balochis
  - Proposed state: Balochistan along with Sistan and Baluchestan of Iran and some parts of Afghanistan
  - Political parties: Baloch National Movement, Baloch Republican Party (autonomy and rights only), Free Balochistan Movement (member of the Unrepresented Nations and Peoples Organization)
  - Student organization: Baloch Students Organization (inactive)
  - Militant organisations: Baloch Raaji Aajoi Sangar coalition (2018–present) ( Baloch Liberation Army (2005–present), Baloch Liberation Front (1963–1977, 2000–present)) and Other groups.

Sindh

- Ethnic group: Sindhis
  - Proposed state: Sindhudesh
  - Political parties: Jeay Sindh Qaumi Mahaz, Jeay Sindh Muttahida Mahaz, Sindh United Party
  - Student organization: Jeay Sindh Studdents' Federation
  - Militant organization: Sindhudesh Liberation Army, Sindhudesh People's Army and Sindhudesh Revolutionary Army

Punjab

- Proposed: Southern Punjab be separated into a separate province called Saraikistan in the Saraiki-speaking areas
  - Ethnic group: Saraikis
  - Political party: Saraikistan Qaumi Council, Pakistan Tehreek-e-Insaf, Pakistan Muslim League (Nawaz), and Pakistan People's Party

Khyber Pakhtunkhwa

- Ethnic group: Pashtuns
  - Proposition: Advocating for the regional autonomy and increased Pashtun cultural expression or an independent state called Pashtunistan consisting of the Pashtun parts Khyber Pakhtunkhwa and North Balochistan or accession with Afghanistan
  - Political party: Pashtun Protection Movement (autonomy and rights), Pashtun Social Democratic Party (accession with Afghanistan), Afghan Mellat Party (accession with Afghanistan), Khalq (accession with Afghanistan; inactive) Taliban (accession with Afghanistan)
  - Militant organisations: Tehreek-e-Taliban Pakistan/Pakistani Taliban, Pashtun Zalmay (inactive)

Karachi

- Ethnic group: Muhajirs
  - Proposition: Independence for Jinnahpur or creation of a separate province known as 'Muhajir Sooba' (literally: 'Immigrant Province') for the Muhajir people in Southern Sindh
  - Political Parties: Muttahida Qaumi Movement – London (defunct)
  - Militant organisation: MQM–London (defunct)

Hazarewals

- Ethnic group: Hazarewals
  - Proposed: establishment of a separate Hazara province in Pakistan
  - Advocacy group: Hazara province movement

Kalasha Valleys

- Ethnic group: Kalash people
  - Proposed: a separate province for the Kalasha Valleys

Bahawalpur

- Ethnic group: Saraikis
  - Proposed: creation of a Bahawalpur province within Pakistan

== Palestine ==
Hebron Hills

- Proposed: independence for Hebron

== The Philippines ==
Cordillera

Sulu archipelago and parts of Zamboanga Peninsula

- Ethnic groups: Moro (Tausūg, Banguingui, Sama-Bajau, Yakan)
  - Proposed state/autonomous area: Bangsa Sūg

Cordillera Administrative Region

- Ethnic group: Igorot
  - Proposed autonomous area: Cordillera Autonomous Region or Autonomous Region of the Cordillera
  - Advocacy groups: Autonomy in the Administrative Cordillera Movement, Cordillera People's Liberation Army, Cordillera Bodong Administration

Mindanao

- Ethnic group: Mindanaoans
  - Proposed: independence for Mindanao
  - Advocacy group: Mindanao Independence Movement

Bangsamoro

- Ethnic group: Maguindanao people
  - Proposed state: Bangsamoro
  - Militant organization: Bangsamoro Islamic Freedom Fighters

== Russia ==
Siberia or Siberian Federal District

- Ethnic group: Russians, Siberians (Siberian peoples)
  - Proposed state or federal subject: Siberian Republic
    - Militant organisation: Sibir Battalion of the Civic Council
      - Advocacy groups: Siberian regionalist groups, Civil Council

Buryatia

- Ethnic group: Buryats
  - Proposed state: Buryatia or unification with Mongolia
    - Advocacy groups: Free Buryatia Foundation

Ural Federal District

- Ethnic group: Russians, Siberian Tatars
  - Proposed state: Ural Republic
  - Political parties: Ural Republic Movement, Free Ural, Ural Democratic Foundation

Idel-Ural

- Ethnic groups: Tatars, Bashkirs, Chuvash, Mari, Mordvins, Udmurts
  - Proposed state: Idel-Ural State
  - Political parties: Free Idel-Ural, Idel-Ural National Liberation Movement, Azatliq Radikal Tatar Party

Sakha Republic

- Ethnic group: Yakuts, Evenki people, Evens
  - Proposed state: Yakutia
    - Political party: Foundation Free Yakutia

Tuva

- Ethnic group: Tuvans
  - Proposed state; Republic of Tyva
    - Political parties: People's Party of Sovereign Tuva, People's Front of Tuva

Koryak Okrug

- Ethnic group: Koryak people
  - Proposed: re-establishment of the Koryak Okrug

Green Ukraine

- Ethnic group: Russians, Ukrainians, Tungusic peoples, Koryo-saram, Chinese
  - Proposed: independence for the "Green Wedge"
  - Advocacy group: Far eastern movement

Khakassia

- Ethnic group: Khakas
  - Proposed: independence for Khakassia

Altai

- Ethnic group: Altai people
  - Proposed: independence for Altai

Khanty-Mansi Autonomous Okrug

- Ethnic group: Khanty, Mansi
  - Proposed state: Yugra

Krasnoyarsk Krai

- Ethnic group: Russians, Siberian Tatars, Oirats, Evenki people, Dolgans, Kets, Nganasan, Selkups
  - Proposed state: Yenisei republic

Yamalo-Nenets Autonomous Okrug

- Ethnic group: Nenets
  - Proposed: Independence for the Yamalo-Nenets Autonomous Okrug

Taymyr Autonomous Okrug

- Ethnic group: Dolgans
  - Proposed: reinstatement of the Taymyr Autonomous Okrug

Agin-Buryat Autonomous Okrug

- Ethnic group: Buryats
  - Proposed: re establishment of the Agin-Buryat Autonomous Okrug

Evenkia

- Ethnic group: Evenki people
  - Proposed: re establishment of Evenkia

Jewish Autonomous Oblast

- Ethnic group: Russians and Jews
  - Proposed: independence for the Jewish Autonomous Oblast

Chukotka Autonomous Okrug

- Ethnic group: Chukchi, Kereks, Yupik, Evens, Chuvans
  - Proposed: independence for the Chukotka Autonomous Okrug

Kamchatka Krai

- Ethnic group: Itelmens, Koryaks, Alyutors
  - Proposed: independence for Kamchatka Krai

Yukaghir people

- Ethnic group: Yukaghir people
  - Proposed autonomous region: Suuktul

Amur Oblast

- Ethnic group: Russians
  - Proposed state: Amur

Zabaykalsky Krai

- Ethnic group: Russians
  - Proposed state: Chita Republic

Far Eastern Federal District

- Ethnic group: Russians
  - Proposed state: Far Eastern Republic

Irkutsk Oblast

- Ethnic group: Russians
  - Proposed state: Irkutsk

== Syria ==
De facto autonomous region:

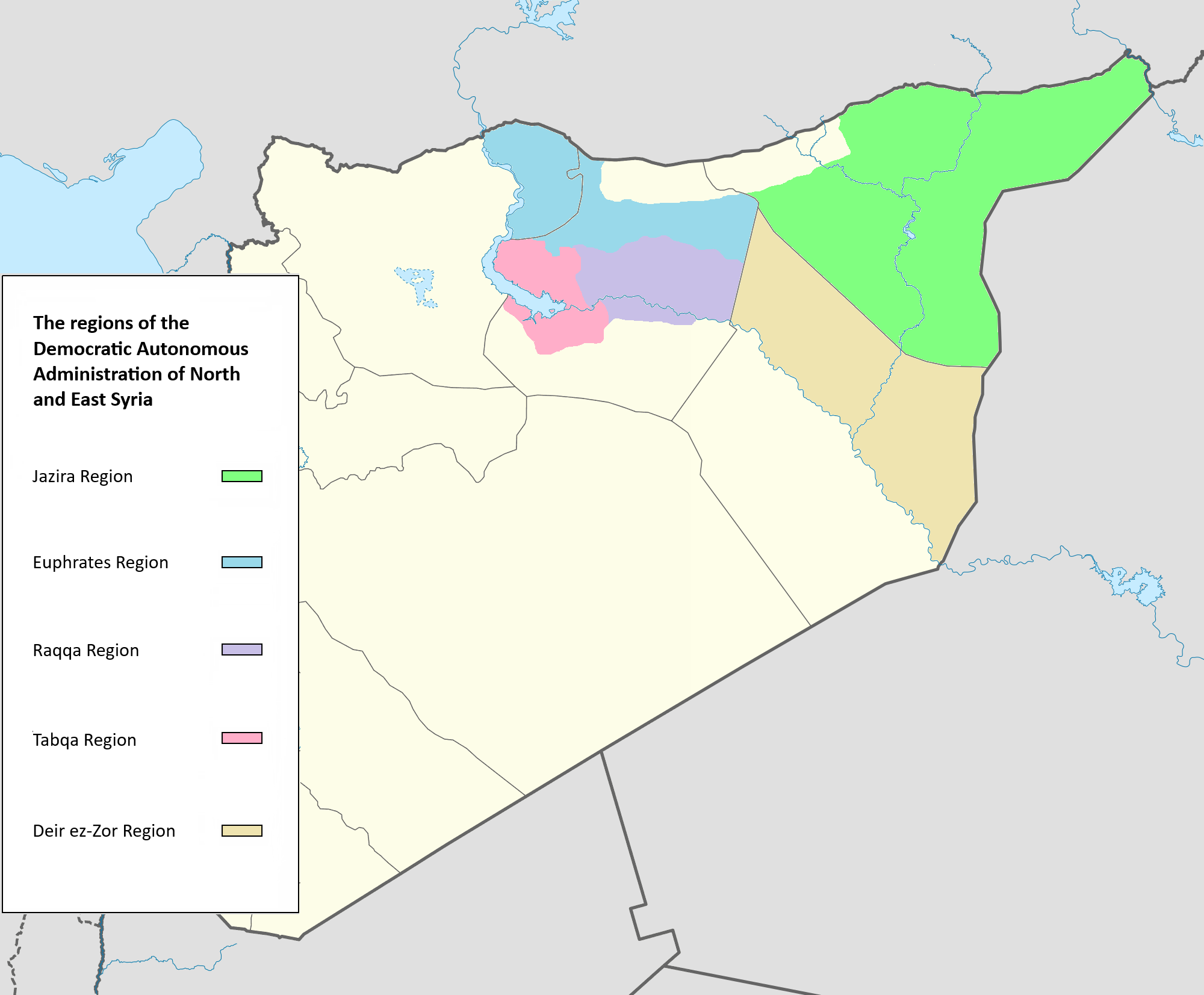
Autonomous Administration of North and East Syria (Rojava)

Democratic Autonomous Administration of North and East Syria (Rojava)

- Larger ethnic groups: Kurds, Arabs, Assyrians
- Smaller ethnic groups: Armenians, Turkmen, Yazidis, Circassians, Christians
  - Political organisation: Syrian Democratic Council
  - Militant organisation: Syrian Democratic Forces

Autonomist movements:

Druze

- Ethnic group: Druze
  - Proposed Autonomous Region: Jabal Druze State (Suwayda Governorate) or unification with Israel (Quneitra Governorate)
  - Political organisation: Administrative Council of Jabal Bashan (since 2026)
  - Militant organisation: National Guard

Assyria

- Ethnic group: Assyrians, Christians in Syria
  - Proposed state: Assyria
  - Political parties: Syriac Union Party, Assyrian Democratic Organization
  - Militant organisations: Syriac Military Council, Sutoro
  - Advocacy groups: Assyria Council of Europe,

Latakia Governorate and Tartus Governorate

- Ethnic group: Alawites
  - Proposed: establishment of an autonomous Alawite state in Syria
  - Advocacy group: Alawite Party

== Taiwan ==
The Republic of China (ROC), commonly known as Taiwan, is a state that has diplomatic relations with 11 United Nations member states (as well as the Holy See, an observer).

Taiwan

- Proposed state: Republic of Taiwan
  - Movement: Taiwan independence movement, Taiwanese nationalism
    - Note: The Democratic Progressive Party (DPP) has been democratically elected to power in Taiwan five times; in 2000 (until 2004), in 2004 (until 2008), in 2016 (until 2020), in 2020 (until 2024), and in 2024 (until 2028). Although the DPP has been the nominal ruling party of the Republic of China throughout these four ruling terms, the DPP has been pushing a pro-Taiwan independence agenda, whether tacitly or overtly. Some representatives of the DPP, such as Lai Ching-te, argue that Taiwan independence should not even be considered an "independence movement" but is rather the recognition of the reality of the current situation of the Republic of China on Taiwan. Many supporters of Taiwan independence believe that Taiwan, under the formal name of the "Republic of China", is already an independent country from mainland China, under the formal name of the "People's Republic of China". Some groups also exclude the Kinmen and Matsu Islands from their proposal.
  - Political parties: Pan-Green Coalition (Democratic Progressive Party, Taiwan Solidarity Union, Taiwan Independence Party), New Power Party, Taiwan Statebuilding Party
  - Advocacy groups: Keep Taiwan Free (Taiwanese organisation), World United Formosans for Independence

Taiwanese indigenous peoples

- Ethnic group: Native Taiwanese
  - Proposed: autonomy for the indigenous peoples of Taiwan
  - Political party: Taiwan First Nations Party

== Thailand ==
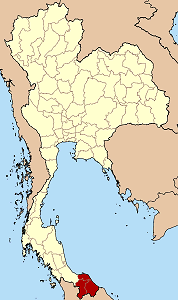
Map of the Patani region

Patani

- Ethnic group: Patani Malays
  - Proposed state: Pattani Darul Makrif, unification with Malaysia
  - Militant organisation: Patani United Liberation Organisation, Patani Malays National Revolutionary Front, Runda Kumpulan Kecil, Pattani Islamic Mujahideen Movement, Islamic Liberation Front of Patani
  - Advocacy group: Pelajar Bangsa

Isan

- Ethnic group: Isan people
  - Proposed: autonomy for Isan
  - Advocacy group: New Isan Movement

Northern Thailand

- Ethnic group: Northern Thai people
  - Proposed: autonomy for Northern Thailand/Lan Na

== Turkey ==
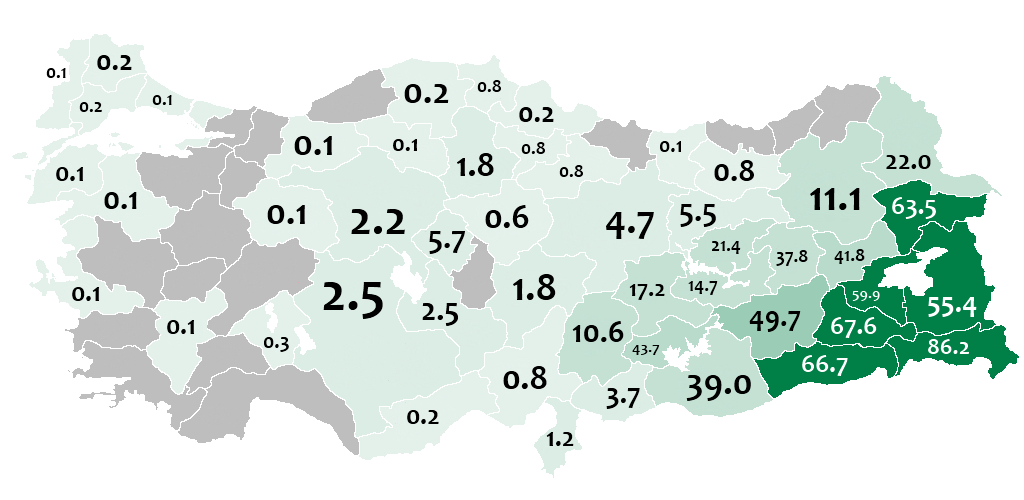
Map showing Kurdish-speaking areas within Turkey, as per the 1965 census.

Northern Kurdistan

- Ethnic group: Kurds
  - Proposed state: Kurdistan
  - Militant organisations: Democrat Party of Kurdistan/North (PDK/Bakur), Revolutionary Party of Kurdistan (PŞK), Communist Party of Kurdistan (KKP)

Assyria

- Ethnic group: Assyrians, Arab Christians
  - Proposed state: Assyria
  - Political parties: Assyrian Democratic Movement, Assyria Liberation Party
  - Militant organisations: Nineveh Plain Protection Units, Dwekh Nawsha
  - Advocacy groups: Assyrian General Conference, Assyria Council of Europe

Western Armenia

- Ethnic group: Armenians
  - Proposed state: Western Armenia or merger with Armenia
  - Government in Exile: Western Armenia Government in Exile
  - Political parties: Armenian Revolutionary Federation, Sasna Tsrer Pan-Armenian Party
  - Advocacy groups: Armenian National Committee of America

Zazaistan

- Ethnic group: Zazas
  - Proposed state: Zazaistan
    - Political parties: Democracy Time Party
    - Advocacy groups: Federation of Zaza Associations

Pontus

- Ethnic group: Pontic Greeks
  - Proposed state: Pontus

== Turkmenistan ==
Balkan Region

- Ethnic group: Turkmen people
  - Proposed state: Yomudistan

== United Arab Emirates ==
Sharjah

- Ethnic group: Arabs
  - Proposed: secession of Sharjah from the UAE
  - Advocacy group: Ruler of Sharjah

Umm al-Quwain

- Ethnic group: Arabs
  - Proposed state: Umm al-Quwain

== Uzbekistan ==
Karakalpakstan

- ethnic group: Karakalpaks
  - proposed state: Karakalpakstan

== Vietnam ==
Central Highlands (Vietnam)

- Ethnic group: Montagnard
  - Proposed: autonomy or independence of the Montagnard
  - Political organisations: Montagnard Foundation, Inc., Montagnard Dega Association, Montagnard Human Rights Organization, United Montagnard People, M'Nong Bu-dang, Movement for the Unity of Ethnic Groups of South Viet-Nam

Hmong state

- Ethnic group: Hmong people
  - Proposed state or autonomous area: ChaoFa Hmong

Mekong Delta and South East Vietnam

- Ethnic group: Khmer Krom
  - Proposed: Autonomy for the Khmer Krom or unification with Cambodia
  - Political party: Khmers Kampuchea-Krom Federation

== Yemen ==
Yemen prior to unification

- Proposed state: State of South Arabia
  - Political parties: Southern Movement
  - Regional groups: Southern Yemenis, Mahris and Soqotrans

Map of the proposed Hadhramaut Region in green

- Proposed autonomous area: Hadhramaut Region
  - Political parties: Hadramout National Council, Hadhramaut Tribal Alliance, Hadhrami League,
  - Regional groups: Hadharem, Mahris and Soqotrans

== See also ==
- Lists of active separatist movements
- List of historical separatist movements
- Autonomous administrative division
