= Hadhrami League =

Self-determination movement

- العصبة الحضرمية
- Emblem of the Hadhrami League
- Leader: Abdullah Saeed Bahaj
- Dates active: 2003–present
- Active regions: Yemen
- Ideology: Self-determination or Separatism

Flag of the Hadhrami League

The Hadhrami League (Arabic: العصبة الحضرمية, romanized: al-ʿusbah al-ḥaḍramiyah) is an independence movement founded in 2003 by Abdullah Saeed Bahaj, under the name of the National Organization for the Liberation of Hadhramaut, and calls for the self-determination of the Hadharem. The Hadhrami League claims that Hadhramaut is under a "Yemeni occupation".

== See also ==
- National Hadhrami Council
