= Hadhramaut (disambiguation) =

Hadhramaut (Arabic: حَضْرَمَوْت, romanized: Ḥaḍramawt) usually refers to the geographic region in southern Arabia and modern-day Yemen. It may also refer to:

== Political entities ==
- Hadhramaut Region, a proposed federal region of Yemen
- Hadhramaut Governorate, a governorate in Hadhramaut region, Yemen
- Kingdom of Hadhramaut

== Geographic features ==
- Hadhramaut Mountains
- Wadi Hadhramaut

== Political parties ==
- Hadramout National Council
- Hadhramaut Tribal Alliance
