= Shadi Basurra =

Yemeni Minister and academic

Shadi Saleh Basurra is a Yemeni public official, academic, and researcher. He serves as Minister of Telecommunications and Information Technology of Yemen. He has also been active in Yemeni political and public affairs through policy, mediation, civic initiatives, peace efforts, and public engagement on Yemeni issues.

== Political and public career ==
Basurra entered the Yemeni government in February 2026 as Minister of Telecommunications and Information Technology. Since then, he has taken part in ministerial and diplomatic activity connected to telecommunications policy, infrastructure development, digital transformation, and cooperation with regional and international actors.

His political and public roles include being a member of the presidency board of the Hadhramaut National Council (HNC), leadership of Al-Rashid Center in Aden, founding membership in the National Peace Movement, involvement with the executive team of Labour Friends of Yemen, and participation in policy and dialogue initiatives related to Yemen. He has also taken part in mediation and track-two dialogue efforts on the Yemeni crisis with regional and international organisations, including the United Nations and Berghof.

== Academic career ==
Alongside his public role, Basurra has had an academic career in the United Kingdom. He is Professor of Computer Science and Head of the Department of Computer Science at the University of Reading. Before joining Reading, he held senior positions at Birmingham City University, where he served as Professor of Intelligent Systems, led research in artificial intelligence, wireless communications, and telecommunications, and held departmental leadership roles in computing and data science.

He studied in the United Kingdom, earning a BSc in Computer Science from the University of Exeter in 2007, an MSc in Distributed Systems and Networks from the University of Kent in 2008, and a PhD in Computer Science and Engineering from the University of Bath, in collaboration with the University of Bristol in 2013. His work has focused on intelligent systems, artificial intelligence, wireless networks, optimisation, and digital transformation.

Earlier in his career, he worked as a Senior Software Engineer at Sony Europe, contributing to intelligent sports-analysis and officiating systems used in major sporting events. He also held research and teaching positions at the University of Bath and was a visiting researcher at the National Institute of Informatics in Tokyo in 2010.

His academic work has included research leadership and participation in funded projects in retrofit technologies, sustainability, smart buildings, artificial intelligence, and digital systems. His projects include EcRoFit and other research spanning machine learning, intelligent systems, and communications technologies.

== Public appearances ==
Basurra has made public appearances as both an academic and a public official through media interviews, university broadcasts, conference speaking engagements, and public discussions on technology, artificial intelligence, telecommunications, and Yemeni public affairs.

== Awards ==
He has received several awards and honours in recognition of his contributions to computer science, engineering, innovation, and applied research. These include the Yemen President’s National Science Prize in Computer Science (2010),. the West Midlands Tech Award (2022), the Birmingham City University Sparkles Award for Global Computing (2023), and runner-up recognition at the H&V News Awards in London (2025). He has also received a number of other university and technology awards in the United Kingdom
