= Southern Turkestan Movement =

Militant organization

- Founded: 2022
- Country: Afghanistan
- Headquarters: Mazar-e Sharif
- Ideology: Separatism

The Southern Turkestan Movement is a militant group that seeks independence for the Turkic tribesmen in the region of Southern Turkestan in Afghanistan. The group, also known as the Turkestan Freedom Tigers or the Wolf of Jawzjan is believed to be loyal to Yar Mohammad Dostum, the son of General Abdul Rashid Dostum, leader of the National Islamic Movement of Afghanistan. On 29 June 2022, a group of fighters announced the formation of the Movement in a one-minute video circulated on the Internet. The commander of the group explains in the video that they will fight the Taliban and protect the rights of the Turkic peoples. The group is composed of Uyghurs, Uzbeks, Turkmens, and other Turkic peoples.

The Southern Turkestan Movement began its activities on February 8, 2022, with an attack on a Taliban checkpoint in the Qara Kint neighborhood of Sheberghan. Four Taliban members were killed and two others were wounded in the attack. After the clash ended, the attackers wrote the words "Long live the Turkestan Freedom Tigers" on the checkpoint wall and fled the area. The Southern Turkestan Movement is believed to be active in the Jawzjan and Faryab provinces, in Afghanistan. Some experts have suggested that the group may be linked to Turkish intelligence agencies.

Despite its stated goals, the Southern Turkestan Movement has not demonstrated the ability to carry out significant attacks against the Taliban government or to conduct large-scale operations. It is unclear how much support the group has among the local population or what its long-term prospects are for achieving independence.
