= Penang secessionist movement =

Failed secession movement in Penang from 1948 to 1957

Map of present-day Penang, which consists of the island and Seberang Perai, that contained a population of 572,100 as of 1957.

The Penang secessionist movement was a separatist movement whose objective was to achieve the independence of Penang from the Federation of Malaya (now Malaysia). Between 1948 and 1957, the movement was driven by commercial elites, predominantly from non-Malay ethnic backgrounds. It stemmed from concerns that Penang's non-Malay majority would be marginalised under the Ketuanan Melayu agenda and that Penang's economic prospects would be undermined by the new Malayan government. Ultimately, the movement was defeated in Penang's legislature and attempts to garner support from the British government were unsuccessful.

== Background ==
Flag of the Straits Settlements, which Penang was a part of

Flag of the Crown Colony of Penang between 1949 and 1952

Flag of the Crown Colony of Penang between 1952 and 1957

Prior to World War II, the Baba Nyonya community, also known as the "Straits Chinese", wielded significant economic and political influence in Penang, supported by extensive business networks and representation in the settlement's governance. Their allegiance to Britain over China facilitated the expansion of their political influence in George Town, particularly within the city's government and civil service.

The Japanese occupation brought about harsh treatment of Chinese descendants in Penang. After Japan's defeat in 1945, the returning British aimed to consolidate their imperial holdings in the Malay Peninsula into a single political entity. Before the war, Malaya had consisted of various political entities – the crown colony of the Straits Settlements comprising Penang, Malacca and Singapore, the Federated Malay States (FMS), and the unfederated states of Johor, Kelantan, Kedah, Perlis and Terengganu.

The Federation of Malaya was formed in 1949, unifying Penang and Malacca with the federated and unfederated sultanates. Penang, as a British crown colony merged into the Malay-dominated hinterland, received a Settlement Council with local legislative powers equivalent to those of the Malay sultanates. Despite this, authority was centralised in Kuala Lumpur, the federal capital.

At the time of merger, Penang's position was peculiar; it was the only state in the Federation where the ethnic Chinese formed a majority and had the longest history of British rule in Southeast Asia, which resulted in the highest levels of urbanisation and education within the new federation. The federal government imposed stricter citizenship rules for non-Malay residents while automatically granting citizenship to all Malay subjects of the respective sultanates. British subjects in Penang and Malacca had to demonstrate continuous residency for a number of years in either of the settlements to be eligible for federal citizenship. The dissolution of the Straits Settlements and the integration of Penang into the new federation raised concerns among non-Malays regarding the potential diminishment of their political influence and rights, as the federal government sought to expand its legal jurisdiction to Penang.

The imposition of new tariffs and restrictions by Kuala Lumpur exacerbated discontent among the non-Malay elite, as they feared that George Town’s free port status would be eroded and Penang would become the "milking cow" for the poorer states. As early as 1946, the British Military Administration had sought to include Penang into Malaya's customs regime, drawing criticism from the colony's business community. A petition at the time warned that the inclusion of Penang into Malaya's customs union would "reduce it to the churn of filth of a fishing village... trade assiduously built up during the last one and a half centuries will be turned to nothing, entailing untold monetary losses and hardship to the merchants in Penang". In voicing support for greater decentralisation and autonomy from Kuala Lumpur, the Peranakan Chinese expressed the belief that “the needs and claims of Penang are likely to be drowned in the clamour of the ten other members of the federation for their own particular needs and claims”. Suggestions were also put forth to make George Town the capital of the federation, but it was thought that the Malay sultanates were against the idea.

Economic uncertainties and concerns about non-Malay rights under the Ketuanan Melayu agenda had already bred discontent before 1948, with tensions escalating in the months following the federation's establishment. The Emergency erupted in the middle of that year, pitting the Malay-dominated armed forces against communist guerillas whose membership consisted largely of ethnic Chinese. Growing Malay extremism and the perceived British favouritism toward Malay interests deepened the underlying animosity between Malays and Chinese. Trade disruptions resulting from the Emergency and the subsequent inaction by Kuala Lumpur further fueled apprehensions about George Town's prospects as a free port. Ng Sui Cham, a member of the Penang Settlement Advisory Council, remarked in 1947 that "Penang is only in name a free port but actually it has to obey every government whim and fancy".

Meanwhile, Singapore had been excluded from the federation by the British due to economic and military considerations. This was viewed as advantageous to the ethnic Chinese there, who, unlike those in Penang, would not lose its political and economic influence. In the 1948 Singaporean general election, the progressives secured three of the six elective seats. Alarmed by the potential loss of historic trading links with Singapore and drawing inspiration from the political climate there, Penang's Peranakan Chinese began advocating for an independent Penang. "I really cannot understand the desirability of donning the mantle of Malayan citizenship unless I am forced to. It is below my dignity to do so," said Heah Joo Seang, president of the Penang Straits Chinese British Association (SCBA) in 1948. In response to accusations of disloyalty, Penang SCBA member Koh Sin Hock retorted, "I can claim to be more anak Pulau Pinang (a son of Penang) than 99 per cent of the Malays living here today."

== Emergence of secessionism ==
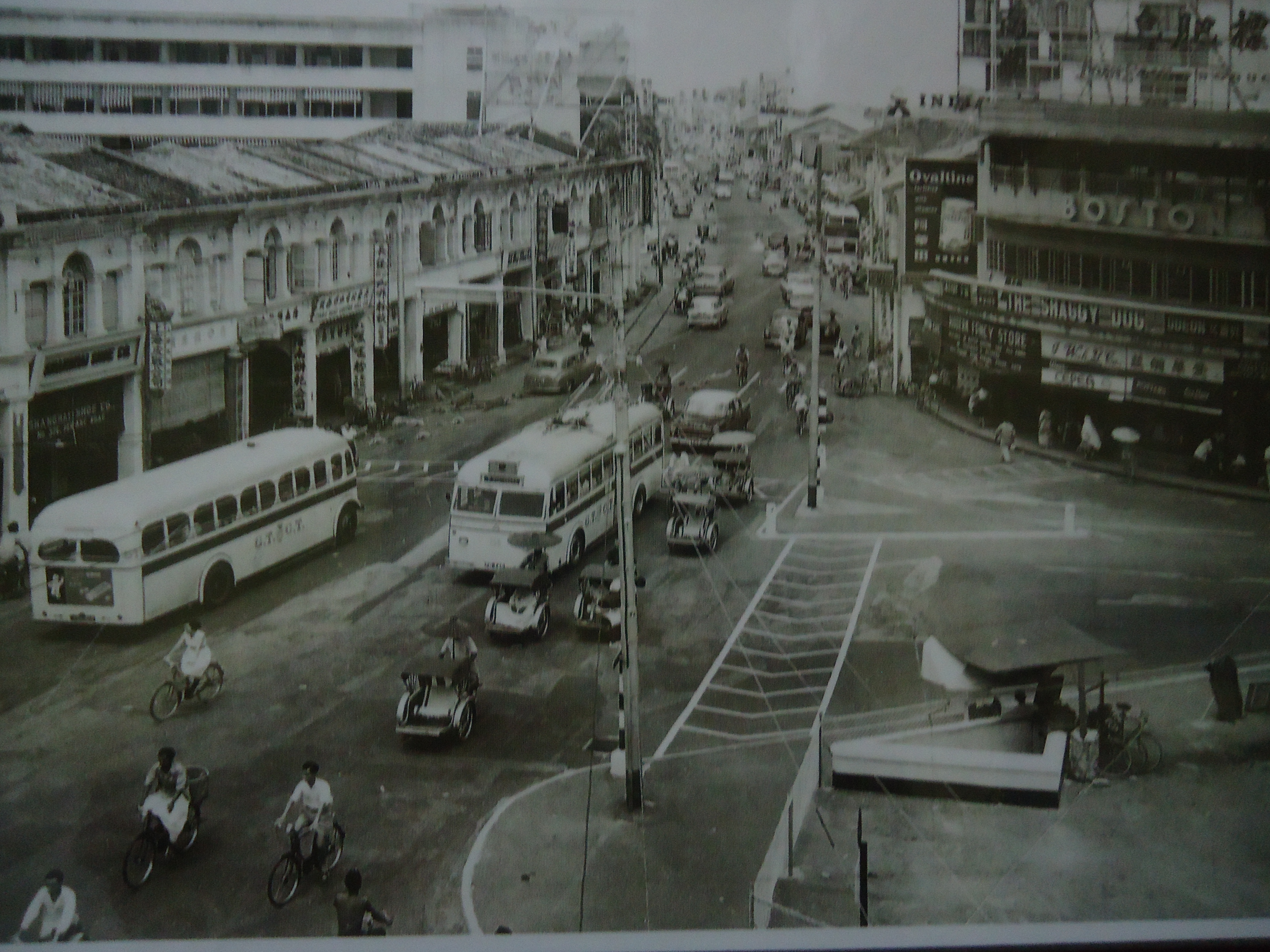
George Town in 1950. As a free port, the city had mainly depended on maritime trade in the years prior to Malaya's independence.

In December 1946, the Penang Constitutional Consultative Committee was formed by Chinese business elites, namely from the Penang Chinese Chamber of Commerce (PCCC), Chinese Town Hall and the Penang SCBA. The committee sent a petition in March 1947 to the Secretary of State for the Colonies Arthur Creech Jones, arguing that it would be against the United Nations' Declaration on Non Self-governing Territories to merge Penang with Malaya without the consent of Penang's residents.

In late 1948, D.A. Mackay was elected chairman of the Penang Chamber of Commerce, a European-led business grouping. Mackay firmly believed that Penang's interests would be better served outside of the new federation. He sent feelers to the Penang SCBA for a potential joint action against Penang’s merger into the federation.

At around the same time, Singapore SCBA president Ong T. W. announced in writing to the Penang SCBA that he would internally propose the restoration of the Straits Settlements. The Penang SCBA received the two feelers within days of each other, but unlike Ong's letter, Mackay's made headlines in the Straits Echo.

Penang SCBA president Lim Huck Aik immediately voiced his support for the secession, as were presidents N. T. Assomull of the Penang Indian Chamber of Commerce and J. P. Souter of the Settlement of Penang Association. Within days, the Straits Echo, as well as the PCCC, the Penang Eurasian Association and the Penang Muslim Chamber of Commerce, formally announced their backing of the secessionist movement.

By mid-December, leaders of the business groupings formed an interim secessionist committee, which included members of the Settlement and Federal legislatures such as Mrs B.H. Oon, Lim Khye Seng, Dr Lee Tiang Keng, Ng Sui Cam, and Chee Swee Ee. The committee resolved that "the Settlement of Penang do adopt all constitutional means for obtaining the secession of the Settlement of Penang from the Federation of Malaya and that the reversion to the Straits Settlements would be to the best interests of Penang and Province Wellesley". Secessionists differed on the outcome, with proposals ranging from re-establishing the Straits Settlements with Malacca and Singapore, to declaring independence for Penang alone, or limiting secession to Penang Island while returning Province Wellesley to Kedah as a compromise. The movement gained national prominence after making the front page of Singapore-based The Straits Times, then a leading daily in Malaya.

=== Opposition to secessionism ===
By the end of 1948, race relations had deteriorated as a result of the Malayan Emergency. The secessionist committee took pains to insist that the movement was not racially motivated. Despite this, secessionism drew opposition from Malay Muslims, driven primarily by the United Malays National Organisation (UMNO) out of fears that Malay interests in Penang would be subsumed in a predominantly Chinese state. Malay-language daily Utusan Melayu called for the return of Penang to Kedah, the state from which Penang was originally carved out by the British East India Company, while UMNO founder Onn Jaafar proclaimed during an anti-secessionist demonstration that "if the Malays do not agree to it, there can be no secession".

The secessionists largely disregarded the Malay Muslim opposition and instead focused on negotiations with British administrators, who feared that an independent Penang might jeopardise Malay support and lead to the partitioning of the federation. The British, preoccupied with combating the communists, considered the secessionist movement a hindrance to efforts to improve racial harmony.

Certain factions within the non-Malay community also opposed Penang's secession. Tan Cheng Lock, future leader of the Malaysian Chinese Association (MCA), voiced concerns that Penang's secession would "shut the door to Singapore's future entry" and weaken Chinese political power in the new federation. While initially in support of secession, president A. M. Abu Bakar of the Penang Muslim Chamber of Commerce distanced himself from the movement, attributing his support to economic reasons and influence from the Indian Muslim members in his organisation.

=== Attempts towards secession ===
The secessionists believed that attempts to engage Malay Muslims would be unsuccessful, so they sought support from the British instead. However, early attempts at persuading the British authorities in Kuala Lumpur proved futile. The secessionists then tried introducing motions for secession in the Penang Settlement Council and the Federal Legislative Council, but these efforts also failed. They eventually turned to direct appeals to London.

The secessionists showed little interest on the mass-based politics that was taking shape in Malaya, thus failing to capitalise on public dissatisfaction within Penang against the colonial authorities. While Singapore SCBA president Ong had proposed a prebescite as an “opening gambit”, the secessionist committee did not pursue this suggestion. Instead, they met high commissioner Henry Gurney during his first official visit to Penang and another meeting was held with the British Commissioner-General for Southeast Asia Malcolm MacDonald in January 1949. MacDonald opposed the secession, but promised to remedy "some" of Penang's grievances.

Later that month, the secessionist committee rejected further discussions, opting instead to move a motion demanding Penang's secession in the Settlement and Federal legislatures. The motion was proposed in the Settlement Council in February, where it was eventually defeated by a vote of 10 in favour and 15 against. During the debate on the motion, Resident Commissioner (predecessor to the present-day Governor position) Arthur Vincent Aston said that secession was a "proposition which the federation government cannot accept." Despite this, the secessionists claimed "moral victory", while The Straits Times reported that "had a free vote been allowed, the motion would have been carried by a convincing majority."

The overt rejection of Penang's secession by the federal government meant that moving a motion through the federal legislature would be moot. This forced the secessionists to appeal directly to London, sidestepping the federal government. In a sign of declining fervour, the petition to London took five months of drafting. In July, the petition was submitted to Gurney, who sent it back for redrafting with suggestions for clarification. It was only in November when the petition was finally sent to London. When Secretary of State for the Colonies Jim Griffiths asserted in September 1951 that Penang's fate was "indissolubly linked with the mainland of Malaya", the secessionist movement reached a dead end.

=== Revival and failure of secessionism ===
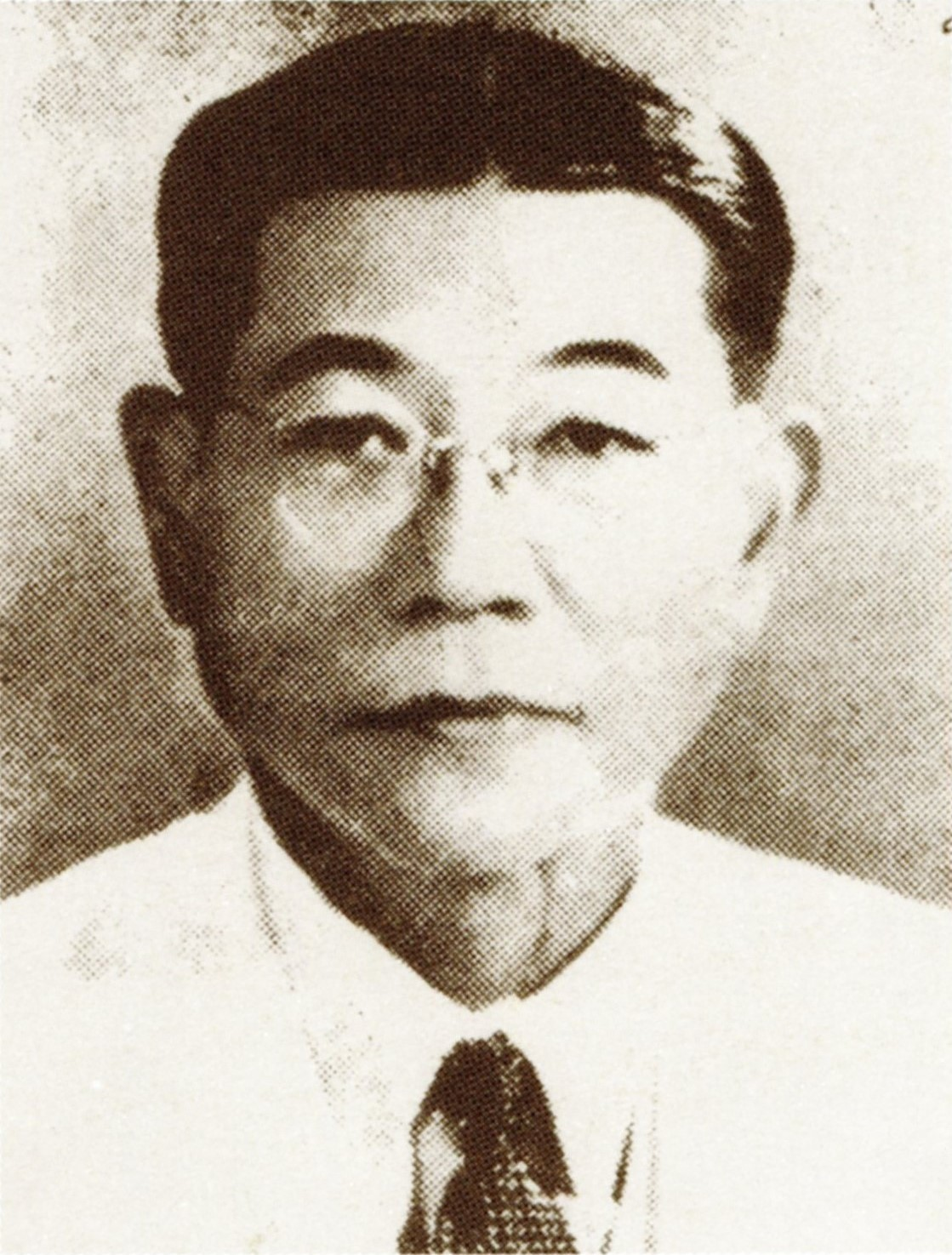
Penang-born businessman Heah Joo Seang played an active role in pushing for Penang's secession from Malaya.

By early 1949, racial tensions had worsened to the point where a shift in approach to win over the non-Malays was required, rather than driving them towards the communist camp. This period saw the emergence of Malay moderation, as well as the abandonment of attempts to extend banishment and double jeopardy powers to Penang by British administrators. To address the grievances of secessionists, the British promised greater decentralisation and guaranteed George Town’s free port status. By 1951, municipal elections for George Town were reintroduced. Additionally, the establishment of MCA in 1949 provided an alternative for Chinese political participation in the new federation.

The commitment of the secessionists waned by the end of 1949; however, in 1953 the UMNO–MCA alliance announced their intent to push for the merger of Singapore into the federation. Singapore SCBA president Ong was against the merger, stating indignantly that Penang and Malacca should try to secede. Ong unexpectedly found support from Sultan Ibrahim of Johor. In his letter to The Straits Times, the Sultan stated, "I say Singapore, Penang and Malacca should be Straits Settlements for ever... why did they make a federation of all Malaya? Why did they put in Penang and Malacca?"

As political discourse had shifted towards Malaya's imminent independence, the secessionists felt it prudent to raise concerns on Penang's future. In response to the renewed secessionist sentiment, Heah said, "although the Colonial Office has invariably said "no" to the two Settlements' representation for secession, I feel we should try again and break away from the Federation." However, no substantial action was taken in the subsequent years, while secessionist sentiments fluctuated alongside Malay calls for the return of Penang to Kedah.

In February 1956, the Penang SCBA declared that "the best solution would be for all the nine states and two settlements to enjoy political autonomy and form a United States of Malaya. Failing this, we have no alternative but to agitate for a dominion status for Penang, Malacca and Singapore… In other words, we will revert to our former status (as Straits Settlements)". Heah added that Penang SCBA was planning to send a five-man delegation to London. Chief Minister of Malaya Tunku Abdul Rahman responded by reassuring Penang that it should not fear the imposition of anyone's will upon it.

In April that year, Tunku Abdul Rahman made his first working visit to Penang and emphasised the "absolute necessity" of Penang's merger into the federation, stating that "independence would be meaningless if this settlement were left out." Koh, a fervent supporter of secession, responded by proposing Penang as a separate state politically associated with the United Kingdom. Onn Jaafar suggested a referendum for Penang with limited choices of either merging into Kedah or being a "separate State of the Union". A commentator argued that "agitation for Penang's secession can only result in the stiffening of Malay demands for union with Kedah".

As late as January 1957, the secessionists were demanding "a loose federation between Singapore, Penang and Malacca (i.e. the former Straits Settlements) under their own autonomous government." By this point, the commitment to secession had substantially diminished. Heah not only led the Penang SCBA, but also concurrently served as the vice president of Parti Negara, a national-level political party. The conflicting responsibilities eventually led to a shift in direction for the Penang SCBA. As Malaya's independence approached, secessionist sentiments gradually faded.

== Aftermath ==
=== Lee Kuan Yew's confederation proposal ===
In the months leading to Singapore's expulsion from Malaysia on 9 August 1965, Singapore's Prime Minister Lee Kuan Yew had advocated for "alternative arrangements" to be implemented within Malaysia, in response to escalating racial tensions at the time. Lee, in promulgating a "Malaysian Malaysia" vision where all races were treated as equals, had been instrumental in forming the Malaysian Solidarity Convention, which included opposition parties from Penang such as the United Democratic Party (UDP).

In a speech to the Malaysian Parliament on 27 May 1965, Lee said, "they want us to secede and leave our friends from Sabah and Sarawak, from Penang and Malacca… at their tender mercies. We cannot oblige, Mr Speaker, sir." Upon returning from an overseas trip in late May, Lee was reported to have suggested that "alternative arrangements" should be made "now instead of waiting for another five or 10 years. He added later that one possible arrangement would be to consolidate "Singapore, Sabah, Sarawak, and possibly Malacca and Penang as well.""

The Straits Times' headline stated that Lee was now suggesting the partitioning of Malaysia. At a subsequent press conference, Lee denied the allegations of proposing partition, saying that "I am the last man to suggest partition of Malaysia. The Tunku knows that the only alternative arrangement I envisage is within Malaysia, that accommodation and adjustment can be made within Malaysia." Nonetheless, the then Chief Minister of Penang Wong Pow Nee of the MCA, along with the ruling parties in Sabah, Sarawak and Malacca, distanced themselves from Lee's proposal. Worsening tensions and threats of more violence by some quarters within the ruling UMNO eventually resulted in Singapore's expulsion from the federation.

=== Turbulent Penang–federal relations ===
Following Malaysia's independence in 1957, Penang, the most economically-dynamic state in the new federation with the only non-Malay majority population, was said to be on par with Singapore and Hong Kong. However in 1969, the Malaysian federal government revoked George Town's free port status, sparking the city's decline and widespread unemployment within the state. This became a significant issue in the 1969 state election, which resulted in the opposition Gerakan (a splinter party of the UDP) taking control of the Penang state government from the ruling Alliance that included UMNO and MCA.

The 1969 race riots in Kuala Lumpur prompted the Alliance-controlled federal government, led by Abdul Razak Hussein, to introduce the New Economic Policy (NEP), focusing on affirmative action-based economic development that favoured ethnic Malays. The NEP and Malaysia's centralised power structure made Penang susceptible to federal-state conflicts, as Penang began undertaking significant economic restructuring that would align it more closely with the global economy. In spite of this, newly-elected Chief Minister Lim Chong Eu was able to secure some degree of autonomy by maintaining ties with Abdul Razak. In 1973, Gerakan joined the ruling Alliance to ensure Penang's inclusion in national development policies.

In 2008, Penang once again became an opposition-controlled state when Pakatan Rakyat (now Pakatan Harapan) won the state election that year. Since coming under the administration of the opposition, Penang has periodically faced disputes with the federal government over matters such as governance, funding and other related issues. Partisanship worsened under Najib Razak's administration, when the federal government slashed federal funds for Penang and bypassed the state government in development policies. This situation continued until the 2018 elections, when Pakatan Harapan formed the federal government for the first time in Malaysia's history. However, after failing to secure a majority of seats in the 2022 elections, PH ultimately entered into a coalition government with UMNO.

== See also ==
- Sabah Sarawak Keluar Malaysia
