= Sabah Sarawak Keluar Malaysia =

Separatist movement in Malaysia

Sabah Sarawak Keluar Malaysia (SSKM; English: Sabah and Sarawak Leave Malaysia) is a separatist organisation that intends to separate the states of Sabah and Sarawak from the Federation of Malaysia.

On 24 October 2026, on United Nations Day, the SSKM branch in Australia, staged a protest outside of the Parliament of Victoria in Melbourne, calling for the independence of Sabah and Sarawak.

== See also ==
- Separatist movements of Malaysia
- Separation of Singapore from Malaysia
- Proposed 2019 amendment to the Constitution of Malaysia
- North Borneo dispute
- Penang secession movement
