= Western Armenia Government in Exile =

Self-proclaimed government-in-exile

Republic of Western Armenia State of Armenia Արևմտյան Հայաստանի Հանրապետություն (Armenian) Arevmtyan Hayastani Hanrapetut’yun Արեւմտեան Հայաստանի Հանրապետութիւն (Western Armenian) Arevmdyan Hayasdani Hanrabedutʿyun Հայաստան պետության (Armenian) Hayasdan bedutʿyan
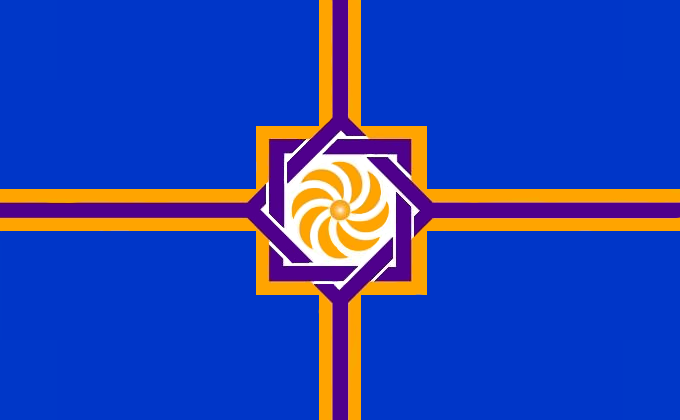
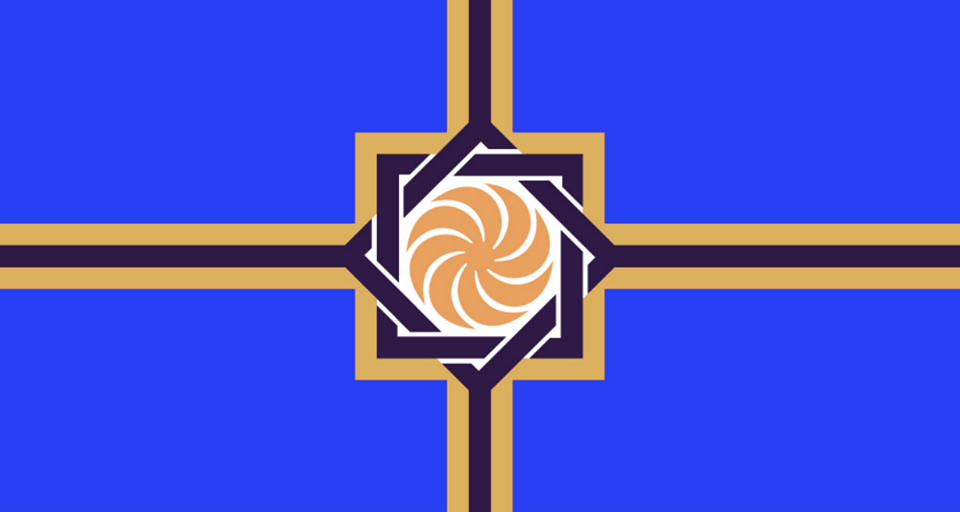
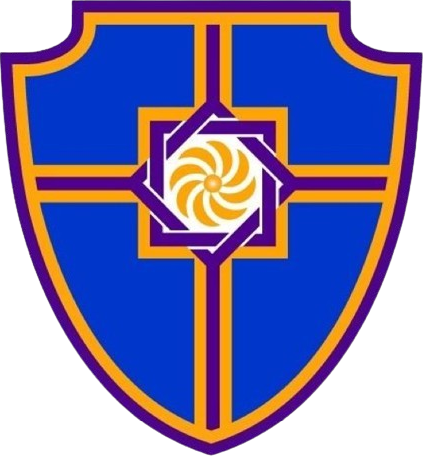
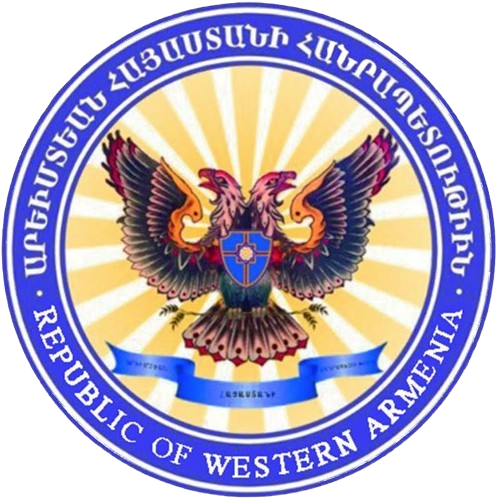
- (Note: The first one is in the decree of the flag, while the second one is the variant of which is commonly used. Another variant being used uses #0000E7 for the blue, seen in places like in places like Western Armenia TV and the President's website. Both versions are used, however the one using the #0000E7 doesn't seem to be used that much.) Flag (Note: The first one is in the decree of the flag, while the second one is the variant that is used sometimes by Western Armenia, although definitely not as much.) Coat of arms
- Anthem: Zartir Lao; Զարթի՛ր, լաօ (English: "Awake, my son")
- Capital: Karin (Erzurum)
- Capital-in-exile: Paris

Government
  - President: Lydia Margossian; Radik Khamoyan; Martik Gasparyan
  - Prime Minister: Seda Melikyan; Tigran Pashabezyan
  - President of the National Assembly: Nelly Harutyunyan; Armen Ter-Sarkisyan
- Legislature: National Assembly

Establishment
  - Kingdom of Urartu: 860 BC–590 BC
  - Kingdom of Armenia (antiquity): 321 BC–428 AD
  - Kingdom of Armenia (medieval): 880s–1045
  - Armenian Kingdom of Cilicia: 1080–1375
  - Six Armenian vilayets: 1878
  - Armenian genocide: 1915–1917
  - Occupation of Western Armenia: 1915–1918
  - First Republic of Armenia: 1918
  - Treaty of Sèvres: 1920
  - Turkish–Armenian war: 1920
  - Beginning of the establishment process: 2011
- Website parliament-wa.info

The Republic of Western Armenia, also known as the State of Armenia, is a government-in-exile claiming sovereignty over parts of the Armenian highlands including sections of Western Armenia as well as Nakhichevan, (Note: http://www.western-armenia.eu/stat.gov.wa/en/2013/DECLARATION-THE-NATIONAL-ASSEMBLY-OF-WESTERN-ARMENIA-01.06.2013.pdf The declaration's original text lists the following claimed territory: 1. Van; 2. Bitlis; 3. Erzrum (Garin); 4. Trapizon (Hamshen); 5. Sivas (Sebastia); 6. Diarbeqir (Dikranagert); 7. Kharput (Kharberd); 8. Kilikia (including Cesaria, Marash, Adana, Zeytun, Aynput, Antioq); 9. Kars (and Surmalu); 10. Javakhq; 11. Nakhijevan) and sometimes also Nagorno-Karabakh. The self-declared country says it has its own presidency, government, parliament, constitution, national anthem, and coat of arms.

The individuals of the Republic of Western Armenia claim to be the legal successor of the Armenian state recognised by international law in 1920, and therefore internationally recognised.

== Background ==
The presence of Armenians in Anatolia has been documented since the sixth century BCE, about 1,500 years before the arrival of Turkmens under the Seljuk dynasty.

In the 16th and 17th centuries, historical Armenia was divided between the Ottomans taking the West and the Safavids taking the East.

On the eve of World War I in 1914, around two million Armenians lived in Anatolia out of a total population of 15–17.5 million. According to the Armenian Patriarchate's estimates for 1913–1914, there were 2,925 Armenian towns and villages in the Ottoman Empire, of which 2,084 were in the Armenian highlands in the vilayets of Bitlis, Diyarbekir, Erzerum, Harput, and Van. Armenians were a minority in most places where they lived, alongside Turkish and Kurdish Muslim and Greek Orthodox Christian neighbors. According to the Patriarchate's figure, 215,131 Armenians lived in urban areas, especially Constantinople, Smyrna, and Eastern Thrace. Although most Ottoman Armenians were peasant farmers, they were overrepresented in commerce. As minorities, despite the wealth of some Armenians, their overall political power was low, making them especially vulnerable. The ethnic cleansing of Armenians during the final years of the Ottoman Empire is widely considered a genocide, The Ottoman Empire massacred approximately 600,000–1,500,000 Armenians. The first wave of persecution was in the years 1894 to 1896, the second one culminating in the events of the Armenian genocide in 1915 and 1916.

== History ==
On 17 December 2004, the "Declaration of the right of self-determination of the Armenians from Western Armenia" was signed in Shushi; which by extension also established the National Council of Armenians from Western Armenia.

On 4 February 2011, the establishment of the government-in-exile of Western Armenia was announced, and on 21 October 2011, the constitution, flag, coat of arms and anthem were all adopted. In November 2013, the National Assembly of Western Armenia was formed; whose deputies at the first session of Parliament in Paris, on 20 January 2014, elected the President of Western Armenia.

== Claimed lands ==
The Declaration of the Formation of the National Assembly of Western Armenia states that Western Armenia's jurisdiction applies to the vilayets of Van, Bitlis, Erzurum (which Armenians call "Karin"), Trebizond, Sivas, Diyarbekir, Harput, Kars, Surmalu, Javakheti, and Nakhchivan, as well as the historical region of Cilicia.

Artsakh is also sometimes claimed to be part of the Republic of Western Armenia.

Karin is claimed as the capital of Western Armenia.

The "Western Armenia TV" newscaster also introduced cities such as Bitlis, Muş, Van, Mardin, Iğdır, Adana, Trabzon and Rize as "Western Armenia" in their news bulletins. The broadcaster stated, "Western Armenia, which was declared an independent and sovereign state in 1920, is now occupied by Turkey. Sooner or later it will return to its true owners, the Armenians."

== See also ==
- History of Armenia
- List of active separatist movements
- United Armenia

== Sources ==
- Suny, Ronald Grigor (2015). They Can Live in the Desert but Nowhere Else: A History of the Armenian Genocide. Princeton University Press. ISBN 978-1-4008-6558-1.
- Kévorkian, Raymond (2011). The Armenian Genocide: A Complete History. I.B. Tauris. ISBN 978-0-85771-930-0.
- Bloxham, Donald (2005). The Great Game of Genocide: Imperialism, Nationalism, and the Destruction of the Ottoman Armenians. Oxford University Press. ISBN 978-0-19-927356-0.
- Ahmed, Ali (2006). "Turkey". Encyclopedia of the Developing World. Routledge. ISBN 978-1-57958-388-0.
