= Assyria Council of Europe =

Lobbying organization based in Brussels

Assyria Council of Europe is a lobbying organization based in Brussels, that lobbies the European Union and other European countries on behalf of the Assyrian people worldwide.
