= Assyrian General Conference =

The logo of AGC

The Assyrian General Conference (AGC) (Syriac: ܠܘܡܕܐ ܐܫܘܪܝܐ ܓܘܢܝܐ) is a political organization representing Assyrians of today in Iraq. It was established on August 7, 2005 in Baghdad, Iraq.

== Mission statement ==
To establish an Assyria region in our historical places where Assyrians can live in peace.

== Goals ==
- To preserve the national unity of Iraq to include Assyrians as a part of the Iraqi land and people.
- Work on building a state of law and the separation of the three powers (legislative, executive and judiciary), the promotion of the principles of brotherhood and equality among all religions and nationalities in Iraq, and the rebuilding of civil society and supporting institutions.
- Work to consolidate national unity for the Assyrian people and thus promote the national identity, Assyria, and to be included in the Iraqi constitution.
- To end the injustice and inequity that was inflicted upon the Assyrian people since the founding of the State of Iraq in 1921 up to this day through cooperation and understanding with the official and concerned bodies.
- To strive to ensure the legitimate rights of the Assyrian people, including the right of self-governance within a united Iraq.
- Work to restore the Assyrian villages and all the lands that have been seized after the founding of the State of Iraq to the rightful owners, in order for the Assyrian people to exercise their rights and preserve their national identity in the areas of their historical presence.
- Work to allow immigrants and forcibly displaced Assyrians to return to their areas of origin and to ensure all their rights to property, lands, and usurped historic villages.
- To initiate a renaissance in recognizing the proud history of Assyrian civilization as the cornerstone of Iraq and world civilization.
- Work to strengthen the national institutions and political parties in their right to work, at the national political level and the adoption of the quota system in the election of our representatives.
- To give grants and material support to the authors, researchers and translators to commemorate our history and our civilization, according to the available resources.
- Work to remove all obstacles and prejudicial practices exercised against our people in the form of unfair policies, laws, and regulations, in manning sensitive positions, which should be filled by merit of efficiency, and competence and without discrimination of race, religion or sex.
- Work on the grounds that all Assyrians in the world are Iraqis and they have the legitimate right to possess Iraqi nationality, as Iraq is their homeland.
- Work on the development of the Conference, which can represent the Assyrian people inside the country and in international forums.
- Support all our institutions, cultural, scientific, social and economic, to enable them to cope with the wheel of progress and development at home and abroad.
- Supporting education in the mother tongue by adopting the most effective methods and developing the educational welfare of students.
- Respect for the Universal Declaration of Human Rights and to work on International and United Nations laws concerning the rights of ethnic minorities and the protection of their national and religious groups and to ensure the rights of women.
