= Manipur government in exile =

Self-styled de jure Government of Manipur

De jure Government of Manipur ꯃꯅꯤꯄꯨꯔ ꯃꯅꯤꯡ ꯇꯝꯕ ꯂꯩꯉꯥꯛ
- Constitutional Monarchy

Executive branch
- Chief Minister: Yambem Biren
- Main body: Manipur State Council
- Minister of External Affairs and Defence: Narengbam Samarjit

Manipur government in exile was a self-claimed governing body of the de jure government of Manipur under Manipur State Constitution Act 1947. On 29 October 2019, two dissident leaders addressed a press conference in London and announced the "declaration of independence of Manpur" and stated that they will reach out to the United Nations for recognition. They said a de jure government was formed on 14 March 2012. Representatives for the State of Manipur's King Leishemba Sanajaoba announced in a press release that they "believe that now is the right time to [form] the Independent Government of Manipur before the international community to announce our independent status and to seek recognition." They also called on members of the United Nations to recognize them as an exile government. They further claim that "the sovereign State of Manipur was excluded from India by the Order in Council by his Majesty on 27 December 1946" and accused the Indian Government of annexing Manipur State in violation of the Act 1949. They said they will present a resolution to Her Majesty Queen Elizabeth II. The Government of Manipur filed a case against the separatist leaders for waging war on the state. Titular Maharaja of Manipur distanced himself from the dissident leaders.

== Arrest of leaders ==
On 29 March 2021, Self-styled Minister of Defense Narengbam Samarjit was arrested at Indira Gandhi International Airport in Delhi while coming back to India via an Air India flight which landed in Delhi on Wednesday.

NIA had filed a chargesheet against the five accused persons, including Samarjit and Yambem Biren, at the NIA Special Court, Manipur. They were charged under Sections 120B and 420 of the Indian Penal Code and Sections 13 and 17 of the Unlawful Activities (Prevention) Act, 1967.

On 1 April 2021, a Special NIA court sent Narengbam Samarjit to police custody for 13 days.
