= Zale'n-gam =

Proposed state for the Kuki people

Zale'n-gam or Zalengam (Thadou-Kuki) dialect for 'land of freedom'), is a proposed state by Kuki people, with the intention of uniting all the Kuki tribes under a single government. The proposed state's main proponents are the Kuki National Organisation and its armed wing, the Kuki National Army.

== See also ==
- Kuki Inpi
