= Kuki National Army =

Militant organisation active in northeast India and Myanmar

- Flag of the Kuki People, used by the Kuki National Army
- Leaders: P. S. Haokip (president and supreme commander); Seilen Haokip (KNO spokesperson)
- Dates active: 24 February 1988 – present
- Headquarters: Mobile
- Active regions: Manipur, India; Sagaing Region and Chin State, Myanmar
- Ideology: Self-determination
- Size: c. 200 cadres in Myanmar (KNA-B)
- Part of: Kuki National Organisation
- Wars: Myanmar civil war (Burmese faction only)

The Kuki National Army (KNA) is a Kuki-Zo militant group active in pockets of Northeast India and in Upper Myanmar. It is the principal armed wing of the Kuki National Organisation (KNO), the umbrella body that brings together a number of Kuki-Zo militant outfits in Manipur and the Sagaing Region of Myanmar.

The KNA was founded on 24 February 1988 by P. S. Haokip, who continues to lead it as president and supreme commander. Its stated objective is the creation of a Kuki homeland called Zale'n-gam, encompassing Kuki-inhabited tracts in Manipur and parts of Myanmar's Sagaing Region and Chin State. After the 2010 Burmese general election, pressure from other Kuki organisations led to the formal separation of the group's Indian and Burmese wings, and the latter is now generally referred to as the Kuki National Army-Burma, or KNA-B.

The KNA has been a signatory to the tripartite Suspension of Operations (SoO) agreement with the Government of India and the Government of Manipur since 22 August 2008. Its terms confine cadres to designated camps in the Manipur hills and place their weapons in monitored armouries. The cabinet headed by then chief minister N. Biren Singh moved on 10 March 2023 to pull the state out of the agreement with the KNA and the Zomi Revolutionary Army, citing alleged involvement in poppy cultivation and the sheltering of undocumented migrants from Myanmar; the Manipur Assembly endorsed full abrogation in February 2024, although the Centre declined to follow suit.

In Myanmar, the KNA-B resumed armed operations against the Tatmadaw after the 2021 Myanmar coup d'état and has fought alongside the Kachin Independence Army and units of the People's Defence Force (PDF). From 2024, it has also clashed repeatedly with the National Socialist Council of Nagaland (Isak-Muivah) (NSCN-IM) inside the Sagaing Region, and from January 2025 with Manipur valley insurgent groups operating from Myanmar territory. In India, KNA cadres have been accused of attacks on security forces during the 2023–2026 Manipur conflict, including a series of raids on the Border Security Force and Manipur Police in the border town of Moreh in late 2023 and early 2024. The National Investigation Agency has since arrested several KNA cadres in connection with these incidents.

== History ==
=== Founding and early years ===
The Kuki National Army was founded on 24 February 1988 alongside the Kuki National Organisation, with the goal of establishing a Kuki state administered by the Kuki people across India and Myanmar. The founding came in the wake of the 1986 Mizo Accord, which had ended the Greater Mizoram movement in which sections of the Kuki population had taken part, and at a moment when the rise of the National Socialist Council of Nagaland and its blueprint for a "Greater Nagalim" was placing renewed pressure on Kuki villages in the northern hills of Manipur.

The KNA was, in this period, only one of several Kuki-Zo armed groups to emerge in the late 1980s and early 1990s. The Kuki National Front, founded on 18 May the same year, made Kangpokpi its base, while the KNA sought to operate across all Kuki-inhabited regions, except in Nagaland, where it deferred to other Kuki bodies.

The group's early operations centred on northern Manipur and the Indo-Burmese border belt, where its cadres clashed repeatedly with NSCN forces during the Kuki-Naga clashes of 1992 to 1997. Figures published in Economic and Political Weekly put the combined death toll on both sides at upwards of 2,000, with tens of thousands displaced. The Kuki side, drawing on data compiled by Kuki Inpi Manipur, has placed the toll higher, claiming that NSCN (Isak-Muivah) cadres uprooted more than 350 Kuki villages and killed roughly 1,000 unarmed people during the period. The Joupi massacre of 13 September 1993, in which around 115 Kuki villagers were killed in Tamenglong and the erstwhile Senapati district, is commemorated each year by the KNO and Kuki civil society as Sahnit-Ni, or Black Day.

The first chief of army staff of the KNA, Brigadier Vipin Haokip, was killed in January 2005 in Churachandpur district in an internecine clash with cadres of the United Kuki Liberation Front and the Kuki Revolutionary Army; he was succeeded by Colonel S. Robert Haokip.

=== Separation of the Indian and Burmese wings (2010) ===
After the 2010 Burmese general election, pressure from other Kuki organisations led the KNA to formally separate its Indian and Burmese wings. The Burmese component was renamed the Kuki National Army-Burma, or KNA-B. The KNA-B retained operational autonomy inside Myanmar, while the Indian wing remained inside the SoO framework.

== Suspension of Operations agreement ==
A tripartite SoO that brought in the Manipur government followed on 22 August 2008, covering 25 Kuki-Zo militant groups across the KNO and the United People's Front, and has been renewed annually since. Around 2,200 cadres drawn from KNO and UPF affiliates are housed in fourteen designated camps in the Manipur hills under the terms of the pact.

The terms of the SoO confine cadres to those camps, place their weapons in monitored "double-locked" armouries, ban fresh recruitment and the operation of front organisations, and prohibit armed parades or the hoisting of flags.

The pact has drawn opposition from Meitei civil society from the start. The Coordinating Committee on Manipur Integrity, the dominant Meitei civil society umbrella, has on multiple occasions described it as a "deceptive pact" that legitimises what its members call "Chin-Kuki narco-terrorists", and has pressed for outright abrogation.

On 10 March 2023, the cabinet headed by N. Biren Singh announced its intention to pull the state out of the SoO with the KNA and the Zomi Revolutionary Army, citing alleged involvement in poppy cultivation and the sheltering of undocumented migrants from Myanmar. The Manipur Assembly went further on 29 February 2024, passing a resolution that called for full abrogation, although the Centre declined to endorse the move.

Talks resumed in New Delhi in June 2025 between the Ministry of Home Affairs, the KNO and the United People's Front, with the agenda focused on consolidating and relocating SoO camps away from Meitei-inhabited areas, surrendering weapons, and reopening national highways disrupted by the conflict.

== Activities in Myanmar ==
=== Pre-2021 engagements ===
By the count of the Indian Council of World Affairs, the KNA participated in roughly twenty armed engagements with the Myanmar Armed Forces between 1991 and 2013. Its area of operations in Myanmar centres on Kuki-inhabited tracts of the Sagaing Region and northern Chin State, including Tamu Township, Hkamti Township, Homalin Township, Leshi Township and Ton Zang Township. The KNA-B's cadre strength has been estimated at around 200 fighters.

=== Resumption of armed operations after the 2021 coup ===
After the 2021 Myanmar coup d'état toppled the elected National League for Democracy government, the KNA-B aligned itself with the anti-junta resistance. On 10 April 2021, the group claimed an attack on Tatmadaw positions that left 18 soldiers dead.

In October 2023, KNA-B fighters joined a Kachin Independence Army offensive in the Sagaing Region that captured the Tatmadaw's Aungja base. In December the same year, KNA cadres took part in the seizure of a junta post in Tamu Township alongside local People's Defence Force units.

The KNA-B retains a presence at the Kamjong-Myanmar border check post and continues to operate in concert with the KIA and the PDF in the Tamu sector.

=== Conflict with NSCN-IM ===
The KNA-B has clashed repeatedly with the National Socialist Council of Nagaland (Isak-Muivah) in the border belt running through Tengnoupal district and across the line into the Sagaing Region. On 10 February 2024, an NSCN-IM cadre named Honpam Chithung was killed by the KNA-B at the border town of Ongjia, prompting the Naga group to issue a statement accusing the KNA-B and the Kuki villages of Mawailuk, Aishi and Phaikoh of "senseless warmongering". R. S. Winson, an NSCN-IM "captain", was ambushed and killed in the Angko Ching range on 15 June 2024; the Naga group's leadership openly attributed the killing to KNA-B fighters.

NSCN-IM has, in turn, accused Indian security forces of providing logistical and material support to the KNA-B in operations against rival Naga and Meitei armed groups inside Myanmar, an allegation the Indian government has not formally addressed in any published response.

=== Conflict with Manipur valley insurgent groups ===
From January 2025, the KNA-B has been engaged in extended fighting with Meitei valley-based insurgent groups operating from Myanmar territory. Reporting in the Imphal Review of Arts and Politics described five days of "relentless attacks" by the KNA-B on Manipur-based outfits inside Myanmar between 27 and 31 January 2025, in which more than 30 KNA-B cadres and at least three valley insurgents were reportedly killed in the Yaingoupk-Wangli sector along Border Pillar 87, in the Kamjong District. The opposing combatants included cadres of the People's Liberation Army of Manipur, PREPAK, the Kangleipak Communist Party, the Kanglei Yawol Kanna Lup and the Koireng-led faction of the United National Liberation Front.

The South Asia Terrorism Portal recorded a separate gunfight on 14 May 2025, in which at least ten suspected KNA-B militants were killed in an operation by the Assam Rifles in New Samtal village in Khengjoy tehsil of Chandel district, with seven AK-47 rifles, an RPG launcher, an M4 carbine and four single-barrel breech-loading rifles recovered.

On New Year's Day 2026, the KNA-B launched an assault on positions held by Manipur-based insurgent groups in Teijang village in Myothit sub-division, some twenty-five kilometres north of Tamu and barely a kilometre from the Indo-Myanmar border. According to one report, the engagement reflected a wider pattern in which "valley-based insurgent groups from Manipur are reported to have aligned with Myanmar's military regime in exchange for shelter and logistical support, while Kuki armed groups, including the KNA(B), have been fighting alongside anti-junta forces".

== Activities in India ==
=== Role in the 2023–2026 Manipur conflict ===
The Manipur violence that broke out on 3 May 2023 between Meitei and Kuki-Zo communities killed at least 258 people and displaced more than 60,000 by official figures available to November 2024. Manipur was placed under President's Rule on 13 February 2025 following the resignation of N. Biren Singh.

The Manipur government and Meitei civil bodies have alleged that KNA cadres broke camp confinement to participate in attacks on Meitei villages and to supply weapons and tactical guidance to Kuki "village volunteers". A joint memorandum filed in July 2025 by four Manipur civil bodies, the Indigenous Peoples' Forum Manipur, the Meitei Alliance, the Foothill Naga Coordination Committee and Thadou Inpi Manipur, accused 25 outfits operating under the KNO and the UPF, the KNA among them, of having had a hand in the violence at Churachandpur, including arson at Torbung and Kanvai.

By mid-2025, the Ministry of Home Affairs had publicly acknowledged only two confirmed cases of SoO ground rule violations, although Meitei groups put the figure considerably higher. Pressed on the question, KNO spokesperson Seilen Haokip told The Wire in September 2024 that he could not say with confidence whether the organisation's affiliated cadres, the KNA among them, had breached the agreement.

=== Attacks on security forces in Moreh ===
On 31 October 2023, Sub-Divisional Police Officer Chingtham Anandakumar Singh was shot dead during an ambush at a playground in Moreh, in Manipur's Tengnoupal district; the case was taken over by the National Investigation Agency in March 2024 and assigned to suspected Kuki militants.

On 2 January 2024, around 8 am, a security forces team conducting routine operations in Moreh was attacked with bombs and automatic weapons. The attack injured at least seven personnel, five from the Manipur Police and two from the BSF. A rocket-propelled grenade attack on a security forces position later the same night injured eight more. Then chief minister N. Biren Singh attributed the attacks to "foreign mercenaries from Myanmar, such as the KNA-B and KNA-R", a claim a Tengnoupal-based group called the "Village Volunteers, Tengnoupal District (Eastern Zone)" rejected in a same-day clarification.

A separate ambush on 17 January 2024 killed two police commandos and wounded several others.

=== NIA investigations and arrests ===
The National Investigation Agency took over the investigation into both the SDPO killing and the Moreh attacks in early 2024. On 19 May 2025, NIA officers arrested Thangminlen Mate, identified as a member of the Kuki Inpi Tengnoupal group, in Silchar in Assam, on charges of having orchestrated the 17 January 2024 attack. On 6 June 2025, the agency arrested Kamginthang Gangte, identified as a member of the KNA, and Hentinthang Kipgen, alias Thangneo Kipgen, of the Village Volunteers group, in Imphal. Recovered material in Gangte's possession reportedly included a 9 mm handgun, a magazine and incriminating documents.

The prime accused in the SDPO killing, Otkhothang Baite, alias Othang Baite, a resident of Moreh, was arrested on 30 April 2026.

In a separate case relating to the killing of six Meitei civilians, including a ten-month-old infant, at Jiribam in November 2024, the NIA on 31 July 2025 arrested Thanglienlal Hmar, alias Boya, in Cachar district of Assam, describing him as the prime conspirator. The Jiribam case has not been formally attributed to the KNA.

== Structure and leadership ==
P. S. Haokip, born in 1957, founded the KNA together with the KNO and continues to hold the title of president and supreme commander. Seilen Haokip, the KNO spokesperson, has represented the wider organisation in television interviews during the post-2023 violence, and conceded in a September 2024 exchange with Karan Thapar for The Wire that he could not rule out breaches of the SoO ground rules by groups operating under the KNO banner.

== Allegations of criminal activity ==
=== Narcotics trade ===
The most serious of the criminal allegations against KNA-affiliated cadres concern their involvement in Manipur's opium poppy economy and in the cross-border heroin trade with Myanmar's Golden Triangle. The state's Narcotics and Affairs of Border unit reported that, between 2017 and 2023, security forces destroyed more than 18,664 acres of poppy cultivation in Manipur, of which roughly 85 per cent lay in Kuki-dominated districts.

This framing has been challenged. Reporting in Scroll.in has noted that the drug trade in Manipur cannot be reduced to a single community, since processing units and high-level trafficking networks are not communally homogenous. The independent newsroom Newsreel.asia has argued that the rhetoric of "narco-terrorism" has been used politically against tribal cultivators rather than directed at the wholesalers and traffickers further up the chain. Kuki bodies have themselves criticised N. Biren Singh's "war on drugs" as a cover for evictions of tribal villages from forest land.

=== Recruitment of minors ===
Both Indian state and rights bodies have alleged the recruitment of children as combatants by armed groups in Manipur, the KNA among them. The chairperson of the Manipur Commission for Protection of Child Rights, Keisham Pradeepkumar, told reporters in 2024 that "both Meitei and Kuki armed groups have been inducting children" and that the commission held "multiple cases on record of child soldiers being used". A November 2024 report by CNN-News18 cited unnamed central government sources to allege that Kuki groups were recruiting minors for "key operations" amid the Manipur unrest. The Hindu reported in January 2025 that human rights bodies in Manipur had documented the use of children by armed groups on multiple sides of the conflict. The recruitment of children below the age of fifteen into armed forces, where established, would constitute a violation of Article 77 of the Geneva Conventions of 1949, a point made in commentary published in the local Imphal press.

=== Kidnapping for ransom ===
Reporting on the January 2025 fighting along the Indo-Myanmar border carried a separate allegation against the KNA-B. According to The Wire and the South Asia Terrorism Portal, the NSCN-IM cadre Jamthang Vaiphei, killed at Moreh on 29 January 2025, had been abducted four days earlier from the village of Salampatong, with KNA-B captors demanding a ransom of ₹500,000 from his family for his release before killing him when the sum could not be paid.

=== Cross-border arms and migrant flows ===
The Thadou Inpi Manipur memorandum of September 2025 alleged that KNO networks, the KNA included, were involved in arms smuggling and in the recruitment of youths into cross-border outfits including the KNA-B, claims that echo earlier statements made by the Manipur Chief Minister to the Supreme Court of India. The Free Movement Regime along the Indo-Myanmar border, which had permitted residents within sixteen kilometres of the line to cross without visas, was revoked by the Indian government in February 2024, citing concerns over illegal immigration, arms trafficking and demographic change.

== Relations with other armed groups ==
The KNA-B has fought alongside local People's Defence Force units in the Tamu sector and has at times co-ordinated with Chin resistance organisations in northern Chin State.

The KNA's principal adversaries are the Tatmadaw and its associated Pyusawhti militias in Myanmar; the NSCN-IM and the affiliated Naga Army in the border belt; and, since January 2025, an array of Manipur valley-based insurgent groups operating from Sagaing. Within the Kuki-Zo political space itself, the KNA's role has been challenged most directly since 2024 by Thadou Inpi Manipur, which rejects the "Kuki" label and has called for the dismantling of the SoO framework.
