= Separatism =

Advocacy for separation from a larger group

Separatism is the advocacy of cultural, ethnic, tribal, religious, racial, regional, governmental, or gender separation from the larger group. The goal of separatism is to obtain autonomy from government by protecting the group's social or cultural identity. As with secession, separatism conventionally refers to full political separation. Groups simply seeking greater autonomy are usually not considered separatists. Some discourse settings equate separatism with religious segregation, racial segregation, or sex segregation, while other discourse settings take the broader view that separation by choice may serve useful purposes and is not the same as government-enforced segregation. There is some academic debate about this definition, and in particular how it relates to secessionism.

Separatist groups practice a form of identity politics, or political activity and theorizing founded in the shared experiences of the group's members. Such groups believe attempts at integration with dominant groups compromise their identity and ability to pursue greater self-determination. However, economic and political factors usually are critical in creating strong separatist movements as opposed to less ambitious identity movements.

== Motivations ==
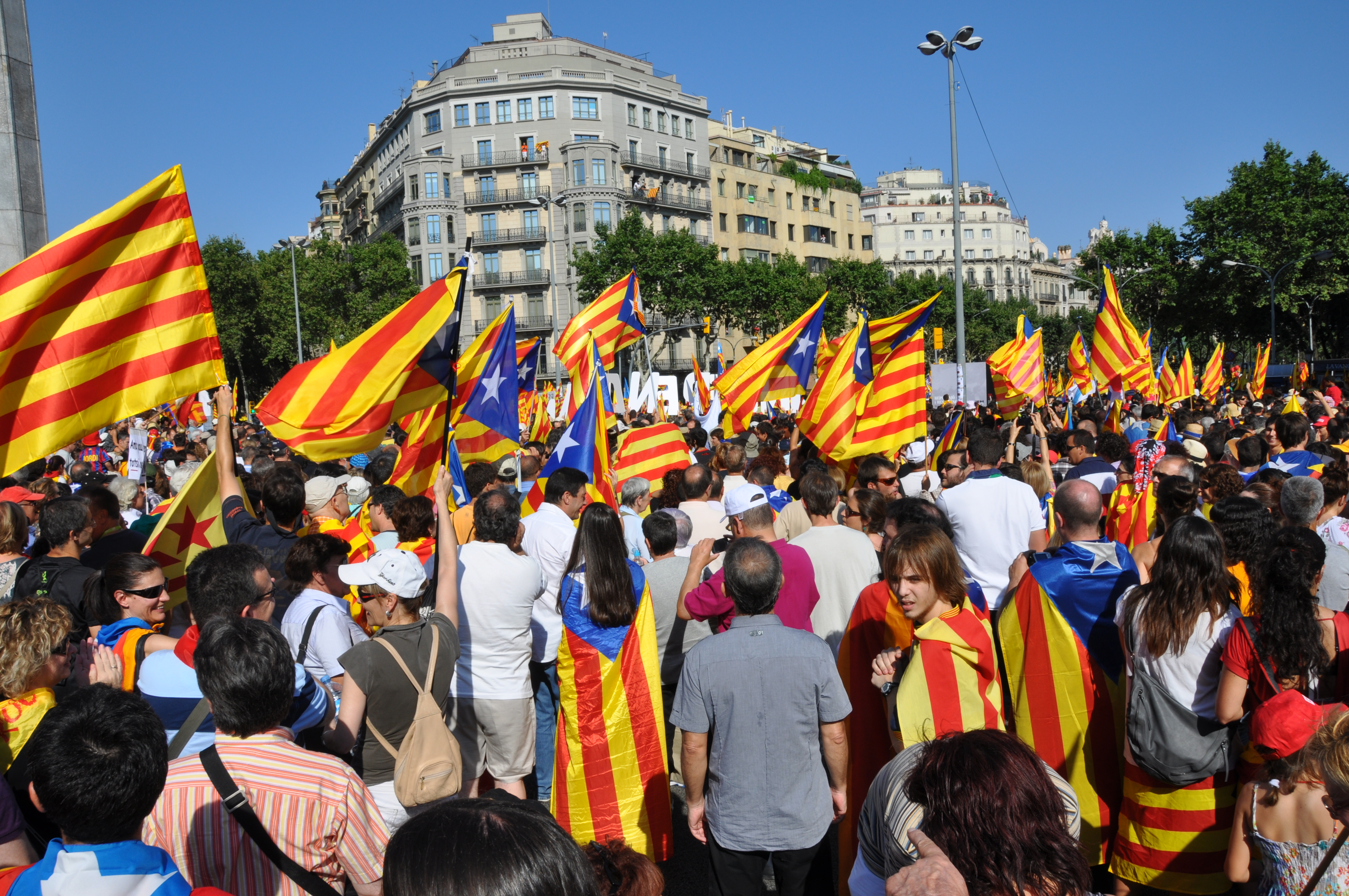
Support for Catalan independence is based on the idea that Catalonia, as a nation, has the right to the statehood.

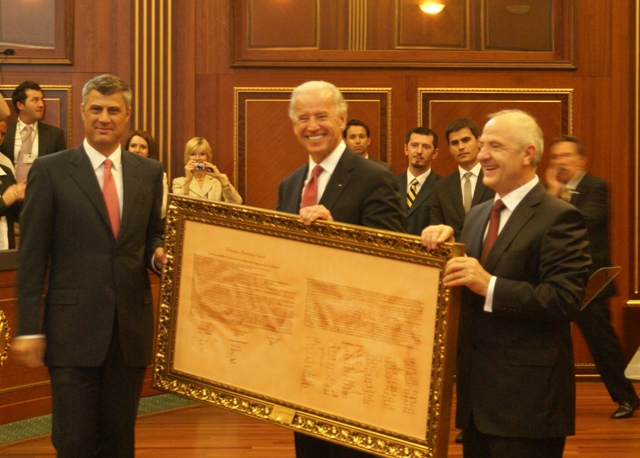
The former KLA leader Hashim Thaçi (left) and then-U.S. Vice President Joe Biden with Declaration of Independence of Kosovo

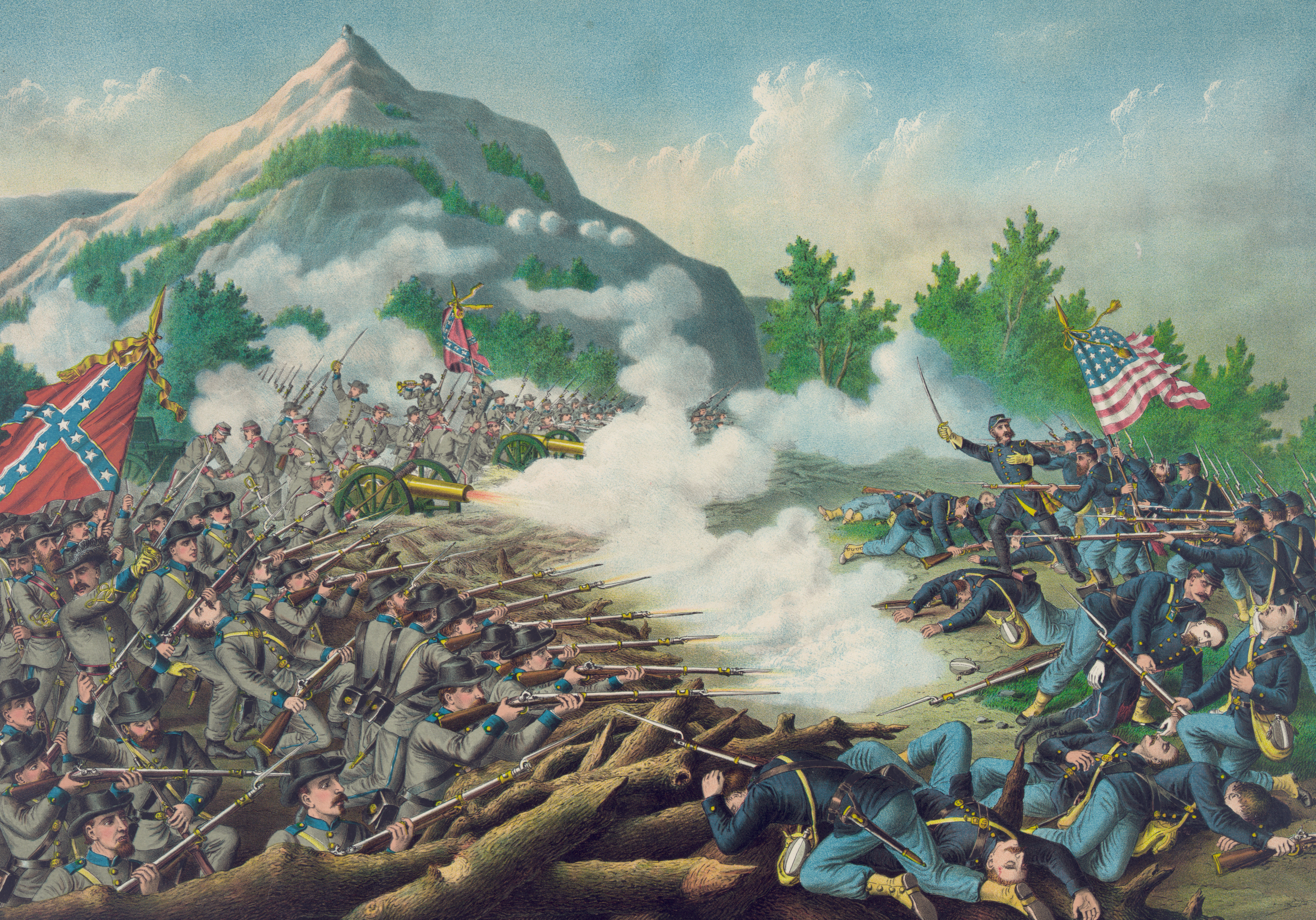
In 1861, the American Civil War started after a separatist movement of southern US states seceded from the United States.

Groups may have one or more motivations for separation, including:

- Emotional resentment and hatred of rival communities.
- Protection from genocide and ethnic cleansing.
- Resistance by victims of oppression, including denigration of their language, culture or religion.
- Influence and propaganda by those inside and outside the region who hope to gain politically from intergroup conflict and hatred.
- Economic and political dominance of one group that does not share power and privilege in an egalitarian fashion.
- Economic motivations: seeking to end economic exploitation by a more powerful group or, conversely, to escape economic redistribution from a richer to a poorer group.
- Preservation of threatened religious, language, or other cultural tradition.
- Destabilization from one separatist movement giving rise to others.
- Geopolitical power vacuum from breakup of larger states or empires.
- Continuing fragmentation as more and more states break up.
- Feeling that the perceived nation was added to the larger state by illegitimate means.
- The perception that the state can no longer support one's own group or has betrayed their interests.
- Opposition to political decisions.

== Types ==
Ethnic separatism can be based on cultural, linguistic, as well as religious or racial differences. Ethnic separatist movements were relevant since they represented historical delineations between states, or in recent times, were the cause of conflicts between peoples in Europe, Africa, and Asia with different ethnic/linguistic origins.

=== Separatism by continent ===
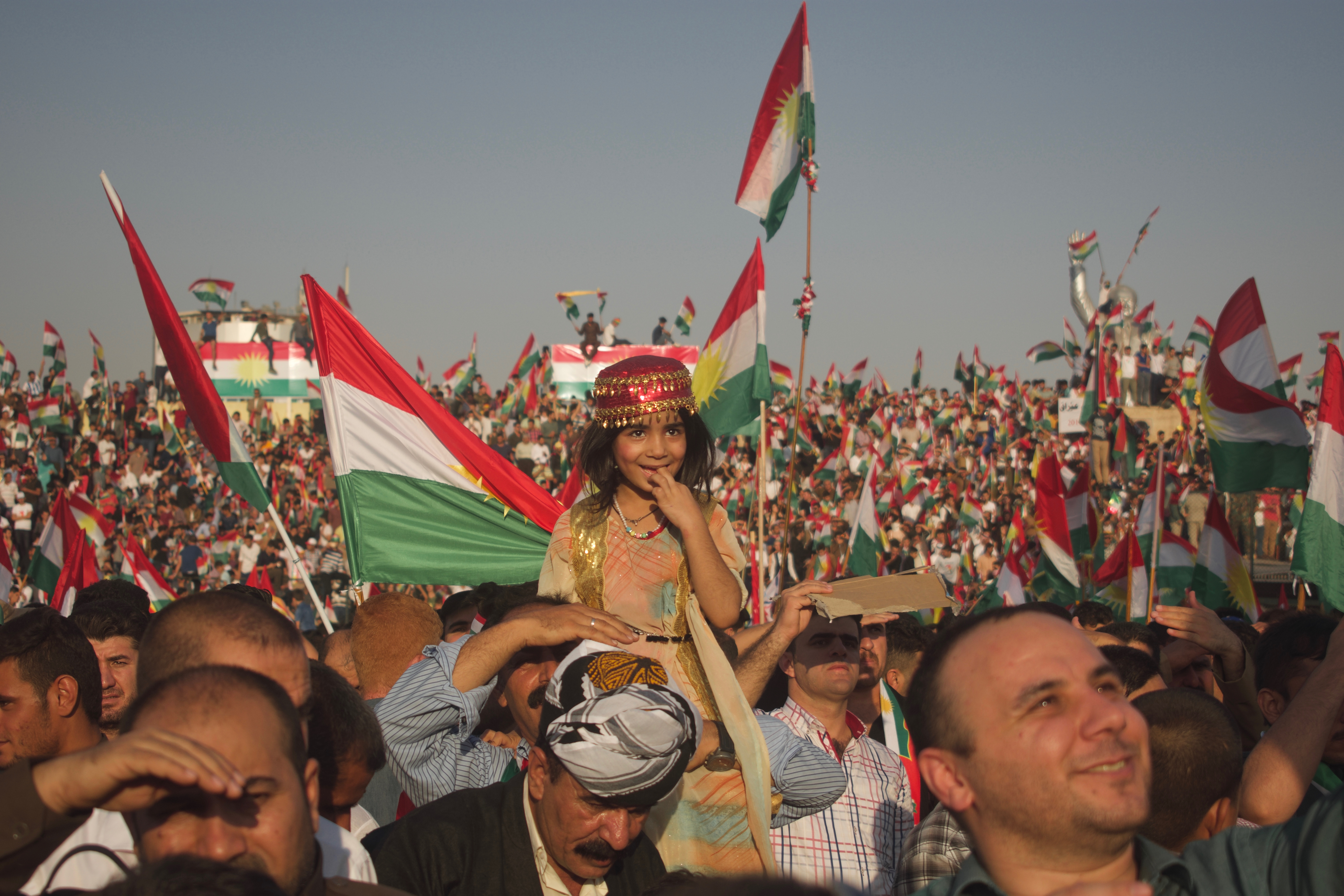
Pro-independence rally in Iraqi Kurdistan in September 2017

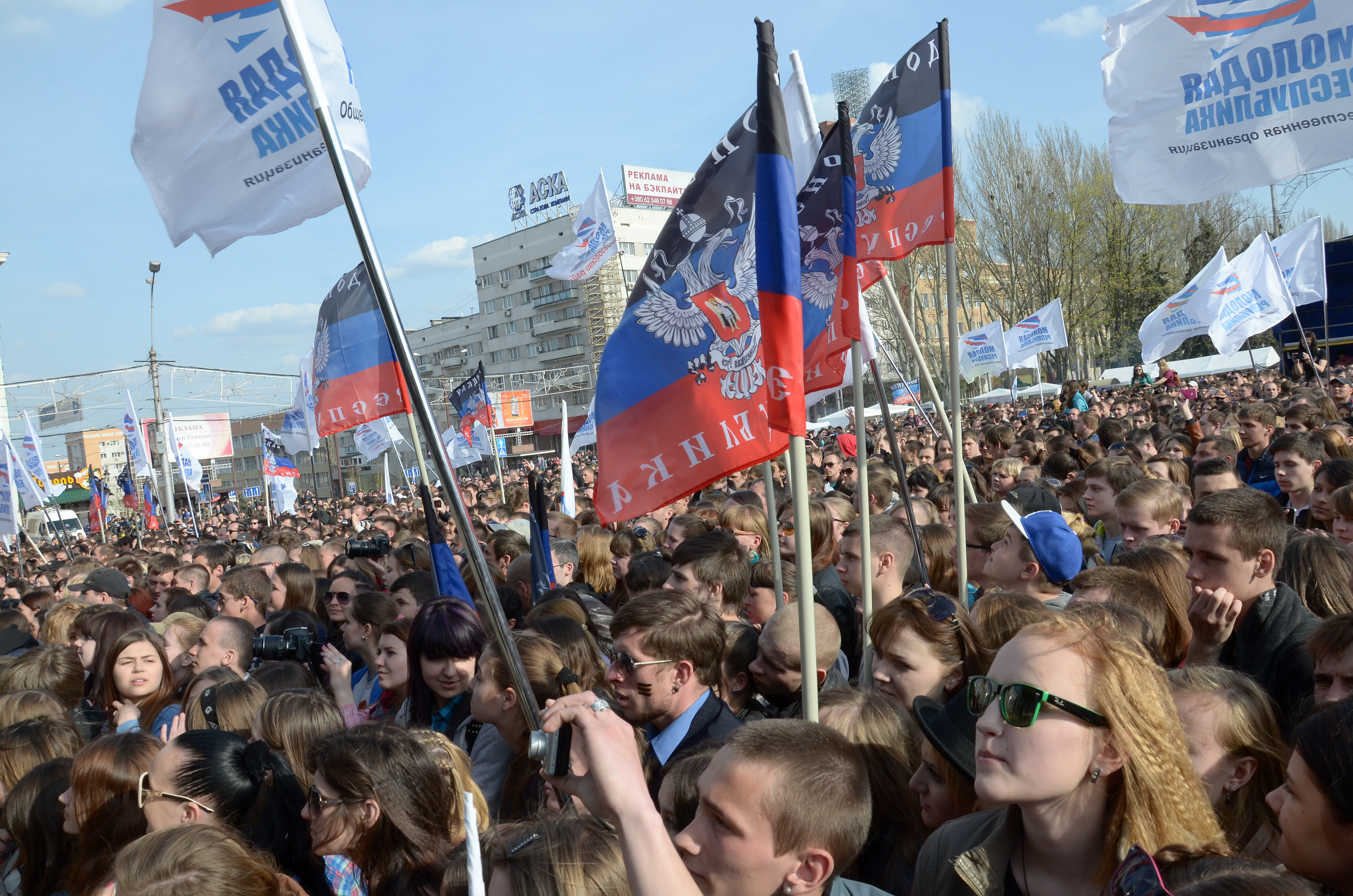
Pro-Russian separatists in Donetsk, eastern Ukraine, April 2015

- List of active separatist movements in Africa
- List of active separatist movements in Asia
- List of active separatist movements in Europe
- List of active separatist movements in North America
- List of active separatist movements in Oceania
- List of active separatist movements in South America

=== Gender separatism ===
The relationship between gender and separatism is complex. Feminist separatism is women's choosing to separate from ostensibly male-defined, male-dominated institutions, relationships, roles and activities. Lesbian separatism advocates lesbianism as the logical result of feminism. Some separatist feminists and lesbian separatists have chosen to live apart in intentional community, cooperatives, and on land trusts. Queer nationalism (or "Gay separatism") seeks a community distinct and separate from other social groups. On the other hand, the MGTOW movement is sometimes considered a male-gender separatism, as at the center of this ideology is the notion of male separatism where men should not be a part of a feminist-biased society. Some fringe elements even propose a utopian no-women state.

=== Geographical and socioeconomic separatism ===
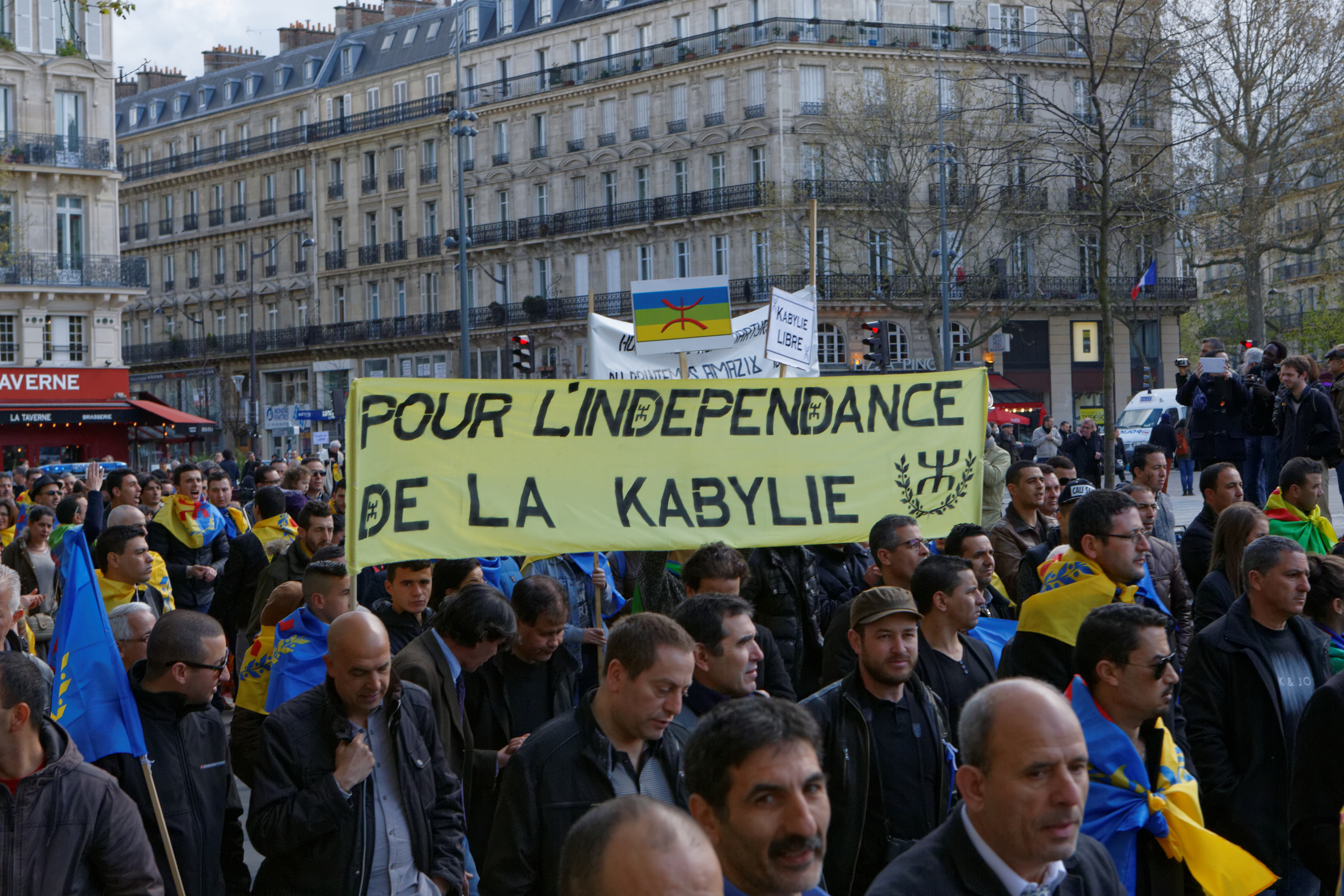
Kabyle protesters in Paris holding the Berber flag, April 2016

Some examples include:

- Alberta separatism
- Berber separatism in North Africa
- Bougainville independence movement
- Cape Independence
- Casamance independence movement
- Cascadian separatists
- Catalan independence movement
- Provisional Revolutionary Government of Cibao
- Euskadi (Basque Country) independence movement
- Hong Kong independence movement
- New England New State Movement
- Malaysian Sabah and Sarawak separatists
- West Papuan independence
- Free South movement
- Quebec sovereignty movement
- Scottish independence movement
- Taiwanese independence movement

=== Racial separatism ===
Some separatist groups seek to separate from others along racial lines. They oppose interracial marriage and integration with other races and seek separate schools, businesses, churches and other institutions, and often separate societies, territories, countries, and governments:

Territories considered for "Aztlán"

- Black separatism (also known as black nationalism) is the most prominent wave advancing the concepts of "Black racial identity" in the United States and has been advanced by black leaders like Marcus Garvey and organizations such as the Nation of Islam. Critical race theorists like New York University's Derrick Bell and University of Colorado's Richard Delgado argue that US legal, education, and political systems are rife with blatant racism. They support efforts like "all-black" schools and dorms and question the efficacy and merit of government-enforced integration. In 2008 statements by Barack Obama's former pastor Jeremiah Wright, Jr., revived the issue of the current relevance of black separatism.
- Latin American concepts of racial identity such as the bronze race and La Raza Cósmica are found in the small separatist Raza Unida Party. The Chicano Movement (or Chicano nation) in the United States sought to recreate Aztlán, the mythical homeland of the Aztecs comprising the Southwestern United States.
- White separatism in the United States and Western Europe seeks separation of the white race and limits to nonwhite immigration under the argument that these policies are necessary for the white race's survival.

=== Religious separatism ===
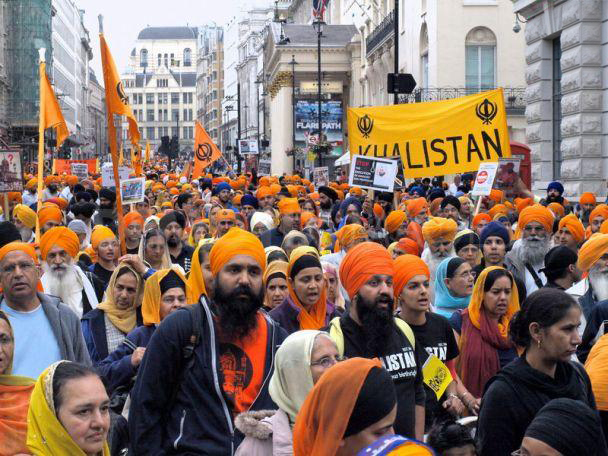
Sikhs in London protesting against the Indian government

Religious separatist groups and sects want to withdraw from some larger religious groups and/or believe they should interact primarily with coreligionists:

- English Christians in the 16th and 17th centuries who wished to separate from the Church of England and form independent local churches were influential politically under Oliver Cromwell, who was himself a separatist. They were eventually called Congregationalists. The Pilgrims who established the first successful colony in New England were separatists.
- Christian separatist groups in Indonesia, India and South Carolina (United States)
- Zionism sought the creation of the State of Israel as a Jewish homeland. Simon Dubnow, who had mixed feelings toward Zionism, formulated Jewish Autonomism, which was adopted in eastern Europe by Jewish political parties such as the Bund and his own Folkspartei before World War II. Zionism also has an ethnocultural component, as Judaism is an ethnoreligion, so its definition of who is Jewish includes people of Jewish background who do not practice the Jewish religion. In fact, many Zionists are not religious, and Zionism is not always a religious ideology.

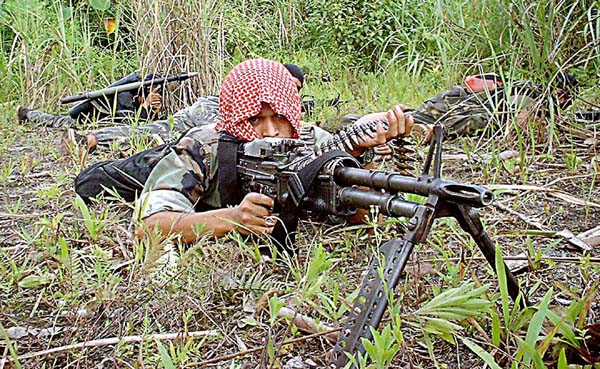
Moro Islamic Liberation Front fighter in the Philippines

- The partition of India arose as a result of separatism on the part of Muslims.
- The demand for an independent Sikh homeland called Khalistan emerged during the 1970s and 1980s amid political tensions in Punjab, India, particularly surrounding the Anandpur Sahib Resolution, which primarily sought greater autonomy for Punjab and the protection of Sikh identity within the India. Escalation occurred when armed militants led by Jarnail Singh Bhindranwale occupied the Golden Temple complex. In June 1984, the government of India launched Operation Blue Star to remove the militants from the site. The military action resulted in casualties, including civilians, and caused deep anguish among many Sikhs globally. Later that year, the assassination of Prime Minister Indira Gandhi by her Sikh bodyguards led to the tragic 1984 anti-Sikh riots, in which thousands of Sikhs were killed. While these events led to a rise in support for the Khalistan movement in some sections of the Sikh diaspora, the movement steadily declined in India by the 1990s. Today, Sikhs in India are equal citizens under the constitution, and actively contribute to the country's political, military, economic, and cultural life. The idea of Khalistan holds little to no support among Indian Sikhs, and is generally viewed as a fringe movement, largely sustained by diaspora activism abroad. Attempts to revive it within India have consistently failed to gain traction.
- Muslim separatist groups in the Philippines (Mindanao and other regions: Moro Islamic Liberation Front, Abu Sayyaf), in Thailand (see also South Thailand insurgency), in India (see also Insurgency in Jammu and Kashmir), in the People's Republic of China (Xinjiang: East Turkestan Islamic Movement), Tanzania (Zanzibarian separatist movements), in the Central African Republic (Regions that are inhabited by Muslims: Séléka), in Russia (in the Northern Caucasus, especially in Chechnya: Caucasus Emirate), in Yugoslavia (Bosnia and Herzegovina: Alija Izetbegovic espoused an Islamic inspired separatism)

== Governmental responses ==
Spectrum from separatism to regional integration

How far separatist demands will go toward full independence, and whether groups pursue constitutional and nonviolent action or armed violence, depend on a variety of economic, political, social and cultural factors, including movement leadership and the government's response. Governments may respond in several ways, some of which are mutually exclusive. Some include:

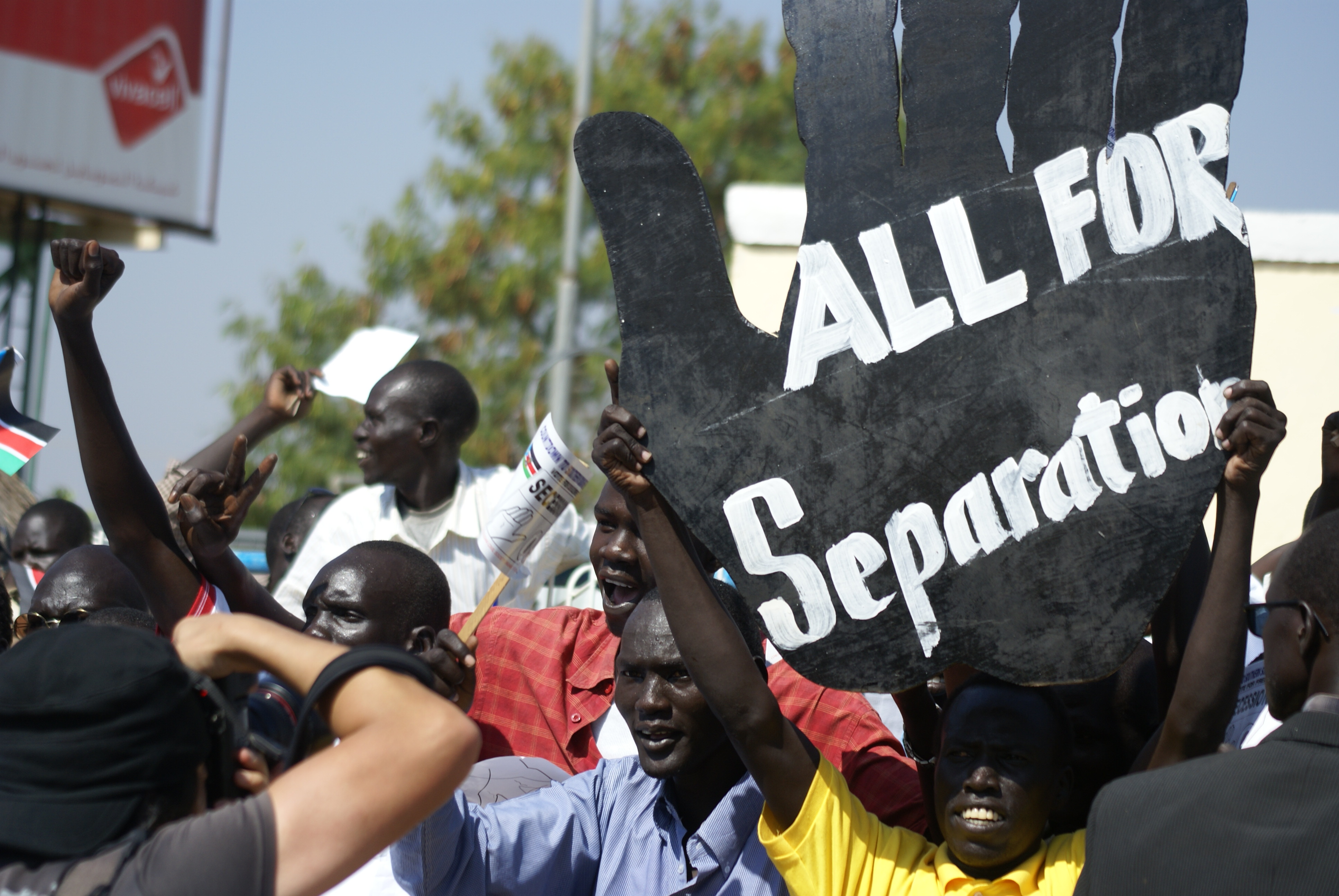
South Sudanese independence referendum in 2011 marked the end of South Sudan's long struggle for independence.

- accede to separatist demands, independence
- improve the circumstances of disadvantaged minorities, be they religious, linguistic, territorial, economic or political
- adopt "asymmetric federalism" where different states have different relations to the central government depending on separatist demands or considerations
- allow minorities to win in political disputes about which they feel strongly, through parliamentary voting, referendum, etc.
- settle for a confederation or a commonwealth relationship where there are only limited ties among states.

== See also ==
=== Lists ===
- Lists of separatist movements
  - Lists of active separatist movements
    - List of active separatist movements recognized by intergovernmental organizations
  - List of historical separatist movements
- List of states with limited recognition
- Lists of ethnic groups
  - List of indigenous peoples

=== General ===
- Annexation
- Autonomism (political doctrine)
- Ethnic nationalism
- Ethnic minority
- Ethnocentrism
- Homeland
- Identity politics
- Intersectionality
- Kinship
- Language secessionism
- Micronation
- Military occupation
- Multiculturalism
- Minority group
- Nation
- Polarization
- Partition
- Refugee
- Secession
- Segregation
- Stateless nation
- Unrepresented Nations and Peoples Organization
