= Hadramout National Council =

Yemeni political organization

HNC مجلس حضرموت الوطني
- Abbreviation: NHC
- Founders: Hadhrami Governor and political/tribal leaders
- Registered: June 20, 2023; 23 months ago

Hadramout National Council (HNC; Arabic: مجلس حضرموت الوطني), is a political entity formed by Hadhrami political and tribal leaders in Riyadh, Saudi Arabia.

The formation of the Hadramout National Council is seen by some Saudi response to counter United Arab Emirates influence in the southern region, as the Southern Transitional Council serves UAE interests in Yemen and potentially as a way to address regional dynamics within Yemen. Hadramout, the largest governorate in Yemen, holds strategic significance for the parties involved in the region.

== See also ==
- Southern Transitional Council
- Federalization of Yemen
- Hadhramaut
- Hadhramaut Governorate
- Yemeni Crisis (2011–present)
