= 1954 in Malaya =

- Decades: 1930s; 1940s; 1950s; 1960s
- See also: Other events of 1954; History of Malaysia • Timeline • Years

This article lists important figures and events in Malayan public affairs during the year 1954, as well as births and deaths of significant Malayans.

== Incumbent political figures ==
=== Central level ===
- Governor of Malaya :
  - Gerald Templer (until 31 May)
  - Donald Charles MacGillivray (from 31 May)
- Chief Minister Federation of Malaya :
  - Tunku Abdul Rahman Putra Al-Haj

=== State level ===
- Perlis :
  - Raja of Perlis : Syed Harun Putra Jamalullail
  - Menteri Besar of Perlis : Raja Ahmad Raja Endut
- Johore :
  - Sultan of Johor : Sultan Ibrahim Al-Masyhur
  - Menteri Besar of Johor : Syed Abdul Kadir Mohamed
- Kedah :
  - Sultan of Kedah : Sultan Badlishah
  - Menteri Besar of Kedah :
    - Mohamad Sheriff Osman (until January)
    - Tunku Ismail Tunku Yahya (from January)
- Kelantan :
  - Sultan of Kelantan : Sultan Ibrahim
  - Menteri Besar of Kelantan : Tengku Muhammad Hamzah Raja Muda Long Zainal Abidin
- Trengganu :
  - Sultan of Trengganu : Sultan Ismail Nasiruddin Shah
  - Menteri Besar of Terengganu : Raja Kamaruddin Idris
- Selangor :
  - Sultan of Selangor : Sultan Sir Hishamuddin Alam Shah Al-Haj
  - Menteri Besar of Selangor :
    - Othman Mohamad (until September)
    - Raja Uda Raja Muhammad (from September)
- Penang :
  - Monarchs : Queen Elizabeth II
  - Residents-Commissioner : Robert Porter Bingham
- Malacca :
  - Monarchs : Queen Elizabeth II
  - Residents-Commissioner : Maurice John Hawyard (Acting)
- Negri Sembilan :
  - Yang di-Pertuan Besar of Negeri Sembilan : Tuanku Abdul Rahman ibni Almarhum Tuanku Muhammad
  - Menteri Besar Negeri Sembilan : Shamsuddin Naim
- Pahang :
  - Sultan of Pahang : Sultan Abu Bakar
  - Menteri Besar of Pahang : Tengku Mohamad Sultan Ahmad
- Perak :
  - British Adviser of Perak : Ian Blelloch
  - Sultan of Perak : Sultan Yusuf Izzuddin Shah
  - Menteri Besar of Perak : Abdul Wahab Toh Muda Abdul Aziz

== Events ==
- February – Parti Negara formed by Dato' Onn Jaafar.
- 6 March – Port Dickson and Rembau in Negeri Sembilan are declared White Areas.
- 3 April – Town councils election is held in Pasir Mas, Kelantan.
- 1 May – Film Censorship Board of Malaysia is established as Malayan Censorship Board.
- May – Bourne School, Kuala Lumpur is established.
- 1 May - 9 May – Malaya competed for the first time in the 1954 Asian Games held in Manila, Philippines with 9 competitors in 1 sport.
- 3 July – Town councils election in Kota Bharu, Kelantan.
- 8 July – Operation Termite.
- 21 July – Town councils election is held in Kuantan, Pahang.
- 11 August – Institut Pendidikan Guru Malaysia Kampus Kota Bharu is established as Maktab Penguruan Kota Bharu.
- 15 August – Town councils election is held in Ipoh-Menglembu, Taiping and Teluk Anson in Perak.
- 10 October – Johore state election.
- 29 October – Trengganu state election.
- 6 November – Town councils election is held in Segamat, Johor.
- 4 December – Local municipal election is held in George Town, Kuala Lumpur and Malacca.
- 4 December – Town councils election is held in Bukit Mertajam and Butterworth, Penang; Muar, Bandar Penggaram, Johor Baharu, Kluang in Johor; Klang, Selangor; and Seremban, Negeri Sembilan.
- Unknown date – Hang Tuah Stadium completed and officially opened.
- Unknown date – SMK Pendidikan Khas Persekutuan is established as Federation School for the Deaf. Its become first school deaf in Malaya.
- Unknown date – Election Offences Act 1954 is enforced.

== Births ==
- 18 February – Jalaluddin Hassan – Actor
- 24 April – Yusof Haslam – Film director and actor
- 29 April – M. Kayveas – Politician
- 15 May – Mohamed Nazri Abdul Aziz – Politician
- 25 May – Sudirman Arshad – Singer (died 1992)
- 14 June – Zulkifeli Mohd. Zin – Commander of Angkatan Tentera Malaysia
- 14 October – Mohamad Sabu – Politician

== Deaths ==
- 12 February - Tengku Mahmood Mahyideen - Politician

== See also ==
- 1954
- 1953 in Malaya | 1955 in Malaya
- History of Malaysia
