= 1953 in Malaya =

- Decades: 1930s; 1940s; 1950s; 1960s
- See also: Other events of 1953; History of Malaysia • Timeline • Years

This article lists important figures and events in Malayan public affairs during the year 1953, together with births and deaths of significant Malayans.

== Incumbent political figures ==
=== Central level ===
- Governor of Malaya :
  - Sir Gerald Templer
- Chief Minister of Malaya :
  - Tunku Abdul Rahman Putra

=== State level ===
- Perlis :
  - Raja of Perlis : Syed Harun Putra Jamalullail
  - Menteri Besar of Perlis : Raja Ahmad Raja Endut
- (Johor) Johore :
  - Sultan of Johore : Sultan Ibrahim Al-Masyhur
  - Menteri Besar of Johore : Syed Abdul Kadir Mohamed
- Kedah :
  - Sultan of Kedah : Sultan Badlishah
  - Menteri Besar of Kedah : Mohamad Sheriff Osman
- Kelantan :
  - Sultan of Kelantan : Sultan Ibrahim
  - Menteri Besar of Kelantan :
    - Nik Ahmad Kamil Nik Mahmud (until unknown date)
    - Tengku Muhammad Hamzah Raja Muda Long Zainal Abidin (from unknown date)
- (Terengganu) Trengganu :
  - Sultan of Trengganu : Sultan Ismail Nasiruddin Shah
  - Menteri Besar of Trengganu : Raja Kamaruddin Idris
- Selangor :
  - Sultan of Selangor : Sultan Sir Hishamuddin Alam Shah Al-Haj
  - Menteri Besar of Selangor :
    - Raja Uda Raja Muhammad (until March)
    - Othman Mohamad (from March)
- Penang :
  - Monarchs : Queen Elizabeth II
  - Residents-Commissioner : Robert Porter Bingham
- Malacca :
  - Monarchs : Queen Elizabeth II
  - Residents-Commissioner :
- (Negeri Sembilan) Negri Sembilan :
  - Yang di-Pertuan Besar of Negri Sembilan : Tuanku Abdul Rahman ibni Almarhum Tuanku Muhammad
  - Menteri Besar Negri Sembilan :
    - Abdul Malek Yusuf (until 1 October)
    - Shamsuddin Naim (from 1 OCtober)
- Pahang :
  - Sultan of Pahang : Sultan Abu Bakar
  - Menteri Besar of Pahang : Tengku Mohamad Sultan Ahmad
- Perak :
  - British Adviser of Perak : Ian Blelloch
  - Sultan of Perak : Sultan Yusuf Izzuddin Shah
  - Menteri Besar of Perak : Abdul Wahab Toh Muda Abdul Aziz

== Events ==
- 26 March – Opening of Connaught Bridge Power Station by Sir Gerald Templer in Klang, Selangor.
- 10 April – The People's Progressive Party was founded by D. R. Seenivasagam.
- 3 June – St. Gabriel's Secondary School was established by Brother Louis Gonzaga.
- 6 July – Beatty Secondary School was established.
- 5 December – Local municipal election were held in George Town, Kuala Lumpur and Malacca.
- Unknown date – Dato' Onn Jaafar dissolved the Independence of Malaya Party (formed Parti Negara in 1954).
- Unknown date – Johor Bahru Tengah Municipal Council was established.
- Unknown date – The Malaya and British Borneo dollar was introduced.
- Unknown date – The Olympic Council of Malaysia was established as Federation of Malaya Olympic Council.
- Unknown date – Tanjong Katong Girls' School was established.
- Unknown date – The Betting Act 1953 was enacted.
- Unknown date – The Common Gaming Houses Act 1953 was enacted.
- Unknown date – The Criminal Justice Act 1953 was enacted.
- Unknown date – The flag of Terengannu was changed to its modern-day counterpart

== Births ==
- 1 January – Azmil Mustapha – Actor
- 2 January – Mustaffa Noor – Actor (died 1990)
- 4 January – Ahmad Zahid Hamidi – Politician and 11th Deputy Prime Minister of Malaysia (2015–2018)
- 31 January – R. Arumugam – Footballer (died 1988)
- 14 February – Raja Nong Chik Raja Zainal Abidin – Politician
- 1 April – S. Subramaniam – Politician
- 15 April – Hussin Ismail – Deputy Inspector General of Police
- 17 May – Ismail Omar – 9th Inspector General of Police
- 22 June – Santokh Singh – Footballer
- 26 June – Fauziah Nawi – Actor
- 2 July – Sharifah Aini – Singer (died 2014)
- 16 July – Ahmad Fuad Ismail – Mayor of Kuala Lumpur
- 23 July – Najib Razak – Sixth Prime Minister of Malaysia (2009-2018), also son of second Prime Minister Tun Abdul Razak
- 20 October – Awang Sariyan – Linguist
- 26 October – Maximus Ongkili – Politician
- 13 November – Mokhtar Dahari – Footballer (died 1991)
- 16 November – Anifah Aman – Politician
- 23 November – Nasir P. Ramlee – Actor and son of P.Ramlee. (died 2008)
- Unknown date – Julie Dahlan – Actor (died 2015)
- Unknown date – Pandikar Amin Mulia – Politician and former Parliament speaker
- Unknown date – Roslan Md. Yusof – Politician

== Deaths ==
- 30 January — Mat Indera, MNLA Commander who lead during the Bukit Kepong Incident
- October — William Kuok, second brother of Robert Kuok and a prominent member of the Malayan Communist Party
- Dates unknown
  - Lau Mah, Commander of the 12th MNLA Regiment
  - Lim Chew Yik, Politburo member of the Malayan Communist Party

== See also ==
- 1953
- 1952 in Malaya | 1954 in Malaya
- History of Malaysia
