= 1952 in Malaya =

- Decades: 1930s; 1940s; 1950s; 1960s
- See also: Other events of 1952; History of Malaysia • Timeline • Years

This article lists important figures and events in Malayan public affairs during the year 1952, together with births and deaths of significant Malayans.

== Incumbent political figures ==
=== Central level ===
- Monarch of the United Kingdom
  - King George VI (until 6 February)
  - Queen Elizabeth II(starting 6 February)
- Governor of Malaya :
  - Vacant (until 15 January)
  - Sir Gerald Templer (from 15 January)
- Chief Minister of Malaya :
  - Tunku Abdul Rahman Putra

=== State level ===
- Perlis :
  - Raja of Perlis : Syed Harun Putra Jamalullail
  - Menteri Besar of Perlis : Raja Ahmad Raja Endut
- Johore :
  - Sultan of Johor : Sultan Ibrahim Al-Masyhur
  - Menteri Besar of Johore :
    - Vacant (until 18 February)
    - Syed Abdul Kadir Mohamed (from 18 February)
- Kedah :
  - Sultan of Kedah : Sultan Badlishah
  - Menteri Besar of Kedah : Mohamad Sheriff Osman
- Kelantan :
  - Sultan of Kelantan : Sultan Ibrahim
  - Menteri Besar of Kelantan : Nik Ahmad Kamil Nik Mahmud
- (Terengganu) Trengganu :
  - Sultan of Trengganu : Sultan Ismail Nasiruddin Shah
  - Menteri Besar of Trengganu : Raja Kamaruddin Idris
- Selangor :
  - Sultan of Selangor : Sultan Sir Hishamuddin Alam Shah Al-Haj
  - Menteri Besar of Selangor : Raja Uda Raja Muhammad
- Penang :
  - Monarchs :
    - King George VI (until 6 February)
    - Queen Elizabeth II (from 6 February)
  - Residents-Commissioner : Robert Porter Bingham
- Malacca :
  - Monarchs :
    - King George VI (until 6 February)
    - Queen Elizabeth II (from 6 February)
  - Residents-Commissioner :
- (Negeri Sembilan) Negri Sembilan :
  - Yang di-Pertuan Besar of Negri Sembilan : Tuanku Abdul Rahman ibni Almarhum Tuanku Muhammad
  - Menteri Besar Negri Sembilan :
    - Abdul Aziz Abdul Majid (until 1 October)
    - Abdul Malek Yusuf (from 1 October)
- Pahang :
  - Sultan of Pahang : Sultan Abu Bakar
  - Menteri Besar of Pahang : Tengku Mohamad Sultan Ahmad
- Perak :
  - British Adviser of Perak : Ian Blelloch
  - Sultan of Perak : Sultan Yusuf Izzuddin Shah
  - Menteri Besar of Perak : Abdul Wahab Toh Muda Abdul Aziz

== Events ==
- 17 March – The Pan-Malayan Religious-Studies Teachers Union was formed.
- 24 March – Civil Defence Department was established for carrying out the provisions of the Ordinance.
- 29 May – Houses of Parliament (Privileges and Powers) Act 1952 was enacted.
- 30 May – The Rubber Trade Association of the Federation of Malaya was formed.
- 31 May–1 June – 1952 Thomas Cup. Malaya won this edition, defeating United States.
- June – The Labour Party of Malaya was founded by Lee Moke Sang.
- 3 July – Royal Military College (Malaysia) was established.
- November – The Dangerous Drugs Act 1952 was enacted.
- 21 November – The Education Ordinance 1952 was enacted.
- 22 November – An ordinance on immigration law was passed to consolidate the law relating to and further regulate immigration into the Federation of Malaya.
- 6 December – Local municipal election were held in six municipal and town councils in the Federation of Malaya.
- Unknown date – The Alliance Party (Malaysia) was founded.
- Unknown date – The Malaysian Amateur Radio Transmitters' Society was founded.
- Unknown date – Construction began on Melaka International Airport, the main airport in Malacca.
- Unknown date – Simpang Airport was built and served as the main airport in Kuala Lumpur until it was replaced by Subang International Airport in 1965

== Births ==
- 28 February – Raja Nadzatul Shima – First son of Sultan Idris Shah and Raja Muzwim
- 23 March – Anita Sarawak – Singer and host
- 1 April – Poh Ah Tiam, politician, businessman and community leader (died 2007)
- 21 April – Noorainee Abdul Rahman – wife of Muhyiddin Yassin
- 30 May – Abdul Rahman Bakar – Politician
- 11 August – Aida Khalida – Actor
- 9 September – Hasbullah Awang – Sport commentator (died 2015)
- 15 October – Ramli Sarip – Singer
- 3 December – Wan Azizah Wan Ismail – Politician and wife of Anwar Ibrahim
- 25 December – Isa Bakar, football player (died 2010)
- 26 December – Reduan Abdullah – Footballer

== See also ==
- 1952
- 1951 in Malaya | 1953 in Malaya
- History of Malaysia
