= 1951 in Malaya =

- Decades: 1930s; 1940s; 1950s; 1960s
- See also: Other events of 1951; History of Malaysia • Timeline • Years

This article lists important figures and events in Malayan public affairs during the year 1951, together with births and deaths of significant Malayans.

== Incumbent political figures ==
=== Central level ===
- Governor of Malaya :
  - Henry Gurney (until 6 October)
  - Vacant (from 6 October)
- Chief Minister of Malaya :
  - Tunku Abdul Rahman Putra

=== State level ===
- Perlis :
  - Raja of Perlis : Syed Harun Putra Jamalullail
  - Menteri Besar of Perlis : Raja Ahmad Raja Endut
- Johore :
  - Sultan of Johor : Sultan Ibrahim Al-Masyhur
  - Menteri Besar of Johore : Vacant
- Kedah :
  - Sultan of Kedah : Sultan Badlishah
  - Menteri Besar of Kedah : Mohamad Sheriff Osman
- Kelantan :
  - Sultan of Kelantan : Sultan Ibrahim
  - Menteri Besar of Kelantan : Nik Ahmad Kamil Nik Mahmud
- (Terengganu) Trengganu :
  - Sultan of Trengganu : Sultan Ismail Nasiruddin Shah
  - Menteri Besar of Trengganu : Raja Kamaruddin Idris
- Selangor :
  - Sultan of Selangor : Sultan Sir Hishamuddin Alam Shah Al-Haj
  - Menteri Besar of Selangor : Raja Uda Raja Muhammad
- Penang :
  - Monarchs : King George VI
  - Residents-Commissioner :
    - Arthur Vincent Aston (until unknown date)
    - Robert Porter Bingham (from unknown date)
- Malacca :
  - Monarchs : King George VI
  - Residents-Commissioner :
- (Negeri Sembilan) Negri Sembilan :
  - Yang di-Pertuan Besar of Negri Sembilan : Tuanku Abdul Rahman ibni Almarhum Tuanku Muhammad
  - Menteri Besar Negri Sembilan :
    - Muhammad Salleh Sulaiman (until 1 January)
    - Abdul Aziz Abdul Majid (from 1 August)
- Pahang :
  - Sultan of Pahang : Sultan Abu Bakar
  - Menteri Besar of Pahang :
    - Mahmud Mat (until 1 February)
    - Tengku Mohamad Sultan Ahmad (from 1 February)
- Perak :
  - British Adviser of Perak :
    - James Innes Miller (until unknown date)
    - Ian Blelloch (from unknown date)
  - Sultan of Perak : Sultan Yussuf Izzuddin Shah
  - Menteri Besar of Perak : Abdul Wahab Toh Muda Abdul Aziz

== Events ==
- 18 April – Perak TBG F.C. was officially registered by Perak Amateur Football Association (PAFA).
- 21 July – SMJK Seg Hwa was founded by Segamat Chinese community.
- 6 October – Sir Henry Gurney was assassinated by Communist rebels during his vacation at Fraser's Hill, Pahang.
- 24 November – The Pan-Malaysian Islamic Party (PAS) was founded by the Pan-Malayan Islamic Organisation.
- 22 December – The Selangor Labour Party was founded (dissolved in 1952).
- Unknown date – The Garden International School was founded by Mrs Sally Watkins. This was first school catering to expats and the oldest prestigious school in the Federation of Malaya.
- Unknown date – The Independence of Malaya Party was founded by Dato' Onn Jaafar (dissolved in 1953).
- Unknown date – The Penang Rubber Exchange became officially known as the Rubber Trade Association of Penang, sanctioned by the Registrar of Societies.

== Births ==
- 25 January – Ibrahim Ali – Politician
- 3 March – Botak Chin – Criminal (died 1981)
- 5 March – Lat – Famous cartoonist
- 10 March – Salamiah Hassan – Singer
- 12 March – Ilyas Din – 13th Commander Royal Malaysian Navy
- 30 March – Musa Aman – 14th Chief Minister of Sabah
- 25 May – Jamaluddin Jarjis – Politician and ambassador (died 2015)
- 10 June – Bad Latiff – Actor (died 2005)
- 24 June – Mohd Sidek Hassan – Former Secretary of State
- 16 July
  - Che Rosli, politician
  - Mohd Fadzillah Kamsah – Motivator expert
- 26 August – Abdul Aziz Ismail – 14th Commander Malaysia Armed Forces (2007-2009)
- 1 December – Richard Riot Jaem – Politician
- 10 December – Rosmah Mansor – Spouse 6th Prime Minister of Malaysia, Najib Razak (2009–present)
- Unknown date – Ali Mamak – Actor and comedian (died 2014)
- Unknown date – Christopher Wan Soo Kee – Director of Bukit Aman Criminal Investigation Department
- Unknown date – Badruddin Amiruldin – Politician
- Unknown date – Ismail Din – Actor (died 2005)
- Unknown date – Syed Mokhtar Al-Bukhary – Businessman and millionaire

== Deaths ==
- 6 October – Sir Henry Gurney – British High Commissioner

== See also ==
- 1951
- 1950 in Malaya | 1952 in Malaya
- History of Malaysia
