= 1950 in Malaya =

- Decades: 1930s; 1940s; 1950s; 1960s
- See also: Other events of 1950; History of Malaysia • Timeline • Years

This article lists important figures and events in Malayan public affairs during the year 1950, together with births and deaths of significant Malayans.

== Incumbent political figures ==
=== Central level ===
- Governor of Malaya :
  - Henry Gurney
- Chief Minister of Malaya :
  - Tunku Abdul Rahman Putra

=== State level ===
- Perlis :
  - Raja of Perlis : Syed Harun Putra Jamalullail
  - Menteri Besar of Perlis : Raja Ahmad Raja Endut
- Johore :
  - Sultan of Johor : Sultan Ibrahim Al-Masyhur
  - Menteri Besar of Johore :
    - Onn Jaafar (until 18 May)
    - Vacant (from 18 May)
- Kedah :
  - Sultan of Kedah : Sultan Badlishah
  - Menteri Besar of Kedah : Mohamad Sheriff Osman
- Kelantan :
  - Sultan of Kelantan : Sultan Ibrahim
  - Menteri Besar of Kelantan : Nik Ahmad Kamil Nik Mahmud
- (Terengganu) Trengganu :
  - Sultan of Trengganu : Sultan Ismail Nasiruddin Shah
  - Menteri Besar of Trengganu : Raja Kamaruddin Idris
- Selangor :
  - Sultan of Selangor : Sultan Sir Hishamuddin Alam Shah Al-Haj
  - Menteri Besar of Selangor : Raja Uda Raja Muhammad
- Penang :
  - Monarchs : King George VI
  - Residents-Commissioner : Arthur Vincent Aston
- Malacca :
  - Monarchs : King George VI
  - Residents-Commissioner :
- (Negeri Sembilan) Negri Sembilan :
  - Yang di-Pertuan Besar of Negri Sembilan : Tuanku Abdul Rahman ibni Almarhum Tuanku Muhammad
  - Menteri Besar Negri Sembilan :
    - Abdul Malek Yusuf (until 15 August)
    - Muhammad Salleh Sulaiman (from 15 August)
- Pahang :
  - Sultan of Pahang : Sultan Abu Bakar
  - Menteri Besar of Pahang : Mahmud Mat
- Perak :
  - British Adviser of Perak : James Innes Miller
  - Sultan of Perak : Sultan Yussuf Izzuddin Shah
  - Menteri Besar of Perak : Abdul Wahab Toh Muda Abdul Aziz

== Events ==
- 22 January – Penang ambush.
- 22 January - Labis incident.
- 4–11 February - Malaya competed for the first time in the 1950 British Empire Games in Auckland, New Zealand. The Malaya team had most success in weightlifting, with two gold medals, one silver and one bronze.
- 23 February – The Bukit Kepong Incident took place in Bukit Kepong, Muar, Johor.
- 25 March – The Battle of Semur River.
- March – Lt. Gen. Harold Rawdon Briggs was appointed Director of Operations in Malaya.
- Unknown date – The Evidence Act 1950 was enacted.

== Births ==
- 24 January – Abdul Aziz Mohd Yusof – Director of Election Commission and Secretary of Ministry of Home Affair
- 11 February – Ainon Mohd – Writer
- 27 February – Azean Irdawaty – Actress and singer (died 2013)
- 5 March – Jamil bin Osman – Rector and CEO Kolej Universiti Insaniah, Kedah
- 10 April – Rahim Thamby Chik – Politician and former Chief Minister of Malacca
- 18 April – Adnan Yaakob – Menteri Besar of Pahang
- 4 August – Abang Johari Tun Openg – Politician and Chief Minister of Sarawak
- 18 August – Abu Bakar Chik – Politician
- 25 September – Mustapa Mohamed – Politician
- 27 September – Raja Petra Kamaruddin – Blogger
- 16 December – Yaakub bin Md Amin – Former Chairman Committee of State Education, Science & Technology and Human Resource Malacca
- Unknown date – Ahmad Tarmimi Siregar – Actor
- Unknown date – Habsah Hassan – Lyrics writer
- Unknown date – Wan Hanafi Su – Actor

== Deaths ==
- 23 February – Jamil Mohd Shah – Police Chief of Bukit Kepong
- 1 December – Chung Aike – Secretary of the Perak State Committee of the Malayan Communist Party

== See also ==
- 1950
- 1949 in Malaya | 1951 in Malaya
- History of Malaysia
