= 1948 in Malaya =

- Decades: 1930s; 1940s; 1950s; 1960s
- See also: Other events of 1948; History of Malaysia • Timeline • Years

This article lists important figures and events in Malayan public affairs during the year 1948, together with births and deaths of significant Malayans. Malaya left the British colonial Malayan Union; the Federation of Malaya took place on 1 February.

== Incumbent political figures ==
=== Central level ===
- Governor of Malaya :
  - Edward Gent – (until 4 July)
  - Henry Gurney – (from 1 October)
- Chief Minister Federation of Malaya :
  - Tunku Abdul Rahman Putra Al-Haj (from 1 February)

=== State level ===
- Perlis :
  - Raja of Perlis : Syed Harun Putra Jamalullail
  - Menteri Besar of Perlis : Raja Ahmad Raja Endut (from 1 February)
- Johore :
  - Sultan of Johor : Sultan Ibrahim Al-Masyhur
  - Menteri Besar of Johore : Onn Jaafar
- Kedah :
  - Sultan of Kedah : Sultan Badlishah
  - Menteri Besar of Kedah : Mohamad Sheriff Osman (from 1 February)
- Kelantan :
  - Sultan of Kelantan : Sultan Ibrahim
  - Menteri Besar of Kelantan : Nik Ahmad Kamil Nik Mahmud
- Terengganu :
  - Sultan of Terengganu : Sultan Ismail Nasiruddin Shah
  - Menteri Besar of Trengganu : Tengku Mohamad Sultan Ahmad
- Selangor :
  - Sultan of Selangor : Sultan Sir Hishamuddin Alam Shah Al-Haj
  - Menteri Besar of Selangor : Hamzah Abdullah
- Penang :
  - Monarchs : King George VI
  - Residents-Commissioner :
    - Sydney Noel King (until unknown date)
    - Arthur Vincent Aston (from unknown date)
- Malacca :
  - Monarchs : King George VI
  - Residents-Commissioner : John Falconer
- (Negeri Sembilan) Negri Sembilan :
  - Yang di-Pertuan Besar of Negri Sembilan : Tuanku Abdul Rahman ibni Almarhum Tuanku Muhammad
  - Menteri Besar Negri Sembilan : Abdul Malek Yusuf (from 1 February)
- Pahang :
  - Sultan of Pahang : Sultan Abu Bakar
  - Menteri Besar of Pahang : Mahmud Mat (from 1 February)
- Perak :
  - British Adviser of Perak :
    - Arthur Vincent Aston (until unknown date)
    - James Innes Miller (from unknown date)
  - Sultan of Perak :
    - Sultan Abdul Aziz Al-Mutasim Billah Shah Ibni Almarhum Raja Muda Musa I (until 27 March)
    - Sultan Yussuf Izzuddin Shah (from 27 March)
  - Menteri Besar of Perak : Abdul Wahab Toh Muda Abdul Aziz (from 1 February)

== Events ==
- Early 1948 – The British government banned Angkatan Wanita Sedar (AWAS), together with several other political parties like PKMM and Hisbul Muslimin, accusing them of having connections to the Malayan Communist Party.
- 1 February – The Federation of Malaya was established, replacing the Malayan Union.
- 18 February – Keeper of the Rulers' Seal was established.
- 16 June – Three European estate managers were murdered at Sg. Siput, Perak, which led to the events on 19 June.
- 19 June – A state of emergency was declared in Malaya following Communist rebellions.
- 16 July – Leading Communist Party of Malaya (CPM) member Lau Yew was killed.
- 1 August – General Operations Force was founded as Jungle Squad.
- 6 October – Sir Henry Gurney was appointed High Commissioner of Malaya.
- 12 December – 25 civilians were killed by British soldiers at Batang Kali, Selangor.
- December – Kachau Village in Selangor was torched by the British to smoke out Communist guerillas.
- Unknown date – The Federal Legislative Council (Malaya) was established as the legislative body of the Federation of Malaya (predecessor of the Malaysian Parliament).
- Unknown date – The Malayan National Liberation Army was founded (dissolved in 1989).
- Unknown date – The Malaysian Red Crescent was founded as branches of the British Red Cross Society.
- Unknown date – The Melaka Warrior Monument was completed and unveiled.
- Unknown date – The Sedition Act 1948 was enacted.
- Unknown date – The Interpretation Acts 1948 was enacted.
- Unknown date – Federated Malay States Railways (FMSR) was dissolved and replaced by Malayan Railways.
- Unknown date – All-Malaya Council of Joint Action (AMCJA) was dissolved.

== Births ==
- 14 January – Tuanku Muhriz ibni Almarhum Tuanku Munawir, 11th Yang di-Pertuan Besar Negeri Sembilan
- 17 January – Tajuddin Abdul Rahman, politician
- 1 February – Mohd Effendi Norwawi, politician
- 29 February – Khalid Salleh, actor (d. 2018)
- 23 June – Zakri Abdul Hamid, scientist and academician
- 25 July – Rafeah Buang, singer (d. 2002)
- 28 August – Shaharuddin Abdullah, footballer
- 19 December – Norlia Ghani, actress

== Deaths ==
- 26 March – Abdul Aziz al-Mu'tasim Billah Shah of Perak, 31st Sultan of Perak (b. 1887)
- 12 June – Sybil Kathigasu, Eurasian nurse (b. 1899)
- 4 July – Edward Gent, 1st British High Commissioner for Malaya (b. 1895)
- 16 July – Lau Yew, Commander-in-chief of the Malayan People's Anti Japanese Army and prominent member of the Malayan Communist Party (b. 1915)
- 15 November – Cheah Cheang Lim, businessman and miner (b. 1875)

== See also ==
- 1948
- 1947 in Malaya | 1949 in Malaya
- History of Malaysia
