= 1949 in Malaya =

- Decades: 1930s; 1940s; 1950s; 1960s
- See also: Other events of 1949; History of Malaysia • Timeline • Years

This article lists important figures and events in Malayan public affairs during the year 1949, together with births and deaths of significant Malayans.

== Incumbent political figures ==
=== Central level ===
- Governor of Malaya :
  - Henry Gurney
- Chief Minister of Malaya :
  - Tunku Abdul Rahman Putra

=== State level ===
- Perlis :
  - Raja of Perlis : Syed Harun Putra Jamalullail
  - Menteri Besar of Perlis : Raja Ahmad Raja Endut
- Johore :
  - Sultan of Johor : Sultan Ibrahim Al-Masyhur
  - Menteri Besar of Johore : Onn Jaafar
- Kedah
  - Sultan of Kedah : Sultan Badlishah
  - Menteri Besar of Kedah : Mohamad Sheriff Osman
- Kelantan :
  - Sultan of Kelantan : Sultan Ibrahim
  - Menteri Besar of Kelantan : Nik Ahmad Kamil Nik Mahmud
- (Terengganu) Trengganu :
  - Sultan of Trengganu : Sultan Ismail Nasiruddin Shah
  - Menteri Besar of Trengganu :
    - Tengku Mohamad Sultan Ahmad (until 26 December)
    - Raja Kamaruddin Idris (from 26 December)
- Selangor :
  - Sultan of Selangor : Sultan Sir Hishamuddin Alam Shah Al-Haj
  - Menteri Besar of Selangor :
    - Hamzah Abdullah (until 1 July)
    - Raja Uda Raja Muhammad (from 1 July)
- Penang :
  - Monarchs : King George VI
  - Residents-Commissioner : Arthur Vincent Aston
- Malacca :
  - Monarchs : King George VI
  - Residents-Commissioner :
- (Negeri Sembilan) Negri Sembilan :
  - Yang di-Pertuan Besar of Negri Sembilan : Tuanku Abdul Rahman ibni Almarhum Tuanku Muhammad
  - Menteri Besar Negri Sembilan : Abdul Malek Yusuf
- Pahang :
  - Sultan of Pahang : Sultan Abu Bakar
  - Menteri Besar of Pahang : Mahmud Mat
- Perak :
  - British Adviser of Perak : James Innes Miller
  - Sultan of Perak : Sultan Yusuf Izzuddin Shah
  - Menteri Besar of Perak : Abdul Wahab Toh Muda Abdul Aziz

== Events ==
- January – The Communities Liaison Committee (CLC) was established.
- 27 February – The Malayan Chinese Association (MCA) was founded.
- 4 May – The Pan-Malayan Federation of Trade Union (PMFTU) former president, A. Ganapathy, 23, was executed.
- 8 October – The establishment of University of Malaya from the merger of King Edward VII College of Medicine and Raffles College in Selangor.
- 4 November – A Malay named Ismail bin Awang killed seven people and wounded at least four others in Sungai Dua, Penang.
- The Malayan Emergency, which had begun in 1948, intensified. The communist guerrilla movement changed its name to the Malayan National Liberation Army.

== Births ==
- 19 February – Osu Sukam – Politician and former Chief Minister of Sabah
- 1 March – G. Palanivel – Politician
- 21 July – Tengku Azlan, politician
- 24 August – Mohd Ali Rustam – Politician and former Chief Minister of Malacca
- 26 August – Koh Tsu Koon – Politician and former Chief Minister of Penang
- 8 September – Ng Lam Hua – Politician (died 2013)
- 2 November – A. R. Badul – Actor and comedian
- 11 November – Sultan Ismail Petra – 28th Sultan of Kelantan (died 2019)
- 14 November – Mohd Isa bin Hj. Abdul Samad – Politician and FELDA chairman

== Deaths ==
- 4 May – Ganapathy – Pan-Malayan Federation of Trade Union (PMFTU) president

== See also ==
- 1949
- 1948 in Malaya | 1950 in Malaya
- History of Malaysia
