= Heah Joo Seang =

Malaysian politician (1899–1962)

Heah Joo Seang JMN
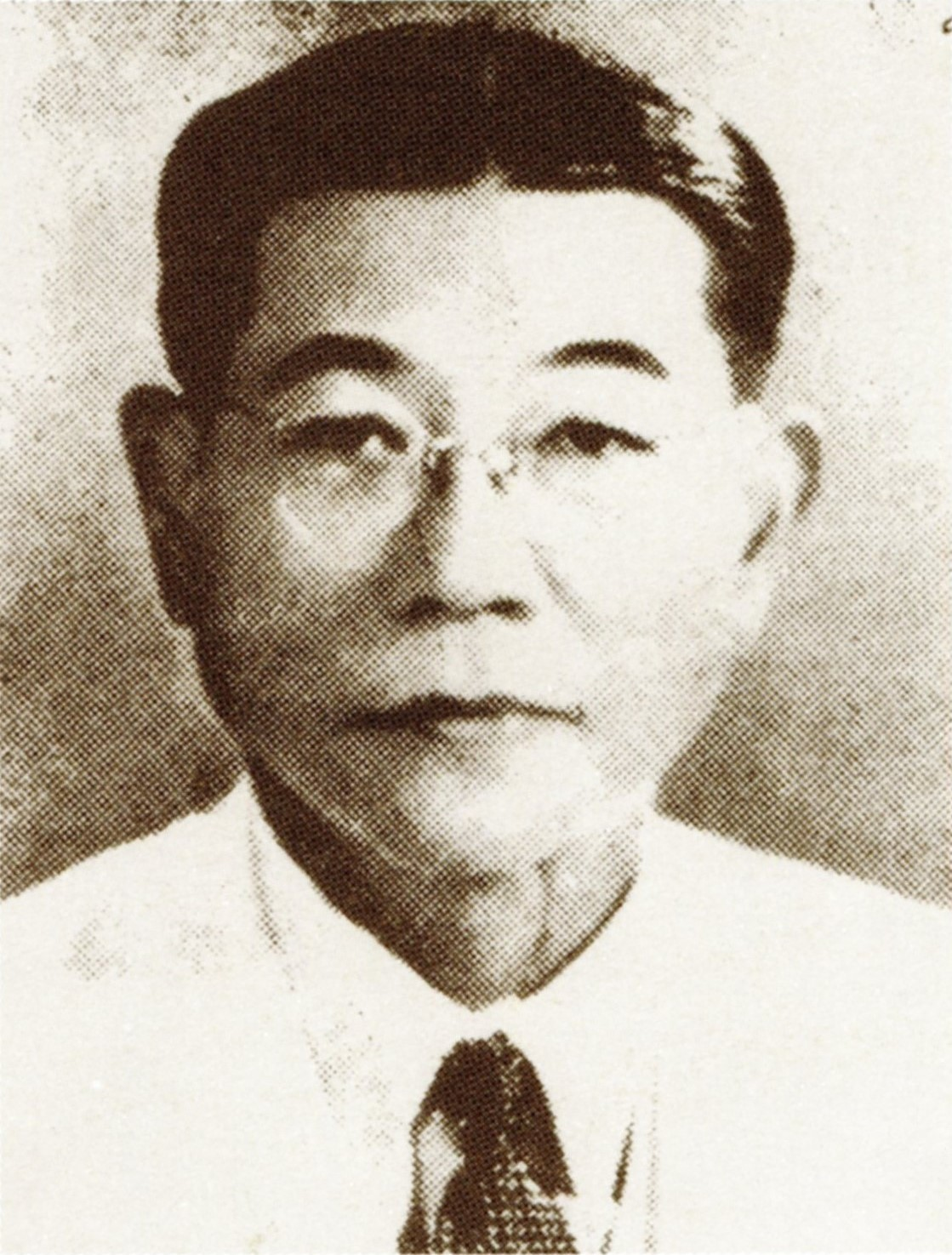
- Born: November 2, 1899; Province Wellesley, Penang, Straits Settlements
- Died: May 14, 1962 (aged 62); London, United Kingdom
- Occupations: Politician, Businessman
- Known for: Rubber magnate
- Children: 10

Heah Joo Seang (simplified Chinese: 连裕祥; traditional Chinese: 連裕祥; pinyin: Lián Yùxiáng; Pe̍h-ōe-jī: Liân Jū-siông) was a Malayan politician, business leader, rubber magnate, philanthropist and especially a supporter of education. Malaysia, as it has since become, only existed after Joo Seang's death. His contributions span three distinct periods in the country's history: the British Malaya period, the Malayan Union period, and the Federation of Malaya period.

== Personal life ==
The son of Heah Ah-Kia (or Heah Ah Kiah), Joo Seang was born in Sungei Nibong Kechil, a small village in Province Wellesley, Penang on 2 November 1899.

Heah Joo Seang began his education at a Chinese school in his hometown. Later on, he was sent to live in Georgetown, Penang. His uncle, Heah Lye Hiang, registered him to study in St. Xavier's Institution, a Christian missionary school, founded in 1852. He sat for, and passed the Cambridge School Certificate when he was only fourteen years old. Later on in life, when Joo Seang became successful in business, and gain prominence in politics, SXI (as the school is popularly known to the local people) benefited from his generosity. His legacy and association with the school was forever engraved in its history, when the school auditorium (fully funded by him) was named after him. For him to have contributed so willingly, he must have felt a deep sense of gratitude towards his alma mater.

His working life began as a clerk in his uncle Heah Lye Hiang's tapioca mill, earning $40 a month.

=== Death ===
Over the span of 15 years he had led three political parties – the Independence of Malaya Party, Party Negara and the Penang MCA as well as serving as national treasurer for the parent body. His last public appearance was during the official visit of MCA national President, Tan Siew-Sin, in March. Although he had lost his voice – he had already been ill when he travelled through Borneo on party business in February – he insisted on addressing the Alliance rally in Siew-Sin's honour. Soon after he flew to England for a throat operation. He died in Brompton Hospital on 14 May. He died in London on 14 May 1962, leaving behind a wife, Lim Soh-Liang (or Lim Su-Lian), eight sons (Heah Hock-Khoon, Heah Hock-Soon, Heah Hock-Lye, Heah Hock-Meng, Heah Hock-Thye, Heah Hock-Aun, Heah Hock-Hin, Heah Hock-Heng), three daughters (Beng-Hong, Phee-Hong, Kwee-Hong), one son-in-law, six daughters-in-law and 15 grandchildren to mourn his loss. Unknown to many, Joo Seang has a second wife. Her name is Eu Phooi Chen. It was quite common at that time for wealthy men (especially among ethnic Chinese) to have more than one wife. It was during the period of the Japanese occupation of Malaya when Phooi Chen had borne him two sons namely Paul Heah Hock Teik (born 1942) and Jeffrey Heah Hock Hai (born 1944).

About a thousand people gathered at the Penang Bayan Lepas airport to receive his body which was flown back from London.

His family had decided to follow the old custom concerning death that happens outside of a person's home – when a person dies outside of his home, he cannot be brought back into the house. Accordingly, when he was welcomed at the airport, they did so as if he were still alive. There was no weeping and no black clothes or other signs of mourning until his body was back at his mansion, "Goodwood," in Macalister Road, and his death then announced by a representative of the family. His body was borne in a coffin draped in red and was accompanied by a motorcade nearly five (5) miles long. The announcement of his death was made by Rev. Soo Hneah Hee Seong, a "kee-tong" (medium), after which the mourning officially began. his body lay in state until Sunday, 21 May 1962 where it was removed for burial at the Kwangtung and Tengchow Cemetery at Mount Erskine.

Malayan Chinese Association (MCA) national President, Tan Siew Sin said, the death of Heah Joo Seang left a gap that would be difficult to fill. "He was a tower of strength nor only to the MCA's central working committee but also the Penang organisation," the President wrote in a letter to Joo Seang's eldest son, Heah Hock-Khoon. "He infused new life into the Penang MCA and their loss is indeed a very grievous one... ...Apart from the MCA, the country will always remember him for his munificent gifts to charities and deserving institutions... ...I think it is only right that I should put these sentiments on record."

La Sallian Brother Visitor T. Michael said the Christian Brothers had reason to grieve over the loss of a "great old boy and a very generous benefactor." He said that Joo Seang was unsparing in his attachment to his old school and worked towards its progress and improvement with genuine affection and loyalty. In referring to two new schools completed at Jalan Brother James and Kampong Bharu, he said, "These schools will stand as monuments to a public-spirited citizen whose departure leaves a gap which it will be very difficult to fill."

Reporting on his funeral, the Straits Times noted, "Crowds swelling to well over 50,000 lined an eight-mile route today for the funeral of the late Mr. Heah Joo Seang, millionaire rubber magnate and Penang MCA President, whose body was flown home last week from London where he died on May 14. The two-mile procession in which 15 associations and 12 schools took part, was the longest seen in Penang for many years. 5,000 people. Three Cabinet Ministers together with the Governor of Penang, Raja Tun Uda Al-Haj, and the Deputy Chief Minister, Inche Aziz Ibrahim, were among the 5,000 people who followed the hearse on its last journey. Early arrivals were Tun Leong Yew Koh, Minister of Justice, Mr. Tan Siew Sin, Minister of Finance and National President of the MCA, Dato Ong Yoke Lin, Minister of Health and Social Welfare, and Mr. Cheah Theam Swee, Assistant Minister of Commerce and Industry. The Prime Minister, Tengku Abdul Rahman, the Deputy Prime Minister, Tun Abdul Razak, and the Governor, Raja Tun Uda Al-Haj, were among those who sent wreaths. Crowds started to gather from an early hour. Before the procession lined up, the coffin was taken out of the Heah mansion, Goodwood, in Macalister Road, and laid on the lawn where representatives of various schools and organisations paid their last respects to the late Mr. Heah. Mr. Yeo Hui Tung, a leader of the Teochew community, then read out a eulogy. Although timed to start at 11.30 a.m., the procession could not get moving until 12.15 p.m. Led by Senator Cheah Seng Khim and other members of the funeral committee, it proceeded along Macalister Road to the Church of Seven Sorrows where the first stage of the procession broke up. 'Last look.' It re-assembled later in front of the Teochew Association at Chulia Street and made its way to Beach Street to give the late Mr. Heah a "last look" at his office, Hock Lye Co., Ltd. The hearse, followed by 200 cars, then proceeded to Mount Erskine Cemetery where the burial took place at 5. p.m. after full Buddhist rites. Three school bands—St. Xavier's corps of drums and the Han Chiang and Jit Sin High School bands—marched with the procession. Among the 15 political parties, local guilds and associations which took part were UMNO and MCA youths, MCA women, UMNO and MIC members, the Teochew Hoay Kuan, the Kwangtung and Tengchow Associations, the Chinese Chamber of Commerce and the Penang Rubber Trade Association. Flags of various clubs and associations with which the late Mr. Heah was actively connected flew their flags at half-mast today."

A Heah Joo Seang Scholarship Fund was set up in his memory, his family contributing $10,000 to get the fund going.

== Career ==
He was Managing Partner of Hin Giap, the largest rubber exporter in Penang, and one of the biggest employers of labour of Malaya in 1931; Chairman of Amalgamated Amusements (1932–1937); Chairman of Lam Seng Cheong (Ipoh); Chairman of Synn Cheong and Company (Taiping); Director of Khiam Seng Trading Company (Ipoh); Director of Kim Hin Company; and owner of Heah Joo Seang Rubber Estates. He was also the Proprietor of the Wembley Dance Hall, Penang.

Following a notice in the Straits Times in August, Joo-Seang had bought from the Federation's Custodian of Property, about 26,000 acres of rubber estate land in Johore, at $6,000,000, by the start of October 1951. The transaction was the biggest of its kind up to that time involved property in the Kota Tinggi area and included Pengerang (4,632 acres), Senti (7,711), Belungkor (813), Telok Sengat (8,173), Sungei Ambok (843), Nanyo (3,089), Asahi (1,079), Sungei Seluyut (574), Tanjong Buai (132), and Buntu (425). This, on top of everything else he had done, pushed him to the forefront of the rubber business. He also actively led the industry to resolve issues. In February 1951 he convened and presided over a meeting of Penang merchants, both European and Asian, at the Penang Rubber Exchange to address the breakdown in discussions between the Penang Employers' Association and the owners of local lighters, the latter of whom were demanding a 25 percent increase in rates. The breakdown between the parties had negatively affected the trade of Penang. The matter, now being brought back to the table was resolved, and trading resumed.

He advocated finding new uses for natural rubber including laying rubber roads and rubber flooring in offices.

At a dinner hosted by the Penang Rubber Trade Association on 18 March 1961 to celebrate his Johan Mangku Negara award from the King, Joo Seang, then still the President of the association, said he would still be engaged in the rubber trade if he had to live his life over. "It is a fascinating game in which one has to pit one's brains against the world." He had been connected to the organisation for a long time, having first served that body as Honorary Secretary, forty (40) years earlier.

=== Public roles ===
Who's Who in Malaya 1939: A Biographical Record of Prominent Members of Malaya's Community in Official, Professional and Commercial Circles, Singapore: Fishers Ltd (1939) provides a summary of the varied roles that Joo Seang played in Malaya:

- Member Chinese Advisory Board, Penang (1931)
- Municipal Commissioner, Georgetown (1931–1932)
- Editor and Proprietor of the Malayan Chinese Review (1931–1933)

He was also

- Vice-President and later President of the Old Xaverians' Association
- Honorary Secretary, Penang Chinese Unemployed Relief Fund, 1930
- President, Penang Rubber Exchange, (he was Vice-President in 1936)
- President, Overseas Chinese Association (1940s)
- President of the Straits Chinese British Association (SCBA), Penang
- Chairman of the Penang People's Education Association
- Justice of the Peace
- President Hu Yew Seah
- President All Blues Club
- Chairman, Phor Tay Institution
- Member of the Federation Industrial Court
- Member of the Rubber Study Group Committee
- Member of the Malayan Rubber Export Registration Board
- President, Penang Chinese Swimming Club, 1953
- Head of the special committee to investigate the possibility of opening a school for the deaf in the Federation
- Chairman, St. Xavier's Building Fund, 1953
- Chairman, United Nations Association of Malaya, 1954
- Federal Councillor, 1954–1955
- President of the Penang Party Negara, 1954
- Member of the committee appointed by the S.C.B.A. to seek clarification on the status of the "Queen's Chinese" in a new and independent Malaya, 1956 – the other members being Koh Sin Hock, Khoo Eng Cheang, Ong Joo Sun and Cheah Phee Aik.
- President of the Badminton Association of Malaya (1952–1959) and Vice-President of and Malayan Representative to the Asian Badminton Confederation, 1959
- Chairman of the Penang National Mosque Fund Committee, 1959
- Chairman of the St. Xavier's Institution Building Fund Committee, 1961
- President of the Penang Branch of the Malayan Chinese Association (MCA), 1961

He was also President, Li Tek Siah; President, Chinese Benevolent Association; President, Rubber Trade Association; President, Federation of Malaya Rubber Trade Association, Member of the Board of Managers of St. Xavier's Institution, Chairman, Han Chiang School and bore office among very many other organisations.

=== The Reid Commission ===
In August 1956, Heah Joo Seang hosted a dinner at his residence (the Goodwood mansion) in MacAlister road, Georgetown, Penang, in honour of the visit of Lord William Reid. Lord Reid was the Chairman of the Commission which was set up in England for the purpose of drafting and defining the Constitution of the Federation of Malaya. During his dinner speech, Lord Reid said, "We intend to do our utmost to leave some trace of your devotion to this Country in the shape of the Constitution", in reference to Joo Seang's championing of the rights of the straits born Chinese.

The drafting of the Constitution of the Federation of Malaya began the process toward the establishment of a new Government, after England agreed to concede independence to Malaya. The Commission was set up in March 1956 to seek "the views of political parties, non-government organization and individuals on the form of government and racial structure appropriate to this Country".

=== Onn Jaafar supporter ===
Joo Seang was a strong supporter of Malayan politician Sir Onn Jaafar, founder of the United Malays National Organisation and Chief Minister of Johore. When the latter was facing political attacks, shortly after the Onn retired as Member for Home Affairs and Chairman of the Rural and Industrial Development Authority, Joo Seang, said in his defence, "Sir Onn has been falsely accused of being anti-Chinese. He has been severely criticised by some so-called Malay leaders who only want to gratify their own selfish ends."

== Honours ==
=== Philanthropy ===
Joo Seang was passionate about sports and education and these, more than anything attracted his interest. While not a comprehensive list, some of his gifts included:

- $10,000 the University of Malaya Endowment Fund (Chair in Chinese), 1951
- $4,000 Singapore Badminton Hall Fund, 1951
- $10,000 Henry Gurney Memorial Fund, 1952
- £100 to the Lord Mayor of London, organiser of London's King George IV Memorial Fund.
- $1,000 Sunday Times Christmas Tree Fund, 1952
- $50,000 Penang Chinese Swimming Club Building Fund, in addition to an interest-free loan for $120,000 for the purchase of a three-acre site at Tanjong Bungah
- $25,000 to the St. Xavier's building fund in 1953.
- $2,500 Badminton Association of Malaya's Ong Poh Lim and Ooi Teik Hock UK and USA Tour Fund, 1954
- $500, St. Nicholas Home Building Fund, 1954
- $2,000 Malacca Badminton Association Debt Relief Fund, 1956
- $2,000 Penang Goodwill Committee Fund for the Victims and their Families of the George Town Disturbances
- $1,000 Penang State Appeal Committee of the federation Olympic Council's International Games Fund, 1958
- $200 Straits Times Cheer Fund, 1959
- $500 Straits Times and Berita Harian Cheer Fund for Malayan Troops in the Congo
- $1,000 Penang fund for World Refugee Week, 1961
- $1,000 Press Club of Malaya Building Fund, 1961

=== Decorations ===
In January 1961 he was awarded the Johan Mangku Negara (JMN) at the King's installation honours that year.

== Bibliography ==
- Chua, Ai-Lin (2008) 'Imperial Subjects, Straits Citizens: Anglophone Asians and the Struggle for Political Rights in Inter-War Singapore' in Paths Not Taken: Political Pluralism in Post-War Singapore, eds Michael D. Barr and Carl A. Trocki, Singapore: NUS Press.
- Historical Personalities of Penang (1986). Penang: Phoenix Press. [HPP]
- Lee Kam Hing and Chow Mun Seong (2007) Biographical Dictionary of the Chinese in Malaysia. Selangor: Pelanduk Publication. [Lee & Chow]
- Yoshihara, Kunio (1988) The rise of ersatz capitalism in South-East Asia, London: Oxford University Press
- Ong Mei Lin, Pamela (2014) Fortitude: The life and times of Heah Joo Seang, Singapore: Straits Times Press
