= Seang =

Seang is a surname. Notable people with the surname include:

- Heah Joo Seang (1899–1962), Malayan politician
- Khoo Soo Seang (born 1945), Malaysian politician
- Tan Chun Seang (born 1986), Malaysian badminton player
