= Manalong =

- Location within Borneo
- Coordinates: 1.08333°N 111.56667°E
- Country: Malaysia
- State: Sarawak
- Elevation: 112 m (367 ft)

Manalong is a settlement in Sarawak, Malaysia. It lies approximately 148.1 kilometres (92 mi) east-south-east of the state capital Kuching. Neighbouring settlements include:

- Guntong 2.6 kilometres (1.6 mi) northwest
- Sengkuang 3.7 kilometres (2.3 mi) west
- Kaong 4.1 kilometres (2.5 mi) southeast
- Sengkuang 4.1 kilometres (2.5 mi) southwest
- Tenyungan 4.1 kilometres (2.5 mi) southwest
- Kelasen 4.1 kilometres (2.5 mi) northwest
- Sebujok 5.2 kilometres (3.2 mi) southeast
