= Ugol =

- Location within Borneo
- Coordinates: 1.15°N 111.53333°E
- Country: Malaysia
- State: Sarawak
- Elevation: 192 m (630 ft)

Ugol is a settlement in Sarawak, Malaysia. It lies approximately 142 kilometres (88 mi) east-south-east of the state capital Kuching.

Neighbouring settlements include:

- Liu 1.9 kilometres (1.2 mi) west
- Sepatak 2.6 kilometres (1.6 mi) northwest
- Bayai 2.6 kilometres (1.6 mi) southwest
- Munggor 2.6 kilometres (1.6 mi) southeast
- Entawa 3.7 kilometres (2.3 mi) south
- Genting San 4.1 kilometres (2.5 mi) northwest
- Kelasen 4.1 kilometres (2.5 mi) southeast
