= 1953 Malayan local elections =

The local elections were held in the Federation of Malaya in 1953.

== Municipal election ==
=== George Town ===
Date: 5 December 1953; Electorate: 26,081; Turnout:
Wards	Elected councillor	Elected party	Votes	Majority	Opponent(s)	Party	Votes	Electorate
UMNO-Muslim League 3 (4) | Radicals 0 (4) | Labour 0 (1)
Jelutong	1. Nyak Hashim Nyak Puteh	UMNO-Muslim League	2,178	617	2. N. Patkunam; 3. Lim Chong Eu; 4. Charan Singh	Labour; Radicals; IMP	1,561; 1,186; 416	8,762
Kelawei	1. S. M. Hussain	UMNO-Muslim League	883	342	2. A. C. Reutens; 3. D. S. Ramanathan; 4. Khoo Kay Eong	Radicals; Labour; IMP	541; 406; 255	3,895
Tanjong	1. H. E. Tyebkhan	UMNO-Muslim League	3,128	1,602	2. Khoo Soo Jin; 3. Wong Loh Hun; 4. Yeoh Cheng Kung	IMP; Radicals; Labour	1,526; 1,508; 494	13,424

=== Kuala Lumpur ===
Date: 5 December 1953; Electorate: Turnout: 63%
Wards	Elected councillor	Elected party	Votes	Majority	Opponent(s)	Party	Votes	Electorate
UMNO-MCA 4 (10) | IMP 0 (1) | Independent 0 (1)
Bangsar	1. Abdul Aziz Ishak	UMNO-MCA	507	70	2. K. Gurupatham; 3. A. C. Segaram	Ind. IMP	437; 155	1,348
Imbi	1. Cheah Ewe Keat	UMNO-MCA	Unopposed					
Petaling	1. Ong Yoke Lin	UMNO-MCA	Unopposed					
Sentul	1. Yahaya Sheikh Ahmad	UMNO-MCA	873	386	2. Badrillah Abdul Karim	Ind.	487	2,517

=== Malacca ===
Date: 5 December 1953; Electorate: Turnout:
Wards	Elected councillor	Elected party	Votes	Majority	Opponent(s)	Party	Votes	Total votes	Spoilt vote	Turnout
UMNO-MCA 2 (4) | Labour 1 (2) | Progressive 0 (3)
Bukit China	1. J. L. D'Cruz	Labour	1,155	140	2. Yusoff Sulong	UMNO-MCA	1,015	2,202	32	63.8%
Fort	1. A. W. B. Acton	UMNO-MCA	Unopposed							
Tranquerah	1. Abu Bakar Abdul Rahman	UMNO-MCA	Unopposed							

== Town councils election ==
=== Alor Star ===
Date: Electorate: Turnout:
Wards	Elected councillor	Elected party
?
Kampong	1. 2.: 3. Mustafa Ismail	UMNO-MCA
Pekan	1. 2.: 3. Mak Guan Pin	UMNO-MCA
Seberang	1. 2.: 3. Ibrahim Salleh	Ind. Ind. UMNO-MCA

=== Bandar Maharani, Muar ===
Date: 5 December 1953; Electorate: 4,587; Turnout: 73.8%
Wards	Elected councillor	Elected party	Votes	Majority	Opponent(s)	Party	Votes	Total votes
UMNO-MCA 3 (?) | ?
Maharani	1. Lim Ah Sitt	UMNO-MCA	938	650	2. Ja'afar Abdul Rahman	Ind.	288	1,256
Parit Stongkat	1. Chan Shi Shi	UMNO-MCA	502	112	2. Chua Huck Yew	Ind.	390	910
Sultan Ibrahim	1. Hassan Yunus	UMNO-MCA	872	534	2. Omar Ahmad	Ind.	338	1,220

=== Bandar Penggaram, Batu Pahat ===
Date: ~~5 December 1953~~; Electorate: Turnout: nil
Wards	Elected councillor	Elected party	Votes	Majority	Opponent(s)	Party	Votes
UMNO-MCA 2 (?) | Independent 1 (?) | ?
Gunong Soga	1. Ami Muhamed Amin	UMNO-MCA	Unopposed				
Jalan Sultanah	1. Soo Sze Ying	UMNO-MCA	Unopposed				
Kampong Petani	1. Sulaiman Abdul Rahman	Ind.	Unopposed				

=== Johore Bahru ===
Date: ~~5 December 1953~~; Electorate: Turnout: nil
Wards	Elected councillor	Elected party	Votes	Majority	Opponent(s)	Party	Votes
UMNO-MCA 4 (9)
Ayer Molek	1. Wong Sze Ming	UMNO-MCA	Unopposed				
Nong Chik	1. Mansoor Bakri; 2. Abdul Rahim Kimes	UMNO-MCA; UMNO-MCA	Unopposed				
Tebrau	1. Wong Peng Long	UMNO-MCA	Unopposed				

=== Kluang ===
Date: 7 November 1953; Electorate: Turnout:
Wards	Elected councillor	Elected party	Votes	Majority	Opponent(s)	Party	Votes
UMNO-MCA 9 (9)
Gunong Lambak	1. Wee Lee Poh; 2. Teoh Chze Chong; 3. Cheong Soo Kheng	UMNO-MCA; UMNO-MCA; UMNO-MCA	419; 411; 259	8	S. M. Pillay; Tan Kim Seck	Ind. Ind.	
Mengkibol	1. Alwi Jawal; 2. Lim Chin Khean; 3. Cheah Chin Khean	UMNO-MCA; UMNO-MCA; UMNO-MCA	345; 337; 332	8	Foo See Juan; Woo See Tiam	Ind. Ind.	
Mesjid Lama	1. Teh Wan Boon; 2. Md. Zain Mohammed; 3. Md. Salim Ahmad	UMNO-MCA; UMNO-MCA; UMNO-MCA	456; 385; 296	71	S. M. Pillay; Tan Kim Seck	Ind. Ind.	

=== Kota Bharu ===
Date: 4 July 1953; Electorate: Turnout: 78%
Wards	Elected councillor	Elected party	Votes	Majority	Opponent(s)	Party	Votes
?
Kubang Pasu	1. 2. 3.	Ind. Ind. Chamber-Gabongan			Che Mohamad Daud Salleh; Nik Yahya Nik Daud; Mohamad Abu Bakar Saman; Nik Ja'afar Nik Hassan; Nik Mahmood Abdul Majid; Nik Mohamed Abdul Rahman; Nik Mohamad Nik Mahmood; Wan Ibrahim Wan Mustapha; Wan Sulaiman Ibrahim		
Kota Lama	1. 2. 3.	Chamber-Gabongan; Chamber-Gabongan; Chamber-Gabongan			A. Nachiappan; Che Jaafar Ahmad; Che Jaafar Yusoff; Che Mohamed Noor Yusof; Ismail Omar; Ibrahim Isa; Mohamed Noordin Che Embi; Ng Yew Seng; Nik Hassan Nik Yahya; Wan Daud; Wee Jit Seng; Wong Yew Wye		
Wakaf Siku	1. 2. 3.	Chamber-Gabongan; Chamber-Gabongan; Ind.			Abu Bakar Mohamad; Ibrahim Omar; Hamid Ya'acob; Mary Kam; Nik Ahmad Mahmood; Nik Amin Ali; Quah Eng Chuan; Tengku Ismail		

=== Kuala Trengganu ===
Date: 22 February 1953; Electorate: Turnout:
Wards	Elected councillor	Elected party	Votes	Majority	Opponent(s)	Party	Votes
?
Bukit Besar	1. Muda Abdullah; 2.; 3.						
Kuala	1. Gan Chong Bin; 2.; 3.				Syed Alwee Ahmad Alkaff; Che Long Abas; Mohamed Othman; P. C. Isaacs		
Ladang	1. Mohamed Chik; 2.; 3.				Abdul Rashid Hussein; Che Puteh Arshad; Tan Cheng Soon		

=== Segamat ===
Date: 7 November 1953; Electorate: 1,210; Turnout: 89.3%
Wards	Elected councillor	Elected party	Votes	Majority	Opponent(s)	Party	Votes	Electorate	Turnout
UMNO-MCA 9 (9)
Buloh Kasap	1. Osman Setot; 2. Elias Abu Bakar; 3. Gan Tian Soo	UMNO-MCA; UMNO-MCA; UMNO-MCA	252; 228; 218	24	4. K. Ponniah; 5. K. Osman Mohammed	Ind. Ind.	169; 143	431	91.3%
Gemereh	1. Kuan Chian Sang; 2. Pee Kang Hai; 3. Razali Abdul Manap	UMNO-MCA; UMNO-MCA; UMNO-MCA	321; 312; 233	9	4. Henry Lim Meng See	Ind.	111	506	
Genuang	1. Hassan Mohamed; 2. Chia Chin Koon; 3. Soon Boon Seng	UMNO-MCA; UMNO-MCA; UMNO-MCA	Unopposed					273	nil

=== Seremban ===
Date: 22 August 1953; Electorate: Turnout: 84.62%
Wards	Elected councillor	Elected party	Votes	Majority	Opponent(s)	Party	Votes
UMNO-MCA 10 (10) | Labour 1 (1) | Independent 1 (1)
Lake	1. Lee Tee Siong; 2. Tungku Asiah Tungku Muda Chik; 3. Wong Nang Ching	UMNO-MCA; UMNO-MCA; UMNO-MCA	485; 405; 342	80	Kat Pye Hin; Singam; Joseph Siow Loong Hin; Suppiah		
Lobak	1. S. Sathappan; 2. Han Hui Fong; 3. Jaafar Talib	Labour; UMNO-MCA; UMNO-MCA	526; 524; 443	2	I. M. K. Pillay; K. Rajah; Tham Tit Ming		
Rahang	1. Lim Ewe Law; 2. Stanley Ponniah; 3. Raja Mohamed Hanifah	UMNO-MCA; Ind. UMNO-MCA	546; 500; 379	46	Manniam; M. Vallipuram; Yusof Ibrahim		
Temiang	1. Chin See Yin; 2. Lim Kee Siong; 3. Jamaluddin Aji	UMNO-MCA; UMNO-MCA; UMNO-MCA	634; 559; 540	75	Lam Teck Choon; B. H. Tan		

=== Sungei Patani ===
Date: Electorate: Turnout:
Wards	Elected councillor	Elected party
?
Pekan Bahru	1. 2.: 3. Chin Chin Cheang	UMNO-MCA
Pekan Lama	1. 2.: 3. John Karuvilla	UMNO-MCA
Rural	1. 2.: 3. Osman Hussein	UMNO-MCA

== Local councils election ==
=== Guntong ===
Guntong local election was the second election to be held in the Kinta district. Guntong was divided into four wards with an electorate of 4,000.

=== Kota Tinggi ===
Date: 6 December 1953; Electorate: Turnout:
Wards	Elected councillor	Elected party
UMNO-MCA 7
	Mohamed Abdullah; Abdul Maji Ahmed; Hassan Deri; Omar Ahmad; Mahmood Hussein; Syed Hussein Tahir; Ahmad Hussein	UMNO-MCA; UMNO-MCA; UMNO-MCA; UMNO-MCA; UMNO-MCA; UMNO-MCA; UMNO-MCA

=== Kulai ===
Date: 3 March 1953; Electorate: Turnout:
Wards	Elected councillor	Elected party
	Foo Gee Teng; Chew Fong Choon; Hung Chin Poh; Pong Kiat Kee; K. V. Devan; Law Ah Bak; Chong Chock Len; Tan Seong Teok; Tai Ng; Hew Nai Tong; Hew Soon; Chear Kok Foo	

=== Trengganu ===
Local council elections for 17 kampongs in five mukims in Trengganu were held in January 1953. The mukims are Pantai, Chalok, Guntong, Tasek and Ulu Situ.
