= Carl A. Trocki =

Australian historian (1940–2024)

Carl A. Trocki (January 4, 1940 – May 30, 2024) was an American historian specializing in the history of Southeast Asia and China. He was formerly Professor of Asian Studies at the Queensland University of Technology and Director of the Centre for Community and Cross-Cultural Studies. He was a Fellow of the Australian Academy of the Humanities.

He held a Ph.D. in Southeast Asian history from Cornell University.

His academic publications include studies of Thailand, Singapore, Malaysia, the Chinese diaspora, and the history of the drug trade in China and South-East Asia.

== Books ==
- Prince of Pirates: The Temenggongs and the Development of Johor and Singapore, 1784–1885, University of Singapore Press, Singapore, 1979, second edition: 2007.
- Opium and Empire: Chinese Society in Colonial Singapore, 1800–1910, Cornell University Press, Ithaca, NY, 1990.
- Gangsters, Democracy and the State (Editor), Cornell Southeast Asia Program, Ithaca, New York, 1998.
- Opium, Empire and the Global Political Economy: A History of the Asian Opium Trade, 1750-1950, Routledge Ltd., London & New York, 1999, reprinted in 2005.
- Singapore: Wealth, Power and the Culture of Control, Routledge, London & New York, 2006.
- Paths Not Taken: Political Pluralism in Postwar Singapore (Editor, with Michael D. Barr), University of Hawaii Press, ISBN 997169378X, 2009
