= Munggor =

- Location within Borneo
- Coordinates: 1.13333°N 111.55°E
- Country: Malaysia
- State: Sarawak
- Elevation: 159 m (522 ft)

Munggor is a settlement in Sarawak, Malaysia. It lies approximately 144.3 kilometres (90 mi) east-south-east of the state capital Kuching.

Neighbouring settlements include:

- Kelasen 1.9 kilometres (1.2 mi) south
- Entawa 2.6 kilometres (1.6 mi) southwest
- Ugol 2.6 kilometres (1.6 mi) northwest
- Bayai 3.7 kilometres (2.3 mi) west
- Guntong 3.7 kilometres (2.3 mi) south
- Liu 4.1 kilometres (2.5 mi) northwest
