= Penang ambush =

Penang Ambush
- Part of Malayan Emergency
Date	22 January 1950
Location	Sungai Bakap, Malaya
Result	Communist victory

Belligerents
United Kingdom • RMP	MCP; MNLA

Commanders and leaders
(United Kingdom) Unknown	Lee Meng

Strength
Unknown	Unknown

Casualties and losses
8 killed 6 wounded Total: 14 casualties	1 wounded

The Penang ambush was a guerrilla action that took place during the Malayan Emergency. Communists ambushed Malayan and British police and killed eight of them, including a British police sergeant.
