= 1954 Malayan local elections =

Local elections were held in the Federation of Malaya in 1954.

== Municipal election ==
=== George Town ===
Date: 4 December 1954; Electorate: Turnout:
Wards	Elected councillor	Elected party	Votes	Majority	Opponent(s)	Party	Votes
UMNO-MCA 3 (7) | Radicals 0 (1) | Labour 0 (1)
Jelutong	1. Abdullah Ariff	UMNO-MCA			2. N. Patkunam	Labour	
Kelawei	1. G. H. Goh	UMNO-MCA					
Tanjong	1. S. M. Mohd. Idris	UMNO-MCA			2. M. A. Abdul Wahab	Negara	

=== Kuala Lumpur ===
Date: 4 December 1954; Electorate: Turnout:
Wards	Elected councillor	Elected party	Votes	Majority	Opponent(s)	Party	Votes
UMNO-MCA-MIC 4 (11) | IMP 0 (1)
Bangsar	1. K. Gurupatham	UMNO-MCA-MIC	1,231	480	2. S. C. E. Singam; 3. T. R. P. Dawson	Ind. Ind.	751; 66
Imbi	1. Chan Chee Hong	UMNO-MCA-MIC	Unopposed				
Petaling	1. Gunn Chit Wha	UMNO-MCA-MIC	772		2. Lawrence Huang	Labour	
Sentul	1. Abdullah Yassin	UMNO-MCA-MIC	Unopposed				

=== Malacca ===
Date: 4 December 1954; Electorate: Turnout:
Wards	Elected councillor	Elected party	Votes	Majority	Opponent(s)	Party	Votes
UMNO-MCA 3 (7) | Labour 0 (2)
Bukit China	1. Yusoff Sulong	UMNO-MCA			2. N. M. Ghouse		
Fort	1.	UMNO-MCA					
Tranquerah	1.	UMNO-MCA			Lim Soo Siew; Yap Eng Tee		

== Town councils election ==
=== Alor Star ===
Date: ~~7 August 1954~~; Electorate: Turnout: nil
Wards	Elected councillor	Elected party	Votes	Majority	Opponent(s)	Party	Votes
UMNO-MCA 3 (?) | ?
Kampong	1. Mustafa Ismail	UMNO-MCA	Unopposed				
Pekan	1. Mak Guan Pin	UMNO-MCA	Unopposed				
Seberang	1. Ibrahim Salleh	UMNO-MCA	Unopposed				

=== Bandar Maharani, Muar ===
Date: ~~4 December 1954~~; Electorate: Turnout: nil
Wards	Elected councillor	Elected party	Votes	Majority	Opponent(s)	Party	Votes
UMNO-MCA 3 (?)
Maharani	1. Wong Tai Lam	UMNO-MCA	Unopposed				
Parit Stongkat	1. Abdul Latiff Omar	UMNO-MCA	Unopposed				
Sultan Ibrahim	1. Alwi Abdullah	UMNO-MCA	Unopposed				

=== Bandar Penggaram, Batu Pahat ===
Date: 4 December 1954; Electorate: Turnout:
Wards	Elected councillor	Elected party
?
Gunong Saga	1.	
Jalan Sultanah	1.	
Kampong Petani	1.	

=== Bukit Mertajam ===
Date: 4 December 1954; Electorate: Turnout:
Wards	Elected councillor	Elected party	Votes	Majority	Opponent(s)	Party	Votes
Radicals 1 (?) | Independent 1 (?)
	1. Tan Cheng Bee	Radicals					
	1. Ooh Chooi Cheng	Ind.					

=== Butterworth ===
Date: 4 December 1954; Electorate: Turnout:
Wards	Elected councillor	Elected party	Votes	Majority	Opponent(s)	Party	Votes
Labour 2 (?)
Northern	1. B. H. Oon	Labour			2. Che Mariam Harun	UMNO-MCA	
	1.	Labour					

=== Ipoh-Menglembu ===
Date: 15 August 1954; Electorate: Turnout:
Wards	Elected councillor	Elected party	Votes	Majority	Opponent(s)	Party	Votes
UMNO-MCA-Progressive 12 (12)
Green Town	1. 2. 3.	UMNO-MCA-Progressive; UMNO-MCA-Progressive; UMNO-MCA-Progressive			Chin Swee Onn; Goh Siew Hock; Lean Chor Kow; D. R. Seenivasagam; Y. C. Kang; C. H. Yin		
Menglembu	1. 2. 3.	UMNO-MCA-Progressive; UMNO-MCA-Progressive; UMNO-MCA-Progressive			Chong Hong Chew; Haroun Mohd. Mina; Lee Koon Voon; Mat Aji Jamin; Yap Yin Fah; Yim Kwong Chee		
Pasir Puteh	1. 2. 3.	UMNO-MCA-Progressive; UMNO-MCA-Progressive; UMNO-MCA-Progressive			Chong Wai Weng; Ismail Abdul Majid; Kok Yoon San; Laily Mariam Sulaiman; Mohamed Ali Pitchay; Mohamed Basir Mohd Sharif		
Silibin	1. 2. 3.	UMNO-MCA-Progressive; UMNO-MCA-Progressive; UMNO-MCA-Progressive			Ahmad Sham Yunus; Foo Foon Chin; Hazara Singh; Subramaniam Nalliah; Too Joon Hing; Woo Ka Lim; C. M. Yusuf		

=== Johore Bahru ===
Date: ~~4 December 1954~~; Electorate: Turnout: nil
Wards	Elected councillor	Elected party	Votes	Majority	Opponent(s)	Party	Votes
UMNO-MCA 3 (9)
Ayer Molek	1. Ahmad Mohamed Shah	UMNO-MCA	Unopposed				
Nong Chik	1. Uda Awang	UMNO-MCA	Unopposed				
Tebrau	1. Syed Abdul Rahman Ahmad	UMNO-MCA	Unopposed				

=== Klang ===
Date: 4 December 1954; Electorate: Turnout:
Wards	Elected councillor	Elected party	Votes	Majority	Opponent(s)	Party	Votes
UMNO-MCA 9 (9)
Klang North	1. 2. 3.	UMNO-MCA; UMNO-MCA; UMNO-MCA					
Klang South	1. 2. 3.	UMNO-MCA; UMNO-MCA; UMNO-MCA			Cheong Jin Hoe; Lee Eng Teh; Mohamed Yamin Abdul Kadir; Raja Ibrahim Raja Abdul Jalil; A. Sivanathan		
Port Swettenham	1. 2. 3.	UMNO-MCA; UMNO-MCA; UMNO-MCA			Mohd. Salleh Hussain; Muhammed Darus K. Ahmad; Ng Soon Huat; Shamsudin Hamid		

=== Kluang ===
Date: 4 December 1954; Electorate: Turnout:
Wards	Elected councillor	Elected party
?
Gunong Lambak	1.	
Mengkibol	1.	
Mesjid Lama	1.	

=== Kota Bharu ===
Date: 3 July 1954; Electorate: 5,847; Turnout: 24.11%
Wards	Elected councillor	Elected party
?
Kubang Pasu	1. Mohd. Abu Bakar Saman	
Kota Lama	1. Ibrahim Isa	
Wakaf Siku	1. Abu Bakar Mohammed	

=== Kuala Trengganu ===
Date: Electorate: Turnout:
Wards	Elected councillor	Elected party
?
Bukit Besar	1.	
Kuala	1.	
Ladang	1. Abdul Rashid Hussein	UMNO

=== Kuantan ===
Date: 21 July 1954; Electorate: Turnout:
Wards	Elected councillor	Elected party	Votes	Majority	Opponent(s)	Party	Votes
UMNO-MCA 9 (9)
Central Town	1. 2. 3.	UMNO-MCA; UMNO-MCA; UMNO-MCA			4.	Ind.	
Tanah Puteh	1. Wan Abdul Aziz Ungku Abdullah; 2. Yap Kheng Van; 3. Aziz Ahmad	UMNO-MCA; UMNO-MCA; UMNO-MCA	Unopposed				
Telok Sisek	1. Wong Kuan Tan; 2. Ibrahim Daud; 3. Mansur Othman	UMNO-MCA; UMNO-MCA; UMNO-MCA	Unopposed				

=== Pasir Mas ===
Date: 3 April 1954; Electorate: 2,312; Turnout: 84.3%
Wards	Elected councillor	Elected party
?
Lemal	1. Abdul Rahman Osman; 2. Yacob Awang; 3. Abdullah Ibrahim	
Kampong Bahru	1. Abdul Rahman Daud; 2. Ariffin Sinavarusai; 3. Abdullah Awang Bahru	
Pengkalan Pasir	1. Hassan Ismail; 2. Mohamed Harun; 3. Che Muda	

=== Segamat ===
Date: 6 November 1954; Electorate: Turnout:
Wards	Elected councillor	Elected party	Votes	Majority	Opponent(s)	Party	Votes
?
Buloh Kasap	1.				Razali A. Manap; Jaafar A. Hamid		
Gemereh	1.				Henry Lim Meng See; Soon Boon Seng		
Genuang	1.						

=== Seremban ===
Date: 4 December 1954; Electorate: Turnout:
Wards	Elected councillor	Elected party	Votes	Majority	Opponent(s)	Party	Votes
Labour 3 (4) | UMNO-MCA 1 (7) | Independent 0 (1)
Lake	1. Wong Nang Ching	UMNO-MCA			2. Joseph Siow	Negara	
Lobak	1. Kat Fye Hin	Labour					
Rahang	1. Robert Singam	Labour	600	202	2. Raja Mohamed Hanifah	UMNO-MCA	398
Temiang	1. Lam Teck Choon	Labour					

=== Sungei Patani ===
Date: ~~14 August 1954~~; Electorate: Turnout: nil
Wards	Elected councillor	Elected party	Votes	Majority	Opponent(s)	Party	Votes
UMNO-MCA 3 (?)
Pekan Bahru	1. Chin Chin Cheang	UMNO-MCA	Unopposed				
Pekan Lama	1. Mohd. Babjee	UMNO-MCA	Unopposed				
Rural	1. Osman Hussein	UMNO-MCA	Unopposed				

=== Taiping ===
Date: 15 August 1954; Electorate: Turnout:
Wards	Elected councillor	Elected party
UMNO-MCA-Progressive 9 (9)
Assam Kumbang	1. 2. 3.	UMNO-MCA-Progressive; UMNO-MCA-Progressive; UMNO-MCA-Progressive
Klian Pau	1. 2. 3.	UMNO-MCA-Progressive; UMNO-MCA-Progressive; UMNO-MCA-Progressive
Kota	1. 2. 3.	UMNO-MCA-Progressive; UMNO-MCA-Progressive; UMNO-MCA-Progressive

=== Teluk Anson ===
Date: 15 August 1954; Electorate: 3,814; Turnout:
Wards	Elected councillor	Elected party	Electorate
UMNO-MCA-Progressive 9 (9)
Changkat Jong	1. 2. 3.	UMNO-MCA-Progressive; UMNO-MCA-Progressive; UMNO-MCA-Progressive	1,573
Denison Road	1. 2. 3.	UMNO-MCA-Progressive; UMNO-MCA-Progressive; UMNO-MCA-Progressive	1,063
Pasir Bedamar	1. 2. 3.	UMNO-MCA-Progressive; UMNO-MCA-Progressive; UMNO-MCA-Progressive	1,178
