= Common Gaming Houses Act 1953 =

Malaysian law pertaining to gambling

Parliament of Malaysia
- Long title: An Act relating to the suppression of common gaming houses, public gaming, and public lotteries.
- Citation: Act 289
- Territorial extent: Throughout Malaysia
- Enacted: 1953 (F.M. Ordinance No. 26 of 1953); Revised: 1983 (Act 289 w.e.f. 18 August 1983)
- Effective: [Peninsular Malaysia—25 June 1953; Sabah and Sarawak—15 April 1992, P.U. (B) 164/1992; Federal Territory of Labuan—15 April 1992, P.U. (B) 165/1992]

Amended by
- The Settlements Nominated Council (Change of Title) Ordinance 1956 [F.M. Ord. 60/1956] Federal Constitution (Modification of Laws) (Ordinances and Proclamations) Order 1958 [L.N. 332/1958] Common Gaming Houses (Amendment) Act 1959 [Act 9/1959] Racing Club (Public Sweepstakes) Act 1965 [Act 44/1965] Common Gaming Houses (Amendment) Act 1966 [Act 29/1966] Racing Club (Public Sweepstakes) (Amendment) Act 1967 [Act 17/1967] Common Gaming Houses (Amendment) Act 1971 [Act A56] Federal Territory (Modification of Common Gaming Houses Ordinance 1953) Order 1977 [P.U. (A) 113/1977] Malaysian Currency (Ringgit) Act 1975 [Act 160] Common Gaming Houses (Amendment) Act 1984 [Act A577] Common Gaming Houses (Amendment) Act 1990 [Act A755] Common Gaming Houses (Amendment) Act 2001 [Act A1096]

Related legislation
- Common Gaming Houses Ordinance [S.S. Cap 30] Common Gaming Houses Enactment [F.M.S. Cap. 47] Common Gaming Houses Enactment [Johore Enactment No. 37] Enactment No. 21 (Common Gaming Houses) [Kedah Enactment No. 2 of 1337] Common Gaming Houses Enactment 1348 [Terengganu Enactment No. 2 of 1348] Common Gaming Houses Enactment 1337 [Perlis Enactment No. 11 of 1337] The Gambling and Prohibited Amusements Enactment 1930 [Kelantan Enactment No. 14 of 1930]
- Status: In force

The Common Gaming Houses Act 1953 (Malay: Akta Rumah Judi Terbuka 1953), is a Malaysian law which made illegal common gaming houses, public gaming, and public lotteries. All common gaming houses were declared a nuisance and prohibited by law, and any person found owning an establishment or participating can be charged. Prosecution charging under this Act only need to establish that a game was played in the establishment without having to prove what specific game was played.

== Structure ==
The Common Gaming Houses Act 1953, in its current form (1 January 2006), consists of 28 sections and 3 schedules (including 12 amendments), without separate Part.

- Section 1: Short title
- Section 2: Interpretation
- Section 3: Nuisance
- Section 3A: Specific game need not be stated or proved
- Section 4: Offences relating to common gaming houses
- Section 4A: Assisting in carrying on a public lottery, etc.
- Section 4B: Offences relating to dealing in gaming machines
- Section 5: Advancing or furnishing money for establishing or conducting
- Section 6: Gaming in common gaming house
- Section 7: Gaming in public
- Section 8: Instigating, promoting, or facilitating gaming in public
- Section 9: Buying lottery ticket
- Section 10: Money paid recoverable
- Section 11: Presumption against person selling lottery tickets, etc.
- Section 12: Sales of lottery tickets void
- Section 13: Responsibility of employers and overseers
- Section 14: Arrest by employer
- Section 15: Power to enter on premises
- Section 15A: Closure of premises
- Section 16: Search warrant against premises
- Section 16A: Forfeiture of seized gaming machines
- Section 17: Search warrant against persons
- Section 18: Entry and search by Magistrate or senior police officer
- Section 19: Presumption against house and occupier
- Section 20: Presumption against house, occupier and owner
- Section 20A: Liability of office-bearers, etc.
- Section 21: Order for demolition of structural contrivances for facilitating gaming
- Section 21A: Disconnection of supply of energy
- Section 22: Protection of informers
- Section 22A: Protection of officers, etc.
- Section 23: Offenders as witnesses for prosecution
- Section 23A: Agent to secure evidence
- Section 24: Trial
- Section 25: Binding over on second conviction
- Section 26: Reward to informer
- Section 27: Saving
- Section 27A: Power to license promotion and organization of gaming by a company
- Section 28: Repeal
- Schedules
