= Lau Yew =

Malaysian politician (1915–1948)

Lau Yew attending the London Victory Celebrations of 1946.

Lau Yew (simplified Chinese: 刘尧; traditional Chinese: 劉堯; pinyin: Liú Yáo), born Liu Chang-biao (simplified Chinese: 刘昌标; traditional Chinese: 劉昌標; 1915 – 16 July 1948), was a prominent member of the Malayan Communist Party. He was a member of the Malayan Peoples Anti-Japanese Army (MPAJA)'s Central Military Committee during World War II.

== Biography ==
Lau was born in Hainan in 1915 and joined the Chinese Communist Party in 1931. After escaping to Singapore from the Nationalist government police in 1936, he joined the Anti-Enemy Backing-Up Society a year later in July 1937. Lau became a member of the Malayan Communist Party in February 1940 and received training at the 101 Special Training School (STS 101) in December 1941.

After the war, he held the offices of vice president, chairman, and president of the MPAJA Ex-Service Comrades Association until his death in 1948. Lau Yew is believed to have favoured a seizure of power from the British in 1945 before they had fully re-established themselves in Malaya, but was opposed in this by the MCP's leader Lai Teck. Lau was killed in an ambush in Kajang by the Ferret Force teams on 16 July 1948.
