= Kelasen =

- Location within Borneo
- Coordinates: 1.11667°N 111.55°E
- Country: Malaysia
- State: Sarawak
- Elevation: 91 m (299 ft)

Kelasen (also known as Klassen) is a settlement in Sarawak, Malaysia. It lies on the Pan Borneo Highway approximately 145 kilometres (90 mi) east-south-east of the state capital Kuching. Neighbouring settlements include:

- Munggor 1.9 kilometres (1.2 mi) north
- Entawa 1.9 kilometres (1.2 mi) west
- Guntong 1.9 kilometres (1.2 mi) south
- Bayai 4.1 kilometres (2.5 mi) northwest
- Sangai Tebut 4.1 kilometres (2.5 mi) northeast
- Ibol 4.1 kilometres (2.5 mi) southwest
- Ugol 4.1 kilometres (2.5 mi) northwest
