= Betting Act 1953 =

Malaysian Law

Federal Legislative Council of the Federation of Malaya
- Long title: An Act to suppress betting houses and betting in public places.
- Citation: Act 495
- Territorial extent: Throughout Malaysia
- Enacted: 1953 (Ord. No. 47 of 1953); Revised: 1992 (Act 495 w.e.f. 15 October 1992)
- Effective: Peninsular Malaysia —15 October 1953; Sabah, Sarawak and Federal Territory of Labuan —15 April 1992 [P.U. (B) 164/1992], [P.U. (B) 165/1992]

Amended by
- Federal Constitution (Modification of Laws) (Ordinance and Proclamations) Order 1958 [L.N. 332/1958] Banishment Ordinance 1959 [Ord. 11/1959] Betting (Amendment) Act 1961 [Act 8/1961] Betting (Amendment) Act 1989 [Act A741] Modification of Laws (Common Gaming Houses, Lotteries, Betting and Sweepstakes Duties and Racing) (Totalizator Board) (Extension to the Federal Territory of Labuan) Order 1991 [P.U. (A) 376/1991] Modification of Laws (Common Gaming Houses, Lotteries, Betting and Sweepstakes Duties and Racing) (Totalizator Board) (Extension to the States of Sabah and Sarawak) Order 1991 [P.U. (A) 377/1991]

Related legislation
- Racing (Totalizator Board) Act 1961 [Act 494]
- Status: In force

The Betting Act 1953 (Malay: Akta Pertaruhan 1953), is a Malaysian law enacted to suppress betting houses and betting in public places.

== Structure ==
The Betting Act 1953, in its current form (1 January 2006), consists of 22 sections and no schedule (including 6 amendments), without separate parts.

- Section 1: Short title
- Section 2: Interpretation
- Section 3: Nuisance
- Section 4: Offences relating to common betting houses and betting information centres
- Section 5: Advancing money for conducting
- Section 6: Betting in a common betting house, and book-making
- Section 6A: Penalty for publication or announcement of result of a horse race
- Section 7: Money paid recoverable
- Section 8: Presumption against person accepting or receiving stakes, etc.
- Section 9: Presumption against house and occupier
- Section 9A: Presumptions against betting information centre and occupier
- Section 10: Presumption against house, occupier, and owner
- Section 11: Order for demolition of structural contrivances for facilitating betting
- Section 12: Search warrant against premises
- Section 13: Search warrant against persons
- Section 13A: Arrest and search upon suspicion
- Section 14: Magistrate, Justice of the Peace or Senior Police Officer may search
- Section 14A: Evidence by police officer to be presumptive evidence
- Section 15: Protection of informers from discovery
- Section 16: Examination of offenders
- Section 17: Binding over on second conviction
- Section 18: Trial
- Section 19: Stakes
- Section 20: Exemption from Act
- Section 21: Reward to informer
- Section 22: (Omitted)
