= Election Offences Act 1954 =

Federal Legislative Council of the Federation of Malaya
- Long title: An Act to prevent electoral offences and corrupt and illegal practices at elections; to provide for the establishment of enforcement teams and for matters connected therewith; to provide for the appointment of election agents and to control election expenses; and to provide for election petitions.
- Citation: Act 5
- Territorial extent: Throughout Malaysia
- Enacted: 1954 (Ordinance No. 9 of 1954); Revised: 1969 (Act 5 w.e.f. 12 April 1969)
- Effective: Peninsular Malaysia, Federal Territory of Putrajaya (Note: Note—See section 6 of Act A1095.)—30 April 1954, L.N. 250/1958; Sabah, (Note: Note—For extension and modification of Act to Sabah, see P.U. 56/1966, P.U. 144/1966, P.U. 498/1966, P.U. 348/1967.) Federal Territory of Labuan (Note: Note—See section 6 of Act A585.)—1 August 1965, P.U. 176/1966; Sarawak (Note: Note—For extension and modification of Act to Sarawak, see P.U. 497/1966, P.U. 349/1967, P.U. 55/1968.)—1 November 1966, P.U. 227/1967

Amended by
- Election Offences (Amendment) Ordinance 1955 [Ord. 10/1955] Election Offences (Amendment) Ordinance 1959 [Ord. 10/1959] Local Government Elections (Amendment) Act 1961 [Act 19/1961, s. 10] Election Offences (Amendment) Act 1961 [Act 33/1961] Election Offences (Amendment) Act 1964 [Act 6/1964] Courts of Judicature Act 1964 [Act 7/1964, s. 5] Modification of Laws (Election Offences and Elections) (Extension to Sabah) Order 1966 [P.U. 56/1966] Modification of Laws (Election Offences and Elections) (Extension to Sabah) Order 1966 [P.U. 144/1966] Modification of Laws (Election Offences and Elections) (Extension to Sarawak) Order 1966 [P.U. 497/1966] Modification of Laws (Election Offences and Elections) (Extension to Sabah) (Amendment) Order 1966 [P.U. 498/1966] Modification of Laws (Election Offences and Elections) (Extension to Sabah) (Amendment) Order 1967 [P.U. 348/1967] Modification of Laws (Election Offences and Elections) (Extension to Sarawak) (Amendment) Order 1967 [P.U. 349/1967] Modification of Laws (Election Offences and Elections) (Extension to Sarawak) (Amendment) Order 1968 [P.U. 55/1968] Rules of Court (Election Petition) (Amendment) Rules 1968 [P.U. 104/1968] Election Offences (Amendment) Act 1969 [Act A5] Emergency (Essential Powers) Ordinance No. 45, 1970 [P.U. (A) 282/1970] City of Kuala Lumpur Act 1971 [Act 59] Election Offences (Amendment) Act 1974 [Act A245] Malaysian Currency (Ringgit) Act 1975 [Act 160] Subordinate Courts Act (Extension) Order 1980 [P.U. (A) 357/1980] Notification under Titles of Office Ordinance 1949 [P.U. (B) 57/1982] Election Offences (Amendment) Act 1986 [Act A640] Election Offences (Amendment) Act 1990 [Act A769] Railways (Successor Company) Act 1991 [Act 464] Constitution (Amendment) Act 1994 [Act A885] Election Offences (Amendment) Act 1994 [Act A890] Interpretation (Amendment) Act 1997 [Act A996] Election Offences (Amendment) Act 2002 [Act A1177] Election Offences (Amendment) Act 2003 [Act A1204]

Keywords
- Electoral fraud, political corruption, election agent, election expenses, election petition
- Status: In force

The Election Offences Act 1954 (Malay: Akta Kesalahan Pilihan Raya 1954) is a Malaysian law which enacted to prevent electoral offences and corrupt and illegal practices at elections; to provide for the establishment of enforcement teams and for matters connected therewith; to provide for the appointment of election agents and to control election expenses; and to provide for election petitions.

== Structure ==
The Election Offences Act 1954, in its current form (1 January 2006), consists of 7 Parts containing 42 sections and 2 schedules (including 29 amendments).

- Part I: Preliminary and Interpretation
- Part II: Electoral Offences
- Part III: Corrupt Practices
- Part IV: Election Agent, Election Expenses and Illegal Practices
- Part IVA: Enforcement Team
- Part V: Excuse for Corrupt or Illegal Practice
- Part VI: Grounds for Avoiding Elections
- Part VII: Election Petitions
- Schedules
