= Labis incident =

1950 ambush in Malayan Emergency

- Part of Malayan Emergency
- Labis incident (Peninsular Malaysia)
Date	22 January 1950
Location	Labis, Johore, Malaya
Result	British victory

Belligerents
United Kingdom	MCP; MNLA

Commanders and leaders
(United Kingdom) Unknown	Unknown

Strength
Unknown	40 insurgents

Casualties and losses
1 killed	22 killed 5 wounded

The Labis incident took place during the Malayan Emergency in January 1950. British Gurkhas ambushed a group of communist guerillas five miles north of the Johore town of Labis. In the ensuring battle, 22 communists were killed and five wounded. It was described as the "first major success" by British security forces in the emergency.
