= Death of Lau Yew =

- Part of Malayan Emergency
- Death of Lau Yew (Peninsular Malaysia)
Date	16 July 1948
Location	Kajang, Malaya
Result	Commonwealth victory • Death of a key leader of the Malaysian Communist Party in Lau Yew

Belligerents
United Kingdom; Federation of Malaya; Malayan Police	Malayan Communist Party

Commanders and leaders
Bill Stafford	Lau Yew †

Strength
20 police and detectives	At least 30

Casualties and losses
No serious casualties	11 killed, including 2 leaders

The death of Lau Yew took place at the beginning of the Malayan Emergency. British security forces and Malayan Police clashed with those of the Malayan Communist Party resulting in the death of one of their key leaders, Lau Yew. He had been betrayed by his own bodyguard.

Six people were killed in the initial attack. Five Chinese women who had been captured by the British and Malay people were then killed when 30 Communists counter-attacked.
