= Guntong =

- Location within Borneo
- Coordinates: 1.1°N 111.55°E
- Country: Malaysia
- State: Sarawak
- Elevation: 99 m (325 ft)

Guntong is a settlement in Sarawak, Malaysia. It lies approximately 145.7 kilometres (91 mi) east-south-east of the state capital Kuching. Neighbouring settlements include:

- Kelasen 1.9 kilometres (1.2 mi) north
- Entawa 2.6 kilometres (1.6 mi) northwest
- Sengkuang 2.6 kilometres (1.6 mi) southwest
- Manalong 2.6 kilometres (1.6 mi) southeast
- Ibol 3.7 kilometres (2.3 mi) west
- Munggor 3.7 kilometres (2.3 mi) north
- Sengkuang 4.1 kilometres (2.5 mi) southwest
- Tenyungan 4.1 kilometres (2.5 mi) southwest
- Bayai 5.2 kilometres (3.2 mi) northwest
