= Hasbullah Awang =

Sports commentator (1952–2015)

Yang Hormat Dato’ Hasbullah Awang DIMP AMP AMP PPN
- Born: September 9, 1952; Teluk Intan, Perak, Federation of Malaya (now Malaysia)
- Died: February 12, 2015 (aged 62); Kuala Lumpur, Malaysia
- Occupation: Sports commentator
- Years active: 1974–2015
- Spouse: Hazida Alang Ahmad (m. 1975; died 2015)
- Children: 4

Hasbullah Awang (9 September 1952 – 12 February 2015) was a Malaysian sports commentator. He worked as a sports commentator for Astro Arena from January 2014 until his death in February 2015. Formerly, he was a sports commentator at Radio Television Malaysia.

== Career ==
Hasbullah started his career as a radio announcer on Radio 1 (now Radio Klasik FM). He also became an assistant to operate a special program for kids with Kak Yong. He was better known as a commentator for sports events at home and abroad. His popularity peaked during the football nation into the Semi-Pro era in the early 1990s. He was also a narrator for the Malaysian film, Sumolah, directed by Afdlin Shauki.

Hasbullah had a stint at TV3 as one of the initial presenters of breakfast programme Malaysia Hari Ini in 1994.

He died at the age of 62 at the National Heart Institute of Malaysia in Kuala Lumpur due to heart complication. He was survived by his wife, Hazida Alang Ahmad, four daughters and seven grandchildren, and was buried at the Kota Kemuning Muslim Cemetery, Shah Alam.

On March 25, 2015, he was posthumously awarded the Anugerah Penghargaan Khas at the 2014 UM Sports Awards by the University of Malaya. His older daughter, Jojiana Hasbullah received the award on behalf of her late father.
