= Institut Pendidikan Guru Malaysia Kampus Kota Bharu =

Coordinates: 3°33′39.98″N 101°32′20.02″E

Institut Pendidikan Guru Malaysia Kampus KB
- Pengkalan Chepa, Kelantan; Malaysia

Information
- Type: Teacher training college
- Staff: 56 (approx.)
- Gender: Boys and Girls (Co-Ed)
- Age: 17 to 20
- Enrollment: 480 (approx.)
- Houses: 4
- Colours: White and Blue
- Publication: The Veritas
- Website: http://www.ipkb.edu.my/

Institut Pendidikan Guru Malaysia Kampus Kota Bharu or IPGM Kampus KB (formerly known as Institut Perguruan Kota Bharu) is one of the teachers' colleges under Ministry Of Education situated in Pengkalan Chepa, Kota Bharu, Kelantan, Malaysia. It is owned by Ministry of Education and is also one of the oldest teacher's college in Malaysia, having been created before the independence of Malaysia.

Its various courses and programs include Program Ijazah Sarjana Muda Perguruan, Kursus Perguruan Lepasan Ijazah, and TESL.

== Overview ==
IPGM Kampus KB headed by one Director who is appointed by the Ministry of Education, Malaysia. All of the college's graduates are appointed as government servants automatically to work as educators.
