= Houses of Parliament (Privileges and Powers) Act 1952 =

- Long title: An Act relating to the powers and privileges of the Houses of Parliament, freedom of speech and debate or proceedings in such Houses and protection to persons employed in the publication of papers of such Houses.
- Citation: Act 347
- Territorial extent: Throughout Malaysia
- Enacted: 1952 (F.M. Ord. No. 15 of 1952); Revised: 1988 (Act 347 w.e.f. 6 October 1988)
- Effective: 29 May 1952

Keywords
- Parliamentary privilege
- Status: In force

The Houses of Parliament (Privileges and Powers) Act 1952 (Malay: Akta Majlis Parlimen (Keistimewaan dan Kuasa) 1952), is a Malaysian laws which enacted relating to the powers and privileges of the Houses of Parliament, freedom of speech and debate or proceedings in such Houses and protection to persons employed in the publication of papers of such Houses.

== Structure ==
The Houses of Parliament (Privileges and Powers) Act 1952, in its current form (1 January 2006), consists of only 34 sections and no schedule (including no amendment), without separate Parts.

- Section 1: Short title
- Section 2: Interpretation
- Section 3: Freedom of speech and debate
- Section 4: Power of House to enquire into contraventions
- Section 5: House as a court of record
- Section 6: Members and officers of House exempted from serving as jurors or assessors or, when House is sitting, to attend as witnesses in court
- Section 7: Immunity of members from civil or criminal proceedings for anything done or said before the House
- Section 8: Exemption from liability in damages for any act done under the authority of the House
- Section 9: Power of House to punish for contempt of the House
- Section 10: No member to vote on matters in which he has a direct pecuniary interest
- Section 11: Power of President to issue warrants for apprehension and imprisonment
- Section 12: Contents of warrant
- Section 13: Power of President to order arrest of persons causing disturbance during sitting of House
- Section 14: Duty to assist in the apprehension of persons ordered to be arrested by the President
- Section 15: Power to enter and search premises
- Section 16: Power of House to order attendance of witnesses and production of documents
- Section 17: Attendance to be notified by summons
- Section 18: Examination of witnesses upon oath
- Section 19: Exemption from answering questions or producing documents
- Section 20: Punishment for giving a false answer
- Section 21: Rules relating to privileged evidence apply to evidence before the House
- Section 22: Certificate by President that a witness has answered questions put to him by the House
- Section 23: Prohibition to give evidence outside the House of any evidence before the House without the leave of the House
- Section 24: Journals of the House admissible as evidence
- Section 25: Penalty for printing false copy of law, report, etc.
- Section 26: Certificate of President a defence in proceedings instituted in respect of publications of the House
- Section 27: Privileged publications
- Section 28: President to act notwithstanding dissolution or prorogation of House
- Section 29: Additional penalty by the House
- Section 30: Recovery of penalties
- Section 31: Prosecutions to be instituted only at the instance of the Attorney General
- Section 32: Privileges and immunities of the House of Commons to be enjoyed by the House and members thereof
- Section 33: Privileges, etc., to be judicially noticed
- Section 34: Commons Journals to be prima facie evidence in enquiries touching privileges
