= 1954 Malayan state elections =

State council elections were held in Malaya from 10 to 29 October 1954 in Trengganu and Johore.

== Results ==
=== Johore ===
Party or alliance		Seats
Alliance Party	United Malays National Organisation	11
Alliance Party	Malayan Chinese Association	5
Alliance Party	Malayan Indian Congress	–
Alliance Party	Total	16
Parti Negara		0
Total		16

The candidate - Chelvasingam-Macintyre (Batu Pahat Central) was an associate member of UMNO. This candidate contested under MIC ticket in 1955 Federal Elections. MIC joined the Alliance after Johore elections

=== Trengganu ===
Party or alliance		Seats
Alliance Party	United Malays National Organisation	15
Parti Negara		0
Total		15
