= Michael D. Barr =

Australian academic

Michael D Barr FAHA
- Born: Michael Dominic Barr
- Employer: Flinders University

Michael D Barr is an Australian academic who is known for his work on the study of Singapore and founding prime minister Lee Kuan Yew.

== Academic career ==
Barr is a historian of Singapore.

An article written by Barr for the East Asia Forum was issued issued a correction order under Singapore's fake news law, the Protection from Online Falsehoods and Manipulation Act (POFMA). The publication's website was later blocked in Singapore for non-compliance with the order.

He is currently Associate Professor at Flinders University. He was described in the London Review of Books as "the leading historian of modern Singapore" and in Channel News Asia as an "expert on Singapore politics and history".

Barr was elected a Fellow of the Australian Academy of the Humanities in 2018.

== Bibliography ==
=== Articles ===
- Barr, Michael D. (January 1999). "Lee Kuan Yew: Race, culture and genes". Journal of Contemporary Asia. 29 (2): 145–166. doi:10.1080/00472339980000291. PMID 21980641.
- Barr, Michael D. (2000). "Lee Kuan Yew's Fabian Phase". Australian Journal of Politics & History. 46: 110–126. doi:10.1111/1467-8497.00088.
- Barr, Michael D. (2000). "Trade Unions in an Elitist Society: The Singapore Story". Australian Journal of Politics and History. 46 (4): 480–496. doi:10.1111/1467-8497.00109.
- Paths Not Taken: Political Pluralism in Post-War Singapore (2008), eds Michael D. Barr and Carl A. Trocki, Singapore: NUS Press.
- Michael D. Barr (2010), "Marxists in Singapore? Lee Kuan Yew's Campaign against Catholic Social Justice Activists in the 1980s", Critical Asian Studies, 43(3), 335–362.

=== Books ===
- Barr, Michael D. (2000). Lee Kuan Yew: The Beliefs Behind the Man. Washington D.C.: Georgetown University Press. ISBN 978-0878408160.
- Rahim, Lily Zubaidah; Barr, Michael D., eds. (2019). The Limits of Authoritarian Governance in Singapore's Developmental State. Palgrave Macmillan. doi:10.1007/978-981-13-1556-5. ISBN 978-981-13-1555-8. S2CID 239112493.
- Barr, Michael D. (2014). The Ruling Elite of Singapore: Networks of Power and Influence. Bloomsbury Publishing. ISBN 9780857723680. Archived from the original on 5 March 2024.
- Barr, Michael D. (2019). Singapore: A Modern History. London; New York: Bloomsbury Academic. ISBN 978-1-350-13387-7. OCLC 1097575328.
