= Rubber Trade Association of Penang =

Trade association in Malaysia

- 槟城树胶公会

The Rubber Trade Association of Penang (槟城树胶公会), one of the oldest surviving rubber trade associations in the country, represents the interests of members of the rubber trade in the state. It is also known as the Penang Rubber Trade Association.

== Background ==
The oldest surviving rubber trade body from British Malaya is the Singapore International Chamber of Commerce Rubber Association, formed at a special general meeting of the (then) Singapore Chamber of Commerce and Exchange, at the Exchange Room on 20 June 1911. From its first auction on 12 September till the end of that year, the Singapore Chamber of Commerce Rubber Association held 12 auctions. Fifty-two auctions were held in 1912.

Shortly after, in 1913, the Penang Chamber of Commerce formed a Rubber Association to provide a market for this principal article of local agriculture through weekly auction sales. It was envisaged that large supplies of rubber would be attracted and that there would be regular buyers. When the idea for the Rubber Association was first mooted, Allen Dennys and Company, who had already been performing auctions in Penang since November 1912, in an earlier circular to their clients, asked them to favour the firm by appointing them as their agents, promising to defray all fees due to The Chamber out of the 1 per cent commission charged. The first auction was held on 12 November where 24,707 lbs. were offered of which 22,882 lbs were sold. In January 1915, at the annual general meeting of the Penang Chamber of Commerce, Messrs. Allen Dennys & Co. asked for a fixed fee of $5 be paid in respect of each occasion a seller conducts a sale in the chamber, instead of the prevailing brokerage of one-eighth percent, pointing out that the firm had been the sole supporter of the association and that 91.50 percent of the fees had been borne by them. The committee discussing the issue, objected, pointing out that while the facts relating to the percentage of fees were admitted, that percentage it was also necessary to acknowledge that the business had increased by more than 150 percent since the start of the association fourteen months earlier. At this point, Allen Dennys & Co. had withdrawn from membership in the association, which brought sales in the association room to a halt. Other members were called upon to step forward and fill the place vacated by Allen Dennys & Co. In August 1915, at the half-yearly general meeting chaired by John Mitchell, it was revealed that the position remained the same as advised at the general meeting earlier – no member had come forward with any propositions and the committee had not taken any steps to re-establish sales under the Penang Chamber of Commerce Rubber Association. There was nothing more heard on the subject and the interests of members of Penang's rubber trade remained unrepresented until the advent of the Rubber Trade Association of Penang, in the form of its original incarnation, The Penang Rubber Exchange. Allen Dennys' firm, however, continued to hold rubber auctions, on their own. By late February 1917, the firm had conducted its 258th sale. The results of each of the firm's rubber auctions was published in the Straits Times, the last of which appeared in the issue of 18 May 1918.

== Chronology of early history ==
- The Penang Rubber Exchange was established in 1919 by Khor Ewe-Keng who was also a trustee of the organisation.
- On 7 February 1925, the Penang Rubber Exchange celebrated its sixth anniversary. Ch'ng Eng-Heng, president, presided over a dinner that included Allen Dennys, R.N. Holmes, W. M. Frater, V.D. Volta, P.W. Saffery, K. Mano, Dr. Ando and representative of the Rubber Trade. Heah Joo-Seang, Honorary Secretary, interpreted the speeches of various persons present from the vernacular into English and vice versa.
- On 14 March 1925, at the annual general meeting of the Penang Rubber Exchange, the following were elected office-bearers for the year:– president, Ch'ng Eng-Heng; vice-president, Yeoh Boon-Wan; Hon. Secretary, Heah Joo-Seang; Hon. Asst. Secretary, Lim Pek-Young; Hon. Treasurer, Lam Hor-Tuck; Hon. Auditor, Low Ee-Beng; Committee, Messrs. Khaw Ewe-Keng, Tan Geok-Oh, Ong Keng-Seng, Khoo Heng-Poon, Tan Keat-Yong and Tan Bin-Cheng.
- In 1927, the Penang Rubber Exchange gained exemption from registration.
- In 1930, the Penang Rubber Exchange held its eleventh annual general meeting at its premises, 14 China Street, Penang where the following were elected for 1930: president, Heah Joo-Seang; vice-president, Khoo Beng-Cheang; Hon. Secretary, Lim Pek-Young; Asst. Hon. Secretary Chew Hup-Khim; Hon. Treasurer, Lim Choon-Wah; Hon. Auditor, Lau Ee-Beng; committees, Messrs. Lau Geok-Swee, Tan Leng-Hean, Yeoh Kok-Chim, Cheah Phee-ee, Khor Ewe-Keng, Yeoh Hooi-Yeang, Geh Chor-Oo, Lee Guat-Cheow, Chuah Kee-Teen and Koay Ah-Kim.
- At the 1936 annual general meeting of the Penang Rubber Exchange, it was decided to remit $1,000 in Chinese currency towards the appeal from the Teo Chew Hoay Kuan for funds to build an embankment in Fujian. $500 was also voted towards the maintenance of the Orphans' Institute in Zhongzhou, Fujian and $100 to the Chong Cheng Middle School, Zhengzhou. Office-bearers elected for the year were: president, Lee Guan-Cheow; vice-president, Heah Joo-Seang; secretary, Khaw Pheah-Teng; Asst. Secretary, Phuah Eng Siang; treasurer, Yew Phoo Boh; auditor, Low Ee Beng; Committee, Messrs. Chew Kuan-Say, Geh Chor-Hee, Lim Oon-Kum, Ooi Phang-Kow, Yeoh Hooi-Yang, Tan Leng-Pek, Liew Pit-Lum, Low Geok-Swee, Lum Aik and Co., and Keat Kok Brothers.
- In October 1941, the Penang Rubber Exchange presented a cheque for $3,400 to the commander of the Penang Local Defence Corps for a mobile canteen. In appreciation for this gift, the commander of the Local Defence Corps said that the name of the Penang Rubber Exchange, in English and in Chinese, would be inscribed on the canteen.
- In May 1946 the Penang Rubber Exchange decided to make representations to the chief secretary of the Malayan Union (1) To fix the date for the restoration of Penang's free port status, and not to tax goods already in Penang; and (2) To ask that rubber duties be paid only at Butterworth and Prai, where customs houses had been opened. In early June a petition was sent to the Assistant Comptroller of Customs and Excise pointing out that excise duty levied on Penang "constitutes an injustice to the local rubber trade." The body alleged that "large consignments of rubber, which ordinarily were forwardrd to Penang for sale," had been "diverted to Singapore to the detriment of Penang's interests" as a result of the excise duty then being imposed. The Exchange asked that Penang, being a free port, should enjoy the same privilege as Singapore where no tax was being collected.
- European rubber dealers and packers in Penang and Province Wellesley, through the Penang Chamber of Commerce, agreed to back the Penang Rubber Exchange in any revised scale of handling that The Exchange might propose to labourers.
- At the end of May 1947, the Penang Rubber Exchange called a meeting ro discuss the steps to be taken in view of the decline in the price of rubber. Towards the end of June, the Penang Rubber Exchange together with the Rubber Committee of the Penang Chamber of Commerce presented a revised scale of rates to Penang Harbour labourers. The new rates were 60 percent of the prevailing packing charges and 50 percent of handling and sampan charges. The proposed cost-cutting was relayed by Penang Rubber Exchange Chairman, Saw Seng-Kew to the port labourers through the Penang Harbour Labour Association and the Deputy Commissioner of Labour, Penang.
- In early July N. L. Alexander, the Deputy Commissioner of Labour, called for a meeting between the Penang Rubber Exchange and the Penang Harbour Labour Association whose delegates informed those of The Exchange that, while no final strike decision had been taken, the reduced rates proposed by The Exchange and the Penang Chamber of Commere, had been rejected. Koh Pheah-Teng, Secretary of The Exchange acknowledged the rejection and said The Exchange appreciated the supporting grounds put forward by the labourers that (1) with rubber prices declining there was less work to be done and therefore less income to be had by the dock workers and (2) the cost of living had risen with the increased price of rationed foodstuff and workers were having a difficult time scraping by. He said, however, that handling charges in Penang were more than double the prevailing rates in Singapore, Kuala Lumpur, Perak and Kedah, as a result of which rubber originally intended for Penang had been diverted to other ports – North Perak and Kedah dealers saved on the higher handling charges in Penang by sending their rubber to Province Wellesley, for example. Pheah-Teng said that if labour costs were reduced, it would be the labourers themselves, and not just the rubber dealers who would benefit from the greater flow of trade through the island's port.
- The Exchange accepted an offer by the Penang Federation of Trade Unions to mediate in the dispute over rubber handling charges. The offer was accepted.
- By the middle of July, three out of five rubber factories in Penang had suspended operations owing to the low price of rubber and the corresponding relatively high cost of labour. Traders were concerned that unless steps were taken to reduce port labour costs, Penang might lose the trade altogether. An official of The Exchange pointed out that while packing charges in Kuala Lumpur amounted to $1.10 a bale, Penang labourers were charging as much as $2.13 a bale. If costs could be reduced, Penang could protect its trade.
- By the end of July the idea for Penang first Employers' Union was mooted at a meeting at the Penang Rubber Exchange. Membership was open to all rubber dealers and exporters in Penang and Province Wellesley. The intent was to organise employers in the rubber trade to deal collectively with all matters affecting the industry including seeking a new approach to labour problems.
- Rubber exports from Penang continued its steep drop in July. Exports in May were $23,000,000 down to $16,487,326 in June and $8,955,655 in July.
- At a meeting on 4 September 1947, presided over by the chairman of the Penang Chamber of Commerce, D. A. Mackay, 100 merchants unanimously adopted a resolution to form an Employers' Association. Trade Union Adviser, R. Chaddick was present and addressed the meeting. If tonnage for various commodities had been declining and that increasing quantities of rubber was being packed on the mainland and going south for shipment instead of passing through Penang, and thus depriving Penang's workers of employment, and if high handling charges forced commodities elsewhere then it was only a matter of time before Penang became seriously affected, it was acknowledged.
- Towards the end of September, the newly formed Penang Rubber Trader's Association appointed a three-man sub-committee to draw up labour rates for adoption by the rubber industry in Penang: chairman, R. B Hussey; vice-chairman, Heah Joo-Seang; and secretary, Khaw Pheah-Teng.
- Penang Island was gradually losing its trade to Province Wellesley. 60 percent of rubber stocks in Penang port were stacked in Butterworth godowns. In September, rubber listed as "port stocks" totalled 22,609 tons – a 6,529-ton increase over August – of which 11,602 tons were in Penang, 6,926 tons in Butterworth godowns and 4,676 tons on Penang Island. Figures for the whole of Malaya put total "dealers stocks" in the country at 78,072 tons, a 5,394-ton increase over August.
- By the beginning of October the Chinese and Indian sections of the Harbour Labour Union began revising their scale of handling charges prompted by the action taken by employers to reduce high labour charges in Penang.
- A delegation from Penang was sent to Kuala Lumpur for a discussion with Sir Edward Gent on the economic facts relating to Penang trade and the effect of Government control. Headed by Penang's Resident Commissioner, S. N. King, the delegation also included representatives of the Penang Chamber of Commerce and the Penang Chinese Chamber of Commerce. One of the things on the table was the unfair imposition of export duty at Penang while Singapore was free of this constraint, another, the loss of trade that was leaving the island and going over to Province Wellesley.
- In the middle of October Lee Eng-Thye, president of the Penang Harbour Labour Association announced a reduction in existing labour rates and working regulations. He told Chinese and Indian merchants, however, that the main obstacle to Penang's prosperity was not excessive handling rates but that the free port of Penang was not really "free."
- By the end of October the Penang Chamber of Commerce's Rubber Traders' Association informed the Penang Harbour Labour Union that the former will enforce its revised tariff of rates from 1 November as the prevailing labour rates were so high they were diminishing Penang's rubber trade day after day.
- Towards end November, representatives of the Penang Harbour Labour Association whose rubber workers were then on strike, met with Resident Commissioner S. N. King, giving the latter an account of the events leading to the strike which, by then, had entered its tenth day, and had brought Penang's rubber trade to a standstill. The Resident Commissioner undertook to put the views of the labourers before the Rubber Traders' Association and the Employers Association.
- Elliot H. Simpson, president of New York's E. H. Simpson and Co. Inc. established a truce between workers and employers in the dispute over handling charges and succeeded in persuading workers to return to their jobs after a two-week strike. He noted that workers were under the misapprehension that employers were exploiting them and were making a lot of money at the expense of labourers which was untrue. In fact very little money had been made by exporters due to the tremendous drop in the price of rubber from US 26 cents before to 13 cents and many dealers had lost money as evidenced by the number of failures among rubber producers during the past few months.
- Three days after the truce, workers resumed their strike.
- By the middle of December the, by then, three-week strike in Penang rubber godowns ended when workers accepted a compromise settlement in the dispute with the Rubber Traders' Association over handling rates. By then both rubber dealers and labourers had suffered severe loss as a result of the strike.
- In July 1949 The Exchange cabled details of a plan to help the Malayan rubber industry, to the Secretary of State for the Colonies, Whitehall. A dollar premium on a 20 percent refund of American dollar receipts for rubber shipments to the United States – to be used for the import of American goods – would stimulate exports to the US, increase the price of rubber in Malaya and add to the country's dollar earnings for the Empire Pool, the proposal reasoned. The proposal, signed by Heah Joo-Seang was addressed to the Commissioner-General, Mr. Malcolm MacDonald, the High Commissioner, Sir Henry Gurney, and the Penang Resident Commissioner, A. V. Aston.
- In 1951 the Penang Rubber Exchange became officially known as the Rubber Trade Association of Penang, sanctioned by the registrar of societies.
- In September the association moved to their new premises at Anson Road. The official opening of their new premises was held on 15 September, and a commemorative booklet was issued.
- In 1951, the Government of the Federation of Malaya established, under the Rubber Shipping and Packing Control Ordinance of 1950, the Malayan Rubber Export Registration Board. The Penang Rubber Trade Association was one of the organisations appointed, by Government, to the board and the association nominated its president, Heah Joo-Seang, to represent its interests. Other organisations appointed to the board, and their representatives were: the Singapore Chamber of Commerce Rubber Association (I. G. Salmond and F. I. Waterhouse), the Singapore Chinese Rubber Dealers' Association (Lee Kong-Chian and Tan Puay Hee), the Penang Chamber of Commerce (R. Kirkpatrick), the F.M.S. Chamber of Commerce (C. H. Fell), the United Planting Association of Malaya (J. M. Mason), the Malayan Estate Owners' Association (Yong Shook-Lin), with Sheik Ahmad bin Sheik Mustapha representing smallholders and Lim Chong-Chee representing rubber dealers not otherwise represented. The chairman was J. C. Cobbett.
- Protesting actions taken by the American government that the association deemed against the interests of the natural rubber industry, the association urged the British Government, through the Member of Parliament for Economic Affairs, O. A. Spencer, to take early action. The British Government was urged to make clear to the American Government, that their actions had threatened the sound basis of the industry, were unfriendly and unreasonable and calculated to jeopardise Malaya's economic structure. These were (1) Enforcement of the rejection clause in purchase contracts and limitation of purchases only to certain stock grades; (2) Refusal to buy more natural rubber for stockpiling purposes and freeing the rubber market "only in name"; (3) Reduction of the selling price of synthetic rubber and exportation of fair quantities in active competition with natural rubber; and (4) Introduction of a programme to expand further the production of synthetic by another 100,000 tons a year together with restrictions on the usage of natural rubber to a minimum figure. "We feel the time has come for the British Government to take action to save the rubber industry in Malaya," President Heah Joo-Seang informed The Straits Times.
- In April 1952, the association, writing to rubber trade associations in 11 states and settlements, initiated the formation of a national body to represent the united interests of all rubber traders in Malaya. President Heah Joo-Seang was reported to have said, "the time has come for the rubber trade in this country to get together and speak with one voice."
- In 1952, the Rubber Trade Association of the Federation of Malaya was formed and held its inaugural meeting, on Monday, 2 June 1952, at the premises of the Penang Rubber Trade Association.
- In October, the association celebrated its 33rd anniversary in conjunction with the Chinese mid-Autumn festival.
- By the end of 1953 the world had produced 2,652,500 tons of rubber and consumed 2,432,500 tons and the association estimated, then, that for 1954 production would drop to 2,652,500 tons and consumption to 2,320,000. There was a shortage of slab rubber resulting in several factories in Penang becoming idle and, consequently, a workers employed in the rubber business in Penang, became unemployed. Adding to this, Penang's barter trade with Indonesia had nearly come to a standstill – Penang depended on imports from Myanmar (then Burma) and Indonesia. It was important to find ways to boost consumption and the association moved to hold a meeting in Singapore in April 1954 to improve relations between Malayan rubber exporters and packers, and American importers and manufacturers.
- During the last quarter of 1952 a Malayan Federation Trade Mission to China, its rubber section headed by Tan Boon-Peng, secretary of the association, successfully introduced a new grade of rubber based on samples produced by the Penang Rubber Trade Association, 3,000 tons of which was purchased by the China National Import and Export Corporation.
- Heah Joo-Seang was unanimously re-elected President at the annual meeting of the association in April 1957.
- In March 1958 the association decided to give its entire library, comprising around 2,000 books valued at $3,000, to the Penang Chinese Girl's High School.
- In February 1962, following a meeting between the Government of the Federation of Malaya and Penang rubber interests which decided to restore the method of trade between Penang and Indonesia to that existing before 1 December 1961, the association appointed an 11-man sub-committee to be responsible for the payment of duty and cesses on rubber produced on Penang Island. Its president, Heah Joo-Seang was appointed advisor to the sub-committee comprising the following elected members: Tan Boon-Peng, Lee Guat Cheow, Khor Piah-Teng (Khaw Pheah-Teng), Tan Hoay-Eam, Khoo Hock-Thye, Chan Hor-Swee, Chew Chan-Seng, Lye Cheok-Sam, Tan Cheng-Hooi, Saw Seng-Kew and Loh Say-Bee. The meeting between the Federal Government and Penang's rubber trade had been called following representations by local traders against the enforcement of the Rubber Export Duty (Penang) Act 1962 which took effect on 1 January 1962. Speaking to those present at the association, Joo-Seang said the new system agreed to had produced immediate results − 2,000 tons of rubber had been imported into Penang after agreement was reached the previous week with 6,000 to 7,000 tons more expected in the next few days. The new arrangement had safeguarded Penang's free port status and rubber from Indonesia could now be imported freely − Indonesian traders had previously threatened to divert all shipments to Singapore. That would have lost Penang its traditional entrepot trade with that country − over 40,000 tons of Indonesian rubber being imported into Penang annually in previous years − which would have had serious repercussions on employment. Having had the situation explained to them, unanimous support was given for the new arrangements i.e. noduty or cesses would be payable when exporting rubber from Penang Island, Customs would cease weighing rubber imported into Penang, Government would estimate the quantity of rubber expected to be produced in Penang Island each year, and the estimate to be revised from year to year.

== Closely connected to the Malaysian Rubber Board ==
- The Penang Rubber Trade Association was a founding member of the historical form of the company that came to be known, in 1996, as the Malaysian Rubber Board.
- In January 1962, the House of Representatives (Dewan Rakyat) passed the Malaya Rubber Exchange (Incorporation) Bill. The Bill provided for the establishment of a rubber market in Malaya and the formation of a company set up and carrying on the business of a clearing house or settlement house, or both, to facilitate mercantile business, deal with all questions connected with the trade, marketing and distribution of rubber and the encouragement of research in the uses of rubber. It was also envisaged that the company act as arbitrators, or appoint arbitrators and umpires to mediate and settle disputes affecting rubber deals. The main object of the newly formed Malayan Rubber Exchange was identified as the promotion and development of the Malayan rubber industry, and the Penang Rubber Trade Association and its interests were represented through its ordinary membership in the new entity, these were further safeguarded through the appointment, by government, of its president, Heah Joo-Seang to the board of directors of the new entity. Cheah Ewe-Keat, director of Harper Gilfillan & Co. was selected chairman of the board of directors of the new entity with Tee Teh, president of the Federation of Rubber Traders' Association as his deputy chairman. Other directors named were: J. Brown, Chan Chong-Wen, Heah Joo-Seang, J. L. Landolt, Leong Hoe-Yeng, Lim Yee-Teck, Tan Siow-Hoon, Yeap Ghee-Chuan, and Lew Sip-Hon. The Malayan Rubber Exchange was set up as a corporation and 59 members, both individuals and firms, were mentioned in the bill.
- In 1972, through the Malaysian Rubber Exchange and Licensing Board Act 1972, The Malaysian Rubber Exchange and Licensing Board was created and replaced the Malayan Rubber Exchange and the Malayan Rubber Export Registration Board.
- In 1996, the Malaysian Rubber Board (Incorporation) Act 1996 dissolved the Malaysian Rubber Exchange and Licensing Board, along with the Malaysian Rubber Research and Development Board, the Rubber Research Institute of Malaysia and the board of the Rubber Research Institute of Malaysia and established in their place the Malaysian Rubber Exchange and Licensing Board.

== List of presidents ==
- Khor Ewe-Keng (1919)
- Ch'ng Eng-Heng (1925)
- Heah Joo-Seang (1930)
- Lee Guat-Cheow (1936)
- Saw Seng-Kew
- Heah Joo-Seang (1949–1955)
- Lee Guat-Cheow (1956–1958, Acting)
- Heah Joo-Seang (1959–1962)
- Saw Choo-Theng (1962–1974)
- Koh Peng-Ting(1975)
