= Robert Porter Bingham =

Colonial administrator in British Malaya (1903-1982

Robert Porter Bingham CMG

Resident Commissioner of Penang
- In office 1950 (acting 1950-51) – 1957
- Preceded by: Arthur Vincent Aston
- Succeeded by: Post abolished

Personal details
- Born: 3 January 1903
- Died: 1982 (aged 78–79)
- Spouse: Elizabeth Walker
- Children: 1 son
- Education: Trinity College, Dublin
- Occupation: Colonial administrator

Robert Porter Bingham CMG (3 January 1903 – 1982) was a colonial administrator in British Malaya. He served as the last Resident Commissioner of Penang from 1950 to 1957.

== Early life and education ==
Bingham was born on 3 January 1903, the son of R.W. Bingham of Dungannon, County Tyrone. He was educated at Royal School, Dungannon and Trinity College, Dublin.

== Career ==
In 1926, Bingham entered the Malay Civil Service as a cadet. After studying Chinese in China, in 1928 he was appointed Protector of Chinese, serving in various parts of Malaya until 1941. In 1931, he served briefly as District Officer, Christmas Island. From 1942 to 1945 he was interned in Singapore as a POW.

In 1946, he was appointed Commissioner of Labour in Singapore, and had to deal with serious labour unrest and strikes, while he also encouraged the formation of non-Communist trade unions.

From 1950-51, he was Secretary for Chinese Affairs for the Federation of Malaya, and became a member of the Federal Council. In 1950, he was appointed acting Resident Commissioner of Penang, Federation of Malaya, becoming Resident Commissioner the following year, and remained in office until the post was abolished in 1957.

His last public function took place at a ceremony in Penang on 31 August 1957 attended by 25,000 people when he received the Union Jack after it had been lowered from the flagstaff of Fort Cornwallis, and handed over the constitutional instrument marking the end of 171 years of British rule.

== Personal life ==
Bingham married Elizabeth Walker in 1936 and they had one son.

== Honours ==
Bingham was appointed Companion of the Order of St Michael and St George (CMG) in the 1956 Birthday Honours.
