= Ian Blelloch =

British colonial administrator (1901–1982)

Dato’ Ian William Blelloch CMG (2 August 1901 – 25 March 1982) was a British colonial administrator in Malaya.

Blelloch was educated at Dunfermline High School and Edinburgh University. He was a cadet of the Federated Malay States (1926), District Officer of Krian (Class III), District Officer of Raub (1932) (Class IV), Acting British Adviser for Terengganu and the last posting British Adviser for Perak (1951–1956). His monthly salary as the Adviser for Perak was M$1500.

Blelloch was awarded the Perak Meritorious Service Medal in 1953. He was appointed CMG in 1955, Officer of the Order of St John in 1957, and Commander of that Order in 1964. He was created Dato’ by the Sultan of Perak in 1956.

Political offices
Preceded by James Innes Miller	British Adviser of Perak; 1951 – 1956	Succeeded by post abolished

== Sources and references ==
- WorldStatesmen - Malaysia
- Arkib Negara Malaysia
