= Arthur Vincent Aston =

Arthur Vincent Aston CMG MC
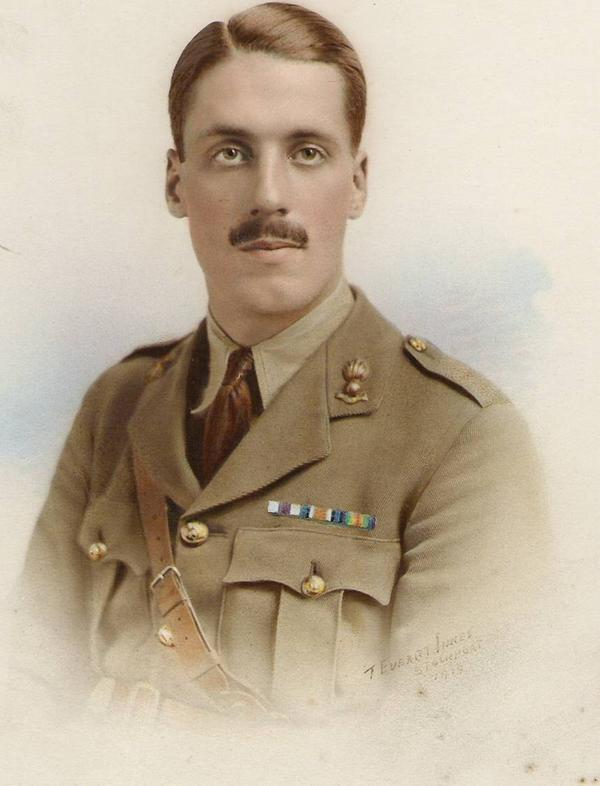

British Adviser for Perak
- In office 1946–1948
- Preceded by: Marcus Rex
- Succeeded by: James Innes Miller

Personal details
- Born: 1896 Chester, Cheshire, England
- Died: 1981 (aged 84–85) Wiltshire, England
- Spouse: Patricia Jane Williams
- Children: 2
- Profession: Colonial Administrator

Arthur Vincent Aston CMG MC (1896–1981), was a colonial administrator in British Malaya (later the Malayan Union and then the Federation of Malaya). He was the first British adviser for Perak after the abolition of the post of British Resident of Perak, and Resident Commissioner of Penang from 1948 to 1951.

== Education and career ==
Aston was educated at The King's School, Chester and Queen's College, Oxford. He served in World War I as a Royal Field Artillery cadet, being promoted to 2nd lieutenant in July 1916. He was then employed in the Malayan Civil Service from 1919 until 1951.

During his pre-war career, Aston served as the district officer of Telok Anson, as the Malayan Civil Service Chairman of Kinta Sanitary Board, as the Acting Resident Councillor of Penang from 1 April 1933 to 20 April 1933, as the Acting Resident Councillor of Malacca and as the British Adviser for Perak from 1946 to 1948. During World War II he was an internee at Changi and Sime Road during the Japanese occupation of Malaya and Singapore.

After the war, Aston was the Resident Commissioner of Penang from 1948 to 1950 and 1950 to 1951.

== Family ==
Aston married Patricia Williams and had two sons. He lived at the Mill House, Swallowcliffe, Wiltshire, England. He died in 1981.

== Honours ==
Aston was decorated with the Military Cross in July 1917: "When acting as artillery liaison officer he took command of a body of infantry at a critical moment when their commander was wounded and the advance held up, and led them to the attack with great dash and promptitude, thereby enabling our advance to continue".

In 1950 he was appointed Companion of the Order of St. Michael and St. George (CMG).

Government offices
Preceded by Marcus Rex as British Resident of Perak	British Adviser for Perak; 1946–1948	Succeeded by James Innes Miller
