= Ibrahim of Kelantan =

Sultan of Kelantan (r. 1944–1960)

Ibrahim إبراهيم
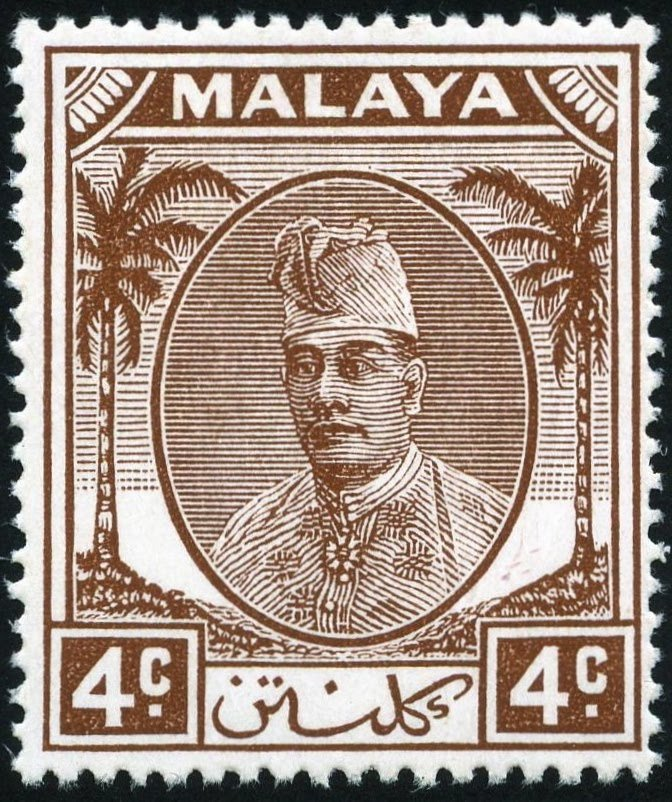
- Portrait on a 1951 issue stamp

Sultan of Kelantan
- Reign: 21 June 1944 – 9 July 1960
- Coronation: 31 October 1944
- Predecessor: Sultan Ismail
- Successor: Sultan Yahya Petra
- Born: 9 October 1897; Istana Balai Besar, Kota Bharu, Kelantan, Unfederated Malay States, British Malaya
- Died: 9 July 1960 (aged 62); Istana Sri Cemerlang, Kota Bharu, Kelantan, Malaya
- Burial: 10 July 1960; Langgar Royal Mausoleum, Kota Bharu, Kelantan, Malaya
- Spouse: Tengku Zainab binti Tengku Zainal Abidin (m. 1914) Tengku Yah binti Tengku Long Sulaiman (m. 1915; div. 1929): Cik Embong binti Daud; Cik Siti; Cik Safiah; Cik Habiba
- Issue: List: Tengku Petra; Tengku Indera Petra; Tengku Yahya Petra; Tengku Zainal Mulok; Tengku Iskandar Shah; Tengku Feissal; Tengku Badrul Alam; Tengku Abdul Halim; Tengku Rustam; Tengku Shibli Shah; Tengku Nizam; Tengku Shariman; Tengku Aman Shah; Tengku Thuraya; Tengku Wuk; Tengku Zubaida; Tengku Nurul Aini; Tengku Mastura; Tengku Mariam; Tengku Petri; Tengku Farida; Tengku Rashida; Tengku Anis; Tengku Maznah; Tengku Latifah Hanam; Tengku Farida Hanim; Tengku Fatihah
- House: Long Yunus
- Father: Sultan Muhammad IV ibni Almarhum Sultan Muhammad III
- Mother: Sultanah Zainab binti Nik Wan Muhammad Amin
- Religion: Sunni Islam

Sultan Ibrahim ibni Almarhum Sultan Muhammad IV, KCMG, (Jawi: سلطان إبراهيم ابن المرحوم سلطان محمد ٤; 9 October 1897 – 9 July 1960) was the Sultan of Kelantan from 1944 to 1960.

He was born at the Istana Balai Besar in Kota Bharu to Sultan Muhammad IV and his wife, Sultanah Zainab binti Nik Wan Muhammad Amin. On 22 June 1911, his father appointed him "Tengku Sri Indra Mahkota Kelantan", becoming the heir apparent on 21 April 1921.

He served as deputy Judge of the High Court and later represented his brother in Singapore in 1942. He became sultan on 21 June 1944, upon the death of his brother, Sultan Ismail and was crowned sultan at Istana Balai Besar four months later. In 1953, he attended the coronation of Queen Elizabeth II in London where he shared an open carriage in the rain with Queen Sālote Tupou III of Tonga.

He married six times and had 13 sons and 14 daughters. Sultan Ibrahim died from a cerebral haemorrhage in Istana Sri Cemerlang, Kota Bahru, on 9 July 1960 aged 63 after a reign of 16 years. He was succeeded as sultan by his third son, Yahya Petra.

== Honours ==
=== Honours of Kelantan ===
- Recipient and Grand Master of the Royal Family Order of Kelantan (DK) (20 June 1944 – 9 July 1960).
- Grand Master and Knight Grand Commander of the Order of the Crown of Kelantan (SPMK) (20 June 1944 – 9 July 1960).
- Grand Master of the Order of the Life of the Crown of Kelantan (20 June 1944 – 9 July 1960).
- Grand Master of the Order of the Most Distinguished and Most Valiant Warrior (PYGP) (20 June 1944 – 9 July 1960).

=== Honour of Malaysia ===
- Malaysia
  - Recipient of the Order of the Crown of the Realm (DMN) (31 August 1958).

=== Foreign Honours ===
- United Kingdom
  - Honorary Knight Commander of the Order of St Michael and St George (KCMG, 10 June 1948)
  - Companion of the Order of St Michael and St George (CMG, 4 June 1934)
  - King George V Silver Jubilee Medal (6 May 1935)
  - King George VI Coronation Medal (12 May 1937)
  - Queen Elizabeth II Coronation Medal (2 June 1953)
- Brunei
  - Member First Class of the Family Order of Laila Utama (DK) – Dato Laila Utama (1959)

Preceded by Sultan Ismail of Kelantan	Sultan of Kelantan; 1944–1960	Succeeded by Sultan Yahya Petra of Kelantan
