= Mohamad Sheriff Osman =

Malaysian politician (1890–1962)

Dato' Sir Haji Mohamad Sheriff bin Osman, KBE (5 August 1890 – 27 September 1962) was the first Chief Minister of Kedah. Sheriff was the Menteri Besar of Kedah from 1948 until 1954. The Menteri Besar is appointed by the Sultan of Kedah among members of the State Legislative Assembly. As the Menteri Besar of Kedah, he was the head of the executive branch of the government in the Malaysian state of Kedah.

== Life and career ==
He was born in Alor Star and received his education in Penang Free School. Prior to his appointment as Menteri Besar, he was appointed to key positions in the Kedah state government as follows:

- 1910–1912: Deputy State Secretary II
- 1912–1914: Director of Lands and Surveys, Kedah State
- 1915–1917: Deputy State Secretary I
- 1917–1932: Interpreter at the British Adviser's Office; State Civil Services Department Director
- 1932–1948: State Secretary of Kedah, retired at the age of 58 after a long period of service as a government servant.

== Death ==
He died on 27 September 1962, aged 72 and was buried at the Al-Ghufran Muslim Cemetery in Alor Akar, Alor Setar.
