= Mongolian Liberal Union Party =

- Leader: Olhunud Daichin
- Founded: 2006
- Headquarters: Osaka Prefecture
- Ideology: Southern Mongolian independence Liberalism

Party flag

Website
- www.lupm.org

Mongolian Liberal Union Party (Mongolian: Монголын эрх чөлөө холбооны нам, Japanese: モンゴル自由連盟党, Chinese: 蒙古自由联盟党) is a party which aims to separate Inner Mongolia (Southern Mongolia) from China.

The party was started in 2006 in Osaka Prefecture, Japan. The current leader is Olhunud Daichin. In May 2012, the MLUP's website was downed for several days as what was believed to be a cyberattack; those responsible have not been caught.

In 2016, the South Mongolia Congress was established by Temtsiltu Shobtsood, who had been expelled from the Inner Mongolian People's Party, together with Olhunud Daichin. Its formation brought together a coalition of non-mainstream groups within the Inner Mongolian independence movement.

From that point onward, and continuing to the present, Olhunud Daichin has conducted his activities under the name of the South Mongolia Congress. As a result, the Mongolian Liberal Union Party has effectively ceased all activities and has not carried out any activities under its own name.

== See also ==
- Southern Mongolian independence movement
- Inner Mongolian People's Party
- Southern Mongolian Democratic Alliance
