= Stateless nation =

Ethnic group or nation that does not possess its own state

A stateless nation is an ethnic group or nation that does not possess its own sovereign state. Use of the term implies that such ethnic groups have the right to self-determination, to establish an independent nation-state with its own government. Members of stateless nations may be citizens of the country in which they live, or they may be denied citizenship by that country. Stateless nations are usually not represented in international sports or in international organisations such as the United Nations. Nations without a state are classified as fourth-world nations. Some stateless nations have a history of statehood, while some were always stateless.

== History ==
The term was coined in 1983 by political scientist Jacques Leruez in his book L'Écosse, une nation sans État about the position of Scotland within the United Kingdom. It was later adopted and popularized by Scottish scholars such as David McCrone, Michael Keating and T. M. Devine.

Ethnicities described as stateless nations can be dispersed across a number of states (for example, the Yoruba people found in the African states of Nigeria, Benin and Togo) or from the native population of a province within a larger state (such as the Uyghur people in the Xinjiang Uyghur Autonomous Region within the People's Republic of China). Some stateless nations historically had a state, which was absorbed by another; for example, Tibet's declaration of independence in 1913 was not recognized, and it was reunited in 1951 by the People's Republic of China - which claims that Tibet is an integral part of China, while the Tibetan government-in-exile maintains that Tibet is an independent state under an unlawful occupation.

Stateless nations can have large populations; for example, the Kurds have an estimated population of over 30 million people, which makes them one of the largest stateless nations.

== Nation-states and nations without states ==
The symbiotic relationship between nations and states arose in Western Europe during the 18th century, and it was exported to the rest of the world through colonial rule. Whereas the Western European nation-states are at present relinquishing some of their powers to the European Union, many of the former colonies are now the zealous defenders of the concept of national statehood. However, not all peoples within multi-cultural states consider themselves stateless nations. As not all states are nation states, there are ethnic groups who live in multinational states that are not considered "stateless nations".

Only a small fraction of the world's national groups have associated nation states; the rest are distributed in one or more states. While there are over 3000 estimated nations in the world, there were only 193 member states of the United Nations as of 2011, of which fewer than 20 are considered to be ethnically homogeneous nation states. Thus nation states are not as common as often assumed, and stateless nations are the overwhelming majority of nations in the world.

== Consequences of colonialism and imperialism ==
During the imperial and colonial era, powerful nations extended their influence outside their homeland; resulting in many colonized nations ceasing to be self-governing and being described as stateless nations thereafter. Some nations have been victims of "carve-outs" that left their homeland divided among several countries. Even today, the colonial boundaries form modern national boundaries. These boundaries often differ from cultural boundaries which results in situations wherein people who speak the same language or have the same culture are divided by national borders; for example, New Guinea is split into the regions of West Papua (a former Dutch colony) and Papua New Guinea (a former Australian colony). During decolonization, the colonial powers imposed a unified state structure irrespective of the ethnic differences and granted independence to their colonies as a multinational state. This led to successor states with many minority ethnic groups in them, which increased the potential for ethnic conflicts. Some of these minority groups campaigned for self-determination. Stateless nations were not protected in all countries and as a result, they became victims of atrocities such as discrimination, ethnic cleansing, genocide, forced assimilation, and the exploitation of labor and natural resources.

== Nationalism and stateless nations ==
People with a common origin, history, language, culture, customs or religion can turn into a nation through the awakening of national consciousness. A nation can exist without a state, as is exemplified by the stateless nations. Citizenship is not always the nationality of a person. In a multinational state, different national identities can coexist or compete: for example, in Britain English nationalism, Scottish nationalism, and Welsh nationalism exist and are held together by British nationalism. Nationalism is often connected to separatism because a nation is considered to achieve completeness through its independence.

Throughout history, numerous nations declared their independence, but not all succeeded in establishing a state. Even today, there are active autonomy and independence movements around the world. The claim of the stateless nations to self-determination is often denied due to geopolitical interests and increasing globalization of the world. Stateless nations sometimes show solidarity with other stateless nations and maintain diplomatic relations.

== List of stateless nations ==
States made bold under the "homeland" column are countries of the respective ethnic groups which are native to them and still host the majority (more than half) of their population.

People	Flag	Languages	Language family (Note: Can also help with understanding the cultural/ethnic proximity with other people of that paternal language group, but not necessarily. The largest language family is not recommended, as a large number of cells would contain similar content.)	Predominant religion	Population	Continent	States	Homeland (Note: Proposed or historical homeland desired.)	Irredentist movement	Notes
Tamils		Tamil language	Dravidian languages	Hinduism, Christianity, Islam	80,000,000	Asia	India, Sri Lanka	Tamil Nadu, Northern Province, Sri Lanka	Tamil nationalism, Dravida Nadu	Historically ruled Tamilakam, the Jaffna Kingdom and the Vanni chieftaincies. Seeks more regional autonomy for the Indian state of Tamil Nadu or form a sovereign nation along with other South Indian states as Dravida Nadu. Demand for autonomy in the Northern and Eastern Provinces or total secession from Sri Lanka.
Oromo people		Oromo	Cushitic languages	Christian, Muslim, Waaqeffanna	41,693,650	Africa	Ethiopia, Kenya	Oromia	Oromo conflict	
Kurds		Kurdish languages, (originally) Arabic, Turkish, Persian (assimilation)	Iranian languages	Islam (Sunni, Shia, Alevi), Zoroastrianism, Yarsanism, Yazidism	36,000,000–46,000,000	Asia	Turkey, Iran, Iraq, Syria (homeland), Germany (largest diaspora)	Kurdistan	Kurdish nationalism, Kurdish–Turkish conflict, Kurdish-Iranian conflict, Iraqi–Kurdish conflict, and Kurdish–Syrian conflict, 2017 Kurdistan Region independence referendum	Regional autonomy achieved in Iraqi Kurdistan and Rojava. Data rough due to censuses not taking ethnicity in homeland countries.
Yoruba people		Yoruba language	Volta–Congo languages	Christianity, Islam, Yoruba religion	35,000,000	Africa	Nigeria, Benin and Togo, Ghana	Yorubaland	Oodua Peoples Congress	
Igbo people		Igbo, English	Volta–Congo languages	Christianity (primarily Roman Catholicism with significant Protestant minorities), Indigenous beliefs	30,000,000	Africa	Nigeria (almost exclusively)	Igboland	Movement for the Actualization of the Sovereign State of Biafra, Indigenous People of Biafra	Attempted secession from Nigeria in 1967 sparked the Nigerian Civil war.
Sikhs		Punjabi, Dogri, Kashmiri	Indo-Aryan languages, Dardic languages	Sikhism	25,000,000–30,000,000	Asia	India	Punjab	Khalistan movement	Seeks greater regional autonomy for the Sikhs of Punjab or total secession from India. Sikh nationalism.
Occitans		Occitan, French, Italian, Spanish	Romance languages	Roman Catholicism	16,000,000	Europe	France, Monaco, Italy and Spain (Val d'Aran)	Occitania	Occitan nationalism (Occitan Party, Partit de la Nacion Occitana, Libertat)	Seek self-determination, greater autonomy or total secession from France.
Savoyard people		Savoyard, Arpitan, French, Italian, German	Romance languages Germanic languages	Roman Catholicism	1,309,384	Europe	France, Switzerland and Italy	Savoy	Savoyard nationalism (Savoyan League, Savoy Region Movement, État de Savoie, Piemonte Stato)	Seek self-determination, greater autonomy or total secession from France.
Assamese people		Assamese language	Indo-Aryan languages	Hinduism	15,000,000	Asia	India	Assam	Assam separatist movements, ULFA Insurgency in Northeast India	Seeks greater regional autonomy for natives of Assam or total secession from India.
Uyghur people		Uyghur language	Turkic languages	Sunni Islam	15,000,000	Asia	China, Kazakhstan, Uzbekistan	East Turkestan (Uyghuristan)	Irredentism is politically fragmented (East Turkestan Liberation Organization, East Turkestan independence movement)	Limited autonomy in the Xinjiang Uyghur Autonomous Region.
Zulu people		Zulu language	Volta–Congo languages	Christianity, Zulu religion	12,159,000	Africa	South Africa, Lesotho, Zimbabwe, Eswatini	KwaZulu-Natal	Inkatha Freedom Party	Limited autonomy in the KwaZulu-Natal region, which maintains a traditional Zulu king.
Hazaras		Persian language	Iranian Languages	Islam (mostly Shia)	10,000,000-14,000,000	Asia	Afghanistan	Hazaristan	Persecution of Hazaras	Hazara nationalism
Romani people		Romani language	Indo-Aryan languages	Christianity, Islam, Hinduism	12,000,000	Worldwide, mostly Eastern Europe and Americas		Originally North India; Romanistan (proposed country)		The Romani people are a non-territorial nation.
Kongo people		Kongo language, Lingala, Portuguese, French	Volta–Congo languages	Christianity (Catholicism and Protestantism), African traditional religions	11,560,000 (2002 estimate)	Africa	Democratic Republic of the Congo, Republic of the Congo, Angola	Kongo	Kongo nationalism, Bundu dia Kongo	Historically occupied the independent Kingdom of Kongo.
Manchus		Manchu, Mandarin Chinese	Tungusic languages	Manchu shamanism, Buddhism, Chinese folk religion, Christianity	10,682,263	Asia	China, Taiwan, Hong Kong	Manchuria	Manchurian nationalism	
Maya peoples		Mayan languages	Mayan languages	Christianity (Catholicism), Maya religion	10,500,000 (2002 estimate)	North America	Guatemala, Mexico, Belize, Honduras, El Salvador	Mesoamerica	Pan-Maya movement, Rigoberta Menchú, Zapatista Army of National Liberation	Historically occupied the Maya civilization.
Sylhetis		Sylheti language	Indo-Aryan languages	Islam, Hinduism, Christianity	10,300,000	Asia	Bangladesh and India	Greater Sylhet	Sylheti nationalism	The Sylheti people advocate for the recognition of Sylheti as a distinct language, separate from Bengali, and emphasize the preservation and promotion of their cultural and linguistic identity.
Baloch people		Balochi	Iranian languages	Sunni Islam	10,000,000	Asia	Pakistan, Iran, Afghanistan	Balochistan	Balochistan conflict, Baloch nationalism	Seek to establish an independent sovereign state for the Baloch people, separate from Pakistan and Iran.
Andalusians		Andalusian Spanish, English (in Gibraltar)	Romance languages	Christianity (Roman Catholicism)	9,500,000	Europe	Spain, Gibraltar	Andalusia	Andalusian nationalism	See also Nationalisms and regionalisms of Spain.
Catalans		Catalan, Occitan, Catalan Sign Language	Romance languages, Catalan Sign Languages	Roman Catholicism, Agnosticism	8,500,000	Europe	Spain, Italy, Andorra and France	Catalan Countries	Catalan independence movement, Catalan nationalism	See also Nationalisms and regionalisms of Spain. Historically occupied most of the Crown of Aragon: the Principality of Catalonia, the kingdoms of Valencia and Mallorca and part of Aragon, and the Kingdom of Sardinia's town of Alghero.
Lombard people		Lombard language	Romance languages	Christianity (Roman Catholic, Ambrosian Rite)	8,221,000 (2002 estimate)	Europe	Italy, Switzerland	Lombardy (historical region)	Lombard nationalism, Pro Lombardy Independence, Lombard League	
Québécois		Quebec French	Romance languages	Christianity (Roman Catholicism)	8,215,000	North America	Canada	Quebec	Quebec sovereignty movement, Quebec nationalism	The total population of the Province of Quebec is 8.2 million, of which over 80% are French speakers.
Kashmiri people		Kashmiri language	Indo-Aryan languages	Islam, Hindu minority	8,050,000 (2002 estimate)	Asia	India and Pakistan	Kashmir	Insurgency in Jammu and Kashmir	Administered by India (Kashmir Valley, Jammu, Ladakh), Pakistan (Azad Kashmir, Gilgit-Baltistan) and China (Aksai Chin).
Hongkongers		Hong Kong Cantonese, Hong Kong English	Sino-Tibetan languages	Christianity (Protestantism and Roman Catholicism), Buddhism, Chinese folk religion, Taoism, Islam	7,498,100	Asia	China	Hong Kong	Hong Kong nationalism, Hong Kong independence movement	Limited autonomy in the Hong Kong Special Administrative Region.
Tibetan people		Tibetan language, Chinese language, Tibetan Sign Language	Sino-Tibetan languages, Tibetan Sign Language	Buddhism	7,000,000	Asia	China, India, Nepal	Tibet	Tibetan independence movement	Limited autonomy in the Tibet Autonomous Region. Historically occupied the Tibetan Empire.
Moro people		Filipino language, other Philippine languages	Austronesian languages	Islam	6,356,000 (2002 estimate)	Asia	Philippines	Muslim Mindanao	Moro autonomy	The Moro people of Muslim Mindanao has since been granted autonomy as the Bangsamoro Autonomous Region with the adoption of the Bangsamoro Organic Law.
Riffian people		Riffian language, Arabic	Berber languages	Islam	6,000,000	Africa	Morocco and Spain	Rif	Rif War, Rif Republic	95% of the land is controlled by Morocco with the rest being controlled by the Spanish territories of Ceuta and Melilla as autonomous cities.
Mon		Mon language	Austroasiatic languages	Buddhism	5,350,000 (2002 estimate)	Asia	Myanmar	Mon State		Historically occupied Hanthawaddy kingdom
Hmong people		Hmong language	Hmong–Mien languages	Animism	5,200,000 (2002 estimate)	Asia	Laos, China, Vietnam, Myanmar and Thailand	Hmong ChaoFa Federated State	Insurgency in Laos	
Arakanese (Rakhine)		Rakhine language	Sino-Tibetan languages	Buddhism	5,110,000 (2002 estimate)	Asia	Myanmar	Rakhine State	United League of Arakan	Historically occupied Kingdom of Mrauk U
Circassians		Adyghe language, Kabardian language, Ubykh language, Russian	Northwest Caucasian languages	Islam	5,300,000	Europe	Russia	Circassia	Russo-Circassian War, Circassian nationalism	95–97% of Circassians were killed or exiled by Russia during the Circassian genocide.
Shan		Shan language	Kra–Dai languages	Buddhism	5,000,000	Asia	Myanmar	Shan State	Restoration Council of Shan State; Shan State Progressive Party; Peace and Solidarity Committee	Historically occupied Federated Shan States
Sicilians		Sicilian, Italian, Gallo-Italic of Sicily, Arbëresh	Romance languages	Christianity (Roman Catholicism)	5,000,000 (only Sicily)	Europe	Italy	Sicily	Sicilian nationalism, Sicilian Action Movement	Regional autonomy in Sicily.
Venetian people		Venetian language	Romance languages	Catholicism	5,000,000 (est.)	Europe	Italy	Veneto	Venetian nationalism	Many groups seek for total independence from Italy, while some just want more autonomy and recognition of Venetian language and people. Historically occupied the independent Republic of Venice.
Scottish people		Scottish Gaelic, Scots	Celtic languages	Christianity (Protestantism, Catholic minority)	5,000,000 (only Scotland)	Europe	United Kingdom	Scotland	Scottish independence	Formerly a Sovereign state, Regional autonomy in Scotland.
Bretons		Breton, Gallo	Celtic languages	Roman Catholicism	4,800,000	Europe	France	Brittany	Breton nationalism	Seek self-determination, greater autonomy or total secession from France.
Karen (Kayin)		Karenic languages	Sino-Tibetan languages	Buddhism, Christianity	4,400,000 (2002 estimate)	Asia	Myanmar, Thailand	Kayin State	Karen National Union	
Camba		Camba Spanish	Romance languages	Roman Catholicism	4,000,000	South America	Bolivia	Media Luna	Movimiento Nación Camba de Liberación, Santa Cruz Youth Union	
Kabyle people		Kabyle language, Algerian Arabic	Berber languages	Islam	4,000,000	Africa	Algeria	Kabylia	Movement for the Autonomy of Kabylie, Provisional Government of Kabylia	
Rohingya		Rohingya language	Indo-Aryan languages	Islam	3,600,000	Asia	Myanmar	Rohang State	Rohingya conflict Rohingya genocide	The Rohingyas are not recognized as a native ethnic group by Burmese government.
Assyrians		Sureth, Turoyo, other Aramaic languages	Semitic languages	Christianity (Syriac Christianity)	3,300,000	Asia	Syria, Iraq, Iran and Turkey	Assyria, Beth Nahrain (Mesopotamia)	Assyrian nationalism, Assyrian independence movement	Historically occupied the Assyrian empire.
Bodos		Bodo	Sino-Tibetan languages	Hinduism, Christianity	3,250,000 (2002 estimate)	Asia	India	Assam (Bodoland Territorial Region)	Bodoland movement	Seek a separate state or homeland (Bodoland) within India. Some factions demand independence
Afrikaners		Afrikaans	Germanic languages	Christianity (mainly Protestantism)	3,180,000	Africa	South Africa and Namibia	Western Cape, Volkstaat	Afrikaner Nationalism, Freedom Front, Cape independence, Cape Independence Party	Afrikaners are historically an ethno-racial group (although some today deracialize the identity to include Afrikaans-speaking Coloured people). Demand autonomy or total secession from South Africa. Historically occupied the Dutch Cape colony but did expand elsewhere into the once independent Boer republics.
Naga peoples		Naga languages, Konyak languages, Nagamese creole	Sino-Tibetan languages	Christianity	3,150,000 (2002 estimate)	Asia	India	Nagaland	Naga National Council, Insurgency in Northeast India	Seeks greater regional autonomy or complete separatation from India.
Basques		Basque, French, Spanish	Language isolate	Christianity (Roman Catholicism)	3,000,000	Europe	France and Spain	Basque Country	Basque nationalism	See also Nationalisms and regionalisms of Spain.
Iraqi Turkmen people		Turkish language, Azerbaijani language	Oghuz languages	Islam	3,000,000	Asia	Iraq	Turkmeneli	Iraqi Turkmen Front	Not to be confused with Syrian Turkmen of Latakia or Central Asian Turkmens of Turkmenistan who share only their ethnonym.
Welsh people		Welsh, English	Celtic languages	Christianity (Protestantism, Catholic minority)	3,000,000	Europe	United Kingdom	Wales	Welsh independence, Welsh nationalism, Meibion Glyndŵr, Plaid Cymru	Regional autonomy in Wales. Historically occupied the independent kingdoms of Wales (Gwynedd, Powys, Dyfed, Seisyllwg, Morgannwg, and Gwent).
Galicians		Galician, Spanish	Romance languages	Christianity (Roman Catholicism)	2,800,000	Europe	Spain	Galicia	Galician nationalism and Galician Regionalism	See also Nationalisms and regionalisms of Spain. Historically occupied the Kingdom of Galicia.
Kachin people		Jingpo language	Sino-Tibetan languages	Christianity	2,750,000 (2002 estimate)	Asia	Myanmar, China	Kachin State	Kachin Independence Organization	
Meitei people		Meitei language	Sino-Tibetan languages	Hinduism	1,800,000	Asia	India	Imphal Valley, Manipur	UNLF, PLA, Insurgency in Manipur, Anglo-Manipur War	Historically occupied the Kingdom of Manipur.
Aragonese people		Aragonese, Spanish	Romance languages	Christianity (Roman Catholicism)	2,045,000 (2002 estimate)	Europe	Spain	Aragon	Aragonese nationalism	See also Nationalisms and regionalisms of Spain. Historically occupied the Kingdom of Aragon.
Chechens		Chechen language, Russian	Northeast Caucasian languages	Islam	2,000,000	Europe	Russia	Chechnya	Chechen insurgency, Chechen Republic of Ichkeria	Regional autonomy in Chechnya.
Friulians		Friulian	Romance languages	Catholicism	2,000,000 (est.)	Europe	Italy	Friuli	Friuli Movement	Friuli is an autonomous region of Italy, but there are also other views as to what status it should have. Friulians are a recognised minority ethnic group in Italy.
Asturians		Asturian, Spanish	Romance languages	Christianity (Roman Catholicism)	1,000,000	Europe	Spain and Portugal	Asturias	Asturian nationalism	See also Nationalisms and regionalisms of Spain.
Mapuche		Mapudungun	Araucanian languages	Christianity (Roman Catholicism)	1,755,000 (2002 estimate)	South America	Argentina and Chile	Wallmapu	Mapuche autonomous movement	
Sardinian people		Sardinian, Corso-Sardinian, Italian, Catalan, Ligurian	Romance languages	Christianity (Roman Catholicism)	1,661,521	Europe	Italy	Sardinia	Sardinian nationalism	National devolution, further autonomy or total secession from Italy. Sardinians are a recognised minority ethnic group in Italy.
Ryukyuans (Okinawans)		Ryukyuan, Japanese, Koniya Sign Language	Japonic languages, Koniya Sign Language	Buddhism	1,600,000	Asia	Japan	Ryukyu Islands	Ryukyu independence movement	Historically occupied the Ryukyu Kingdom.
Canarians		Canarian Spanish, Silbo Gomero	Romance languages	Christianity (Roman Catholicism)	1,733,679	Africa	Spain	Canary Islands	Canarian nationalism	See also Nationalisms and regionalisms of Spain.
Pa-O		Pa-O language	Sino-Tibetan languages	Buddhism	1,430,000 (2002 estimate)	Asia	Myanmar	Shan State	Pa-O National Organization; Pa-O National Liberation Organization	
Oron		Lower Cross River languages, English	Benue–Congo languages	Christianity, Oro Religion	1,407,000	Africa	Nigeria, Cameroon	Bakassi	Bakassi Movement for Self-Determination	
Palaung (Ta'ang)		Palaung language	Austroasiatic languages	Buddhism	1,300,000 (2002 estimate)	Asia	Myanmar	Shan State	Palaung State Liberation Front	
Tuareg people		Tuareg language	Berber languages	Islam	1,200,000	Africa	Mali and Niger	Azawad	National Movement for the Liberation of Azawad, Tuareg rebellion (2012), Northern Mali conflict	National devolution, further autonomy or total secession from Mali.
Frisians		Frisian, Stadsfries Dutch, Dutch, German, Danish	Germanic Languages	Christianity (mainly Protestantism)	1,125,000	Europe	Netherlands, Denmark, and Germany	Frisia	Frisian National Party, Groep fan Auwerk	The creation of a new Frisian state. Historically occupied the Frisian Kingdom.
Jumma people		Languages of the Chittagong Hill Tracts, Bengali, Chittagonian	Sino-Tibetan languages, Indo-Aryan languages	Buddhism, Christianity, Islam	920,248	Asia	Bangladesh	Chittagong Hill Tracts	Jumma Nationalism, Parbatya Chattagram Jana Samhati Samiti, Shanti Bahini	Jumma is a term used to refer to the indigenous peoples of the Chittagong Hill Tracts, such as the Chakma, Marma, Tripura, Rakhine, etc. These communities seek autonomy, with some even advocating for independence.
Lezgins		Lezgian	Northeast Caucasian languages	Islam	800,000	Europe	Russia, Azerbaijan	Lezgistan	Lezgin Nationalism	Unification of the Lezgin people in Azerbaijan and Dagestan (Russia).
Fur people		Fur, Arabic	Nilo-Saharan languages	Islam	756,000 (2002 estimate)	Africa	Sudan	Darfur	War in Darfur, SLM/A	Historically occupied the Sultanate of Darfur.
Karenni (Kayah)		Karenni language	Sino-Tibetan languages	Buddhism, Christianity	755,000 (2002 estimate)	Asia	Myanmar	Kayah State	Karenni State Interim Executive Council	
Māori people		Māori, English	Austronesian languages	Christianity with native	750,000	Oceania	New Zealand	New Zealand	Māori protest movement	
Lahu		Lahu language	Sino-Tibetan languages	Animism, Buddhism, Christianity	680,000 (2002 estimate)	Asia	China, Myanmar, Thailand	Yunnan province		
Macanese people		Macanese Patois, Macanese Cantonese, Macanese Portuguese	Portuguese creole, Sino-Tibetan languages, Romance languages	Chinese folk religion, Taoism, Buddhism, Christianity (Roman Catholicism and Protestantism)	678,800	Asia	China	Macau	Macau independence movement	Limited autonomy in the Macau Special Administrative Region.
Chams		Cham language	Austronesian languages	Islam, Hinduism, Buddhism	650,000 (2002 estimate)	Asia	Vietnam, Cambodia	South Central Coast, Mondulkiri province	United Front for the Liberation of Oppressed Races, Cham rights movement	Historically occupied the Kingdom of Champa. The Cham in Vietnam are only recognized as a minority, and not as an indigenous people by the Vietnamese government their indigeneity to the region.
Karakalpaks		Karakalpak language	Turkic languages	Islam	623,000 (2002 estimate)	Asia	Uzbekistan	Karakalpakstan	Karakalpak Nationalism	Regional autonomy in Karakalpakstan.
Silesians		Silesian language (presumably, 2021 Polish census says about 467,145 people speaking Silesian, including 54,957 as the only language)	West Slavic languages	Roman Catholicism (predominant religion in Poland)	596,224 (counting Polish part only, 2021 census)	Europe	Poland, Germany, Czech Republic	Silesia	Silesian Autonomy Movement (not exactly irredentism but seeking only an autonomy)	Duchies of Silesia were existent in the past.
Ogoni people		Ogoni language	Volta–Congo languages	Christianity with native	560,000 (2002 estimate)	Africa	Nigeria	Ogoniland	Movement for the Survival of the Ogoni People	
Hawaiian people		Hawaiian language, Hawaiian Sign Language, English	Austronesian languages	Christianity (Catholicism and Protestantism) with native	527,000	Oceania	United States	Hawaii	Hawaiian sovereignty movement	Historically occupied the Kingdom of Hawaii.
Moravians		Czech (Moravian), Slovak	Slavic languages	Traditionally Roman Catholicism presently Irreligion	525,000	Europe	Czech Republic and Slovakia	Moravia	Moravians	Historically occupied Great Moravia.
Crimean Tatars		Crimean Tatar, Russian, Ukrainian	Turkic languages	Islam	500,000-600,000	Europe	Ukraine	Crimea	Crimean People's Republic Mejlis of the Crimean Tatar People Tatars in Republic of Crimea Deportation of the Crimean Tatars	Briefly managed to get independence in the 1910s as the Crimean People's Republic. After Ukrainian independence in 1991, Crimea became an autonomous republic within Ukraine, after being invaded and annexed by Russia in 2014. The Crimean Tatars began seeking autonomy.
Sahrawi people		Hassaniya Arabic (native), Berber languages (native), Modern Standard Arabic (written only), and Spanish (lingua franca)	Semitic languages	Islam (Sunni Islam (Maliki), Sufism)	500,000	Africa	Morocco, Algeria, Mauritania	Western Sahara	Western Sahara conflict, Polisario Front, Sahrawi Arab Democratic Republic	Partially controlled by the self-proclaimed Sahrawi Arab Democratic Republic and partially occupied by Morocco.
Corsican people		Corsican, French, Ligurian, Italian	Romance languages	Christianity (Roman Catholicism)	322,120	Europe	France	Corsica	Corsica Libera	Territorial collectivity in France.
Navajo		Navajo language, Navajo Sign Language, English	Na-Dene languages	Navajo Traditional, Christianity (principally Roman Catholicism)	305,000 (2002 estimate)	North America	United States	Navajo Nation	Navajo Wars	Regional autonomy on the Navajo Nation.
Bangladeshi Biharis		Urdu, Bengali, Languages of Bihar	Indo-Aryan languages	Islam	300,000	Asia	Bangladesh	Originally Bihar; Saidpur, Old Dhaka and Mohammadpur Thana (mostly)	Persecution of Biharis in Bangladesh	The Urdu-speaking Biharis of Bangladesh, also known as "Stranded Pakistanis", are Muslims from Bihar who settled in what is now Bangladesh in 1947. Many of them seek recognition and autonomy.
Inuit		Inuit languages, Danish, English, Russian	Eskaleut languages	Christianity with native	155,792	North America	Canada, Denmark, United States	Greenland, Inuit Nunangat, Far North Alaska	Greenlandic independence	Semi-autonomous rule in Greenland with autonomy within the Kingdom of Denmark.
Cornish people		Cornish, English (Cornish dialect)	Celtic languages	Christianity	100,000	Europe	United Kingdom	Cornwall	Cornish nationalism, Mebyon Kernow	Recognized as a national minority within the United Kingdom. Cornwall is currently a county within England in the UK. Groups mainly advocate for the recognition of Cornwall as a country separate from England, but still within the UK.
Scanians		Scanian dialect, Swedish, Danish	Germanic languages	Christianity (principally Lutheranism	100,000	Europe	Sweden	Skåneland	Skånepartiet	Was an autonomous part of Denmark until 1658 when it became part of Sweden after the treaty of Roskilde.
Sami people		Sami languages, Norwegian, Swedish, Finnish, Russian	Uralic languages	Christianity (principally Lutheran), Animism	80,000 (est.)	Europe	Finland, Norway, Russia and Sweden	Sapmi	Sámi politics	Have their own Parliaments in Norway, Sweden, and Finland but Sami groups usually seek more territorial autonomy.
Faroese people		Faroese, Danish	Germanic languages	Christianity (principally Lutheran)	66,000	Europe	Denmark	Faroe Islands	Faroese independence movement	Regional autonomy in Faroe Islands.
Sorbs		Sorbian language, German	Slavic languages	Christianity (Roman Catholicism)	60,000–70,000 (est.)	Europe	Germany	Lusatia	Domowina	Divided into Upper Sorbs and Lower Sorbs.
Ladin people		Ladin language	Romance languages	Christianity (Catholic Church)	36,000 (2002 estimate)	Europe	Italy	Ladinia		Recognised ethnic minority in Italy.

== See also ==
- Free Nations of Post-Russia Forum
- Diaspora
- Ethnic nationalism
- European Charter for Regional or Minority Languages
- Framework Convention for the Protection of National Minorities
- List of active autonomist and secessionist movements
- List of federally recognized tribes
- List of First Nations peoples
- List of organizations that self-identify as Native American tribes
- Local ethnic nationalism (China)
- Minzu (anthropology)
- Montagnard (Vietnam)
- Multinational state
- Non-FIFA international football
- Self-determination
- Sovereignty
- Stateless person
- Stateless society
- Unrepresented Nations and Peoples Organization

== Sources ==
- Keating, Michael (2001), Nations Against the State: The New Politics of Nationalism in Quebec, Catalonia and Scotland (Second ed.), Palgrave
- Levinson, David, ed. (1998), Ethnic Groups Worldwide: A Ready Reference Handbook, Phoenix, AZ: The Oryx Press, ISBN 978-1-57356-019-1
- Minahan, James, ed. (2002), Encyclopedia of the Stateless Nations: Ethnic and National Groups Around the World, Westport: Greenwood Press, ISBN 978-0-313-31617-3, archived from the original on 3 August 2010
- Bodlore-Penlaez, Mikael, ed. (2011), Atlas of Stateless Nations in Europe, minority peoples in search of recognition, Ceredigion: Y Lolfa, ISBN 978-1-84771-379-7
- Duany, Jorge (2008). "Nation on the move: the construction of cultural identities in Puerto Rico and the diaspora". American Ethnologist. 27 (1). Wiley: 5–30. doi:10.1525/ae.2000.27.1.5. ISSN 0094-0496.
