= Inner Mongolian independence movement =

Independence movement in China

Territories within a Greater Mongolia.

The flag of South Mongolia,"Holy Blue Sky"

The Inner Mongolian independence movement (Chinese: 内蒙古独立运动), also known as the Southern Mongolian independence movement (Chinese: 南蒙古独立运动), is a movement for the independence of Inner Mongolia (also known as Southern Mongolia) and the political separation of Inner Mongolia from the People's Republic of China. It is part of an Inner Mongolian nationalist movement.

Demchugdongrub was a key figure in the Inner Mongolian independence movement.

Historically, the movement began in earnest with the establishment of the Inner Mongolian People's Revolutionary Party (IMPRP) in 1925. The IMPRP was subjected to repeated waves of repression, and in 1997 its successor organization, the Inner Mongolian People's Party (IMPP), was established in the United States. The first Chairman of the IMPP was Temtsiltu Shobtsood, and its current leader is Khereid Khuvisgalt.

Temtselt Shovchuud (Temtsiltu Shobtsood) later abandoned the party's long-standing goal of an independent Inner Mongolia and independently advanced the so-called "Dual Ownership Theory," arguing that Inner Mongolia belongs jointly to both the Mongolian and Chinese peoples. As a result, he was removed from his position as Chairman of the Inner Mongolian People's Party and expelled from the party.

Since then, Temtselt Shovchuud has alternated between advocating for the independence of Inner Mongolia and later withdrawing that position. He currently serves as Chairman of the South Mongolia Congress, a coalition representing the non-mainstream wing of the Inner Mongolian independence movement. Olhunud Daichin, the former leader of the Mongolian Liberal Union Party, has joined this organization led by Temtselt Shovchuud.

On October 1, 2025, the Inner Mongolian People's Party held the International Conference Commemorating the 100th Anniversary of the Inner Mongolian People's Party at the Members' Office Building of the House of Councillors of Japan. At the conference, the party adopted a resolution reaffirming that the independence of Inner Mongolia remains its unwavering and fundamental objective.

Meanwhile, within China, the Southern Mongolian Democratic Alliance, led by Hada, was once active in advocating for the rights of Southern Mongolians. However, since Hada was unjustly arrested by the Chinese government in 1995, the organization has carried out little visible activity.

The stated goals of all three organizations are the secession of Inner Mongolia from the People's Republic of China, and either the establishment of an independent Inner Mongolian state or the unification of Inner Mongolia with "Outer Mongolia", i.e. the State of Mongolia.

The Chinese government asserts that there is active Inner Mongolian separatism, and the 2020 Inner Mongolia protests and a few other specific examples have been noted.

In 2018, Chinese state media outlet Economic Daily reported that a man surnamed Jiang was the first in Inner Mongolia to be sentenced on charges of terrorism in the region, although it was not specified what cause he was supporting.

== See also ==
- Mengjiang
- Pan-Mongolism
- List of active separatist movements in Asia
- Secession in China
- Separatist movements of China
- Affirmative action in China
- Human rights of ethnic minorities in China
