= Govruud Huuchinhuu =

Chinese dissident (d. 2016)

Govruud Huuchinhuu (Mongolian: Говрууд Хуучинхуу) was a dissident writer and human rights-activist from Inner Mongolia. In January 2011, Huuchinhuu disappeared after leaving a Tongliao hospital in Inner Mongolia. After 2 years of enforced disappearance by the Chinese government, she was placed under house arrest. She died of cancer on 25 October 2016, still under round-the-clock monitoring until her last breath.

== Career ==
=== Writing ===
Huuchinhuu is known for authoring Elm with Stone Heart, a collection of essays and short stories with a central theme around the South Mongolian identity. This book is banned in the People's Republic of China, but it has been published in Ulaanbaatar, and is available in Mongolia. The book was also transcribed to Cyrillic to reach a wider readership in the independent Mongolia, where the Mongolian script was banned for decades until the 1990s. Huuchinhuu's other books Silent Stone and Journey, have also been banned in China.

==== Confiscation ====
In the summer of 2007, Huuchinhuu was planning on publishing her book Elm with Stone Heart in Liaoning province. However, Fuxin County's Bureau of State Security prevented the book's publication.

Huuchinhuu's published Silent Rock in October 2007, even with being rejected of publication and without permission. Huuchinhuu stored copies of her book at her niece's and co-worker's homes, to prevent confiscation. After publication, police arrested Huuchinhuu's niece and confiscated all copies of Huuchinhuu's book.

=== Activism ===
Huunchinhuu is a member of the Southern Mongolian Democratic Alliance (SDMA), and was active in the 1981 Mongolian student movement. Huunchinhuu advocates for the human rights of Mongolians in China through the Internet. Three of the forums she operated were shut down by the Chinese government, after accusing her of discussing about separatism and issues in ethnicity without permission.

== Suppression ==
Throughout her career, Huuchinhuu has been taken into custody on multiple occasions. During these detainments, the Ministry of Public Security has tried to force Huuchinhuu to relinquish her SDMA membership, which Huuchinhuu has refused to do so. In 2007, Huuchinhuu was given a five year ban from traveling overseas after being deemed a possible threat to China.

=== House arrest ===
Hunnchinhuu had been campaigning via the Internet for the release of SDMA's co-founder Hada, who had been in prison since 1995. Huuchinhuu was placed under house arrest in November 2010 by the Government of the People's Republic of China for assembling Mongols on the internet for an early celebration of Hada's scheduled release.

=== Disappearance ===
Huuchinhuu was forced to disappear on January 27, 2011, after her releasement from a hospital in Tongliao where she had been treated for cancer. The case of Huuchinhuu and Hada had become a source of motivation for ethnic Mongolians worldwide, to bring more attention to the human rights abuses in Southern Mongolia. On March 19, 2012, a worldwide campaign to gather signatures to petition the release of Huuchinhuu and Hada was started in Ulaanbaatar by activists.

=== Trial ===
In November 2012, the Tongliao Municipality People’s Court found Huuchinhuu guilty of leaking state secrets at a closed-door trial. Her sentence was delayed in contradiction to Article 111 of China's Criminal Law, which states that leaking state secrets is a crime with a sentence ranging from five years to life sentence. Huuchinhuu appealed her guilty verdict and was placed under house arrest again. As of January 2015, Huuchimhuu remained under house arrest.

=== Criticism ===
In 2015 Huuchinhuu released two statements to the Southern Mongolian Human Rights Information Center (SMHRIC). One of her statements disclosed that the Tongliao Municipality Public Security Bureau froze her bank account, and violated her human rights.

== Accolades ==
In 2012, Huuchinhuu was awarded the Hellmann/Hammett grant by the Human Rights Watch organization for promoting freedom of speech.
