= Cantonese nationalism =

Notion that the Cantonese are a nation

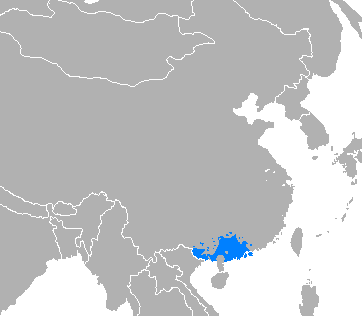
Extent of Yue Chinese (blue) in China

Guangdong province (red)

Cantonese nationalism is the notion that the Cantonese people are a distinct nation with their own unique culture, history and identity, and should therefore have an independent or autonomous homeland based on the provincial borders of Guangdong or the extent of Cantonese-speaking areas.

In the late 19th century and early 20th century, many individuals have proposed this idea, including Au Ku-kap, a disciple of Kang Youwei (who Au later fell out with due to differences in opinions). Au proposed the idea of establishing "a Guangdong people's Guangdong" in his work New Canton. In contemporary times, there are also fringe groups advocating for "Cantonia independence," which mostly comes from the internet. Some individuals overseas have displayed flags or slogans representing the movement during demonstrations against the Chinese authorities, even taking action within China itself.

== History ==
=== Late Qing-dynasty ===
==== Liangguang independence ====
In early June 1900, Li Hongzhang contacted Sun Yat-sen through his confidential staff, Cantonese gentry Liu Xuexun, hoping to invite Sun to Guangzhou to discuss cooperation matters. Liu was also very enthusiastic about this plan. Later, Liu asked Sun through telegraph: "Due to the boxer chaos in the north, now I would like to achieve the independence of Guangdong, and for this I would like sir to come and help. Please come to Canton as soon as possible." Sun was focusing on launching the Huizhou uprising at the time. His attitude towards this was opportunistic, thinking that he might as well make use of it: "This move has a chance of success and will be a blessing to the overall situation, so it is worth giving it a try.". After June 15, the Qing government repeatedly ordered Li Hongzhang to take up his post in Beijing. Li Hongzhang was on the fence and made excuses to delay.

According to Feng Ziyou's account, in the fifth month of the Gengzi period, Kai Ho "saw the urgent situation and the disaster of partition was imminent. If Canton did not urgently seek self-protection, it would never be able to survive. He proposed suggestions to China Daily (Hong Kong) President Chen Shaobai and advocated that revolutionaries should cooperate with Li Hongzhang, the Viceroy of Guangdong, to save the country. First, he mobilized Li to declare the independence of Canton to the Qing government and other countries, and the Prime Minister shall led the members of Revive China Society to assist... Then Blake, based on the reasons in the book, turned to Hongzhang, proposed an independent plan for Canton, and introduced Sun, the leader of the Revive China Society, to cooperate with him. If Hongzhang agreed with this, he would send a telegram to invite the Prime Minister to return to China and form a new government."

Kai Ho's role is to win the support of Sir Henry Arthur Blake (then Hong Kong Governor). Ho first discussed with some members of the Revive China Society the plan to transform China after the independence of Liangguang, which resulted in the "Letter from the Patriots of South China to the Governor of Hong Kong" that was then translated into English by Ho and handed over to Blake. Drafted by Ho, the program known as the "Pingzhi Charter" supports the reorganization of China's political system under the trusteeship of the western imperialist powers. It includes "moving the capital to a suitable place such as Nanjing and Hankou" and "establishing an autonomous government in each province", "separate management based on qualifications", westernize the judicial and educational systems, open the Chinese market to foreign businessmen, and establish a parliamentary system:

A provincial council shall be established, with a number of tributes from each county as members. The province shall have full power to manage all its issues of politics, expropriation and official supplies, and is not subject to remote control by the central government. However, a certain percentage of the money received throughout the year shall be transferred to the central government; this is to clear foreign debts, provide military salaries, and pay for the palace and the government. The militia and police headquarters in the province are all under the control of the autonomous government. The province shall appoint locals as its provincial officials and they must be publicly elected by the provincial assembly. As for the representatives in the council, they were supposed to be voted by the people; however, at the beginning of the new constitution, the law was not fully prepared, so they were temporarily selected by the autonomous government. They would be elected by the people in a few years, with the current consuls general of each country as temporary advisory members.

— Kai Ho, Pingzhi Charter

On June 11, Sun Yat-sen, Yang Quyun, Zheng Shiliang, Miyazaki Torazo and others set out from Yokohama and arrived at the sea of Hong Kong on the 17th, where they met the warship sent by Li Hongzhang to greet him. Worried that this was a trap set by the Qing government to arrest him, Sun did not dare to board the ship, so he sent Miyazaki and other three Japanese (who then had extraterritorial rights) to attend the meeting on his behalf. At about 10 o'clock that night, Miyazaki and others arrived at Liu Xuexun's residence in Guangzhou, and the two sides began their secret negotiations. During the negotiations, Liu Xuexun said that Li Hongzhang "would not be able to express anything" before the imperialist powers captured Beijing, implying that independence would have to wait until Beijing changed hands. Miyazaki proposed that Li Hongzhang should ensure Sun's safety and lend 60,000 yuan to the Revive China Society as the basis for cooperation between the two parties. Liu Xuexun immediately asked Li Hongzhang for instructions and agreed, and paid 30,000 yuan in person. At 3 o'clock in the morning the next day, the five-hour secret negotiation ended. Miyazaki and others immediately returned to Hong Kong overnight. Sun also set off on the same day, heading to Singapore via Hanoi.

However, as the war situation worsened, the voices of the peace faction in the Qing court became more prevalent, and Li Hongzhang received another telegram from the Qing court on July 8. Cixi appointed Li Hongzhang as the Viceroy of Zhili and Beiyang Trade Minister. Li Hongzhang realized that the government might begin to develop in a direction that was beneficial to the peace faction, so he decided to change his decision and leave Canton for the north. Before leaving, he first arrived in Hong Kong by boat from Guangzhou to pay a visit to Blake and expressed his stance to the Hong Kong government in person. However, Blake still haven't give up at this point and also learned that Sun Yat-sen was setting off from Singapore to Hong Kong. He sent an urgent telegram to London:

The American admiral has been asked by Li Hung-chang to take him north ... I have informed the American admiral of the desire of H.M. Government that Li Hung-chang should remain in Canton for the present ... The American admiral has delayed taking any action. Li’s presence in the South is very necessary.

— Blake

During the conversation, Blake said to Li Hongzhang: "I think that having regard to the present state of the North, such a movement is very probable and that we ought to be prepared and to look after our interests", and expressed that Li should become the leader of the independent Liangguang while Sun Yat-sen should be only an advisor. Li did not respond. At this time, Legislative Council member Wei Yu met with Blake and requested the Hong Kong government to use force to retain Li Hongzhang. However, British Foreign Minister Joseph Chamberlain repeatedly ordered that Blake be prohibited from taking any action, so the plan for an independent South China eventually fell through.

After the failure of the plans for Liangguang's independence, Kai Ho continued to lobby the British in Hong Kong about his ideas and plans to transform the Chinese dynasty. On July 21, Kai Ho reported that Blake supported the establishment of a republic in South China. On August 1, He published an article based on this political program in The China Mail. On August 10, he further published in the newspaper about the establishment of an "independent republic" in southern China. On August 22, Ho published an open letter summarizing his views in The China Mail using the pen name "Sinensis" and the title "An Open Letter on the Situation". The recipient of the letter is "Mr. John Bull":

Chinese of different provinces have their several distinctive characteristics, and in the distant future they are more likely to separate into distinct states than to unite into an immense nation.

— Kai Ho (as Sinesis)

Ho believed that China would eventually fall apart without the help of the great powers, and that helping China carry out reform and disintegration was a noble but arduous undertaking, so he hoped to get support from the British. He said: "many of her intelligent and gifted sons are most enthusiastic over it.”. Some scholars believe that this is precisely another aspect that many previous studies on Kai Ho have ignored.

==== "Canton Independence Association" ====
The Qing court signed several unequal treaties, ceding territories and paying indemnities after multiple foreign wars. In the spring of 1901, rumors circulated that the Qing court would cede Guangdong to France. Responding to this, Feng Sizhuan, Zheng Guanyi, Li Zizhong, Wang Chonghui, Feng Ziyou and Liang Zhongyou, among other Cantonese students in Japan, initiated an organization called the Canton Independence Association. They advocated for Guangdong to declare independence from the Qing court, emphasizing that Guangdong belonged to its people, and its fate should be decided by them, not the Qing government. The call resonated with many Cantonese expatriates in Japan, with "over two hundred participants" joining. The founders also visited Sun Yat-sen in Yokohama to discuss strategies. This marked the beginning of the cooperation between the Guangdong students in Japan and the Revive China Society. Although not purely a student organization, it was led primarily by students. Since it was started because of rumors about Guangdong's cession and it was also mainly a club for people who came from the same area, it ceased operations shortly after its establishment.

==== Au Ku-kap and "New Canton" ====
After the defeat in the First Sino-Japanese War, the Qing court was forced to sign the Treaty of Shimonoseki in April of that year, ceding Taiwan and its surrounding islands to Japan. This move faced strong opposition from the locals of Taiwan. As a result, some Taiwanese elites urged the former viceroy of Taiwan, Tang Jingsong, to declare independence on May 25 of the same year. Thus, one of Asia's first self-proclaimed democratic states was established, named the Republic of Formosa. Although the Republic of Formosa existed only briefly, it inspired later claims for provincial independence and had a significant impact.

Au Ku-kap explained his title and proposition in the work:

People will not put forward as much courage when dealing with public affairs as when dealing with their private affairs, they will not be as eager to save people they don't know as to save their own family and relatives, and they will not love China as much as their own provinces. This is the natural tendency, which rarely changes. For this reason and through my observations of the current trend, it is best for each province to take the initiative to chart its own course towards independence... I'm from Canton, thus I propose to begin this independence trend from Canton. Let us tentatively call this proposal "New Canton" to signify our desire as people from Canton to enjoy the blessings of a new nation.

— Au Ku-kap, New Canton

Au Ku-kap believes that "those who speak of self-reliance among the Chinese take Taiwan as the starting point," and considers publications like the Hunan Daily (1898) founded by Tan Sitong and Tang Caichang as "the beginning of the voice for independence of various provinces in China." In his writing, he lists four "traits of self-reliance" in Canton: "outstanding talent," "abundant financial resources," "control of key regions," and "population growth." He proposes three methods to achieve independence: "independent newspapers," "independent schools," and "secret societies" (utilizing underground party organizations). Au also believes that the three major ethnic groups in Canton, namely the locals (i.e. Cantonese people), the Hoklo (i.e. Min language speakers, mainly the Teochew people), and the Hakka, are all indispensable parts of the Canton community:

These three ethnic groups share the same origin, differing only in the language they speak... In terms of intellect, thoughts, perspectives, and physical and mental attributes, these three ethnicities are equally matched. Speaking in terms of their genealogy, all three of them are mostly descendants of their ancestors who migrated from the central plains due to upheavals, moving south across the mountains. The locals mostly migrated from Nanxiong to Guangzhou and Zhaoqing; the Hakka mostly migrated from Ganzhou; and the Hoklo mostly migrated from Jiangsu and Zhejiang to Fujian and Chaozhou. The variation in their dialects is also influenced by the regions where they reside... Hence, there is no doubt that these three are of the same ethnicity.

— Au Ku-kap, New Canton

Later in the article, Au Ku-Kap also further proposed the disintegration plan of the eighteen mainland provinces and the idea of establishing a federation between Guangdong and Guangxi:

The people of Guangxi originally migrated from eastern Guangdong, and since the territories are contiguous and the sentiments are deeply connected, forming a federation is the easiest thing to do here. This is a natural boundary in terms of geography and ethnicity. It's not just Guangdong and Guangxi; if we were to divide the territories governed by the current governor-general of China into separate countries, it would also be feasible since it matches in terms of ethnicity and geography. For example, under the governor-general of Zhili, the provinces of Zhili, Shandong, Shanxi, and Henan could form an independent country; under the governor-general of Liangjiang, Jiangsu, Anhui, and Jiangxi could form one; under the governor-general of Lianghu, Hubei and Hunan could form one; under the governor-general of Yungui, Yunnan and Guizhou; under the governor-general of Shaan-Gan, Shaanxi and Gansu; and under the governor-general of Min-Zhe, Zhejiang and Fujian (previously including Taiwan as three provinces, now ceded to Japan), each pair of provinces could form an independent country; and under the governor-general of Sichuan, Sichuan alone could be an independent country. If we compare this to the powerful countries in Europe (excluding Russia and excluding colonies), there is no one that can match the extent of their territory. Even if this is not possible, dividing them into three major parts based on the flow of rivers – provinces north to the Yellow River and east to the Yin Mountains could joint forces and form an independent country, provinces south to the Yellow River and north to the Yangtze River could form one, and provinces south to the Yangtze River and north to the Southern Sea could form one. These three new countries could be very powerful and countries as powerful are rarely seen of in modern times. Nevertheless, regardless of whether it's the South, the Central or the Northern, and regardless of whether the provinces are grouped together, if one province declares independence, it will naturally align with its respective region. If, due to differences in dialects, customs, and political systems, a northern province aligns with the central region, a central province aligns with the southern region, or a southern province aligns with the central region, as long as they can stand independently, they can choose their own direction.

— Au Ku-kap, New Canton

Au Ku-kap's article sparked widespread discussion and attention. This book also led to harsh criticism from Kang Youwei, who stated, "Ku-kap has deviated from the classics and should be expelled from the school." Kang also wrote to Au, saying, "Receiving your book, I was speechless and struck with a headache. You are pushing us to a dead end," and "The only choice is to sever ties with you and inform the world." Kang Youwei subsequently wrote several articles vehemently opposing Au's proposal for the provinces of the China proper to become independent, arguing that the downfall of India was due to the provinces' independence. In 1902, Han Wenju, writing under the pen name "Man Who's Worried," praised Au Ku-kap's theory of independence in the "Mianshi Tanhu Lu" column of Xinmin Congbao, believing that this was a method for the Chinese people in the mainland to achieve self-reliance, and advocating for people from all over China to join this movement:

As I read this, I was greatly convinced. I hope that the people of Chu will seek a new Chu, the people of Shu will seek a new Shu, the people of Wu will seek a new Wu, the people of Yue will seek a new Yue, and the people of Ou (Southern Zhejiang) will seek a new Ou, and even Yan, Qi, Qin, Jin, Dian, and Qian.

— Han Wenju: On New Canton

In 1903, a year after the publication of "New Canton", Yang Shouren, an anti-Qing figure from Changsha studying in Japan, followed Au Ku-kap's work and published an article titled "New Hunan" under the pen name "Hunan for the People of Hunan." Yang's arguments were deeply influenced by Au, also advocating the disintegration of mainland China. The article began with the statement: "The Pacific Gentleman wrote 'New Canton'; we the disgruntled people have read it and admired it." Yang proclaimed, "Canton advocates it, and we Hunan shall harmonize with it; Canton plays its music, and we Hunan shall dance to it; we Hunan to Canton is exactly like the straps on a chariot's horse." Yang even likened the disintegration of the Qing Empire to the collapse of the Roman Empire and compared the independence of Hunan to the construction of European nation-states.

On May 8, 1905, the Qing Dynasty's Grand Council sent letters to provincial governors ordering the strict prohibition of "rebellious" publications including "New Canton", "New Hunan", and "Xinmin Congbao", which all advocated for reform or revolution. Feng Ziyou also mentioned in his memoir Revolutionary Anecdotes that "New Hunan" vigorously advocated for the independence of Hunan Province from the Qing Dynasty, similar to "New Canton" written by the Cantonese Au Ku-kap, which was widely circulated at that time. It is worth noting that Chen Jiongming later proposed the idea of "provincial autonomy," which was greatly inspired by Au's ideas.

In 1908, Au Ku-kap, who had already broken ties with Kang Youwei, along with Liu Shiji and others, hoped to invest in industry in Guangxi and other areas. When Au went to New York to raise funds for his Zhenhua Company, he told people that "Our current investment in Zhenhua stocks is only to pave the way for future control of the Liangguang. I have been planning this for more than ten years. If Zhenhua and Guangmei companies succeed, my goal can be achieved." In 1909, conflicts between Kang Youwei's faction and Au Ku-kap's group intensified. Several people, including Liu Shiji, were assassinated. Au had to "move around with bodyguards" and lived in constant fear. However, Kang Youwei took the initiative and reported that Au was plotting unrest and advocating for the independence of Liangguang, secretly planning a revolution. Kang accused Au in his report of "pretending to be loyal to the party, attempting to deceive people's hearts, and then betraying the party's purpose, which was severely criticized by the party leader and not tolerated. He is a man who would cunningly change his stance", "plotting unrest, mobilizing forces in the three provinces of Guangdong, Yunnan, and Guizhou, and purchasing weapons and ammunition which cannot be achieved without raising tens of thousands of funds through stock offerings", "plotting to seize power", "using the power of the governor to coerce merchants and seize their assets, making use of Guangxi's remote location for planning unrest, and intending to establish independence in Guangxi, Guangdong, Yunnan, and Guizhou".

=== After Xinhai Revolution ===
After the 1911 Wuchang Uprising in Hubei, various sectors in Canton "planned for Canton's self-preservation." On November 9, the Canton Consultative Bureau announced Canton's independence from the Qing Dynasty. The gentry class in Canton had their first taste of modern political participation during the late Qing Dynasty's Advisory Council reforms. For them, the Xinhai Revolution was an opportunity to lead the practice of Canton's independence and autonomy. Liu Yongfu, who became the head of the Canton Militia after its independence, stated in a public announcement for calming the public:

We Canton borders Hokkien to the east, Kwangsi to the west, Wuling to the north, and the ocean to the south. Our customs, language and preferrences are different from those of the Central Plains, so it is natural for us to be an independent country. Zhao Tuo of the Qin Dynasty, Feng Ang and Deng Wenjin of the Sui Dynasty, and He Zhen of the Yuan Dynasty all took advantage of the turbulent times to rise up, stabilize the society, and consolidate the territory. Now that the army is strong and the situation of independence is complete, there are more than ten thousand ways to plan for the good of the future! ... "Canton shall be the Canton for the people of Canton", this kind of words should already be familiar to you.

— Liu Yongfu, Announcement on the Inauguration of the Leader of Canton Militia (《就任广东省民团总长通告》)

However, some people also pointed out that Canton's independence in 1911 was just a step for local gentry to break away from the Qing Empire; they still greatly desired to join the yet-to-be-established Republic of China regime. The republican faction in late Qing Canton had a dual loyalty to "China" and "Canton." For instance, there were those who, in articles celebrating independence, distinguished this independence from the founding of the United States, the independence of Greece, and the establishment of the Southern Han state and the He Zhen regime in Canton's history:

Independence must have its purpose. Washington's soaring in America, I do not pursue that, since I do not desire to separate from the mother country; the vigorous efforts of Kapodistrias in the Balkans, I do not pursue that either, since I still wish to restore the old capital. But Canton's purpose is already set, hence this is not like the independence of the United States or Greece, but it's simply the independence of Canton.

Independence must have its organization. The establishment of Liu Yan's country in Canton, I do not pursue that, since I do not aim for a separatist hegemony; the preservation of the land by Hezhen in Canton, I do not pursue that either, since I do not wish to cling to the Qing system. But now that Canton's organization is complete, it is not for the independence of old Canton, but for the independence of present-day Canton."

— 《興漢紀念廣東獨立全案 —— 廣東獨立記》 (Comprehensive Record of Canton Independence in Memory of the Rise of Han: Canton Independence Records)。

==== Influence of the "federated provincial autonomy" ideology ====
At that time, Chen Jiongming, who was in power in Canton, also supported this type of political system and promoted the drafting of the Draft Constitution of Canton Province by the Canton Assembly. It stipulated Canton's independence and autonomy in military and financial matters, as well as its relationship with the Republic of China. Meanwhile, under the influence of the trend of provincial autonomy, Chen's administration in Canton initiated the first-ever county magistrate elections in Chinese history. In September 1921, the election of county councilors across the province was completed, and in November, the election of county magistrates was also completed. In an issue of the magazine La Jeunesse, a reader wrote a letter expressing great encouragement for the elections in Guangdong and advocated that Canton should no longer seek actions for "unifying China" but instead "become a model new country in the world":

As for Canton, the last thing I want from it is any further action to unify China – it is just a waste of effort and will result in our people falling deeper into hell. The trend of evolution – no matter what kind of evolution – is to move from a confusing so-called "unity" to smaller "unities" that are more complete and promising. I feel that there are so many enthusiastic people overly confused by words like "thoroughness", "sacrifice" and "struggle" that they have accomplished nothing, and I only hope that Canton will become a model new country in the world. ...With the area and population of, Canton is enough to qualify as a country. Otherwise, I am afraid that external attacks and internal criticism will completely wipe out any promising shoots and roots, which will make realization in the future extremely difficult. A single bit of fire that's lit to shine brightly in the darkness is easy to extinguish, but when you are in a position where you can shine and cause other things to burn, you will naturally work hard to spit out flames and illuminate everything! People like Sun, Chen, and others are like this powerful fire within Canton; and when Canton burns red hot, other places would see that Canton is where the sun is from!

— La Jeunesse, Vol. 9, Issue 4.

Unlike Chen Jiongming, who advocated for the establishment of a provincial constitution in Canton and provincial autonomy, the Kuomintang, including Sun Yat-sen, believed that provincial autonomy and the establishment of provincial constitutions would only promote the fragmentation and disintegration of China, leading to regional independence or even the founding of separate countries. Sun Yat-sen argued, "Under current conditions in China, federalism will act as a centrifugal force. Ultimately, it will only lead to the division of our country into many small nations, where principle-less suspicion and hostility will determine their relationships." In the Manifesto of the First National Congress of the Kuomintang of China, Sun strongly opposed the advocates of provincial autonomy, arguing that its result would only "split China, allowing small warlords to occupy each province and pursue their own interests." After the enactment of the Canton Provincial Constitution, Liao Zhongkai, Zou Lu, and Gu Yingfen opposed and resisted it, viewing it as:

...was trying to divide China into 20-plus small countries. The provincial constitution itself is all about local divisions and there is no unified country. If the provinces followed this idea and declared autonomy, they will make their own plans and do their own things, and China will inevitably fall into pieces.

Hu Hanmin pointed out that "Chen Jiongming's drafting of the provincial constitution is purely based on the interests of the province. Apart from seeking to consolidate the province's military power and not being controlled by the central government, it even declares war externally. The 'national government' has only the right to command the provincial army and not the right to mobilize it. The organization of the provincial army and other matters are determined by provincial laws, concentrating military and political power in the hands of the provincial governor. On the surface, it appears to follow the system of separating civil and military officials, but in reality, it is simply trying to be an independent kingdom."

The disagreement between Chen Jiongming and the Kuomintang eventually led to the June 16th Incident. Subsequently, the Kuomintang and the Comintern engaged in large-scale cooperation, leading to the formation of First United Front. Later, the National Revolutionary Army launched the Eastward Expedition and defeated Chen Jiongming. Economist Xiaokai Yang believes that during the warlord era, if warlords could "form multiple small countries and establish an inviolable order of borders," then it would be "possible to create a situation of equal competition among multiple countries like in Europe." Yang argues that the local autonomy and federalist ideology represented by figures like Chen Jiongming represent the potential for China to develop towards a multi-state system. Dissident historian Liu Zhongjing believes that if the practice of inter-provincial autonomous constitutionalism had not been interfered with by the Northern Expedition of the Kuomintang and the Communist Party, it would eventually have slowly eroded the power of the central government of the Republic of China. The protection of different regional warlords by foreign powers would have effects similar to the disintegration of Spanish America. Liu also believes that during the Five Dynasties period in China, both Lingnan and Vietnam were held by the remnants of the Tang Dynasty's Jiedushi. Eventually, the Southern Han state was eliminated by the Song Dynasty while the Tĩnh Hải quân became a vassal of China, which is why these two regions later took different paths.

=== Modern times ===
==== National security issues ====
At the end of June 2020, China passed the Hong Kong National Security Law, which attracted global attention. In Hong Kong Police Force's operational guidelines for the law, examples of behavior endangering national security were mentioned, including demonstrators waving designated flags. Examples of flags listed by the police include the Guangdong Independence Flag that appeared in the 2019 New Year's Day parade. (Note: According to Apple Daily, the obtained action guidelines for the Hong Kong National Security Law mention examples of behaviors that endanger national security, including protesters waving specified flags or chanting certain slogans. The examples of flags listed by the police include the "Hong Kong Independence" flag, the blue and white "Hong Kong National Flag", the "Snow Lion" flag, and the "Nine Independences" flag. According to online information, "Nine Independences" refers to Shanghai, Inner Mongolia, Tibet, East Turkestan, Taiwan, Sichuan, Guangdong, Manchuria, and Fujian.)

==== Street slogan incidents ====
On March 12, 2018, media reported that various public facilities in Guangzhou were inscribed with slogans in Traditional Chinese characters. The slogans included phrases such as "Guangzhou Independence, Hong Kong Add Oil," "Canton Independence," and "Free Cantonia." In late August 2019, Guangzhou witnessed another incident of street graffiti with slogans advocating for Cantonia independence.

Arnaldo Gonçalves, a political scientist at the Macau Polytechnic Institute, while acknowledging that the people of Guangdong have their unique identity, also questions the consistency of this movement.

On October 13, 2022, a protest against Xi Jinping took place at Sitong Bridge in Beijing, triggering responses from people who opposed the CCP in China and abroad. On the 16th, a person who was said to be a member of the "Cantonia Independence Party" and advocated for Guangdong independence hung a banner with red characters on a white background that imitated the Sitong Bridge protesters outside the Los Angeles City Hall with slogans in Traditional Chinese Characters:

==== Kapok flag ====
The Kapok flag

Since its conception, it can be seen on multiple overseas protests against the CCP. As one of the "nine independence" flags, it was banned in Hong Kong after the implementation of the 2020 Hong Kong national security law.

== In popular culture ==
From 1902 to 1904, Au Ku-kap, under the pen name "New Canton Gentleman," published the reformist Cantonese opera script The Returning of Huang Xiaoyang (full title: "New Revised Version of The Returning of Huang Xiaoyang"). The drama prominently advocated the idea of Canton independence described in Au's New Canton and dramatized the independence strategy proposed by Au in the book. In the plot devised by Au, the protagonist Huang Zhongqiang is the reincarnation of Huang Xiaoyang, the leader of the peasant uprising in Guangdong during the Ming Dynasty. Au Ku-kap used the folk rhyme from Guangdong, "Nine cows float on the water, Xiaoyang is returning," "Big stones sink to the bottom, white geese float, thirty years later, Xiaoyang returns," to achieve the purpose of propaganda. The plot of this drama tells the story of Huang Zhongqiang leading the people to strive for Canton independence, and Huang Zhongqiang also advocates, "The future independence of Canton depends entirely on the people." Au even referred to the Philippines' struggle for independence at the time. In the script, Aguinaldo ultimately decided on the national policy of "We the Philippines shall support and protect the independence and autonomy of Canton."

The plot of Guangdong's independence is mentioned in two works of Japan's best-selling military novelist Ei Mori. In his military novel The New Japan-China War published from 1995 to 2003, Mori created a fictional plot in which China's internal power struggle led to regional conflicts after the death of Deng Xiaoping. Because of differences in attitudes toward Taiwan's independence under the lead of Lee Teng-hui, the Guangdong authorities declared independence. The Chinese Civil War thus broke out. In the military novel The New Japan-China War: The Century of Raging Waves which is set in the fictional 2020s, Guangdong also declared its independence in the later stages of the military conflict between China and Japan and the United States. At the end of both novels, the troops of the "Canton Republic" join the United States, Japan, and Taiwan in the war against China.

== Understandings from different parties ==
=== Chinese parties ===
The Chinese Historian Liu Zhongjing also advocated that China should be disintegrated into different nation-states (a political position called Cathaysianism) simplified Chinese: 诸夏主义; traditional Chinese: 諸夏主義; pinyin: Zhū Xià zhǔyì., and called Canton after independence "Cantonia". Some Canadian scholars who study contemporary social trends in China believe that Liu's admiration for "regionalism", including support for separatist activities in Hong Kong, Taiwan, Tibet and other places, is extremely dangerous to China's future. Some scholars who are pro-China's establishment severely criticized Liu Zhongjing's theory for advocating the split of China, calling Liu "a scum in an imposing attire". In addition, many overseas scholars jointly submitted a letter arguing that Liu's "Cathaysian theory" was historical nihilism, and the reason why China is China is that the unity of the Chinese nation overcame division during the formation process which undoubtedly established the Chinese history. They also claimed that Liu's theories are all based on assumptions instead of facts, and by fabricating more than 20 fictional countries such as "Cantonia" and "Yuyencia" out of thin air, his theory is no longer just academic research, but a theoretical weapon to overthrow state power. In addition, Dr. Li Junjie said in an interview that the stupidity of Liu Zhongjing's logic surpassed Gorbachev’s. “He dreamed of splitting China into 20 pieces, and even returned to the time when there were 800 princes 3,000 years ago. Isn't this kind of research result utterly ridiculous?”, and said that his theory is an unattainable and nihilistic fantasy and no country will accept it.

Tam Chi Keung, a Hong Kong pundit who was born in Macau, does not believe that Hong Kong independence is feasible, but Canton satisfies the conditions for independence. Tam reiterated Chen Jiongming's concept of provincial autonomy and argued that from a geographical point of view, Guangdong could be independent as long as the three mountain passes bordering Fujian and Hunan and the waterway in Zhaoqing were closed.

Hong Kong game developer, entrepreneur, and political commentator Cheng Laprecalled his experience while working in China. He had met many Chinese people who would privately discuss Canton independence, and described the statement "if our hometown had become independent" as something "very easy to hear (from Chinese people)". He also pointed out that people who discussed Canton independence with him often had divisive political views, for example, they would fiercely advocate attacking Taiwan. He described this kind of divisive thinking as confusing to him.

In 2016, protests broke out once again in Wukan village of Lufeng, Canton. Some localist commentators who advocate Hong Kong independence believe that people who support Hong Kong independence should also support "Canton independence", because if people who support a "Great Unified China" and sincerely believe that "Hong Kong people should support mainlanders" "truly wants to save Wukan, the only way to it is through Canton independence. If Hong Kong people want to help Canton become independent, they must first become independent themselves; if all the provinces could encumber the Communist criminals at the same time, it will be impossible for them to focus on one province or one region."

== See also ==
- Secession in China
