= Nutuge.com =

- Dissolved: March 2004
- Website: www.nutuge.com
- Current status: Shut down

Nutuge.com, was a Mongolian-language website that covered the history and modern development of the Mongols. The site was managed by Govruud Huuchinhuu. The site was shut down by the Chinese authorities in March 2004, for "posting separatist content" and "discussing ethnic problems".
