= Secession in China =

Overview of secessionist movements in the People's Republic of China

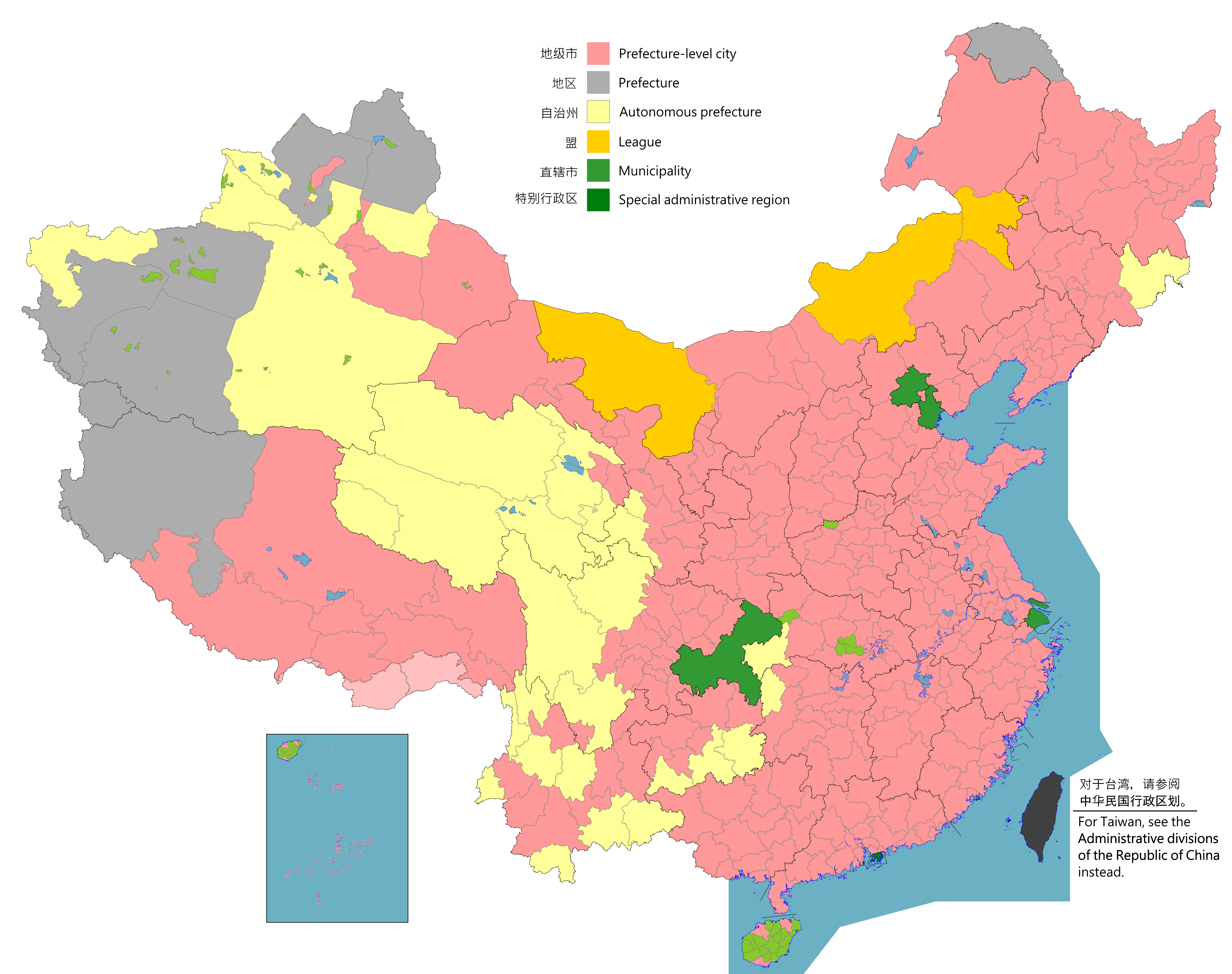
The People's Republic of China by prefectural-level divisions

Heihe–Tengchong Line

There are several secessionist movements in the People's Republic of China. (Note: Taiwan, the continuation of the original Republic of China, and is a state with limited recognition whose territory is claimed as China's 23rd province, is not included in this list because it has never been governed by the People's Republic of China, the government that was established in mainland China in 1949. For more information, see articles; political status of Taiwan and Taiwan independence movement.) Many current separatist movements in China arise from racism and other issues. Some of the factors that have created these ethnic issues include history, nationalism, economic and political disparity, religion, and other factors. China has historically had tensions between the majority Han and other minority ethnic groups, particularly in rural and border regions. Historically, other ruling ethnicities, such as the Manchu of the early-Qing dynasty, experienced ethnic issues as well.

== Legal basis ==
=== Republic of China ===
Kuomintang leader Sun Yat-sen issued a statement calling for the right of self-determination of all Chinese ethnic groups at a party conference in 1924:

"The Kuomintang can state with solemnity that it recognizes the right of self-determination of all national minorities in China and it will organize a free and united Chinese republic."

=== People's Republic of China ===
The 1931 constitution of the Chinese Soviet Republic accepted secession as legal, with article 14 stating

"The Soviet government of China recognizes the right of self-determination of the national minorities in China, their right to complete separation from China, and to the formation of an independent state for each national minority."

Commenting on the 1931 constitution, Ben Hales on The Diplomat wrote, "[b]ut by 1949, when the CCP actually came to power, founding the PRC, reconstituting a strong, multinational polity over as much of the former Qing empire as possible became a priority."

== Secessionist movements ==
Proposed state	Current political status within the PRC	Main independence movement	Main ethnic group seeking independence	Map
East Turkestan	Autonomous region	East Turkestan independence movement	Uyghurs	
Guangdong	Province	Guangdong independence movement	Cantonese people	
Hong Kong	Special administrative region	Hong Kong independence movement	Hongkongers	
Inner Mongolia	Autonomous region	Inner Mongolian independence movement	Mongols	
Macau	Special administrative region	Macau independence movement	Macanese people	
Shanghai	Direct-administered municipality	Shanghai independence movement	Shanghainese people	
Tibet	Autonomous region	Tibetan independence movement	Tibetans	

=== Hong Kong ===
In 1997, the colony of Hong Kong was retroceded to China, leading to the creation of the Hong Kong Special Administrative Region. Under the jointly agreed upon Hong Kong Basic Law, the Hong Kong SAR would maintain its autonomy for 50 years until 2047, after which point, the region would assume full control by China. Hong Kong's autonomy, and its end in 2047, has created contention between those who support the Chinese government, and those who do not. A particular source of contention in recent years is with the structure of the Hong Kong government, where the Chief Executive is appointed by the Chinese government while local elections are held directly.

In 2019, the Hong Kong extradition bill was proposed, which sparked protests throughout Hong Kong. During the protests which followed, the pro-democracy camp gained general support alongside the Hong Kong independence movement to a small extent as well. Many of the anti-governmental groups supported localism and universal suffrage in all Hong Kong elections. In May 2020, the National People's Congress of China passed a decision concerning Hong Kong national security legislation, whereby "secession" and "subversion" were made illegal. This move has meant that pro-independence calls are now illegal by the new decision, although some still do call for independence despite the changes to the law. In Hong Kong, the pro-democracy camp enjoys general support, though the passing of the decision by the NPC has made protesting and the organization of protests more difficult.

=== Macau ===
The Macau independence movement is the political movement that advocates for the independence of Macau from China. Despite receiving little attention within Macau, the issue was raised in the Legislative Assembly of Macau following the Hong Kong Legislative Council oath-taking controversy. In 2017, several Chinese media outlets warned against discussion of Macau independence, fearing that speculation would lead to further action. The Swedish magazine The Perspective speculated that the relative lack of independence sentiment in Macau stems from the SAR's reliance on gaming and tourism revenue from the mainland. Macau is currently one of the richest regions in the world, and its wealth is derived almost entirely from gambling, which is illegal in mainland China.

=== Tibet ===
After the failed Tibetan uprising, some Tibetans followed the Dalai Lama into India, establishing a government-in-exile called the Central Tibetan Administration.

The movement is no longer supported by the 14th Dalai Lama who, although having advocated it from 1961 to the late 1970s, proposed a sort of high-level autonomy in a speech in Strasbourg in 1988, and has since then restricted his position to either autonomy for the Tibetan people in the Tibet Autonomous Region within China, or extending the area of the autonomy to include parts of neighboring Chinese provinces inhabited by Tibetans.

=== Xinjiang ===
Several armed insurgency groups are fighting the Chinese government in Xinjiang, namely, the Turkestan Islamic Party and the East Turkestan Liberation Organization, which some people consider to be associated with Al-Qaeda and the Islamic State.
