= Elm with Stone Heart =

Elm with Stone Heart (Mongolian (Traditional): ᠴᠢᠯᠠᠭᠣᠨ ᠵᠢᠷᠦᠬᠡ ᠲᠠᠢ ᠬᠠᠢᠢᠯᠠᠰᠦ | Mongolian (Cyrillic) Чулуун Зүрхтэй Хайлаас) is a book by Southern Mongolian human rights activist Huuchinhuu Govruud. It is a collection of the author's essays, short stories, and blog posts collected since 2000. The themes covered include the loss of the Mongolian identity in Southern Mongolia, deterioration of the Mongolian culture, and the frustration faced by Mongolians that choose to confront this issue.

Published in 2007, the book has been banned inside China. However, its copies published in Ulaanbaatar, Mongolia, is in circulation. It has also been transcribed into Cyrillic. (As the Mongolian script was banned in Mongolia since 1944 under Stalin's order, it has fallen into disuse in the subsequent decades until the end of 1980's, and the Russian-based Cyrillic alphabets were used instead.)
