= Southern Mongolian Democratic Alliance =

Separatist organisation in China

The Southern Mongolian Democratic Alliance (Chinese: 南蒙古民主联盟) was created in May 1992, by Hada and other Mongol activists including Tegexi. Its major goal is the self-determination of Inner Mongolia (an autonomous region of China).

== Historical background ==
In the 1980s, Temtselt Shobshuud (Chinese: Xi Haiming), Huchuntegus (Chinese: Hu Qing Te Gu Si), Wang Manglai (Chinese: Wang Man Lai) and Hada, all students at universities in Hohhot, discussed establishment of the Inner Mongolian People's Party (IMPP), a political party for Mongolians in Inner Mongolia. Later, individuals from eastern and western Inner Mongolia divided and therefore, Huchuntegus established the Ordos Association of Ethnic Culture at the Ikh Juu League (now the Ordos City). Hada established the Southern Mongolian Democratic Alliance. Xi Haiming fled his country and established the IMPP in New York, in March, 1997.

The Southern Mongolian Democratic Alliance organization was originally named "Mongolian Culture Rescue Committee" and Hada was elected chairman. In 1994, this group created a journal: Voice of Southern Mongolia, and in 1995 initiated a constitution outlining the Alliance's main mission as “opposing colonization by the Han people and striving for self-determination, freedom and democracy in Southern [Inner] Mongolia.” Voice of Southern Mongolia, was banned in 1995, and it is still banned nowadays.

== See also ==
- Inner Mongolian People's Party
- Inner Mongolia
- Outer Mongolia
- Mongolia
- Inner Mongolian independence movement
