= Hada (activist) =

Mongolian activist (born 1955)

Hada (Mongolian: ᠬᠠᠳᠠ, Mongolian Cyrillic: Хада; Chinese: 哈達; pinyin: Hādá, born November 29, 1955) is an ethnic Mongol activist, who has campaigned for self-determination of Southern Mongolia (the Inner Mongolia Autonomous Region of China). He was detained for 15 years in prison in Chifeng. He was released from prison on December 10, 2010, but still detained in an detention centre in Inner Mongolia. In December 2014 he was released from detention. Upon his release he was put on house arrest, which he continued to be in up until he suffered catastrophic organ failure in January 2025 and was rushed to the hospital. Since his release from the hospital his status has been unknown. Before being sent to the hospital, Hada was nominated for the 2025 Nobel Peace Prize by four Japanese Members of Parliament and two US Congressmen.

== Early life and education ==
Hada was born into a Mongolian family on November 29, 1955. In early 1981, while at university he joined the Inner Mongolian student movement, which was campaigning to preserve Mongolian identity in Inner Mongolia under Chinese law. Hada obtained his master's degree in philosophy in 1983, and published articles on political theory in Mongolian. He began research studies in the political theory department of Inner Mongolia Normal University in 1986. With his wife, Xinna, he opened a Mongolian studies bookstore in Hohhot, the capital of Inner Mongolia.

== Political activities and arrest ==
In the 1980s, Xi Haiming (Mongolian: Temtselt Shobshuud)^{a}, Huchuntegus^{b}, Wang Manlai^{c}, and Hada; all students at universities in Hohhot, discussed establishment of the Inner Mongolian People's Party, a political party for Mongolians in Inner Mongolia. In May 1992, Hada and other Mongol activists (including Tegexi) formed the Southern Mongolian Democratic Alliance (originally named as the Mongolian Culture Rescue Committee) and appointed Hada as chairman. In 1994 the alliance started a newspaper named the Voice of Southern Mongolia, and in 1995 they adopted a constitution outlining the Alliance's main mission as "opposing colonization by the Han people and striving for self-determination, freedom and democracy in Southern [Inner] Mongolia." The Voice of Southern Mongolia newspaper was declared illegal in 1995 and remains banned.

On December 10, 1995, Hada was arrested at his home by police from the Inner Mongolian Public Security Bureau. The police took all documents related to the Alliance, and names and addresses of more than 100 international scholar contacts of Hada. Hada was officially arrested on March 9, 1996.

== Trial and sentencing ==
On August 19, 1996, the Hohhot People's Procuratorate charged Hada with "espionage", "separatism", "stealing secrets for the enemy" and "organizing counterrevolutionary forces". On November 11, 1996, after a closed hearing, Hada was convicted on the charges of separatism and espionage by the Hohhot Intermediate People's Court, for which he received a combined sentence of 15 years in prison with a further 4 years deprivation of political rights. The Inner Mongolia Supreme People's Court rejected Hada's appeal. Tegexi was sentenced to 10-year prison and 3 years of deprivation of political rights for "separatism", but was released in December 2002, for "good behavior".

After Hada's arrest, at least 10 other Mongolian intellectuals were arrested. Hada's wife Xinna left a note on the door of her book store about Hada's detention and crackdown on activists. The authorities immediately suppressed a students protest that followed and arrested 12 of them. Xinna was taken into custody and investigated for "inciting students to cause a disturbance". Although not charged, Xinna was released 4 months later, on April 12, 1996. The Public Security Bureau closed the bookstore in Hohhot, even though the family had no other source of income.

In June 1998, Xinna wrote an open letter to Bill Clinton, who was visiting China as U.S. president. She described Hada's condition declaring his health problems were "not taken seriously by prison authorities". Xinna asked the authorities to transfer Hada to Hohhot prison for better care and medical treatment. The Chinese authorities never acceded to these requests.

In 2002, Uiles (or Ulies), the son of Hada was charged and sentenced to 2 years prison.,

In 2004, Human Rights in China reported that Hada had been subjected to torture.

In August 2007, Uiles was permitted to visit his father in Chifeng Prison. In a report he described the terrible condition of detention as well as the difficult health issues of his father. He was still detained beyond his sentence term without any explanation.

In December 2014, four years after his sentence term expired, Hada was released from detention, but was soon after put under house arrest and strictly surveilled by Chinese state security police.

== Nobel Prize nomination and disappearance ==
Hada was nominated by four members of the Japanese Parliament as well as U.S. Senator Jeff Merkley and Representative Chris Smith for the 2025 Nobel Peace prize. The nomination intended to recognize his continued protest for Southern Mongolia's rights and the rights of Mongolians living in China. Soon after this nomination, on January 25, 2025, Hada was sent to the hospital for emergency treatment due to severe organ failure while he was under house arrest. Hada's family was allowed to visit him for a few weeks after he went to the hospital, but after February 6th, 2025, the Chinese officers prevented any visits or communication with him, and his whereabouts thereafter became unknown.

== Notes ==
a.Chinese: 席海明; pinyin: Xí Hǎimíng; Mongolian: Temtselt Shobshuud
b.Chinese: 呼慶特古斯; pinyin: Hūqìngtègǔsī
c.Chinese: 王滿来; pinyin: Wáng Mǎnlái
