= Tibetan Sign Language =

Deaf sign language of Tibet

Standard Tibetan Sign
- Native to: China
- Region: Tibet, especially Lhasa
- Native speakers: 500 (2018)
- Language family: Deaf-community sign language

Language codes
- ISO 639-3: lsn
- Glottolog: tibe1277

Tibetan Sign Language is the recently established deaf sign language of Tibet.

Tibetan Sign is the first recognized sign language for a minority in China. The Tibetan Sign Language Project, staffed by members of the local deaf club, was set up under the supervision of Handicap International in 2001 to create a standardized language, based primarily on the existing sign language of Lhasa, as a replacement for the regional sign languages of Tibet. For example, the deaf of Nagqu have a well developed vocabulary for livestock, while those of Lhasa have more specialized vocabulary for urban life. The standard was announced by the Chinese government in 2004.

The Chinese government press agency Xinhua said that Chinese Sign Language was not practical because deaf Tibetans do not know Chinese characters, and that club members will introduce the new standard throughout Tibet. A Tibetan manual alphabet was created by club members from the Tibetan alphabet without exposure to foreign forms of fingerspelling.

== Relevant literature ==
- Hofer, Theresia (2023). "Tibetan Writing from the Socio-linguistic Margins of Tibet: Deaf Students, Tibetan Literacy and WeChat at the Lhasa Special School. HIMALAYA 43(1): 42-70.
- The Tibetan Sign Language Project of the Tibetan Deaf Association (archived 2009)
