= He Zhen (count) =

Chinese politician (1321–1388)

- 何真
- Born: 1321; Dongguan, Guangdong, Yuan China
- Died: 1388 (aged 66–67); Beijing, Ming China
- Occupations: General, official
- Parent: He Shuxian
- Relatives: He Fazao (grandfather)

Chinese name
- Chinese: 何真
Transcriptions
Standard Mandarin
- Hanyu Pinyin: Hé Zhēn

Bangzuo
- Chinese: 邦佐
Transcriptions
Standard Mandarin
- Hanyu Pinyin: Bāngzuǒ

Second alternative Chinese name
- Traditional Chinese: 羅山
- Simplified Chinese: 罗山
Transcriptions
Standard Mandarin
- Hanyu Pinyin: Luóshān

He Zhen (Chinese: 何真; 1321–1388), courtesy name Bangzuo, art name Luoshan, posthumous name Count Zhongjing of Dongguan (東莞忠靖伯), was a Chinese politician during the late Yuan dynasty and early Ming dynasty.

== Biography ==
He Zhen was born in Dongguan, Guangdong in 1321, to He Shuxian (Chinese: 何叔賢), an official in the Yuan government. When He Zhen was 8 years old, his father died. In 1363, in the 23rd year of Zhizheng period of the Yuan dynasty, his troops released Guangzhou, capital of Guangdong province. He was appointed as vice-minister of Guangdong and prime minister of Jiangxi and Fujian provinces. He was one of the most powerful officials and held highest rank in the three provinces of Guangdong, Jiangxi and Fujian.

In 1368, in the 1st year of Hongwu period of the Ming dynasty, He Zhen surrendered to the Ming government. He was appointed vice-minister of Jiangxi province. In 1378, the Ming court conferred him with the title of "Count of Dongguan" (Chinese: 東莞伯) upon his contributions of protecting the people in Guangdong province.

In 1388, he died at the age of 67, and was given the posthumous name Zhongjing (Chinese: 忠靖).

== Personal life ==
He had three sons: He Rong (Chinese: 何榮), He Gui (Chinese: 何貴) and He Hong (Chinese: 何宏), who all died in connection with Lan Yu's rebellion.
