= Michael Keating (political scientist) =

Political scientist (born 1950)

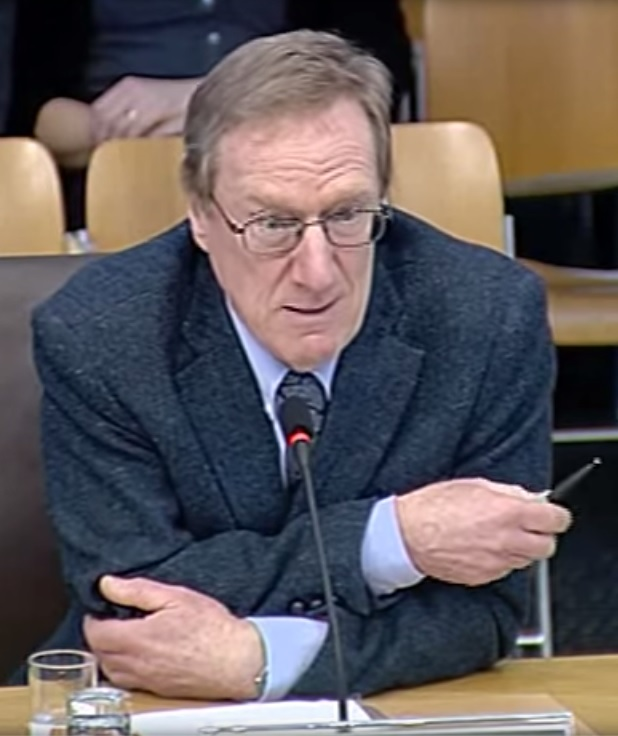
- Keating in 2015
- Born: 2 February 1950 (age 76); England
- Citizenship: British; Irish; Canadian
- Occupation: Political scientist

Michael Keating FBA FRSE FAcSS (born 2 February 1950) is a political scientist specialising in nationalism, European politics, regional politics, and devolution. He is Professor of Scottish Politics at the University of Aberdeen and Fellow of the Centre on Constitutional Change at the University of Edinburgh.

== Early life ==
Keating was born in North East England to Scottish and Irish parents. He holds British, Irish, and Canadian citizenships. Keating holds a BA from the University of Oxford and a PhD from Glasgow College of Technology, now the Glasgow Caledonian University.

== Academic career ==
Keating was previously Professor of Political Science at the University of Western Ontario, Canada and between 1979 and 1988, taught at the University of Strathclyde. He has been visiting professor in the United States, Spain, France, Australia, and England. From 2000 until 2010, he was on secondment from Aberdeen as Professor of Political and Social Sciences at the European University Institute, Florence, where he was head of the department between 2004 and 2007.

He is author of eighteen books and editor of another eighteen, as well as numerous academic articles and chapters. His publications include Nations Against the State: The New Politics of Nationalism in Quebec, Catalonia and Scotland (Macmillan, 1996), Plurinational Democracy: Stateless Nations in a Post-Sovereignty Era (Oxford University Press, 2001), The Government of Scotland: Public Policy Making after Devolution (Edinburgh University Press, 2005), The Independence of Scotland (Oxford University Press, 2009), Rescaling the European State (Oxford University Press, 2013), Approaches and Methodologies in the Social Sciences (edited with Donatella della Porta – Cambridge University Press, 2008), and Debating Scotland (Oxford University Press, 2017).

== Awards and honours ==
Keating is a Fellow of the Royal Society of Edinburgh, Fellow of the British Academy, Fellow of the Academy of Social Sciences, and Member of the European Academy.
