= Temtsiltu Shobtsood =

Mongolian activist

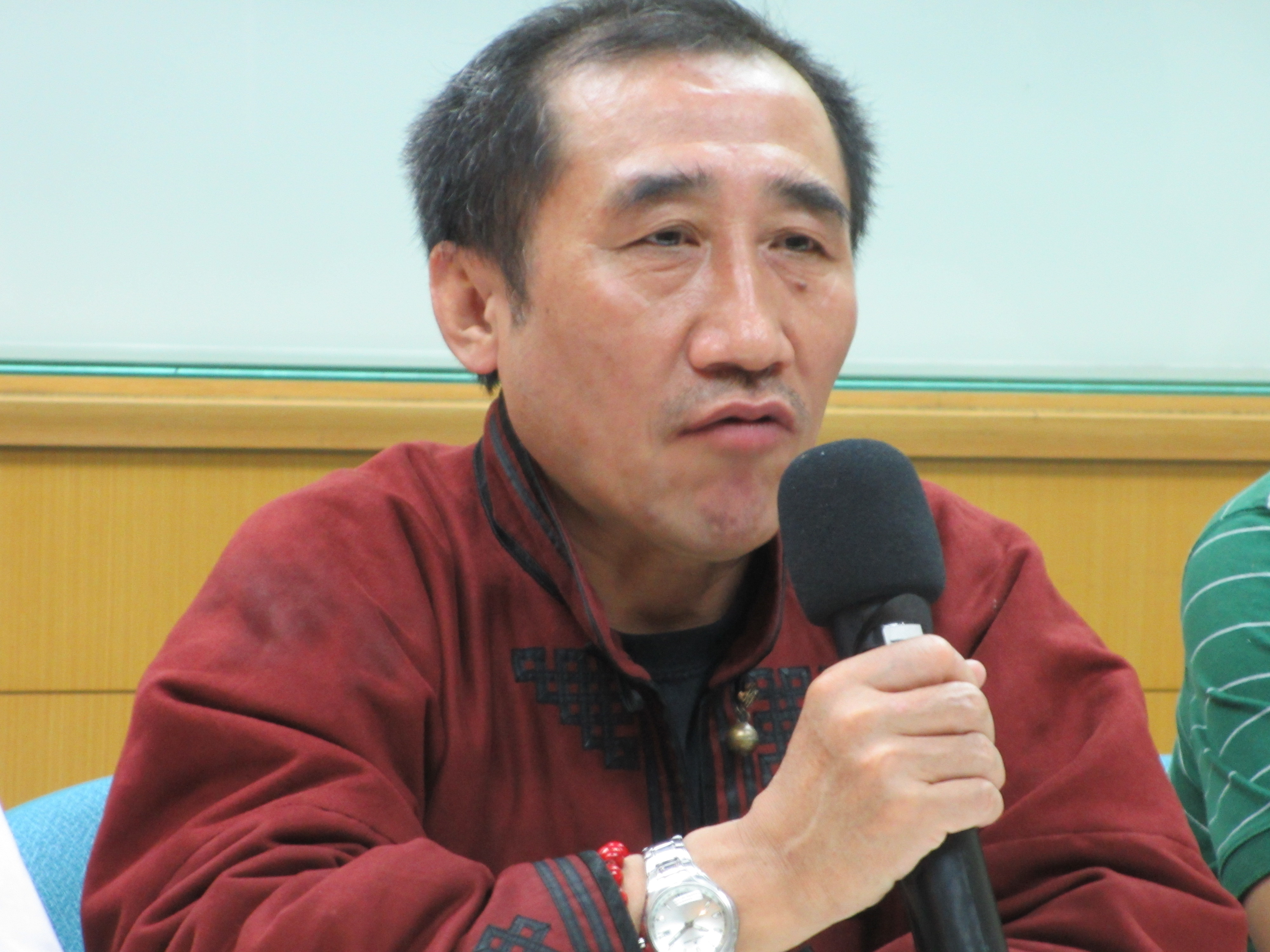
Temtsiltu Shobtsood in 2013

Temtsiltu Shobtsood (Mongolian: Шовчууд Тэмцэлт; born August 1956) or Temtselt Shobshuud, also known as his Chinese name Xi Haiming (Chinese: 席海明), is an ethnic Mongol activist who campaigns for the independence of "Southern Mongolia" (China's Inner Mongolia Autonomous Region). Now he is the president of the South Mongolia Congress.

Temtsiltu was born in Naiman Banner, a banner in Tongliao, Inner Mongolia. In early 1981, while at university he joined the Inner Mongolian student movement together with Hada, Huchuntegus and Wang Manlai, which was campaigning to preserve Mongolian identity in Inner Mongolia under Chinese law. Due to his activities, the Chinese authorities put him under surveillance.

He graduated from Inner Mongolia Normal University and obtained his bachelor's degree in history in 1982. He founded the Inner Mongolian League for the Defense of Human Rights in 1987, and opened a Mongolian studies bookstore in Hohhot in 1990. In 1991, he was arrested together with Huchuntegus and many of his friends by the Chinese government. Later, he and Huchuntegus fled to Mongolia. He was granted political asylum in Germany in 1993.

In 1997, he started the Inner Mongolian People's Party in Princeton, New Jersey, the goal of which is to attain independence for Inner Mongolia.

In 2015, he was removed from his position as chairman at an emergency executive meeting of the Inner Mongolian People's Party. This was because he abandoned the demand for Inner Mongolian independence and advanced his own “dual ownership theory,” which asserted that Inner Mongolia should be jointly governed by both Chinese and Mongols.

In 2016, he founded the South Mongolia Congress and assumed the position of president.

He currently lives in Germany together with his wife and daughter.

== See also ==
- Inner Mongolian independence movement
