= Macau independence =

Independence movement in China

Flag of Portuguese Macao

Flag of the Macau SAR, used since 1999

Macau independence (Chinese: 澳門獨立; Portuguese: Independência de Macau) is a stance advocating for Macau's independence from the People's Republic of China. The issue of Macau independence was raised in 2016 as a result of controversy about the revision of Legislative Assembly of Macau election law, which is indirectly influenced by the Hong Kong Legislative Council oath-taking controversy. Media outlets, including the Global Times (affiliated with the Central Committee of the Chinese Communist Party) and Macau's Jornal San Wa Ou sensationalized Macau independence the following year and were criticized. Critics expressed concerns that raising discussion could turn an obscure, unpopular topic into reality, comparing it to how Hong Kong independence was increasingly discussed after being brought up by former Hong Kong Chief Executive Leung Chun-ying (known as the "Father of Hong Kong Independence") for his role in spotlighting the issue. Commentary by Radio France Internationale suggested that Macau independence was a narrative fabricated by authorities to suppress opposition. Portugal had attempted to force China to recognize Macau's independence during its weakened state after the Opium Wars, but Chinese governments have never relinquished sovereignty over Macau.

== Background ==
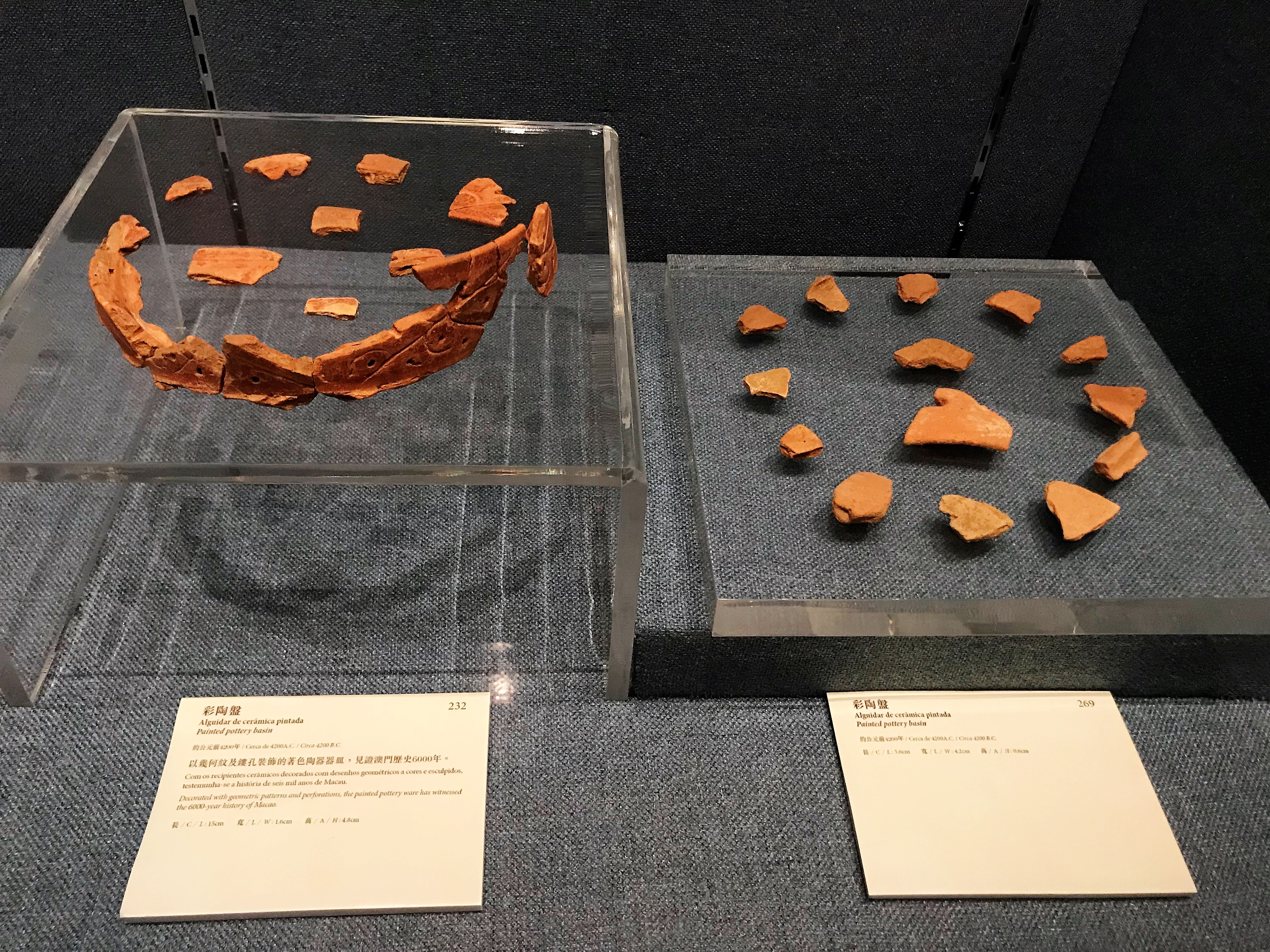
Fragments of pottery found in Coloane

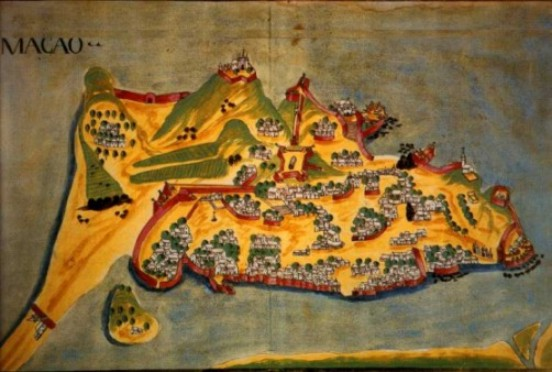
1635 map of Macau

The Portuguese colony of Macau was established in 1557 in exchange for 500 taels (about 20 kg) of silver per year. Maria II of Portugal declared in 1845 that Macau would become a free port in response to the establishment of the nearby free port of Hong Kong, which posed an economic threat. The government of Macau became more hostile to the Qing offices established in the area, and began a campaign to remove them and expand the colony's territory. The Qing government was forced to sign the 1887 Sino-Portuguese Treaty of Peking, which (among other concessions) recognised a permanent settlement of Macau by the Portuguese in exchange for Portugal agreeing to not cede the territory to another power without Qing consent. By 1889, Macau had expanded to roughly its current size.

A 16 December 1946 United Nations resolution declared that Macau, Singapore, and all other colonies were considered "Non-Self-Governing Territories," which meant that they could break away from their colonial powers and become independent nations. The UN passed Resolution 1514 on 14 December 1960, granting colonial territories the right to self-determination and independence. In late September 1964, left-wing organizations from the International Union of Students met in Moscow. On 20 September, leaders of Soviet youth organizations began group discussions and demanded the independence of Hong Kong and Macau. A representative from Ceylon (now Sri Lanka) introduced a draft resolution calling for the abolition of colonialism in Asia, listing Hong Kong, Macau, East Timor, Papua New Guinea, Oman, Aden, and South Arabia as candidates for independence according to the United Nations declaration. The Chinese representatives strongly objected, asserting that Hong Kong and Macau were Chinese territories which had been occupied by Britain and Portugal; the resolution calling for the independence of Hong Kong and Macau was seen as an attempt to separate the territories from China. The draft resolution proposed by the Ceylon representative was passed. The Chinese delegation later issued a statement accusing the forum of being used by the Soviet Union as an "anti-China" tool rather than a means of uniting the Third World against imperialism.

On 3 December 1966, the 12-3 incident triggered clashes between police and the public and led to widespread protests against colonial rule. Local pro-Beijing leftist groups, influenced by the Cultural Revolution, introduced methods from the Cultural Revolution; through an "anti-colonial, patriotic" struggle, they aimed to seize power from the colonial government. The 12-3 incident resulted in eight deaths and over 200 people injured. The Foreign Affairs Office of the Guangdong People's Committee and pro-communist organizations in Macau, presented six demands on 10 December to Governor of Macau, José Manuel de Sousa e Faro Nobre de Carvalho, including a demand for him to publicly apologize and sign a confession. Beginning on 21 December, the Macau-Portuguese government was forced to send representatives daily to Gongbei to negotiate the confession's content with the Guangdong Foreign Affairs Office. The Guangdong People's Committee closed the border gate at Gongbei in January 1967, blocking food and water from mainland China and forcing the Macau government to comply. The Macau Portuguese government issued an apology on 28 January, signing the "Reply to the Protest Letter from the Chinese Community Representatives," and the involved officials were removed from Macau. The Macau-Portuguese government's authority declined after the incident, and it lost the will to govern; all its political decisions aligned with the mainland authorities and the Chinese Communist Party. It cooperated with efforts to purge Kuomintang influence in Macau; before the incident, a balance of power had existed between KMT and CCP forces. Pro-Communist Chinese leader He Xian became the de facto "shadow Governor" of Macau, and some called Macau a "semi-liberated zone." From then on, left-wing forces controlled Macau society.

On 8 March 1972, the People's Republic of China (which had recently replaced the Republic of China and assumed the China seat at the United Nations) insisted on sovereignty over Hong Kong and Macau. It said that Macau "does not belong to the usual colonial category" and, with a resolution, asked that "it should not be included in the list of territories to which the colonial declaration applies." On 2 November of that year, during a meeting, Resolution 2908 ("Implementation of the Declaration on the Granting of Independence to Colonial Countries and Peoples") was passed with 99 votes in favor of granting colonial territories the right to self-determination. Five countries – the United Kingdom, France, Portugal, South Africa, and the United States – voted against it, and 23 countries abstained. Under PRC pressure, an amendment was adopted to exclude Macau and Hong Kong from the "list of territories to which the Declaration is applicable"; the right of self-determination and independence in the declaration did not apply to Macau, but the resolution did not address Hong Kong's status because of the UN's lack of authority to intervene in the territorial claims of member states. Macau lost the right of self-determination.

In 1975, the Portuguese offered to return Macau to China. Because the Cultural Revolution was still wreaking havoc on the mainland, however, the CCP refused to take back the colony. On 13 April 1987, the governments of Portugal and China signed the Sino-Portuguese Joint Declaration to lay out the terms of the handover of Macau to the PRC. The date for the handover was set at 20 December 1999.

=== Ideology ===
Former associate professor in the Department of Government and Public Administration at the University of Macau Chou Kwok Ping compared the political stances of social groups in Macau and Hong Kong. He noted that pro-Beijing forces in Hong Kong were crushed by the British colonial government during the 1967 riots. The Hong Kong public resented the leftist forces for disrupting the city's stability and prosperity, and the British authorities curbed their challenges to Hong Kong autonomy. In Macau, however, leftist forces compelled the Portuguese colonial government to concede during the 1966 12-3 incident. This allowed leftists to establish roots across social strata, leading to Macau society being broadly pro-China with a stronger sense of identification with mainland China; as a result, fostering a distinct local identity in Macau has been challenging. The people of Macau have a strong sense of cultural and governmental alignment with China and, from the Chinese government perspective, Macau is considered a more successful example of the "one country, two systems" principle than Hong Kong.

Despite both being colonial governments, the Portuguese response to the 12-3 incident and the British response to the 1967 riots were markedly different. The Portuguese chose to "apologize and admit fault"; the British authorities adopted a "no compromise" approach, maintaining order until the Chinese government forced Hong Kong's leftist forces to cease their activities. These differing strategies led to contrasting developmental trajectories in the two regions over the next 20 years. After the Portuguese government lost its will to govern, Macau experienced a period of stagnation in politics, economy, society, and culture; the British administration in Hong Kong, in contrast, demonstrated strong governance and high public support after quelling the leftist riots. After a review of the causes of the 1967 unrest, the British implemented political, economic, and social reform which propelled Hong Kong into a "golden era" during the 1970s and 1980s as one of the Four Asian Tigers. Macau's stagnation and decline became increasingly apparent, leading its residents (unlike some in Hong Kong who opposed reunification) to view reunification as a means of addressing the Portuguese administration's inaction.

In civil society, Macau lags behind Hong Kong. Hong Kong has a robust civil society with non-government organizations supporting press freedom, advocating for public interests, and fighting for democracy with universities which support political and democratic movements. Students in Hong Kong have discussed the possibility of independence since 2014, with most pro-independence movements originating from Hong Kong universities; growing anti-Beijing sentiment has led fewer Hong Kong people to identify as Chinese. Civil society is less developed in Macau, and organizations representing public interests have less influence; universities in Macau are less inclined to engage in political discussions.

Macau's construction of identity and national affiliation differs from that of Hong Kong. In December 2015, a University of Hong Kong telephone poll surveyed 510 Macau residents. The results indicated that the identification with being Chinese increased by two points over the precious year, matching their identification as Macau people; both scored 7.9 out of 10. The survey also indicated that Macau residents were most concerned about livelihood issues and economic and political concerns, with little change. A 2017 article in The Economist, after the extensive damage caused by Typhoon Hato in Macau, highlighted a key difference between Hong Kong and Macau. Macau residents supported the People's Liberation Army's efforts in assisting with post-typhoon disaster relief, but similar humanitarian efforts by the PLA in Hong Kong were often greeted with skepticism.

=== Present day ===
Unlike in Hong Kong, support for Macau independence has been limited; this has been linked, in part, to Macau's economic dependence on mainland China. Gambling and tourism account for more than half of Macau's GDP, and the region relies on visitors from mainland China. According to an opinion article on the Swedish news website The Perspective, this dependence discourages support for political movements which could damage relations with Beijing.

The article said that Macau and Hong Kong face similar issues, including rising property values, immigration pressures, perceived "mainlandization" of local culture, limited democratic representation, and intervention by the central government. However, Hong Kong's larger and more diversified economy has given it greater freedom to politically challenge Beijing than Macau.

== Events ==
=== 2016 legislative controversy ===
In 2016, after the fifth interpretation of the Basic Law of the Hong Kong Special Administrative Region by the Standing Committee of the National People's Congress of the People's Republic of China about the Hong Kong Legislative Council oath-taking controversy, the Macau government submitted a proposal to the Legislative Assembly to amend the electoral law. The amendment required candidates to declare their support for the Basic Law and loyalty to the Macau Special Administrative Region, and stipulated that candidates could not hold legislative positions in other countries. Secretary for Administration and Justice Chan Hoi Fan Sonia said that the new provisions were introduced as a precautionary measure, referencing the interpretation of Article 104 of Hong Kong's Basic Law by the NPC, and the inclusion of a declaration form was intended to "nip issues in the bud." Chan also said that the Electoral Affairs Commission would evaluate candidates' past statements or actions to determine if they were "not supportive or disloyal." Since the amendment would not be retroactive, however, candidates who signed the declaration and expressed a willingness to renounce previous "disloyal or un-supportive" remarks would not lose their eligibility as legislators. Candidates who refused to sign the declaration, or were proven to lack support or loyalty, would be disqualified from running.

Commentary in Jornal Informação (Són Pou) described Macau's society as harmonious and docile (likening it to a "little lamb"), criticized the government's actions as "asking for trouble" and "unnecessary," and questioning whether the government intended to eliminate all opposition. It said that the government's approach would only increase public dissatisfaction and speculated that the government might be using Hong Kong as a model, finding a scapegoat for its own governmental failures. The commentary said that Macau has never had a "Macau independence" ideology, with neither has the market nor the soil for it. It criticized those who claim to be wary of Macau independence, saying that they provoke such discussions. Coupled with local dissatisfaction with government incompetence and corruption, regional grievances could spread to resentment of the Beijing government. The article criticized the Macau government for quickly introducing new legal amendments less than a month after the Hong Kong NPC interpretation, while its handling of livelihood issues was slow and inefficient.

New Macau Association vice president Sou Ka Hou criticized the government for "imitating poorly", and accused Chan Hoi Fan of trying to become the "mother of Macau independence." He noted that Article 101 of the Basic Law clearly outlines the requirements for lawmakers to swear to uphold, support, and be loyal to the law, and making further amendments to the law was an act of "overstepping the Basic Law." Sou criticized the proposed legal amendments, saying that the claim of "being prepared in advance" was "an attempt to cover up guilt."

=== 2017 independence controversy ===
During the September 2017 Macau Legislative Assembly election, Global Times (a subsidiary of the Chinese Communist Party's official People's Daily) published a 13 September article entitled "Plotting to Introduce Radical Protest! Macau 'Independence Advocates' Seek to Enter the Legislative Assembly." The article cited reports from the pro-establishment media outlet Jornal San Wa Ou, criticizing Legislative Assembly candidate and pro-democracy New Macau Association member Sulu Sou Ka Hou as a "symbol of the pan-democratic camp, attempting to bring Hong Kong-style protest tactics into Macau's society and Legislative Assembly." It said that another member of the association, Wong Kin-long, had posted on social media that "participating in Macau's Legislative Assembly elections allows one to advocate for Hong Kong independence because Hong Kong's Basic Law cannot be enforced in Macau."

On 9 September, during a campaign rally at Rotunda de Carlos da Maia held by Sulu Sou and other members of the New Macau Association as the Progressive Association, they were confronted by over ten individuals claiming to be members of the Macau Collectors Association. The protesters carried banners and chanted slogans such as "Oppose pro-independence groups entering the Legislative Assembly." The banners bore messages like "Wong Kin-long, stop spreading independence to harm young people," "In the face of disaster, the motherland is our support," and "Pro-independence groups are inhumane." The association's president, Ng Lei Fan, said that they noticed "pro-independence" youth on the candidate list of the New Macau Association and had heard allegations that Hong Kong's pro-independence election tactics were being imported into Macau. Ng expressed firm opposition to pro-independence ideology entering Macau, and emphasized their determination not to allow such ideas to harm youth.

Members of the Progressive Association campaign team asked one of the protesters to provide evidence that Wong had promoted "Macau independence." The protester opened their phone to search, but was unable to find anything. Another protester then told them, "Don't answer any of their questions!" Meanwhile, several protesters repeatedly shouted, "Pro-independence groups are simply inhumane!" Later, when approached by journalists, one of the protesters said they were part of the "anti-independence group" and expressed concern that Hong Kong's pro-independence faction might transfer their "tactics" to Macau's Legislative Assembly. A journalist responded that there was no such thing as "Macau independence" and the man replied, "It cannot be allowed to exist." When the journalist asked why this was connected to the New Macau Association candidates, the man said that the candidates were linked to Hong Kong's pro-independence groups. Pressed for evidence, he admitted: "We don't have any at the moment ... we're just expressing our opinions ... all in all, we are against it."

On 13 September, members of the Progressive Association held a gathering at Areia Preta which was disrupted by the lead candidates of three other groups: Li Shaokun from Group 17, Wong Wai Man from Group 22, and Lee Kin Yun from Group 23. They insulted members of the association, using terms such as "traitors," and attempted to obstruct campaign speeches and promotional activities of the Progressive Association candidates.

The individuals involved and reports introducing the subject of Macau independence topic faced criticism and rebuttal from Progressive Association members, scholars, experts, and some media outlets. Sulu Sou and Wong Kin Long clarified the accusations, saying that labeling opposition members as advocating independence or being influenced by foreign forces is a common political tactic used by Beijing authorities. Sou argued that certain groups falsely accusing Progressive Association candidates of "pushing for independence" are, in a way, an acknowledgment of the association's past efforts in monitoring the government. Responding to a Stand News inquiry, Wong Kin Long said that the statements cited by the Global Times were legal, technical discussions to point out loopholes in Macau's legal system and did not represent his support for Hong Kong independence. He said that he ever advocated Macau or Hong Kong independence, criticizing the Global Times for distorting the facts. According to Wong, "In Macau, Macau independence simply does not exist."

After his election, Sou said on a Radio Macau program that "patriotism" had been distorted into mere "expressions of loyalty" and reduced to a slogan. He questioned whether some people were using "patriotism" to gain benefits. A listener pointed out that no candidate groups had included "Macau independence" in their platforms, but some individuals hid behind the internet and made baseless accusations that certain groups were "promoting Macau independence." The listener called these "troublemakers who disrupt society" the "fathers of Macau independence"; rather than discussing Macau independence, it would be better to focus on "loving the country and loving Macau." The listener criticized legislators for only talking about "loving the country and Macau" without taking real action.

=== 2021 San Francisco Chinese Consulate event ===
Bay Area groups in California gathered in front of the Chinese Consulate General in San Francisco on 15 January 2021 for a memorial event commemorating Leung Ling-kit, who died during Hong Kong's anti-extradition movement. Attendees included Hong Kong independence organizations and supporters of Macau independence, some of whom held signs reading "Macau Independence" in Chinese and English. One participant said that they had organized events in Macau in 2019 to demonstrate solidarity with Hong Kong's anti-extradition movement (including black-clad campus protests), which were met with intimidation from the police. The participant said, "The Chinese Communist Party has never stopped suppressing Macau while cracking down on Hong Kong, which is why Macau residents should stand in support of Hong Kongers."

== Commentary ==
Tam Chi Keung, a professor at Macau University of Science and Technology and an expert on Macau issues, said that in the years leading up to the 2017 Legislative Assembly elections he had never heard of "Macau independence" or "independence advocates." He called accusations in related articles "completely baseless," suggesting an attempt by pro-Beijing media to smear opponents in the election. Eilo Wing-Yat Yu, an associate professor in the Department of Government and Public Administration at the University of Macau, expressed concern that discussiing "independence advocates" might turn a non-existent issue into a real one. He compared the situation to Hong Kong a decade earlier, when no one discussed Hong Kong independence until Chief Executive Leung Chun-ying raised the issue; people began talking, and he was nicknamed "Father of Hong Kong Independence." Yu noted that the political atmosphere in Macau differs from that in Hong Kong. Most Macau residents do not support radical approaches, and sentiments such as "anti-China" or "anti-Communist" lack traction in Macau: "When Global Times raised the issue of 'Macau independence,' everyone knew trouble was brewing, because this wasn't even a real issue to begin with. But once you name it, it becomes one."

Macau media outlet Jornal Informação (Són Pou) published commentary critical of Macau's 2017 Legislative Assembly elections. In addition to "overwhelming defamatory remarks" online, groups (or candidates) broke the law by disrupting the campaign activities of certain groups; these groups were labeled with terms like "Macau independence" and "traitor of the nation," which the article suggested was part of an organized suppression effort. The article said that "patriotism and love for Macau" have always been a "long-standing tradition" among the people of Macau, and there is no fertile ground for "Macau independence"; discussing Macau independence domestically is "electoral poison" and "political suicide." It suggested that those advocating Macau independence were doing so because "anti-Macau independence" would become a lucrative avenue in the future, criticizing this behavior.

Pro-democracy Macau Legislative Assembly member Au Kam San suggested that the Global Times may have deliberately exaggerated by labeling opposition candidates as advocates of Macau independence. He pointed out that the vast majority of Macau's population consists of new immigrants from mainland China or second-generation immigrants, with only about one-third native-born Macau residents. Since the 1960s, Macau's civil society has been dominated by pro-Beijing associations; following China's reform and opening-up, the society has become closely aligned with the Beijing government. As a result, the notion of Macau independence has little support. According to Radio France Internationale, Macau independence issue is a farcical narrative fabricated by the authorities to suppress the opposition.

Pundit Lee Kwok-keung believes that vested-interest groups exaggerate the issue of Macau independence to create a fictional enemy, aiming to win favor (and rewards) from the Chinese government. He compared these individuals to late-Ming-dynasty generals who fabricated enemies and inflated minor skirmishes into grand victories, securing imperial commendations and military funds through deception. According to Lee, the greatest threat to the regime is not the opposition figures accused of advocating independence who "have nothing more than a pen and a voice"; it is the real estate developers who have amassed wealth through unscrupulous land speculation and hoarding since the handover of Macau.

In his article, "Comprehensively and Accurately Implementing 'One Country, Two Systems' as the Fundamental Guarantee for Macau's Prosperity and Stability," government-appointed legislator and University of Macau law professor Iau Teng Pio wrote that the Macau government's efforts to promote patriotic education among young people have enhanced their understanding of the development, culture, and values of the Chinese nation, China's historical progress, and Macau's relationship with the country. This has helped students "accurately understand the nation and Macau," preventing pro-independence rhetoric, fostering patriotism, and supporting the implementation of "one country, two systems" in Macau.

Hong Kong freelance writer Hau Chun-on countered that Macau, with a history of 500 years of independence from mainland rule (longer than Hong Kong), has a greater claim to independence. Hau suggested that Macau's independence could follow examples of "small nations separating from larger powers" around the world and proposed that Macau could model itself on Monaco, relying on its gambling industry as an economic pillar. An independent Macau, he said, could establish "true democracy" and "plan ahead" to address potential economic issues.

The Hong Kong National Party, a group advocating Hong Kong independence, was banned by the Hong Kong government in September 2018. A reporter asked Macau's Secretary for Security Wong Sio Chak if the Macau government would take similar action if an organization advocating Macau independence emerged. Wong said that Macau's laws regulate associations to ensure that they do not violate legal provisions, harm national security, or damage Macau's public order and customs; a situation similar to Hong Kong's had not occurred, so it was impossible to predict how such a case would be handled. Each case was different, and any incidents would be assessed under the Macau National Security Law and related legal frameworks: "Criticism of the government and crimes that endanger national security are two separate issues. I hope people do not conflate them."

== Law ==
Advocating Macau independence is considered illegal by Macau authorities. According to the National Security Law, "anyone who attempts, through violence or other serious illegal means, to separate a part of the national territory from national sovereignty or to subject it to foreign sovereignty shall be sentenced to 10 to 25 years in prison." Incitement can be punished under the penal code as "incitement to violent alteration of an established system."

== See also ==
- East Turkestan independence movement
- Hong Kong independence
- Taiwan independence movement
- Tibetan independence movement
