= Inner Mongolian People's Party =

US-based political organization

- President: Khereid Khuvisgalt
- Secretary: Dolgion Khatgin
- Founded: 23 March 1997; 29 years ago
- Headquarters: Princeton, New Jersey, United States
- Ideology: Southern Mongolian independence

Party flag

Inner Mongolian People's Party

Chinese name
- Simplified Chinese: 内蒙古人民党
- Traditional Chinese: 內蒙古人民黨
Transcriptions
Standard Mandarin
- Hanyu Pinyin: Nèiměnggǔ Rénmín Dǎng

Abbreviation
- Simplified Chinese: 内人党
- Traditional Chinese: 內人黨
Transcriptions
Standard Mandarin
- Hanyu Pinyin: Nèiréndǎng

Mongolian name
- Mongolian Cyrillic: Өвөр Монголын Ардын Нам
- Mongolian script: ᠥᠪᠥᠷ ᠮᠣᠩᠭᠣᠯ ‍ᠤᠨ ᠠᠷᠠᠳ ᠤᠨ ᠨᠠᠮ

The Inner Mongolian People's Party (IMPP) (Note: Mongolian: Өвөр Монголын Ардын Нам, romanized: Övör Mongolyn Aradyn Nam; Traditional Mongolian: ᠥᠪᠥᠷ ᠮᠣᠩᠭᠣᠯ ‍ᠤᠨ ᠠᠷᠠᠳ ᠤᠨ ᠨᠠᠮ; simplified Chinese: 内蒙古人民党; traditional Chinese: 內蒙古人民黨; pinyin: Nèiměnggǔ Rénmín Dǎng; abbr. 内人党 / 內人黨, pinyin: Nèiréndǎng) is an Inner Mongolian secessionist movement. The party was started in 1997 in Princeton, New Jersey. Citing the abuses of the Chinese government against Mongols during the Cultural Revolution, the goal of the party is to establish an independent state of Inner Mongolia; the potential for unification with the existent nation of Mongolia is beyond the current scope of party goals.

== Establishment ==
The Inner Mongolian People's Party was established on 23 March 1997 in Princeton, New Jersey with the goal of creating an independent state of Inner Mongolia. Another reason for the creation of the IMPP is that some of the Inner Mongolian people still have many unaddressed grievances dating back to the atrocities committed during Cultural Revolution. They believe that the Chinese government has not been held accountable or acknowledged their wrongdoings. The re-unification of Inner Mongolia and Mongolia is not currently within the "scope" of the IMPP as their current primary focus is on attaining independence for Inner Mongolia.

== Organization ==
The IMPP has a chairman and vice chairman who are directly elected. The secretary general is proposed by the chairman and approved by the Standing Committee, who is elected by Congress representatives. The chairman, vice chairman and secretary general all are automatically committee members. The IMPP has branches in a few countries that are set up by the chairman and vice chairman. Additionally, there is an advisory board that is made up of non-IMPP members.

In March 1997, more than fifty IMPP members from Mongolia, Germany, Japan, Canada and the United States attended the first Congress of the Inner Mongolian People's Party, which meets every four years, and acts as a decision-making body. Xi Haiming (Shobtsood Temtsiltu) was elected as chairman, Bache was elected vice chairman, and Oyunbilig was elected as general secretary. Additionally, at the congressional meeting the Constitution was passed, membership criteria agreed upon, flag design finalized and, an "Open Letter to the People of Inner Mongolia" was issued and distributed. The party's headquarters are in the United States due to the contentious relationship with the People's Republic of China. Due to sensitivity issues and to protect IMPP members, there is limited information available to the public concerning party membership and the identities of their members.

Chairman Xi Haiming was removed from his post on March 1, 2015, by an emergency Executive Committee meeting convened online. Of the six committee members, all five except Xi Haiming himself voted in favor of his dismissal. The reason for his removal stemmed from his abandonment of the call for Southern Mongolian independence and his unilateral announcement—without consultation with the leadership or party members—of his own theory of “dual ownership.”

In May of the same year (2015), the Inner Mongolian People’s Party held a meeting in Sweden, where it elected Dolgion Khatgin, an exile activist residing in Sweden, as its second leader. Later, in 2021, it elected Khereid Khuvisgalt, an exile activist residing in Japan, as the third leader, a position he continues to hold to the present day.

On October 1, 2025, the Inner Mongolian People’s Party held the International Conference Commemorating the 100th Anniversary of the Inner Mongolian People’s Party in the Parliament building in Japan.

== Key members ==
=== Khereid Khuvisgalt, President ===
Khereid Khuvisgalt was born in Inner Mongolia. One of the leaders of the 1981 student movement, he operated in the Inner Mongolia Autonomous Region as an underground member of the Inner Mongolian People’s Party. He later fled to Japan, where he served as head of the party’s Japan branch. In 2021, he was elected as the third president

=== Dolgion Khatgin, Secretary General ===
After serving as the second President (2015–2021), Dolgion Khatgin assumed his current position. He currently resides in Sweden.

== Membership ==
The only criterion for membership is that the individual accept the Constitution and is willing to actively participate in all events. According to the Constitution, members are free to withdraw their membership should they wish to do so.

== 100th Anniversary ==
The International Conference Commemorating the 100th Anniversary of the Inner Mongolian People’s Party was held to mark the centennial of its predecessor, the Inner Mongolian People’s Revolutionary Party, which was founded on October 13, 1925. The conference was hosted by Khereid Khuvisgalt, President of the Inner Mongolian People’s Party. Participants came from a wide range of fields, including members of the Japanese Parliament, representatives of the Japanese Parliamentary League for Supporting Southern Mongolia, international supporters, and human rights advocates.

As special guests, Tsakhiagiin Elbegdorj (former President of Mongolia) and Dr. Tsewang Gyalpo Arya, Representative of the Office of His Holiness the Dalai Lama in Japan, were in attendance. The following Japanese Parliament members attended in person: House of Representatives members Keiro Kitagami and Yoichi Shimada; House of Councillors members Shigefumi Matsuzawa, Sekihei, and Sayaka Shioiri. In addition, the following Parliament members were represented by their secretaries: House of Representatives members Rintaro Ishibashi (Secretary-General of the Parliamentary League for Supporting Southern Mongolia), Shinjiro Hiranuma, Yuuichiro Wada, Ryotaro Konomi, and House of Councillors member Hirofumi Takinami.

A congratulatory message was sent by the Japanese Parliamentary League for Supporting Southern Mongolia, chaired by House of Representatives member Sanae Takaichi, and was presented during the opening ceremony.

Also at the opening ceremony, certificates of appreciation were awarded to the Japanese Parliamentary League for Supporting Southern Mongolia, as well as to Hidetoshi Ishii (President of the Indo-Pacific Human Rights Information Center) and his wife Yoko Ishii (President of the Free Tibet Fukuoka), in recognition of their long-standing support for Southern Mongolia.

In his keynote address, Khereid Khuvisgalt reviewed the century-long history of the struggle for freedom in Southern Mongolia and reaffirmed the party’s unwavering goal of Southern Mongolian independence.

A special lecture was delivered by Professor Yang Haiying, a renowned historian from Southern Mongolia and a prolific author. Prior to the lecture, Enghebatu Togochog (President of the Southern Mongolian Human Rights Information Center) presented Professor Yang with the English edition of his book The Grassland Without Gravestones. This English edition was translated from the Japanese version into English by Enghebatu Togochog and published in the United States.

Furthermore, in recognition of the dedication and spirit of Hada—who has continued his lifelong struggle despite 30 years of imprisonment and the deprivation of freedom for his entire family—Party Leader Khereid Khuvisgalt presented the “Spiritual Leader of Southern Mongolia Award.” Enghebatu Togochog accepted the award on Hada’s behalf, stating that he would deliver it to him personally when Hada regains his freedom.

In addition to branch representatives and executive members of the Inner Mongolian People’s Party, attendees included activists from Tibet, Uyghur, Hong Kong, and the Chinese democracy movement, as well as Japanese supporters and representatives of Mongolic communities such as the Oirat Kalmyk, Buryat, and Hazara.

== Constitution ==
The Constitution, passed at the first Congress, states the party's main goals as "to uphold the principles of democracy and peace in fighting to end the Chinese Communist Party's colonial rule in Inner Mongolia" and the "ultimate goal is to achieve the independence of Inner Mongolia."

== See also ==
- Separatist movements of China
  - Inner Mongolian independence movement
- Inner Mongolian People's Republic
- Mongolian People's Party in Outer Mongolia
