= 1958 in Malaya =

- Decades: 1930s; 1940s; 1950s; 1960s
- See also: Other events of 1958; History of Malaysia • Timeline • Years

This article lists important figures and events in Malayan public affairs during the year 1958, together with births and deaths of significant Malayans.

== Incumbent political figures ==
=== Federal level ===
- Yang di-Pertuan Agong: Tuanku Abdul Rahman of Negeri Sembilan
- Raja Permaisuri Agong: Tunku Kurshiah of Negeri Sembilan
- Prime Minister: Tunku Abdul Rahman Putra Al-Haj
- Deputy Prime Minister: Datuk Abdul Razak

=== State level ===
- Sultan of Johor: Sultan Ibrahim
- Sultan of Kedah:
  - Sultan Badlishah (until 1958)
  - Sultan Abdul Halim Muadzam Shah (from 1958)
- Sultan of Kelantan: Sultan Ibrahim
- Raja of Perlis: Tuanku Syed Putra
- Sultan of Perak: Sultan Yusuf Izzuddin Shah
- Sultan of Pahang: Sultan Abu Bakar
- Sultan of Selangor: Sultan Hisamuddin Alam Shah (Deputy Yang di-Pertuan Agong)
- Sultan of Terengganu: Sultan Ismail Nasiruddin Shah
- Yang di-Pertuan Besar of Negeri Sembilan: Tunku Munawir (Regent)
- Yang di-Pertua Negeri (Governor) of Penang: Raja Uda
- Yang di-Pertua Negeri (Governor) of Malacca: Tun Leong Yew Koh

(Source: Malaysian Department of Informations)

== Events ==
- Early 1958 – Malaysian Ceylonese Congress was founded.
- February – Sulaiman Courts, Malaya's first residential flats were opened.
- 5–11 March – United Nations Economic Commission for Asia and the Far East Conference was held in Kuala Lumpur.
- May – The Klang Gates Dam, the first water reservoir dam in Klang Valley was opened.
- 24 May–1 June – Malaya competed in the 1958 Asian Games in Tokyo, Japan and won three bronze medals, in athletics, weightlifting and tennis.
- 1 June – The Royal Malayan Air Force (RMAF) is established.
- 18–26 July – Malaya competed in the 1958 British Empire and Commonwealth Games in Cardiff, Wales and won two silver medals, in weightlifting.
- 26 August – The Malayan People's Socialist Front (later renamed as the Malayan People's Socialist Party) was formed.
- 28 August – National Visual Arts Gallery of Malaysia was established by Prime Minister Tunku Abdul Rahman.
- 28 August – The Elections Ordinance 1958 was enacted.
- 31 August – The first anniversary of the Federation of Malaya's independence was celebrated.
- 6 December – The Indian President Dr. Rajendra Prasad was the first foreign leader to visit Malaya.
- 10 December – The 10th anniversary of the Universal Declaration of Human Rights was celebrated.
- Unknown date – Bukit Bintang Boys' Secondary School was founded by Miss Mary Glasgow.
- Unknown date – Malacca Art Gallery was established.
- Unknown date – The Corrosive and Explosive Substances and Offensive Weapons Ordinance 1958 was enacted.

== Births ==
- 1 January – Eman Manan – Actor
- 6 January – Chef Wan – Celebrity chef
- 7 January – Yasmin Ahmad – Film director (died 2009)
- 27 January – Accapan – Actor and comedian
- 22 March – A. Rahman bin Mokhtar – Politician (died 2013)
- 27 May – Yunus Alif – Footballer and coach
- 9 July
  - Jacob Joseph, football coach
  - Abdul Latiff Ahmad, politician
- 10 July – Salleh Said Keruak, politician
- 28 July – Amy Search, singer
- 21 August – Idris Jala, politician and minister
- 2 September – Azlan Man, Menteri Besar of Perlis
- 22 November – Ibrahim Iskandar of Johor, Sultan of Johor and Yang di-Pertuan Agong of Malaysia
- 30 November – Mohamed Khaled Nordin, Menteri Besar of Johor
- 10 December – Ahmad Shabery Cheek, politician and minister
- 28 December – Raja Ashman Shah ibni Sultan Azlan Muhibbuddin Shah – Raja Kecil Sulung Perak Darul Ridzuan
- Unknown date – Rosli Khamis (Loloq) – Lyrics writer (died 2008)
- Unknown date – Zaidi Omar – Actor

== Deaths ==
- 26 May – Cheong Yoke Choy, tin miner, banker, philanthropist and community leader in Kuala Lumpur (b. 1873).
- 13 July – Sultan Badlishah of Kedah, 27th Sultan of Kedah (b. 1894).

== See also ==
- 1958
- 1957 in Malaysia | 1959 in Malaysia
- History of Malaysia
