= 1961 in Malaya =

- Decades: 1940s; 1950s; 1960s
- See also: Other events of 1961; History of Malaysia • Timeline • Years

This article lists important figures and events in Malayan public affairs during the year 1961, together with births and deaths of significant Malayans.

== Incumbent political figures ==
=== Federal level ===
- Yang di-Pertuan Agong: Tuanku Syed Putra of Perlis
- Raja Permaisuri Agong: Tengku Budriah of Perlis
- Prime Minister: Tunku Abdul Rahman Putra Al-Haj
- Deputy Prime Minister: Datuk Abdul Razak

=== State level ===
- Sultan of Johor: Sultan Ismail
- Sultan of Kedah: Sultan Abdul Halim Muadzam Shah
- Sultan of Kelantan: Sultan Yahya Petra
- Raja of Perlis: Tuanku Syed Sirajuddin (Regent)
- Sultan of Perak: Sultan Yusuf Izzuddin Shah
- Sultan of Pahang: Sultan Abu Bakar
- Sultan of Selangor: Sultan Salahuddin Abdul Aziz Shah
- Sultan of Terengganu: Sultan Ismail Nasiruddin Shah (Deputy Yang di-Pertuan Agong)
- Yang di-Pertuan Besar of Negeri Sembilan: Tuanku Munawir
- Yang di-Pertua Negeri (Governor) of Penang: Raja Tun Uda
- Yang di-Pertua Negeri (Governor) of Malacca: Tun Leong Yew Koh

(Source: Malaysian Department of Informations)

== Events ==
- 4 January – Tuanku Syed Putra of Perlis was installed as the third Yang di-Pertuan Agong.
- 20 February – Tunku Abdul Rahman planned to form a new federation called Malaysia with the merger of Malaya, Singapore, Sabah, Brunei, and Sarawak.
- 9 March – The International Quran Reading Competition was held for the first time.
- 17 April – Tuanku Munawir of Negeri Sembilan was installed as the ninth Yang di-Pertuan Besar of Negeri Sembilan
- 1 May – A landslide occurred in Ringlet, Cameron Highlands, Pahang.
- 28 June – Sultan Salahuddin Abdul Aziz Shah was crowned as the 8th Sultan of Selangor.
- July – The Control of Supplies Act 1961 was enacted.
- 17 July – Sultan Yahya Petra was crowned as the Sultan of Kelantan.
- 13 August – The construction of Malacca State Legislative Assembly in Malacca City, Malacca.
- 21 September – The Kidnapping Act 1961 was enacted.
- 30 October–18 November – The 13th Meeting of the Colombo Plan Consultative Committee was held in Kuala Lumpur.
- November – Actor and singers, P. Ramlee marries Singapore-born actor and singer, Saloma.

== Births ==
- 1 January – Zulkifli b. Omar – Jeneral of commissioner prison
- 9 January – Zahidi Zainul Abidin – Politician
- 22 January – P. Kalimuthu (Bentong Kali) – Criminal (died 1993)
- 15 February – Mr. Os – Actor and comedian (died 2016)
- 5 April – Habibah Abdul Rahim – Politician
- 6 May – Suhaili Abdul Rahman – Businessman
- 19 May – Sabree Fadzil – Actor
- 5 August – Hishammuddin Hussein – Politician and minister
- 31 August – Saleem – Singer
- 6 September – Francissca Peter – Singer
- 9 November – Zainal Abidin Hassan – Footballer
- 24 November – Takiyuddin Hassan – Politician
- 25 November – Salih Yaacob – Actor and comedian
- Unknown date – Mokhzani Mahathir – Politician and businessman
- Unknown date – Sabri Yunus – Actor and comedian

== Deaths ==
- 6 April – Woo Saik Hong, MCA Member of Parliament for Telok Anson (b. 1909).
- 26 April – Lu Baiye, Malayan Chinese writer (b. 1923).
- 12 August – Tan Kah Kee, businessman, philanthropist and Chinese community leader (b. 1874).

== See also ==
- 1961
- 1960 in Malaya | 1962 in Malaya
- History of Malaysia
