= Counter-terrorism in Malaysia =

Counter-terrorism in Malaysia is a series of measures implemented in Malaysia to detect and prevent terrorism as well as to minimise damages from such terrorist acts should they occur. These measures involve all levels of security services including military, police, border and infrastructure security, civil defence, medical readiness and psychological preparedness. Malaysia also participates actively in international counter-terrorism efforts. The Internal Security Act 1960 (ISA) was the first major anti-terrorism legislation in Malaysia. In 2012, it was replaced by Security Offences (Special Measures) Act 2012 (SOSMA).

== Need for legislation ==
Due to the nature of modern terrorism threats, it is no longer feasible to rely on the existing criminal law provisions. With information travel across the globe in a matter of minutes, evidences are getting more and more obscure and personal liberty is being misused, it is imperative for the Malaysian Government to enact a separate law to deal specifically with terrorism threats.

Generally, the need for anti-terrorism laws can be summarised as below:

- Provide legal framework for dealing with elements of violence, treachery and other actions, deemed detrimental to national security and public order.
- Empowering the Malaysian Government to undertake pre-emptive actions against perceived terrorism threats.
- Preservation of Malaysia's character as a multi-cultural and multi-religious nation, where preservation of peace is of paramount importance to ensure continued economic growth.
- Existing criminal laws may impede investigation due to bureaucratic processes and procedures.
- Provision for expanded scopes of investigation to cover intrusive surveillance, enhanced monitoring and prolonged detention that might contravene with the provision of Article 5 of the Federal Constitution.
- Underline the role of security forces, public prosecutors, judiciary and law practitioners in the event of invocation of such anti-terrorism laws.

Historically, Internal Security Act 1960 was enacted in 1960 by the administration of Tunku Abdul Rahman, then Federation of Malaya's Prime Minister to deal specifically with the threats of armed resistance from the communists. The main features of the Internal Security Act 1960 were:

- Detention without arrest warrant or trial.
- Detention period of up to 60 days, after which, the Home Minister may renew the period every 2 years.

The controversy surrounding the Internal Security Act 1960 led to the abolishment of the Act in 2012 by the administration of Dato' Seri Najib Tun Haji Razak and it is replaced by the Security Offences (Special Measures) Act 2012, with shorter detention period and more explicit terms related to the exclusion political activities from being subjected under the new Act. However, access to legal counsel (Section 5(1)(b)) can be delayed for up to 48-hours, subject to authorisation by a person not below the rank of Superintendent of Police (Section 5(2)).

== History of legislation ==
Prior to the enactment of the Internal Security Act 1960, there was no specific anti-terrorism legislation in place. The closest resemblance of an anti-terrorism provision is Chapter VI of the Penal Code (Act 574), related to offences against the state.

With the onset of World War II looming in the Pacific theatre, the Japanese army invaded Malaya on 8 December 1941. The Japanese Occupation of Malaya lasted for four years and throughout the occupation period, the Japanese army was constantly harassed by the Malayan People's Anti-Japanese Army (MPAJA), a group of resistance fighters from the Malayan Communist Party.

Following Japanese surrender on 16 August 1945 after the bombing of Hiroshima and Nagasaki, MPAJA fighters came out of their hideouts in the jungle and many were initially hailed as heroes. However, before the return of British forces to Malaya, MPAJA fighters began their reprisal campaign against Japanese collaborators and civilian population. When the British re-established their control of Malaya, the MPAJA was disbanded and arms returned to the British Military Administration (BMA), an interim administration outfit prior to the formation of Malayan Union.

During this period, the Malayan Communist Party began to become more anti-British. With the post-war world's economy still in its recovery period, the British administration in Malaya faced growing resentment, particularly from the labour unions. At this stage, the Malayan Communist Party played a significant role in supporting and leading labour unions and kept up the pressure on British colonial occupation. Following the assassination of three European planters in the State of Perak and proclamation of the state of emergency on 16 June 1948, the British Empire outlawed all left-wing groups in Malaya, including the Malayan Communist Party. Many party members were arrested while others went into hiding in the jungle to avoid arrest. These events led to Malayan communist founding the Malayan National Liberation Army (MNLA) which sought to gain independence for Malaya from the British Empire and transform the country into a socialist republic.

The British administration was constantly ambushed by the communists during the period of 1949 to 1955. In 1955, the first general election of Malaya was held and Tunku Abdul Rahman became the first Chief Minister of the Federation of Malaya. Towards the end of 1955, the Federal Government held a peace talk with the Malayan Communist Party, which broke down due to the refusal of the Federal Government to legally recognise the party and demanded its dissolution. The fight continued until the Federation of Malaya achieved her independence on 31 August 1957.

The Malayan Emergency was declared over on 31 July 1960 and the first anti-terrorism law was enacted in the same year, known as the Internal Security Act 1960, to provide sweeping power to the Federal Government to deal with the threats of armed communists resistance.

With the cessation of armed communist resistance, formalised through the peace agreement between the Malaysian government and Malayan Communist Party on 2 December 1989, critics argued that the Internal Security Act 1960 was no longer relevant and should be repealed. Under the administration of Mahathir Mohamad and Abdullah Ahmad Badawi, the Internal Security Act 1960 has been invoked on a number of occasions to quell dissidents. This has prompted the United States to express concern over the use of the law.

In 2011, the administration of Najib Razak agreed to repeal the Internal Security Act 1960, after facing growing disapproval from members of the opposition parties and civil groups. The Internal Security Act 1960 has been replaced by Security Offences (Special Measures) Act 2012.

== Effectiveness of legislation ==
Malaysia has been largely spared from any major terrorism incidence since the signing of peace accord with the Malayan Communist Party. However, after the terrorist attack on World Trade Centre and Pentagon in the United States on 11 September 2001, Malaysia is facing growing threats from regional terrorist groups, the most notable is Jemaah Islamiyah (JI). The effectiveness of anti-terrorism efforts in Malaysia is dependent on cross-agencies co-operation as well as international co-operation in terms of intelligence sharing and training in handling the threats of terrorism.

== Agencies involved ==
- Malaysian Special Branch - Providing internal and external intelligence on security threats.
- Royal Malaysia Police - Enforcement of provision of law and providing logistic and handling of terrorist suspects.
- Southeast Asia Regional Centre for Counter-Terrorism (SEARCCT) - providing training and enhancing the capacity of enforcement, security and government officials on counter-terrorism issues.

== Timeline ==
These are the events related to terrorism and counter-terrorism in Malaysia. Also listed are major terrorist incidents in the Malaysia that have influenced counter-terrorism policies in Malaysia.

=== 1940s ===
- June 1948 – The gunmen from Malayan Communist Party (MCP) killing three Europeans planters, resulting the Malayan Emergency was declared on 16 June in Perak state and 19 June at Johore state as well as 7 July at all states of Malaya.
- 16 June 1948 – State of Emergency was declared, marking the beginning of the Malayan Emergency.

=== 1950s ===
- 23 February 1950 – Bukit Kepong Police Station in Muar, Johor was attacked by the 180 communist guerrillas, killing 14 police officers, eight auxiliary police officers and four family members, four officers wounded.
- 25 March 1950 – MNLA guerrillas ambushed the Platoon 12, Delta Company of 3rd Malay Regiment Battalion at Semur River, Kelantan, killing 17 soldiers and nine more captured. The platoon successfully killed 29 gunmen during the battle.
- 6 October 1951 – British High Commissioner, Sir Henry Gurney was ambushed by MCP guerrillas at Fraser Hill, with fatality this Commissioner and other police officers wounded in action.
- 28–29 December 1955 – Peace talk between Federation of Malaya Government and Malayan Communist Party in Baling, Kedah.

=== 1960s ===
- 1 August 1960 – Enactment of the Internal Security Act 1960 by the Federation of Malaya Parliament.
- 16 September 1963 – Application of the Internal Security Act 1960 was expanded to Sabah, Sarawak and Singapore.
- 7 May 1965 – An army elite Grup Gerak Khas was formed
- 23 October 1969 – An elite 69 Commando (Malay: Komando 69) of Royal Malaysia Police was formed under training by British 22nd SAS Regiment.

=== 1970s ===
- 7 June 1974 – Inspector General of Police, Tan Sri Abd. Rahman Bin Hashim was murdered by a communist guerrilla in Kuala Lumpur.
- 1 January 1975 – An elite Special Actions Unit (Malay: Unit Tindakhas–UTK) of Royal Malaysia Police was formed in secret.
- 5 August 1975 – The Japanese Red Army terrorists attacked the AIA Building in Jalan Ampang, Kuala Lumpur, holding more than 50 people hostage.
- 27 August 1975 – A bomb exploded at the National Monument, Kuala Lumpur, causing extensive damage to the monument.
- 13 November 1975 – The Perak State of Police Commissioner, DCP Tan Sri Khoo Chong Kong and his driver, Sergeant Yeung Peng Chong was murdered by two communist subversives at Fair Park, Anderson Street, Ipoh, Perak during en route to police headquarters after going to lunch.
- 4 December 1977 – Malaysia Airlines Flight 653 was hijacked by a suspected Japanese Red Army terrorist, en route to Singapore International Airport. The flight crashed at Tanjung Kupang in the State of Johor, killing all passengers. The case remain unresolved.

=== 1980s ===
- 1 April 1980 – An elite HANDAU of Royal Malaysian Air Force was formed.
- 1 October 1982 – An elite PASKAL of Royal Malaysian Navy was formed.
- 19 November 1985 – The Malaysian Government laid siege to a village in Memali, Baling, Kedah as a local religious preacher, Ibrahim Mahmud a.k.a. Ibrahim Libya was accused of spreading deviant teaching and challenging the integrity of the Federal Government. The incident resulted in the death of 14 civilians and 4 policemen.
- 23 November 1985 – About 15-20 armed pirates from the southern Philippines landed on the coast of Lahad Datu and firing at random, killing at least 21 peoples including one pregnant woman and injuring 11 others, and snatched some RM200,000 from a local bank as well as another RM5,000 from the Malaysia Airlines office.
- 24 November 1985 – The marine police and navy intercepted the Moro pirates, resulted in the death of five perpetrators and two more wounded during the gun battle.
- 2 December 1989 – Peace accord between Malaysian Government and Malayan Communist Party was signed in Hatyai, Thailand.

=== 1990s ===
- An army counter-terrorism force 11th Rejimen Gerak Khas (RGK) was formed under training by British 22nd SAS.
- 1 June 1993 – Royal Malaysian Air Force restructured the elite force and changed the name of HANDAU with the newly name known as PASKAU.
- 20 October 1997 – Pasukan Gerakan Khas (PGK) was formed, combining the 69 Commando (VAT-69) and Special Actions Unit under one wing.

=== 2000s ===
- 23 April 2000 – Six men of Abu Sayyaf guerillas armed with assault rifles and several rocket-propelled grenades kidnapping 21 peoples include 11 Malaysians, three Germans, two French, two South Africans, two Finnish and a Lebanese citizen as well as two Filipino resort workers at Sipadan resort island off the eastern coast of Borneo.
- 3 July 2000 – A terrorist group known as Al-Ma'unah stole over 111 military firearms and ammunitions at two control posts at the Kuala Rui Territorial Army Camp, Perak and hid in the jungle at Bukit Jenalik, Sauk, Perak.
- 4 November – State Assemblyman for Lunas state constituency in Kedah, Dr. Joe Fernandez was shot dead by a suspected member of a religious terrorist group.
- 4 August 2001 – 75 members of a nascent militant group, Kumpulan Militan Malaysia (KMM) were arrested. Top leaders, Dr. Azahari Husin and Noordin Muhammad Top fled to Indonesia. Also arrested was Nik Adli Nik Abdul Aziz, the son of Kelantan's Chief Minister.
- 11 September 2001 – Following al-Qaeda's attack on the World Trade Center and the Pentagon, Yazid Sufaat and Suhaimi Mokhtar were arrested in Malaysia for their roles in the attack.
- 12 October 2002 – Malaysia arrested 6 members of Jemaah Islamiah in connection with terrorist attack in Bali, Indonesia.
- 15 February 2005 – The first Malaysian coast guard named Malaysian Maritime Enforcement Agency (MMEA) was formed.
- 25 April 2005 – An elite Special Task and Rescue of MMEA was formed.
- 3 October 2005 – An elite Rapid Actions Troop of Malaysian Prison Department was formed.
- March 2006 – An elite Marine Combat Unit of Royal Malaysia Police was formed.
- 1 April 2009 – A Jemaah Islamiah leader, Mas Selamat was arrested at Kampung Tawakal, Skudai, Johor Bahru. He escaped from Whitley Detention Centre in Singapore on 27 February 2008.

=== 2010s ===
- 15 September 2011 – Former Malaysian Prime Minister, Najib Tun Razak announced the repeal of the Internal Security Act 1960.
- 22 June 2012 – Security Offences (Special Measures) Act 2012 (Act 747) was gazetted.
- 8 February 2013 – Yazid Sufaat and Halimah Hussein were arrested for "inciting terrorist acts at a house in Ampang between August and October 2012".
- 11 February 2013 – An around 235 militants calling themselves as the Royal Security Forces of the Sultanate of Sulu and North Borneo (led by Agbimuddin Kiram) arrived by boats in the village of Tanduo, near Tungku in Lahad Datu district, Sabah from neighbouring Simunul island, Tawi-Tawi of southern Philippines, resulting the 2013 Lahad Datu standoff was declared.
- 1 March 2013 – Two police officers being gunned down and three more officers wounded in an unexpected "white flag" ambush by armed gunmen in Tanduo. 12 militants also killed with four more injured as a result of the skirmish.
- 2 March 2013 – An armed gunmen believed to be less than 10 in number armed with automatic rifles such as AK-47 and M16 ambushed the police officers during a surveillance operation at Kampung Sri Jaya, Simunul, Semporna, Sabah with six officers fatalities in an assault. Six militants were fatally shots after the remaining officers launched the counter-attack for self-defence.
- 3 March 2013 – One of remaining militants who were responsible for killing the police officers at Semporna, Sabah were beaten to death by villagers after he attempted to take them as a hostages.
- January 2014 – Formation of an elite unit of the Malaysian Immigration Department known as the Special Tactical Group (Malay: Grup Taktikal Khas)
- 13 July 2014 – An armed militants suspected from the Abu Sayyaf attack a resort house at Mabul Island, Semporna, killing one marine police officer with the other been kidnapped. The officer was rescued seven months later. This incident was the first fatality involving security forces for preventing kidnapping.
- 6 April 2015 – Malaysian authorities arrest seventeen suspected Islamic State of Iraq and the Levant (ISIS) militants who were involved in an alleged terror plot in the Kuala Lumpur capital.
- 7 April 2015 – The Malaysian House of Representatives (Malay: Dewan Rakyat) passes the Prevention of Terrorism Act by 70-69 votes.
- 27 April 2015 – Police arrested 12 suspected IS militants.
- 15 May 2015 – An armed Abu Sayyaf militias kidnapping an owner of Ocean King Seafood Restaurant, Thien Nyuk Fun, 50, and a Sarawakian, Bernard Then, 39, at this restaurant in Sandakan. The kidnappers brought them via boat to Jolo island in southern Philippines. Thien was released on 8 November for 30 million peso as a ransom but Bernard has been murdered on 17 November.
- 28 June 2016 – Two attackers suspected from the IS militants threw a hand grenades into the Movida Bar, located in the suburb of Kuala Lumpur, injuring eight people, including one foreigner from China. Two IS attackers has been arrested on 4 July.
- 27 October 2016 - The government of Malaysia formed the Malaysian SOCOM, known as National Special Operations Force (NSOF), comprising the main special ops elements of military, police and coast guard under one formation.
- 13 February 2017 – The half-brother of North Korean chairman Kim Jong-un, Kim Jong-nam was allegedly murdered by two women in Malaysia with VX nerve agent, during his return trip to Macau at klia2, the low-cost carrier terminal of the Kuala Lumpur International Airport. Following Kim's death, police arrested three suspects, one Vietnamese women, one Indonesian women and her boyfriend, a Malaysian as well as a North Korean man.
- 30 August 2017 - Police foiled a terrorist plot on the closing ceremony of the SEA Games in Bukit Jalil and the 60th National Day parade in Merdeka Square after arresting 19 suspects of terrorist including eight members of Abu Sayyaff group and one suspect of Bangladeshi Jamaat-ul-Mujahideen group in separate operations in Kuala Lumpur, Selangor, Kelantan and Johore.

== Counter-terrorist specialised units ==
At the forefront of the battle against terrorism are specialised military, law enforcement, and civil defence units, namely:

- 11th Rejimen Gerak Khas
- Alpha Platoon of PASKAL
- Flight Hostage Rescue Team PASKAU
- Counter-Revolutionary Warfare 69 Commando of PGK
- Special Actions Unit of PGK
- Special Task and Rescue

== See also ==
- Terrorism in Malaysia
- Malaysian Special Operations Force
- List of active separatist movements in Asia § Malaysia
- History of the Republic of Singapore § Independence from Malaysia
