= 1959 in Malaya =

- Decades: 1930s; 1940s; 1950s; 1960s
- See also: Other events of 1959; History of Malaysia • Timeline • Years

This article lists important figures and events in Malayan public affairs during the year 1959, together with births and deaths of significant Malayans.

== Incumbent political figures ==
=== Federal level ===
- Yang di-Pertuan Agong: Tuanku Abdul Rahman of Negeri Sembilan
- Raja Permaisuri Agong: Tuanku Kurshiah of Negeri Sembilan
- Prime Minister: Tunku Abdul Rahman Putra Al-Haj
- Deputy Prime Minister: Datuk Abdul Razak

=== State level ===
- Sultan of Johor:
  - Sultan Ibrahim (until 1959)
  - Sultan Ismail (from 1959)
- Sultan of Kedah: Sultan Abdul Halim Muadzam Shah
- Sultan of Kelantan: Sultan Ibrahim
- Raja of Perlis: Tuanku Syed Putra
- Sultan of Perak: Sultan Yusuf Izzuddin Shah
- Sultan of Pahang: Sultan Abu Bakar
- Sultan of Selangor: Sultan Hisamuddin Alam Shah
- Sultan of Terengganu: Sultan Ismail Nasiruddin Shah
- Yang di-Pertuan Besar of Negeri Sembilan: Tengku Munawir (Regent)
- Yang di-Pertua Negeri (Governor) of Penang: Raja Tun Uda
- Yang di-Pertua Negeri (Governor) of Malacca: Tun Leong Yew Koh

(Source: Malaysian Department of Informations)

== Events ==
- January – La Salle School, Petaling Jaya was established by De La Salle Brothers.
- 26 January – The Central Bank of Malaya (Bank Negara Tanah Melayu) was founded.
- 19 February – The Election Offences (Amendment) Ordinance 1959 was enacted.
- 20 February – Sultan Abdul Halim Muadzam Shah was installed as Sultan of Kedah
- 11 March – The Malayan Federation Royal Police Memorial Monument at Police Training Academy (now PULAPOL) Kuala Lumpur was officialized.
- 1 April – The Prevention of Crime Act 1959 was enacted.
- 24 April – The last meeting of the Federal Legislative Council before being replaced by the Malayan Parliament.
- 1 May – The Immigration Ordinance 1959 was enacted.
- 8 May – Sultan Ibrahim Al-Masyhur of Johor died at the age of 86 in London, England. His body was brought back to Johor and laid to rest at Mahmoodiah Royal Mausoleum, Johor Bahru. His son, Tunku Ismail was proclaimed as the 23rd Sultan of Johor and 3rd in the modern Sultan of Johor.
- 19 August – The 1959 General Elections was held for the first time since independence on 31 August 1957.
- 12 September – The first Malayan Parliament was opened by the Yang di-Pertuan Agong.
- 12–17 December – Malaya competed at the first edition of the SEA Games in 1959 Southeast Asian Peninsular Games held in Bangkok, Thailand. The Malayan team won 8 gold medals, 15 silver medals, 11 bronze medal and ranked overall at third place.
- Unknown date – Pahang FA was founded.

== Sports ==
- 18–26 April – 1959 AFC Youth Championship

== Births ==
- 6 January – Adnan Abu Hassan – Composer and musician (died 2016)
- 5 February – Azhar Mansor – First Malaysian sailoring around the world
- 3 March – Kamarlin Ombi – Politician
- 11 April – Md Sirat Abu – Politician
- 7 May – Jamal Abdillah – Singer
- 19 May – Harun Salim Bachik – Actor (died 2015)
- 13 July – Fuziah Salleh – Politician
- 15 July – Ellron Alfred Angin – Politician
- 30 July – Al-Sultan Abdullah ibni Sultan Ahmad Shah – 16th Yang di-Pertuan Agong of Malaysia
- 14 August – Raja Zarith Sofiah – Permaisuri of Johor
- 15 September – Bung Mokhtar Radin – Politician
- 4 October – Nashrudin Elias (Nash) – Singer and musician
- 14 October – Husam Musa – Politician
- 4 November – Zainal Abidin Mohamad – Singer
- 3 December – Jemilah Mahmood – Physician, humanitarian activist and founder of Mercy Malaysia
- 13 December – Imuda – Actor and comedian
- 19 December – Ebby Saiful – Singer, actor

== Deaths ==
- 6 March – Siew Mah, MNLA Commander who lead during the Assassination of Sir Henry Gurney (b. 1919).
- 15 April – Abdul Wahab Abdul Aziz, 1st Menteri Besar of Perak (b. 1905).
- 8 May – Sultan Ibrahim of Johor, 2nd Sultan of Modern Johor (b. 1873).
- 4 June – John Thivy, founder and 1st President of the Malayan Indian Congress (b. 1904).
- 21 June – Syed Oun Habib Abdul Rani, former Member of the Dewan Negara (b. 1905).
- 22 August – William George Maxwell, British colonial administrator (b. 1871).

== See also ==
- 1959
- 1958 in Malaya | 1960 in Malaya
- History of Malaysia
