= 1960 in Malaya =

- Decades: 1940s; 1950s; 1960s
- See also: Other events of 1960; History of Malaysia • Timeline • Years

This article lists important figures and events in Malayan public affairs during the year 1960, together with births and deaths of significant Malayans.

== Incumbent political figures ==
=== Federal level ===
- Yang di-Pertuan Agong:
  - Tuanku Abdul Rahman of Negeri Sembilan (until 4 April)
  - Sultan Hisamuddin Alam Shah of Selangor (from 14 April until 1 September)
  - Tuanku Syed Putra of Perlis (from 21 September)
- Raja Permaisuri Agong:
  - Tuanku Kurshiah of Negeri Sembilan (until 4 April)
  - Tengku Ampuan Jemaah of Selangor (from 14 April until 1 September)
  - Tengku Budriah of Perlis (from 21 September)
- Prime Minister: Tunku Abdul Rahman
- Deputy Prime Minister: Datuk Abdul Razak

=== State level ===
- Sultan of Johor: Sultan Ismail
- Sultan of Kedah: Sultan Abdul Halim Muadzam Shah
- Sultan of Kelantan:
  - Sultan Ibrahim (until November)
  - Sultan Yahya Petra (from November)
- Raja of Perlis: Tuanku Syed Sirajuddin (Regent from 21 September)
- Sultan of Perak: Sultan Yusuf Izzuddin Shah
- Sultan of Pahang: Sultan Abu Bakar
- Sultan of Selangor:
  - Tengku Abdul Aziz Shah (Regent from 14 April until 1 September)
  - Sultan Salahuddin Abdul Aziz Shah (from 1 September)
- Sultan of Terengganu: Sultan Ismail Nasiruddin Shah (Deputy Yang di-Pertuan Agong)
- Yang di-Pertuan Besar of Negeri Sembilan: Tuanku Munawir (Regent until 4 April)
- Yang di-Pertua Negeri (Governor) of Penang: Raja Tun Uda
- Yang di-Pertua Negeri (Governor) of Malacca: Tun Leong Yew Koh

(Source: Malaysian Department of Informations)

== Events ==
- February – The first FELDA settlers arrived in Lurah Bilut, Pahang.
- 6 February – Diocese of Singapore and Malaya was founded, renamed from Diocese of Singapore.
- 10 February – Sultan Ismail was crowned as Sultan of Johor.
- 4 April – Tuanku Abdul Rahman of Negeri Sembilan, the first Yang di-Pertuan Agong died. His body was brought back to Negeri Sembilan and buried at Seri Menanti Royal Mausoleum, Seri Menanti.
- 7 April – World Refugee Year was commemorated on a Malayan stamp.
- 14 April – Sultan Hisamuddin Alam Shah of Selangor became the second Yang di-Pertuan Agong.
- 27 May – First Malayan Hajj Pilgrimage to Mecca.
- 31 May – Malayan Banking Berhad was incorporated.
- 28 July – The Chinese Hibiscus became the Malayan national flower and renamed Bunga Raya.
- 31 July – The second Yang di-Pertuan Agong, Sultan Hisamuddin Alam Shah of Selangor declared the state of emergency ended. A victory parade was held in Kuala Lumpur.
- 1 August – The Internal Security Act 1960 was enacted. This act was repealed in 2012.
- 25 August–11 September – Malaya competed at the 1960 Summer Olympics in Rome, Italy. Nine competitors, all men, took part in eleven events in four sports.
- 1 September - The second Yang di-Pertuan Agong, Sultan Hisamuddin Alam Shah of Selangor died of a mysterious illness before his installation. His body was brought back to Selangor and buried at royal mausoleum near Sultan Sulaiman Mosque, Klang.
- 19 September – The Natural Rubber Research of Conference was held in Kuala Lumpur.
- 21 September – Tuanku Syed Putra of Perlis was elected as the third Yang di-Pertuan Agong.
- 5 October – The Congo Peacekeeping Mission (1960–1962): Malaya sent 1,947 personnel as part of the United Nations Operation in the Congo or ONUC.
- 25 October – The Kuala Lumpur British Royal Air Force base was officially handed over to the Malayan Royal Air Force.
- Unknown date – The Bible College of Malaysia was established as the Bible Institute of Malaya by the Assemblies of God of Malaysia.

== Sports ==
- 30 March–7 April – 1960 AFC Youth Championship

== Births ==
- 16 January – Wan Mohammad Khair-il Anuar Wan Ahmad – Politician (died 2016)
- 18 January – Ismail Sabri Yaakob – Politician and 9th Prime Minister of Malaysia
- 6 February – Abdul Razak Baginda – Former political analyst
- 17 February – Misbun Sidek – Legendary badminton player
- 22 March – Anthony Kevin Morais – Deputy public prosecutor (murder victim, died 2015)
- 26 May – Leong Yong Kong – politician
- 1 July – Nasir Bilal Khan – Actor
- 7 December – Rosli Rahman Adam – Actor and theater activist
- 8 December – Lim Guan Eng – Politician, Former Finance Minister and 4th Chief Minister of Penang

== Deaths ==
- 21 January – Wu Lien-teh, physician (b. 1879).
- 1 April – Tuanku Abdul Rahman, 1st Yang di-Pertuan Agong of Malaya (b. 1895).
- 3 June – Syed Abdul Kadir Mohamed, 8th Menteri Besar of Johor (b. 1900).
- 10 June – Raja Permaisuri Che Teh binte Abdullah, widow of Sultan Iskandar of Perak (b. 1868).
- 28 June – Musa Yusof, Johor royal court official (b. 1888).
- 9 July – Sultan Ibrahim ibni Almarhum Sultan Muhammad IV, 26th Sultan of Kelantan (b. 1897).
- 1 September – Sultan Hisamuddin Alam Shah, 2nd Yang di-Pertuan Agong of Malaya (b. 1898).
- 13 December – Tun Tan Cheng Lock, founder of the Malayan Chinese Association (b. 1883).

== See also ==
- 1960
- 1959 in Malaya | 1961 in Malaya
- History of Malaysia
