= 1956 in Malaya =

- Decades: 1930s; 1940s; 1950s; 1960s
- See also: Other events of 1956; History of Malaysia • Timeline • Years

This article lists important figures and events in Malayan public affairs during the year 1956, together with births and deaths of significant Malayans.

== Incumbent political figures ==
=== Central level ===
- Governor of Malaya :
  - Donald Charles MacGillivray
- Chief Minister Federation of Malaya :
  - Tunku Abdul Rahman Putra Al-Haj

=== State level ===
- Perlis :
  - Raja of Perlis : Syed Harun Putra Jamalullail
  - Menteri Besar of Perlis : Raja Ahmad Raja Endut
- Johore :
  - Sultan of Johor : Sultan Ibrahim Al-Masyhur
  - Menteri Besar of Johor : Wan Idris Ibrahim
- Kedah :
  - Sultan of Kedah : Sultan Badlishah
  - Menteri Besar of Kedah : Tunku Ismail Tunku Yahya
- Kelantan :
  - Sultan of Kelantan : Sultan Ibrahim
  - Menteri Besar of Kelantan : Tengku Muhammad Hamzah Raja Muda Long Zainal Abidin
- Terengganu :
  - Sultan of Terengganu : Sultan Ismail Nasiruddin Shah
  - Menteri Besar of Terengganu : Raja Kamaruddin Idris
- Selangor :
  - Sultan of Selangor : Sultan Sir Hishamuddin Alam Shah Al-Haj
  - Menteri Besar of Selangor : Raja Uda Raja Muhammad
- Penang :
  - Monarchs : Queen Elizabeth II
  - Residents-Commissioner : Robert Porter Bingham
- Malacca :
  - Monarchs : Queen Elizabeth II
  - Residents-Commissioner : Maurice John Hawyard (Acting)
- Negri Sembilan :
  - Yang di-Pertuan Besar of Negeri Sembilan : Tuanku Abdul Rahman ibni Almarhum Tuanku Muhammad
  - Menteri Besar Negeri Sembilan : Shamsuddin Naim
- Pahang :
  - Sultan of Pahang : Sultan Abu Bakar
  - Menteri Besar of Pahang : Tengku Mohamad Sultan Ahmad
- Perak :
  - British Adviser of Perak : Ian Blelloch (until unknown date, position abolished)
  - Sultan of Perak : Sultan Yusuf Izzuddin Shah
  - Menteri Besar of Perak : Abdul Wahab Toh Muda Abdul Aziz

== Events ==
- 8 February – The Treaty of London 1956 was signed to set up the independent Federation of Malaya
- 20 February – Tunku Abdul Rahman announced in Malacca Town after he returned from London that Malaya would become independent on 31 August 1957.
- March – The Rural and Industrial Development Authority (RIDA) Training Centre (Dewan Latehan RIDA) was established.
- March – Reid Commission is established for drafting the Constitution of the Federation of Malaya .
- 22 June – Dewan Bahasa dan Pustaka was established as Balai Pustaka in Johor Bahru.
- 22 June – Pipeline ambush.
- 1 July – The Federal Land Development Authority (FELDA) was established.
- 24 October – Malayan Party was established by Tan Gee Gak.
- 22 November-8 December – Malaya competed for the first time in 1956 Olympic Games at Melbourne, Australia. 32 competitors, 31 men and 1 woman, took part in 13 events in 5 sports.
- Unknown date – Catholic High School, Petaling Jaya is founded by Rev. Bro. Philippe Wu of the Marist Brothers.

== Births ==
- 1 January – Mona Fandey – Singer and witchcraft involved in murdering Mazlan Idris in 1993 (died by hanging 2001)
- 8 February – Raja Iskandar Dzulkarnain – Raja Di-Hilir Perak
- 2 May – Mohamad bin Hasan – Politician
- 10 July – K. Rajagopal – Coach and footballer
- 11 September – Mohd Hatta Ramli – Politician
- 2 November – Arif Shah Omar Shah – Politician
- 15 November – Ong Ka Ting – Politician
- 27 November – Sultan Nazrin Muizuddin Shah – 35th Sultan of Perak
- Unknown date – Louisa Chong – Actor

== Deaths ==
- January 22 – Tun Yusuf
- August 26 – Yeung Kwo – Deputy Secretary General of the Malayan Communist Party

== See also ==
- 1956
- 1955 in Malaya | 1957 in Malaya
- History of Malaysia
