= 1955 in Malaya =

- Decades: 1930s; 1940s; 1950s; 1960s
- See also: Other events of 1955; History of Malaysia • Timeline • Years

This article lists important figures and events in Malayan public affairs during the year 1955, as well as births and deaths of significant Malayans.

== Incumbent political figures ==
=== Central level ===
- Governor of Malaya :
  - Donald Charles MacGillivray
- Chief Minister Federation of Malaya :
  - Tunku Abdul Rahman Putra Al-Haj

=== State level ===
- Perlis :
  - Raja of Perlis : Syed Harun Putra Jamalullail
  - Menteri Besar of Perlis : Raja Ahmad Raja Endut
- Johore :
  - Sultan of Johor : Sultan Ibrahim Al-Masyhur
  - Menteri Besar of Johor :
    - Syed Abdul Kadir Mohamed (until 5 June)
    - Vacant (from 5 June to 1 October)
    - Wan Idris Ibrahim (from 1 October)
- Kedah :
  - Sultan of Kedah : Sultan Badlishah
  - Menteri Besar of Kedah : Tunku Ismail Tunku Yahya
- Kelantan :
  - Sultan of Kelantan : Sultan Ibrahim
  - Menteri Besar of Kelantan : Tengku Muhammad Hamzah Raja Muda Long Zainal Abidin
- Trengganu :
  - Sultan of Trengganu : Sultan Ismail Nasiruddin Shah
  - Menteri Besar of Terengganu : Raja Kamaruddin Idris
- Selangor :
  - Sultan of Selangor : Sultan Sir Hishamuddin Alam Shah Al-Haj
  - Menteri Besar of Selangor :
    - Raja Uda Raja Muhammad (until August)
    - Abdul Aziz Abdul Majid (from August)
- Penang :
  - Monarchs : Queen Elizabeth II
  - Residents-Commissioner : Robert Porter Bingham
- Malacca :
  - Monarchs : Queen Elizabeth II
  - Residents-Commissioner : Maurice John Hawyard (Acting)
- Negri Sembilan :
  - Yang di-Pertuan Besar of Negeri Sembilan : Tuanku Abdul Rahman ibni Almarhum Tuanku Muhammad
  - Menteri Besar Negeri Sembilan : Shamsuddin Naim
- Pahang :
  - Sultan of Pahang : Sultan Abu Bakar
  - Menteri Besar of Pahang :
    - Tengku Mohamad Sultan Ahmad (until 1 February)
    - Abdul Razak Hussein (from 1 February to 15 June)
    - Tengku Mohamad Sultan Ahmad (from 15 June)
- Perak :
  - British Adviser of Perak : Ian Blelloch
  - Sultan of Perak : Sultan Yusuf Izzuddin Shah
  - Menteri Besar of Perak : Abdul Wahab Toh Muda Abdul Aziz

== Events ==
- 8 January – Sabak Bernam declared as a white area (free from the communist insurgency) during the Malayan Emergency.
- 12 January – Setapak High School was founded.
- 4 April – Sultan Alam Shah Islamic College was founded.
- May – Malacca state declared as a white area (free from the communist insurgency) during the Malayan Emergency.
- 4–5 June – 1955 Thomas Cup. Malaya winner this edition defeated Denmark.
- 27 July – First General Elections in Malaya. Alliance Party (Parti Perikatan) won 51 parliament seats of 52.
- 9 August – Tunku Abdul Rahman formed the first Rahman cabinet after being invited to begin a new government following the 27 July general election
- 11 August – A Rhodesian soldier named Shaweleka Fungabelo killed six people and wounded at least twelve people on a mail train travelling from Kuala Lumpur to Singapore before committing suicide.
- 11 November – The Malayan People's Party was formed.
- 27 November – A rally is held in Kuala Lumpur to urge CPM members to surrender and end the Malayan Emergency.
- 5 December – Federal Reserve Unit (FRU) is established.
- 28–29 December – Baling Talks is held to attempt resolve Malayan Emergency.
- Unknown date – Central Provident Fund is established.
- Unknown date – The International School of Penang (Uplands) was founded.
- Unknown date – Kolej Islam Malaya was established before change name to Universiti Islam Malaysia.
- Unknown date – Ministry of Education (Malaysia) is formed.
- Unknown date – YTL Corporation Berhad was founded by Yeoh Tiong Lay.

== Births ==
- 14 January – Raja Kamarul Bahrin Shah Raja Ahmad – Architect and construction expert
- 25 January – SM Nasimuddin SM Amin – Entrepreneur and founder of Naza group (died 2008)
- 9 May – Rosnah Mat Aris – Actor
- 10 May – Hajiji Noor – politician
- 31 May – Kartina Aziz – Actor
- 21 July – Danial Zainal Abidin – Motivator and muslim clerics
- 14 August – Jamilah Anu – Politician and Adenan Satem wife
- 29 August – Ali Hamsa – Politician, Chief Secretary to the Government of Malaysia (died 2022)
- 24 September – Rahim Maarof – Singer
- 6 October – Abdul Gani Patail – Former Attorney General of Malaysia
- 24 October Rehman Rashid – Writer and journalist (dies 2017)
- 15 November – Idris bin Jusoh – Politician

== Deaths ==
- November 8 – Musa Ghiatuddin Riayat Shah of Selangor, 7th Sultan of Selangor (b. 1893)

=== Dates unknown ===
- Chen Lu, Member of the Central Committee of the Malayan Communist Party (b. 1918)
- Jamal bin Haji Sulaiman, leader of the 10th Malay Regiment in Johor (b. 1918)

== See also ==
- 1955
- 1954 in Malaya | 1956 in Malaya
- History of Malaysia
