= Sadayandy Batumalai =

Malaysian Christian theologian

Sadayandy Batumalai (born 1946) is a Malaysian Christian theologian.

== Biography ==
Batumalai was born in Perak to a Tamil background. He completed his PhD in the University of Birmingham, writing a thesis on "Christian Prophecy and Intercession: The Bible, Barth and Koyama in Relation to Contemporary Malaysia." After completing his doctorate, he returned to Malaysia and taught at the Seminari Theologi Malaysia (1984–1990), and served as dean (1986–1990). He taught for a year at the College of the Ascension Selly Oak Colleges (1990–1991), before returning to Malaysia where he served as vicar of the Church of St John the Divine and Archdeacon of Perak (1991–2000) and was vicar of Christ Church Melaka and Archdeacon of Johor, Melaka, and Nefri Sembilan (2000–2011).

Batumalai is known for developing Christian theological responses to the Muslim majority in Malaysia. Drawing from Kosuke Koyama's notion of "neighborology" as an understanding of Christ's teachings of loving one's neighbors, Batumalai prioritizes a concern for Muslim neighbors as opposed to a simple focus on conversion. He also speaks about extending muhibbah to Muslims, drawing on an Arabic notion of communal solidarity or "goodwill".

== Works ==
- Batumalai, Sadayandy (1986). A Prophetic Christology for Neighbourology: A Theology for a Prophetic Living. Seminari Theoloji Malaysia.
- Batumalai, Sadayandy (1990). A Malaysian Theology of Muhibbah: A Theology for a Christian. Seminari Theoloji Malaysia.
- Batumalai, Sadayandy (2007). A Bicentenary History of the Anglican Church of the Diocese of West Malaysia, (1805-2005): In the Province of South East Asia. S. Batumalai.
- Batumalai, Sadayandy (2011). The 50 Years' Pilgrimage of a Malaysian Christian: An Autobiography. S. Batumalai. OCLC 948652472.
