= Terrorism in Malaysia =

This article is about the extent of terrorism in Malaysia, including historical background, laws concerning terrorism, incidence of terrorism and international terrorism from the Malaysian perspective.

== Etymology ==
=== Definition of terrorism in Malaysia ===
The international community has not been able to come to a universally-accepted definition of terrorism. The difficulty in defining terrorism stem from the fact that it is politically and emotionally charged. The history of terrorism incidence in Northern Ireland, Middle East and South East Asia indicate that terrorism is perpetrated by a group of aggrieved people that see violence as the only means of achieving their political goals. The loose definition of terrorism resulted in the execution of State-sanctioned terrorism as well as acts of terror carried out by militant groups, each trying to legitimise their act of terror.

=== Linguistic definition ===
Linguistically, terrorism is defined as:

- Use of violence and threats to intimidate or coerce, especially for political purposes
- State of fear and submission produced by terrorism or terrorisation
- Terroristic method of governing or of resisting a government

=== Malaysia's effort in defining terrorism ===
After the 11 September 2001 terrorist attacks in the United States, Malaysia has actively emphasised on the need to define terrorism in view of increasingly discriminatory environment against the Muslims. During the Organisation of Islamic Conference (OIC) meeting on 4 April 2002 in Kuala Lumpur, Malaysia's Prime Minister at the time Mahathir Mohamad proposed 'a definition for terrorism encompassing all violence targeted at civilians, which he said included 11 September attacks, Palestinian suicide bombers as well as assaults by Israel in the Palestinian territories'. However, the proposal was met with resistance from the Arab countries, for fear that it will criminalise the Palestinian struggle for statehood.

=== Terrorism definition in Malaysia's Anti-Terrorism Legislation ===
The Security Offences (Special Measures) Act 2012 (Act 747) was enacted to specifically deal with terrorism. Under the Act, the following actions warrant the invocation of the law:

- To cause, or to cause a substantial number of citizens to fear, organised violence against persons or property
- To excite disaffection against the Yang di-Pertuan Agong (Supreme Ruler)
- Which is prejudicial to public order in, or the security of, the Federation or any part thereof
- Procure the alteration, otherwise than by lawful means, of anything by law established

Act 747 makes further reference to Chapter VI of the Penal Code (Act 574) that provides the basis for arrest for offences committed against the Federation.

However, the now-repealed Internal Security Act 1960 (Act 82) provided a clear definition of a terrorist. A terrorist, under Act 82, meant any person who:

- By the use of any firearm, explosive or ammunition acts in a manner prejudicial to the public safety or to the maintenance of public order or incites to violence or counsels disobedience to the law or to any lawful order
- Carries or has in his possession or under his control any firearm, ammunition or explosive without lawful authority therefore
- Demands, collects or receives any supplies for the use of any person who intends or is about to act, or has recently acted, in a manner prejudicial to public safety or the maintenance of public order

The National Security Council, Malaysia's top policy-making body with regard to national security, defined terrorism as:

- Unlawful use of threat or the use of force or terror or any other attack by person, group or state regardless of objective or justification aim at other state, it citizens or their properties and its vital services with the intention of creating fear, intimidation and thus forcing government or organisation to follow their impressed will including those act in support directly or indirectly (refer to Directive No. 18, issued by the National Security Council)

== History ==
=== The birth of the Malaysian Communist Party ===
The South Seas Communist Party was established in 1922. The South Seas Communist Party gave way to the formation of Malayan Communist Party (MCP) in 1930. Throughout its formative years in Indonesia and Singapore, the party was actively involved in a failed revolution attempt in Indonesia and workers' union in Singapore. The failure of the 1925 uprising in Indonesia had caused a large influx of Indonesian communists into Singapore.

In the 1930s the MCP was operating illegally. Many party members and leaders were arrested when their identities were exposed with the capture of a Kuomintang courier. In 1939, the British had managed to install one of their agents, Lai Teck, as the Secretary General of the MCP.

=== Japanese invasion ===
The Japanese army invaded Malaya on 8 December 1941. The British administration in Singapore had then accepted the offer by the MCP to provide manpower. The British military administration trained the MCP volunteers and with the fall of Singapore to the Japanese, the British left Malaya, leaving behind a very nascent militia group. This nascent militia group was known as the Malayan People's Anti-Japanese Army (MPAJA). The MPAJA continued with their guerilla warfare against the Japanese forces until the Japanese surrendered in 1945.

There was a power vacuum in Malaya after the Japanese troop left. The MPAJA members went out from their jungle hideouts and begun their reprisal campaign against Japanese collaborators, the police regiment and civilians. Their reprisal campaign could have been the first known terrorism acts against the general population,

=== Formation of the British Military Administration and the establishment of the Malayan Union ===
The interim British Military Administration (BMA) was established on 12 September 1945, headed by Lord Louis Mountbatten. The BMA urged the MPAJA to surrender their weapons, which they reluctantly agreed. By 1948, the BMA was facing growing threat of strikes by the labour unions, which was infiltrated by communist agents. This culminated in the murder of 3 European planters at Sungai Siput, Perak on 12 June 1948. The death of the planters at Sungai Siput mark the beginning of the Malayan Emergency and the act was considered as an act of terror.

The Malayan Union was formally established on 1 April 1946 and Sir Edward Gent was appointed as its first Governor.

=== The Malayan Emergency (1948–1960) ===
The Malayan Union was replaced by the Federation of Malaya on 31 January 1948. The creation of the Federation with a capitalist economy and constitutional monarchy ran contrary to the vision of the MCP to establish an independent socialist republic in Malaya.

The proclamation of Emergency was announced on 16 June 1948. Following the proclamation of Emergency, hundreds of MCP party members were arrested and scores of MCP's senior leadership and members fled into the jungle. The remnants of MCP then established Malayan National Liberation Army (MNLA), with the aim of establishing a People's Democratic Republic of Malaya (including Singapore). During this period, the MNLA assassinated police, soldiers and civilians they perceived as supporting the colonial occupation.

==== Amnesty and Baling Talks ====
On 27 July 1955, the Federation of Malaya held its first general election, which was won by the Alliance coalition. Tunku Abdul Rahman became the Federation's first Chief Minister. Earlier in the same year, Tunku had proposed to grant amnesty to the MCP members and leadership, on condition that the MCP would lay down their arms, disband the MCP, submit to speedy investigation and allegiance to the Federation. The MCP on the other hand, would like to have their party to be recognised, communist members be given their right of return to the Federation and assurance that no communist party members will be interrogated and made to sign a declaration of loyalty to the Federation. The amnesty offer was announced on 8 September 1955.

Baling Talks was undertaken by the administration of Tunku Abdul Rahman on 28 December 1955. The talks collapsed without any deal sealed as the Federation delegation, led by Tunku himself and the MCP, led by its Secretary General, Ong Boon Hwa, better known as Chin Peng, refused to compromise. The amnesty offer was withdrawn on 8 February 1956.

=== Independence and the war against Communist ===
The Federation of Malaya achieved its independence on 31 August 1957. The independence removed the major cause of struggle for the communists. The communists continue to dwindle in strength and the Emergency was officially revoked on 31 July 1960. However, the MCP launched another major offensive against Malaysian government forces, beginning with an attack on border patrol troop at Kroh-Betong, northern Peninsula Malaysia on 17 June 1968. Skirmishes, bombings and assassinations continued until the signing of a tripartite peace treaty between Malaysian and Thai Governments as well as the MCP on 2 December 1989.

=== Post-independence and until present ===
==== War on terror and Islamic extremism ====
In July 2000, an Islamic militant group called Al-Ma'unah stole weapons from a Malaysian Army camp in an attempt to overthrow the Malaysian Government. The group was later cornered in the village of Sauk, Perak and was involved in a stand-off against the Malaysian Army and Royal Malaysian Police forces. Following a five-day standoff, the siege came to an end when Malaysian security forces, including the army 22nd Grup Gerak Khas (22nd GGK) and police VAT 69 Pasukan Gerakan Khas, stormed the camp in Operation Dawn.

On 6 April 2015, Malaysian authorities arrested seventeen suspected militants who were involved in an alleged terror plot in the capital Kuala Lumpur. Two of the suspects were alleged to have been fighting for the Islamic State of Iraq and the Levant (ISIS) in Syria. These arrests coincided with the Malaysian Government's plans to introduce two new anti-terror bills: the Prevention of Terrorism Act and the Special Measures Against Terrorism in Foreign Countries Act.

== Policy ==
=== Malaysia's Policy on terrorism ===
==== Official Policy ====
Malaysia's policy on terrorism is clearly stipulated in Directive No. 18 (Revised) issued by the National Security Council. Malaysia is putting the emphasis on:

- Denouncing any form of terrorist acts
- Protection of hostages' life and property
- Preference for negotiated solutions
- No exchange of hostage to resolve the crisis
- Strike action as a last resort following failure of negotiation

==== Total Defence (HANRUH) concept ====
Since 2006, the Malaysian Government has implemented the concept of total defence (HANRUH) as part of the national defence doctrine. The Malaysian Government defined the total defence concept as a form of overall and integrated defence involving government agencies, private sectors, non-governmental bodies and citizens of Malaysia to protect the sovereignty and integrity of Malaysia. Under this concept, the Malaysian Government has identified 5 total defence components:

- Psychological integrity
- Consolidation and unity of Malaysians
- Public preparedness
- Economic integrity
- Security preparedness

===== Psychological integrity =====
Under the component of psychological integrity, the vision is to prepare the Malaysian citizens to continuously ready and committed to protect the sovereignty and integrity of the country. The main objectives are to instil the following among the citizens:

- Sense of patriotism and nationalism
- Sense of love to the country
- Sense of pride to be Malaysians
- Sense of readiness to sacrifice for the country
- Sense of harmony, unity and national integration
- Well-informed citizens

=== Preparedness against terrorism ===
==== Consolidation and Unity of Malaysians ====
The vision of consolidation and unity of Malaysians is to create a harmonious and unified Malaysian race (Bangsa Malaysia) regardless of status, race, religion, culture and origin. The main objectives are to instil the following among the citizens:

- Caring
- Tolerance
- Collaboration
- Share similar vision and goal
- Respect religious diversity

==== Public preparedness ====
Public preparedness focuses on two main aspects, namely:

- Provision of sufficient access to protection of life and property
- Ensure security and continuous supply of basic amenities in the event of war, emergency and disaster

To ensure that the above focuses achieve its intended vision, the Malaysian Government has established the following as part of the implementation strategy:

- Rescue and emergency assistance services
- Fire safety brigade
- Food supply and distribution services
- Assign Malaysia Civil Defence Department as the lead agency to co-ordinate and implement all public preparedness programs in collaboration with public emergency response services and other volunteer associations

==== Economic integrity ====
The economic integrity component seeks to ensure solid economic prosperity and continuous competitiveness level. Three main factors identified under this component are:

- Stockpile of necessity items
- Staple food supply as a national strategic asset
- Ensuring transportation, energy and water supply continue to be provided without interruption and not under threat

The action plan for economic integrity is formulation of a national agriculture policy to reduce dependency on imported products and diversify national production.

==== Security preparedness ====
Security preparedness involve the policing and military forces of the country. The main task for the police force is to ensure public order, providing assistance to other government agencies, protecting lives and properties as well as assisting the cause of war. The military is responsible to protect national interest and sovereignty.

== Terror groups, members and attacks ==
=== Terrorist groups ===
A number of extreme groups that have been designated as terrorist groups in Malaysia are:

==== Local ====
Jihadist faction

- Al-Ma'unah (defeated and dissolved)
- Kumpulan Mujahidin Malaysia (defunct)
- Tanzim Qaedat al-Jihad (defunct)

Others faction

- Malayan Communist Party (peace deal)

==== Foreign ====
Jihadist faction

- Abu Sayyaf
- Al-Qaeda
- Darul Islam
- Islamic State of Iraq and Syria (ISIS)
- Jemaah Islamiyah

Pirate faction

- Indonesian pirates
- Moro pirates
- Somali pirates

Others faction

- Japanese Red Army (dissolved)
- Liberation Tigers of Tamil Eelam
- Sultanate of Sulu (Jamalul Kiram III faction) (defeated)
- Moro National Liberation Front (Nur Misuari faction)

=== Notable terrorist members ===
==== Malaysian ====
Three Malaysian terrorists: Mohamed Amin Mohamed Razali, Jamaludin Darus and Zahid Muslim who were a members of the Al-Ma'unah that was involved in the Sauk Siege have been executed by hanging in 2006. Azahari Husin and Noordin Mohammed Top (both have been killed by authorities in Indonesia) are responsible for the bombing incidents in Indonesia. Another Malaysian terrorist, Zulkifli Abdhir killed in the Philippines during an encounter between Philippine authorities and Moro Islamic Liberation Front (MILF) in an event known as the Mamasapano clash. Many other Malaysian terrorists were also killed in the Middle East, mainly served under the ISIS. Some of them that are known are: Zainuri Kamaruddin (killed), Ahmad Affendi Abdul Manaf (killed), Ahmad Salman Abdul Rahim (killed), Ahmad Tarmimi Maliki (killed), Fadzly Ariff Zainal Ariff (killed), Mohd Amirul Ahmad Rahim (killed), Mohd Lotfi Ariffin (killed), Mohd Najib Hussein (killed), Mohamad Syazwan Mohd Salim (killed) and Zid Saharani Mohamed Esa (killed).

==== Foreigners ====
While foreigners who have been either involved, arrested or labelled as terrorist in Malaysia over their terrorism act are: Agbimuddin Kiram (deceased), Ahmed Bilal (released), Amirbahar Hushin Kiram (detained), Jamalul Kiram III (deceased), Mas Selamat Kastari (detained) and Nur Misuari.

=== Notable terrorist attacks ===
==== Malaysian Airlines System Flight 653 hijacking ====
The aircraft crashed at Tanjung Kupang, Johor, on the evening of 4 December 1977, the result of an apparent hijacking by unknown assailants as soon as it reached cruise altitude. It was the first fatal accident for Malaysia Airlines (as Malaysian Airline System is now known), with all 93 passengers and 7 crew, from 13 countries, killed instantly. The Boeing 737 was en route from Penang International Airport to Singapore International Airport (Paya Lebar) via Sultan Abdul Aziz Shah Airport. The circumstances in which the hijacking and subsequent crash occurred remain unsolved.

==== AIA Building hostage crisis ====
On 5 August 1975, a group of Japanese Red Army (JRA) terrorists launched a coordinated operation against several foreign embassies, housed in AIA Building in Kuala Lumpur city centre. They took 50 hostages, including an American consul and a Swedish diplomat. The JRA terrorists sought the release of their comrades from the Japanese Government and they threatened to kill the hostages if the Japanese Government did not meet their demand. The crisis ended when five JRA prisoners were released from a Japanese prison. The terrorists then flew to Libya.

==== Sauk Siege ====
On 2 July 2000, Al-Mau'nah leader, Muhammad Amin bin Mohamed Razali launched a raid on a Malaysian Army Reserve camp in the early morning, stealing weapons such as M16 rifles, Steyr Aug rifles and others. After that, the group hid in a jungle near Bukit Jenalik, Sauk, Perak. On 5 July 2000, the group was besieged by Royal Malaysian Police and Malaysian Army. The security forces achieved victory in the battle. One militant died and 5 militants were wounded.

==== Sulu invasion on Sabah ====
The standoff started on 11 February 2013 when around 200 militants sent by Jamalul Kiram III, a self-proclaimed/claimant of a defunct-Sulu Sultanate arrived on Lahad Datu from Simunul island in the Philippines to stake his claim over a former dispute between Philippines and Malaysia. His followers were reported to have mutilated dead Malaysian security personnel bodies and tried to take Sabahan residents hostage. The invasion ended with the death of 56 of his followers together with 10 Malaysian security forces and six civilians, while the other followers were either captured and escaping back to the Philippines.

== See also ==
- Counter-terrorism in Malaysia
- 2000 al-Qaeda Summit
- Moro attacks on Sabah
- Separatist movements of Malaysia
- Separation of Singapore from Malaysia
