= 1957 in Malaya =

- Decades: 1930s; 1940s; 1950s; 1960s
- See also: Other events of 1957; History of Malaysia • Timeline • Years

This article lists important figures and events in Malayan public affairs during the year 1957, together with births and deaths of significant Malayans. Malaya became independent from British colonial rule on 31 August 1957.

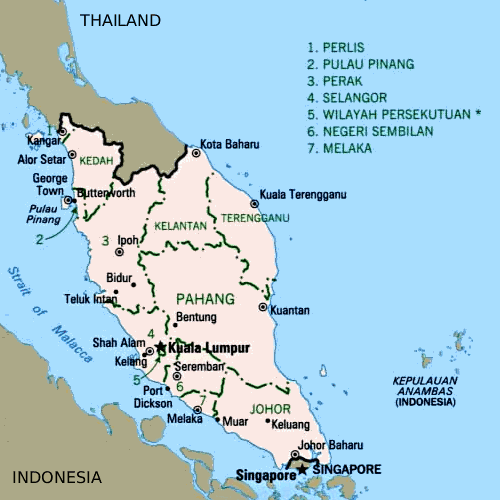
Map of Federation of Malaya

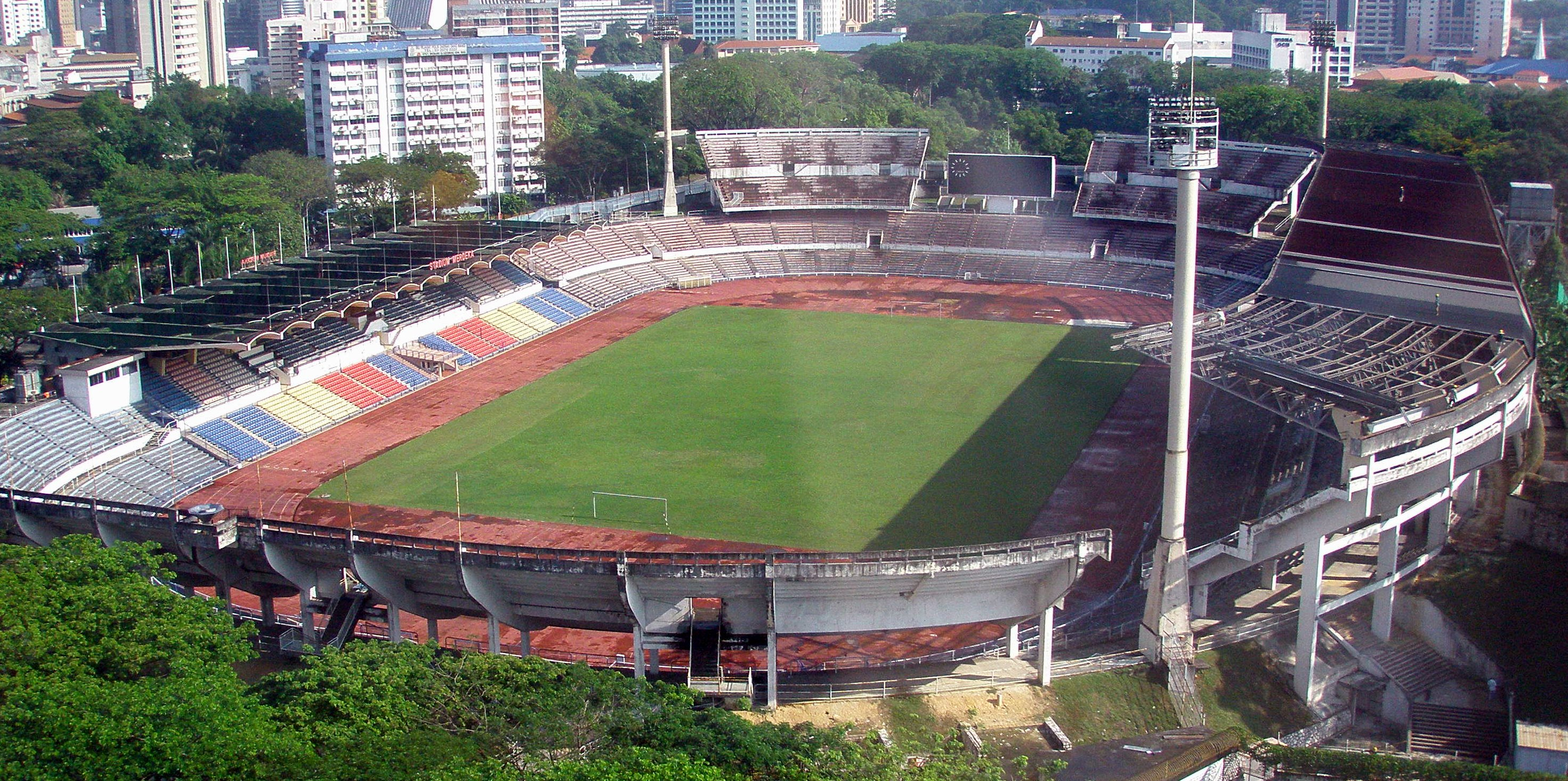
The Merdeka Stadium.

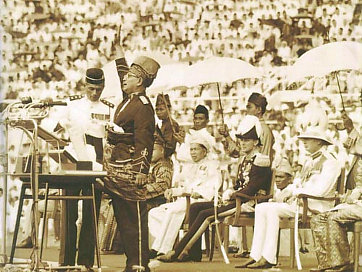
Tunku Abdul Rahman Putra Al-Haj announced the independence of Malaya from the British on August 31, 1957, at Stadium Merdeka.

The Flag of Malaya in use from 1950 to 1963

== Political figures (from 31 August 1957) ==
=== Federal level ===
- Yang di-Pertuan Agong: Tuanku Abdul Rahman of Negeri Sembilan
- Raja Permaisuri Agong: Tuanku Kurshiah of Negeri Sembilan
- Prime Minister: Tunku Abdul Rahman Putra Al-Haj
- Deputy Prime Minister: Datuk Abdul Razak Hussein

=== State level ===
- Sultan of Johor: Sultan Ibrahim
- Sultan of Kedah: Sultan Badlishah
- Sultan of Kelantan: Sultan Ibrahim
- Raja of Perlis: Tuanku Syed Putra
- Sultan of Perak: Sultan Yussuff Izzuddin Shah
- Sultan of Pahang: Sultan Abu Bakar Ri'ayatuddin Al-Muadzam Shah
- Sultan of Selangor: Sultan Hisamuddin Alam Shah (Deputy Yang di-Pertuan Agong)
- Sultan of Terengganu: Sultan Ismail Nasiruddin Shah
- Yang di-Pertuan Besar Negeri Sembilan: Tunku Munawir (Regent)
- Yang di-Pertua Negeri of Penang: Raja Tun Uda
- Yang di-Pertua Negeri of Malacca: Tun Leong Yew Koh

(Source: Malaysian Department of Informations)

== Events ==
- 15 August – The Federal Legislative Council passed the first Federation of Malayan constitution from the Reid Commission.
- 27 August – The Federation of Malayan constitution took effect for the first time.
- 30 August – Stadium Merdeka was officially opened.
- 31 August – Malaya achieved its independence from Britain, and joined the Commonwealth of Nations.
  - 12:00 am – In Selangor Club Padang, The Union Jack flag was lowered and replaced by the independent Federation of Malayan flag.
  - 7:30 am – The proclamation of independence was held in Stadium Merdeka, Kuala Lumpur
- 31 August–7 September – The Merdeka Tournament or Pestabola Merdeka was held for the first time after Malayan independence.
- 1 September – Tuanku Abdul Rahman of Negeri Sembilan was installed as the first Yang di-Pertuan Agong.
- 2 September – Malaya officially admitted as the 88th United Nations member.
- October – SMK Assunta was established.
- 3 October – The Agreement Between the Government of the United Kingdom of Great Britain and Northern Ireland and the Government of the Federation of Malaya on External Defense and Mutual Assistance was finalized.
- 30 October – The Alliance (the predecessor of the Barisan Nasional political coalition in Malaysia) was officially registered as a political organization.
- 1 December – The Malayan Public Records Office (now known as the Malaysian National Archives or Arkib Negara) was formed.
- 30 December – The first Malay Cultural Congress was held at Malacca.

== Births ==
- 17 March – Mohammad Nizar Jamaluddin – Politician and Menteri Besar Perak (2008–2009)
- 25 April – Jalil Hamid – Actor and comedian
- 4 July - M. Nasir - Singer, composer and actor
- 9 July – Salleh Said Keruak – Politician
- 14 August – Khalid bin Abdul Samad – Politician
- 14 September – Azahari Husin – Militant involved in 2002 Bali bombings (died 2005)
- 29 September – Mohd Abdul Wahid Endut – politician
- 20 October – Mohd Shafie Apdal – Politician
- 22 November – Wan Jamak Wan Hassan – Footballer

== Deaths ==
- 8 January – Tengku Muhamad bin al-Marhum Sultan Ahmad, 4th Menteri Besar of Pahang (b. 1901)
- 14 May – Deng Fuk Lung, Commander of the 2nd MPAJA Regiment (b. 1919)

== See also ==
- 1957
- Pre-Independence = 1956 in Malaysia | 1958 in Malaysia = Post-Independence
- History of Malaysia
