= Malaysia Youth Museum =

Museum in Melaka Tengah, Malacca, Malaysia

Coordinates: 2°11′29.8″N 102°14′58.3″E

- Muzium Belia Malaysia
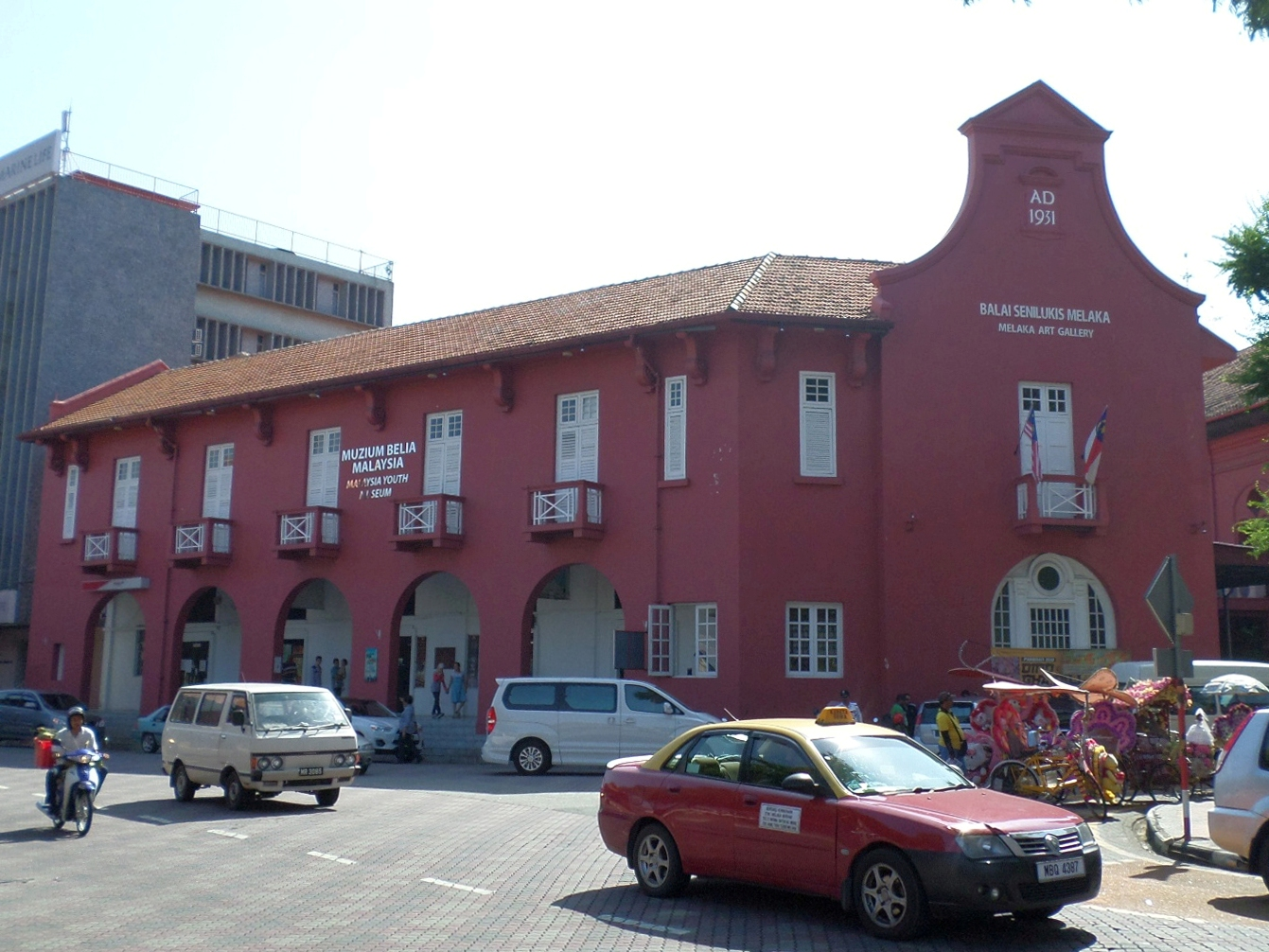
- Established: 15 April 1992
- Location: Malacca City, Malacca, Malaysia
- Type: museum

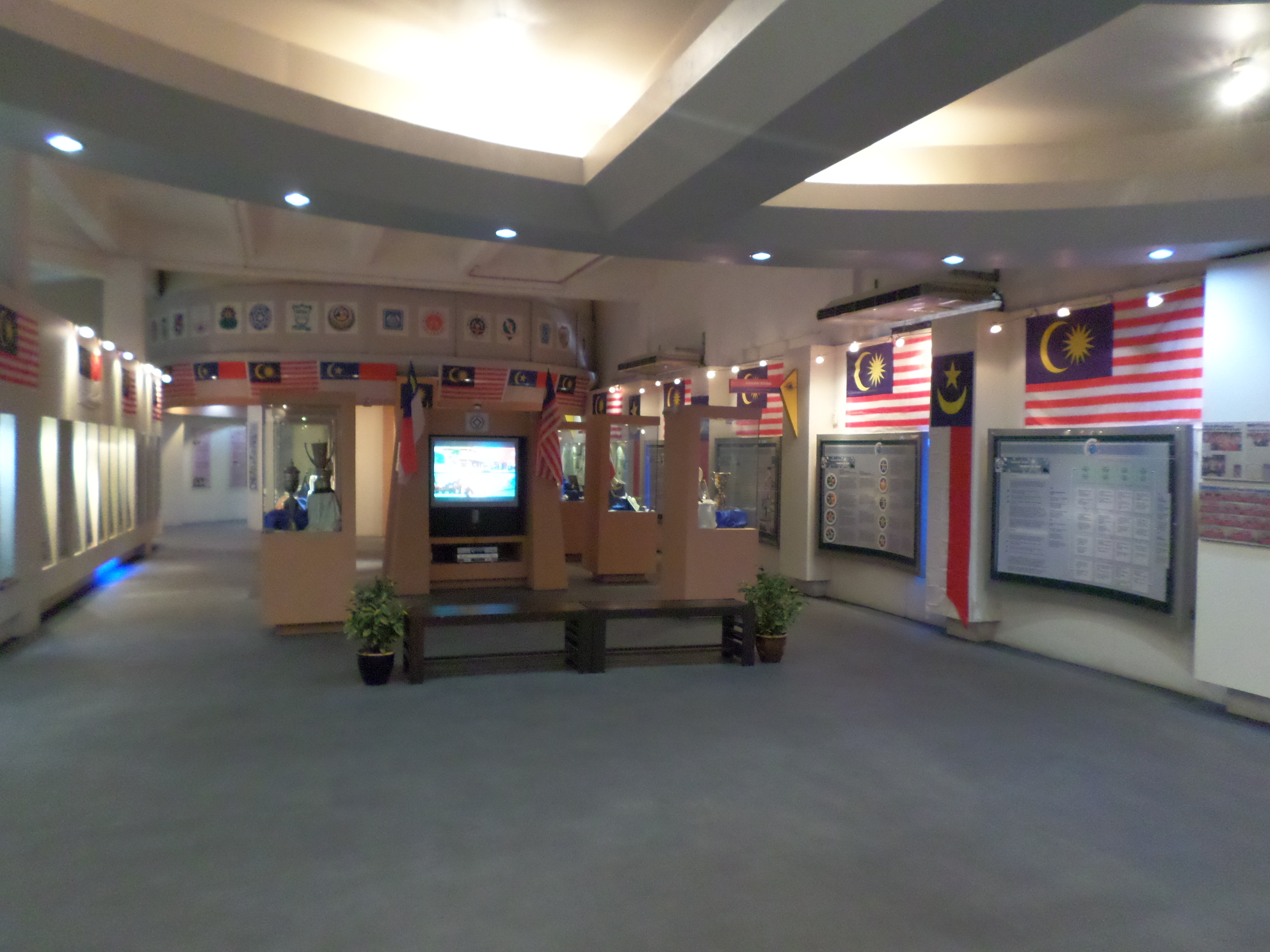
Malaysia Youth Museum exhibition hall

The Malaysia Youth Museum (Malay: Muzium Belia Malaysia) is a museum in Malacca City, Malacca, Malaysia, which dedicated to the youth of Malaysia and their contribution to the economic and social wellbeing at regional, national, and international levels.

The museum building was formerly used as part of the Dutch Administrative Complex during the Dutch Malacca. It was later converted into a post office and subsequently an Anglo-Chinese School in 1931 and finally the museum today, which was officially opened by then Prime Minister Mahathir Mohamad on 15 April 1992.

The museum is located on the ground floor of the building, which houses the Malacca Art Gallery at the upper floor. It is located in a cluster at Bandar Hilir, along with core Malacca historic sites: A Famosa, St Paul's Church, the Stadthuys, Christ Church, the Proclamation of Independence Memorial and the Malacca Sultanate Palace Museum. The museum opens every day except Monday from 9.00 a.m. to 5.30 p.m.

== See also ==
- List of museums in Malaysia
- List of tourist attractions in Malacca
