= Pipeline ambush =

Pipeline Ambush
- Part of Malayan Emergency
Date	22 June 1956
Location	Malaya
Result	Australian victory

Belligerents
Australia	Malayan Communist Party

Commanders and leaders
(Australia) Unknown	Unknown

Units involved
(Australia) Royal Australian Regiment: 2nd Battalion	unknown

Strength
Unknown	unknown

Casualties and losses
3 killed 3 wounded	2 killed

The Pipeline ambush took place during the Malayan Emergency. An Australian patrol of five troops were ambushed by communist forces. A firefight ensued where other Australian troops came to assist. Three Australians were killed making it the most costly Australian involvement of the Emergency.
