= Prevention of Terrorism Act 2015 =

Parliament of Malaysia
- Long title: An Act to provide for the prevention of the commission or support of terrorist acts involving listed terrorist organizations in a foreign country or any part of foreign country and for the control of the persons engaged in such acts and for related matters.
- Citation: Act 769
- Territorial extent: Malaysia
- Passed by: Dewan Rakyat
- Passed: 6 April 2015
- Passed by: Dewan Negara
- Passed: 23 April 2015
- Royal assent: 28 May 2015
- Commenced: 4 June 2015
- Effective: 1 September 2015, P.U. (B) 345/2015

Legislative history

Initiating chamber: Dewan Rakyat
- Bill title: Prevention of Terrorism Bill 2015
- Bill citation: D.R. 10/2015
- Introduced by: Wan Junaidi Tuanku Jaafar, Deputy Minister of Home Affairs
- First reading: 30 March 2015
- Second reading: 6 April 2015
- Third reading: 6 April 2015

Revising chamber: Dewan Negara
- Bill title: Prevention of Terrorism Bill 2015
- Bill citation: D.R. 10/2015
- Member(s) in charge: Wan Junaidi Tuanku Jaafar, Deputy Minister of Home Affairs
- First reading: 13 April 2015
- Second reading: 22 April 2015
- Third reading: 23 April 2015

Related legislation
- Prevention of Crime Act 1959 [Act 297]

Keywords
- Anti-terrorism
- Status: In force

The Prevention of Terrorism Act 2015 (Malay: Akta Pencegahan Keganasan 2015, abbreviated POTA), is an anti-terrorism law that was passed by the Malaysian government on 7 April 2015. It enables the Malaysian authorities to detain terror suspects without trial for a period of two years. POTA also does not allow any judicial reviews of detentions. Instead, detentions will be reviewed by a special Prevention of Terrorism Board. The POTA bill has been criticised by opposition elements as a reincarnation of the former Internal Security Act, which was revoked in 2012. The passage of POTA coincided with the arrest of seventeen suspected militants who were involved in an alleged terror plot in the capital Kuala Lumpur.

== Structure ==
The Prevention of Terrorism Act 2015, in its current form (as of 4 June 2015), consists of 5 Parts containing 35 sections and 1 schedule (including no amendment).

- Part I: Preliminary
- Part II: Powers of Arrest and Remand
- Part III: Inquiries
- Part IV: Detention and Restriction Orders
- Part V: General
- Schedule
