= Control of Supplies Act 1961 =

Parliament of Malaysia
- Long title: An Act to provide for the control and rationing of supplies.
- Citation: Act 122
- Territorial extent: Throughout Malaysia
- Enacted by: Dewan Rakyat
- Enacted: 1961 (Act No. 14 of 1961); Revised: 1973 (Act 122 w.e.f. 17 September 1973)
- Passed by: Dewan Negara
- Passed: 13 February 1961
- Effective: [Peninsular Malaysia—1 July 1963, L.N. 150/1963; Sabah and Sarawak—5 March 1964, L.N. 80/1964]

Legislative history

First chamber: Dewan Rakyat
- Bill title: Control of Supplies Bill 1961
- Introduced by: , Minister of

Second chamber: Dewan Negara
- Bill title: Control of Supplies Bill 1961
- Member(s) in charge: Cheah Theam Swee, Assistant Minister of Commerce and Industry
- First reading: 13 February 1961
- Second reading: 13 February 1961
- Third reading: 13 February 1961

Amended by
- Modification of Laws (Price Control and Control of Supplies) (Extension) Order 1964 [L.N. 80/1964] Modification of Laws (Price Control and Control of Supplies) (Extension) (No. 2) Order 1964 [L.N. 106/1964] Control of Supplies (Amendment) Act 1973 [Act A196] Control of Supplies (Amendment) Act 1975 [Act A287] Malaysian Currency (Ringgit) Act 1975 [Act 160] Control of Supplies (Amendment) Act 1990 [Act 771] Control of Supplies (Amendment) Act 2006 [Act A1270]

Related legislation
- Food Control Ordinance 1939 [S.S. Ord. No. 16 of 1939] Food Control Enactment 1939 [F.M.S. En. No. 21 of 1939] Food Control Enactment 1939 [Johore En. No. 15 of 1939] Food Control Enactment [Kedah En. No. 15 of 1358] Food Control Enactment 1939 [Kelantan En. No. 25 of 1939] Food Control Enactment 1358 [Perlis En. No. 5 of 1358] Food Control Enactment 1358 [Terengganu En. No. 10 of 1358] Food Control Proclamation [B.M.A. Proclamation No. 10]
- Status: In force

The Control of Supplies Act 1961 (Malay: Akta Kawalan Bekalan 1961), is a Malaysian laws which enacted to provide for the control and rationing of supplies.

== Structure ==
The Control of Supplies Act 1961, in its current form (1 December 2011), consists of 4 Parts containing 30 sections and 1 schedule (including 7 amendments).

- Part I: Preliminary
- Part II: Powers of Controller
- Part III: Offences and Penalties
- Part IV: Miscellaneous and Repeal
- Schedule
