= Universiti Islam Malaysia =

Islamic private university in Malaysia

Universiti Islam Malaysia, Petaling Jaya (UIM)
- Type: Private
- Location: Petaling Jaya, Selangor, Malaysia
- Campus: Petaling Jaya
- Colours: Blue Royal, Yellow
- Website: www.uim.edu.my

Universiti Islam Malaysia (UIM; Islamic University of Malaysia) is a postgraduate-only university in Malaysia. The administration and academic offices are located in Petaling Jaya with its permanent campus currently under development.

UIM offers a wide range of undergraduate and graduate programs in various disciplines, including Islamic studies, Shariah law, education, economics, management, communication, science, and engineering.

The university has six faculties, namely the Faculty of Quranic and Sunnah Studies, Faculty of Islamic Civilization, Faculty of Syariah and Law, Faculty of Economics and Muamalat, Faculty of Science and Technology, and Faculty of Education and Social Sciences.
