= Prevention of Crime Act 1959 =

1959 Malaysian law

Federal Legislative Council of the Federation of Malaya
- Long title: An Act to provide for the more effectual prevention of crime throughout Malaysia and for the control of criminals, members of secret societies, terrorists and other undesirable persons, and for matters incidental thereto.
- Citation: Act 297 (First enacted as F.M. Ordinance No. 13 of 1959, revised as Act 297 on 19 January 1984)
- Territorial extent: Throughout Malaysia
- Passed: 19 February 1959
- Effective: 1 April 1959, L.N. 85/1959

Amended by
- Prevention of Crime (Amendment) Act 1960 [Act 26/1960] Prevention of Crime (Amendment) Act 1966 [Act 6/1966] Societies Act 1966 [Act 13/1966] Interpretation Act 1967 [Act 23/1967] Registration of Criminals and Undesirable Persons Act 1969 [Act 7] Malaysian Currency (Ringgit) Act 1975 [Act 160] Criminal Procedure Code (Amendment and Extension) Act 1976 [Act A324] Restricted Residence (Repeal) Act 2011 [Act 734] Prevention of Crime (Amendment and Extension) Act 2014 [Act A1459] Prevention of Crime (Amendment of First and Second Schedule) Order 2014 [P.U. (A) 122/2014] Prevention of Crime (Amendment) Act 2015 [Act A1484] Prevention of Crime (Amendment of First Schedule) Order 2015 [P.U. (A) 201/2015] Prevention of Crime (Amendment) Act 2017 [Act A1549] Prevention of Crime (Amendment of Second Schedule) Order 2017 [P.U. (A) 383/2017] Prevention of Crime (Amendment of Third Schedule) Order 2017 [P.U. (A) 384/2017]

Keywords
- Crime prevention
- Status: In force

The Prevention of Crime Act 1959 (Malay: Akta Pencegahan Jenayah 1959) is a Malaysian law which establishes the procedure for arrest and detention of individuals suspected of belonging to a criminal organization, including groups involved in drug trafficking, human trafficking and terrorism. It grants the police power to arrest and detain an individual without trial for up to 60 days.

== History ==
When it was proposed back in January 1959, the Malayan government claimed that the main purpose of this legislation is to offer "greater protection to the public from gangsters". The Ministry of Interior and Justice in a statement released on 22 January 1959 cited that rising activities of secret society members, gangsters and extortionists have raised significant public concern, while the existing and ordinary criminal procedures are "inadequate" in dealing with such organized criminals, therefore the need for this legislation. A police spokesperson also revealed that there are around 15,000 gang members present in the country, with 12,000 of them being active members. The bill was tabled to the Federal Legislative Council of Malaya on 18 February 1959, and was unanimously passed on the next day. The law officially came into force on 1 April of the same year.

== Structure ==
The Prevention of Crime Act 1959, in its current form (1 December 2015), consists of 5 Parts containing 23 sections and 3 schedules (including 12 amendments).

- Part I: Powers of Arrest and Remand
- Part II: Inquiries
- Part III: Registration
- Part IV: Consequences of Registration
- Part IVA: Detention Orders
- Part V: General
- Schedules
