= Mr. Os =

Malaysian comedian and actor (1961–2016)

- Born: Mohd Yusof Abdul Hamid; Kuala Kangsar, Perak, Malaysia
- Died: April 8, 2016 (aged 55); Batu Caves, Selangor, Malaysia
- Resting place: Bukit Permata Muslim cemetery, Selangor, Malaysia
- Occupation: Comedian
- Years active: 1986–2016
- Spouse: 2
- Children: 7

Mohd Yusof Abdul Hamid, known by his stage name Mr. Os, was a Malaysian comedian.

== Selected filmography ==
- Balik Kampung (1986)
- Mr. Os (film) (1987)
- Keluarga 99 (1987)
- Jodoh Boleh Diatur (1988)
- Kembar Siam (1989)
- Orang Kampung Otak Kimia (1990)
- Adik (film) (1991)
- Boss (1991)
- Cikgu Romantik (1993)
- Ghazal Untuk Rabiah (1997)
- Senario The Movie: Ops Pocot (2011)

=== Television ===
He took a break from acting to work as a taxi driver before returning to television.

| Year | Title | Channel | Notes |
|---|---|---|---|
| 2009 | Apa Ke Halnya? | TV9 | |

== Personal life and death ==
In March 2015, Mr. Os had a tonsil surgery, which subsequently prompted rumors of his death. He had stage 4 cancer tonsil cancer. He passed away on 8 April 2016 due to tonsil cancer at Selayang Hospital in Selangor, Malaysia at 2:50 p.m. The funeral prayer was held at the Surau Al-Muhajirin in Selangor, Malaysia. His body was laid in the Bukit Permata Muslim cemetery in Selangor, Malaysia.

== Accolades ==
| Year | Award | Category | Work | Result | Notes | Ref. |
|---|---|---|---|---|---|---|
| 1987 | 6th Malaysia Film Festival | Best Comedy Actor | Mr. Os (film) | Won | | |
| 1990 | 9th Malaysia Film Festival | Best Supporting Actor | Adik (film) | Won | For his role of an autistic young man. | |
| 1997 | 16th Malaysia Film Festival | Best Comedy Actor | Ghazal Untuk Rabiah | Won | | |
| 2011 | Maharaja Lawak Mega | —N/a | —N/a | Won | He won the title of this reality show alongside Abon (comedian) (Sharizan Ahmad). Together they formed the comedy duo, Osbon, and won RM 350,000. | |
