= Elections Act 1958 =

Malaysian election law

- Long title: An Act providing for the elections to the Dewan Rakyat and to the Legislative Assemblies of the States.
- Citation: Act 19
- Territorial extent: Throughout Malaysia
- Enacted: 1958 (Ordinance No. 33 of 1958); Revised: 1970 (Act 19 w.e.f. 11 January 1971)
- Effective: Peninsular Malaysia, Federal Territory of Putrajaya (Note: Note—See section 6 of Act A1095.)—28 August 1958, L.N. 250/1958; Sabah, (Note: Note—For extension and modification of Act to Sabah, see P.U. 56/1966, P.U. 144/1966, P.U. 498/1966, P.U. 348/1967.) Federal Territory of Labuan (Note: Note—See section 6 of Act A585.)—1 August 1965, P.U. 176/1966; Sarawak (Note: Note—For extension and modification of Act to Sarawak, see P.U. 497/1966, P.U. 349/1967, P.U. 55/1968.)—1 November 1966, P.U. 227/1967

Amended by
- Constitution (Amendment) Act 1962 [Act 14/1962] Election Act 1963 [Act 13/1963] Elections (Amendment) Act 1965 [Act 7/1965] Modification of Laws (Election Offences and Elections) (Extension to Sabah) Order 1966 [P.U. 56/1966] Modification of Laws (Election Offences and Elections) (Extension to Sabah) Order 1966 [P.U. 144/1966] Modification of Laws (Election Offences and Elections) (Extension to Sarawak) Order 1966 [P.U. 497/1966] Modification of Laws (Election Offences and Elections) (Extension to Sabah) (Amendment) Order 1966 [P.U. 498/1966] Modification of Laws (Election Offences and Elections) (Extension to Sabah) (Amendment) Order 1967 [P.U. 348/1967] Modification of Laws (Election Offences and Elections) (Extension to Sarawak) (Amendment) Order 1967 [P.U. 349/1967] Modification of Laws (Election Offences and Elections) (Extension to Sarawak) (Amendment) Order 1968 [P.U. 55/1968] Elections (Amendment) Act 1972 [Act A95] Malaysian Currency (Ringgit) Act 1975 [Act 160] Notification under Titles of Office Ordinance 1949 [P.U. (B) 57/1982] Elections (Amendment) Act 1986 [Act A639] Elections (Amendment) Act 1990 [Act A768] Elections (Amendment) Act 1994 [Act A889] Elections (Amendment) Act 2002 [Act A1155] Elections (Amendment) Act 2003 [Act A1205] Elections (Amendment) Act 2007 [Act A1317]

Keywords
- Election, election officer, constituency, voter registration, election writ, polling place
- Status: In force

The Elections Act 1958 (Malay: Akta Pilihan Raya 1958) is a Malaysian law which enacted to provide for the elections to the Dewan Rakyat and Dewan Undangan Negeri.

== Structure ==
The Elections Act 1958, in its current form (1 December 2011), consists of 6 Parts containing 17 sections and no schedule (including 19 amendments).

- Part I: Preliminary
  - Section 1: Short title
  - Section 2: Interpretation
- Part II: Supervision of Elections
  - Section 3: Appointments of officers
  - Section 3A: General powers and duties of Secretary, Deputy Secretary and Assistant Secretaries
  - Section 4: Powers of officers
  - Section 5: General powers and duties of Election Commission
- Part III: Constituencies
  - Section 6: (Deleted)
  - Section 7: Polling districts and polling centres
- Part IV: Registration of Electors
  - Section 8: Appointment of officers
  - Section 9: Preparation, publication and revision of electoral rolls
  - Section 9A: Certified or re-certified electoral roll shall be deemed to be final
  - Section 10: Registration in one constituency only
  - Section 11: (Deleted)
- Part V: Conduct of Elections
  - Section 12: Writs of election
  - Section 13: Election of candidates
  - Section 14: Use of schools and public buildings and premises as polling centres
- Part VI: Regulations
  - Section 15: Power to make regulations relating to the registration of electors
  - Section 16: Power to make regulations relating to the conduct of elections
  - Section 17: Regulations to be laid before the Dewan Rakyat
