= Corrosive and Explosive Substances and Offensive Weapons Act 1958 =

Malaysian law

Federal Legislative Council
- Long title: An Act to provide certain penalties relating to the unlawful possession of corrosive and explosive substances and the carrying of offensive weapons.
- Citation: Act 357
- Territorial extent: Throughout Malaysia
- Enacted by: Federal Legislative Council
- Enacted: 1958 (Ord. No. 43 of 1958); Revised: 1988 (Act 357 w.e.f. 1 December 1988)
- Effective: [Peninsular Malaysia—1 January 1959, L.N. 384/1958; Sabah and Sarawak—16 September 1963, L.N. 232/1963]

Amended by
- Corrosive and Explosive Substances and Offensive Weapons (Amendment) Act 1961 [Act 16/1961] Modification of Laws (Internal Security and Public Order) (Borneo States) Order 1963 [L.N. 232/1963] Criminal Procedure Code (Amendment and Extension) Act 1976 [Act A324] Penal Code (Amendment and Extension) Act 1976 [Act A327] Offensive Weapon Order 1978 [P.U. (A) 294/1978] Corrosive and Explosive Substances and Offensive Weapons (Amendment of Second Schedule) Order 1984 [P.U. (A) 252/1984] Corrosive and Explosive Substances and Offensive Weapons (Amendment of Second Schedule) Order 1989 [P.U. (B) 131/1989] Corrosive and Explosive Substances and Offensive Weapons (Amendment) Order 1992 [P.U. (A) 23/1992] Corrosive and Explosive Substances and Offensive Weapons (Amendment) Act 2014 [Act A1463] Corrosive and Explosive Substances and Offensive Weapons (Amendment of Second Schedule) 2024 [P.U. (A) 248/2024]
- Status: In force

Corrosive and Explosive Substances and Offensive Weapons Act 1958 (Malay: Akta Bahan-Bahan Kakisan dan Letupan dan Senjata Berbahaya 1958) is a Malaysian law enacted to provide certain penalties relating to the unlawful possession of corrosive and explosive substances and the carrying of offensive weapons.

== Structure ==
The Corrosive and Explosive Substances and Offensive Weapons Act 1958, in its current form (1 October 2014), consists of 12 sections and 2 schedules (including 9 amendments), without separate Part.

- Section 1: Short title and application
- Section 2: Interpretation
- Section 3: Possession of corrosive or explosive substance for the purpose of causing hurt
- Section 4: Using a corrosive or explosive substance or offensive weapon
- Section 5: Consorting with person carrying corrosive or explosive substance
- Section 6: Carrying offensive weapons in public places
- Section 7: Offences relating to scheduled weapons
- Section 8: Consorting with persons carrying offensive weapons in public places
- Section 9: Power of search and seizure
- Section 10: Disposal of property
- Section 11: Presumptions
- Section 12: Power to amend Schedule
- Schedules

== Statutory Provisions ==
=== Section 6: Carrying offensive weapons in public weapons ===
Under this Act, the carrying or possession of offensive weapon in public places without lawful authority or lawful purpose is criminalised under section 6(1) of the Act. Anyone found guilty under this section is punishable with a minimum of 5 years to a maximum of 10 years of imprisonment and may also be subjected to whipping.

This offence is a non-bailable offence and no bail can be granted by the court for anyone charged under section 6(1). During the court trial, the burden of proving the existence of lawful purpose will be lied upon the accused, not the prosecutor.

==== Exception ====
However, under section 6(2), the carrying of an offensive weapon by members of security forces such as police or military in the performance of their duty, or by anyone in his ceremonial dress during a ceremony is considered as "carried with lawful athority" instead and will not be prosecuted.

=== Section 7: Offences relating to scheduled weapons ===
Under section 7(1), it is an offence to carry or possess (either in public or private), manufacture, sell, hire, or offer for sale or hire, or lend or give to another person any scheduled weapon without lawful purpose. Anyone found guilty under this section is punishable with a minimum of 5 years to a maximum of 10 years of imprisonment.

Similar to section 6(1), this offence is a non-bailable offence and the burden of proving the existence of lawful purpose is lied upon the accused.

=== First Schedule ===
The following is a list of chemicals gazetted as a "corrosive substance" under the First Schedule of this Act as of 26 September 2024. The definition of "corrosive substance" under this Act is not limited to the following listed items, and may include any other substances that can cause hurt on human body by corrosive action.

1. Sulphuric acid
2. Nitric acid
3. Hydrochloric acid
4. Formic acid
5. Acetic acid
6. Phenols
7. Ammonia
8. Potassium hydroxide
9. Sodium hydroxide

=== Second Schedule ===
The following is a list of offensive weapons gazetted as a "scheduled weapon" under the Second Schedule of this Act as of 26 September 2024.

1. Any knife, sometimes known as a "flick knife", which has a blade which opens automatically by hand pressure applied to a button, spring or other device in or attached to the handle of the knife.
2. Any knife, sometimes known as a "gravity knife", which has a blade which is released from the handle or sheath thereof by the force of gravity or the application of centrifugal force and which, when released, is locked in place by means of a button, spring, lever or other device.
3. Any whip manufactured from bicycle or motor cycle chains, or from any similar kind of chainwork.
4. All kinds of knuckleduster.
5. Any blade or other instrument attached to or forming part of a bicycle pump, metal-pipe or stick, and concealed therein, which is capable of being used for cutting or stabbing.
6. Any knife-like instrument with three sharp edges and a sharp pointed tip, sometimes known as a "bearing-scraper".
7. Any small axe normally used as a weapon and commonly known as "kapak kecil".
8. Any sword, kris, parang or other knife which on any part of it is written, embossed, inscribed with or which otherwise bears any verse, word or character connected with or relating to any religion or belief.
9. Any sword or parang which is normally meant to be used as a weapon and not as an agricultural implement or household or garden tool.
10. Any spear or spearhead.
11. Any cross bow.
12. Any Patrolite, Stun Gun, Taser, Control Club or any such similar instrument, device or equipment operated by battery or electricity or any form of power.
13. Any T-baton made from any material which is used as a weapon.

== See also ==
- Knife legislation
- Offensive weapon
