= Bible College of Malaysia =

Coordinates: 3°06′19.5″N 101°39′13.1″E

Bible College of Malaysia (BCM) is a denominational seminary affiliated with the Assemblies of God of Malaysia. It is located in the city of Petaling Jaya, Selangor, Malaysia. Established in 1960, BCM is accredited by the Asia Theological Association (ATA) and is a charter member of the Asia Pacific Theological Association (APTA).

== History ==
BCM was started as the Bible Institute of Malaya in 1960 by the Assemblies of God of Malaysia as a training centre for national workers. The institute initially offered a three-year diploma course conducted in the English language. A Chinese language department was formally established in 1980 and in 2003, a Malay language department was established.

In 1982, the name was changed to the Bible College of Malaysia with the introduction of the Bachelor of Theology programme. A Certificate of Biblical Studies for lay leaders was started in 1986. Full accreditation by the Asia Theological Association (ATA) was gained in 1989 and in 1990, BCM became the first chartered member of the Asia Pacific Theological Association (APTA). BCM was also a founding member of the Malaysia Association of Theological Schools (MATS).

== Organisation ==
BCM is wholly owned by the General Council of the Assemblies of God of Malaysia. It is governed by a Board of Directors: two representing the Executive Committee of the Assemblies of God, the President of the college, one other BCM representative, one field representative elected by the General Council-in-session, the Chinese Language Division Supervisor, and the Alumni President.

== Academic programmes ==
BCM offers both full-time and part-time academic programmes leading to the awarding of the following qualifications:

=== Certificates and diplomas ===
- Certificate of Biblical Studies (CBS)
- Certificate of Christian Ministry (CCM)
  - Social Ministry (in cooperation with Malaysian CARE and Malaysia Theological Seminary)
- Certificate of Theology (CTh)
- Diploma of Christian Studies (DipCS)
- Diploma of Theology (DipTh)

=== Undergraduate ===
- Bachelor of Theology (BTh)

=== Postgraduate ===
- Master of Ministry (MMin)

== Accreditation ==
The following qualifications offered by BCM are accredited:

- Diploma of Theology

Both the English language and Chinese language programs are accredited by the ATA.

- Bachelor of Theology

The English language programme is accredited by the ATA.
