= Malacca Art Gallery =

Art gallery in Melaka Tengah, Malacca, Malaysia

- Balai Seni Lukis Melaka
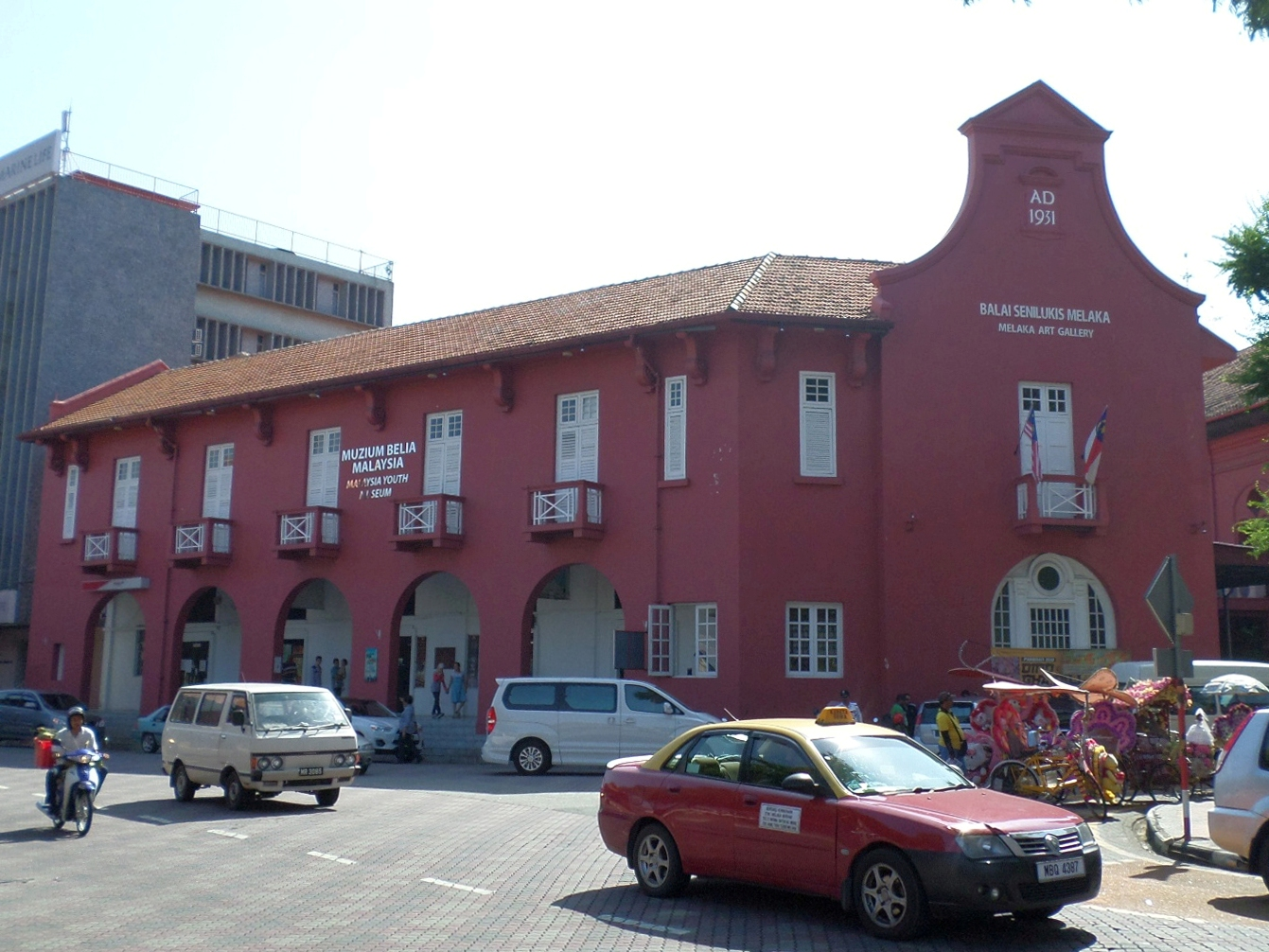
- Established: 1958; 68 years ago
- Location: Malacca City, Malacca, Malaysia
- Coordinates: 2°11′29.8″N 102°14′58.3″E
- Type: art gallery

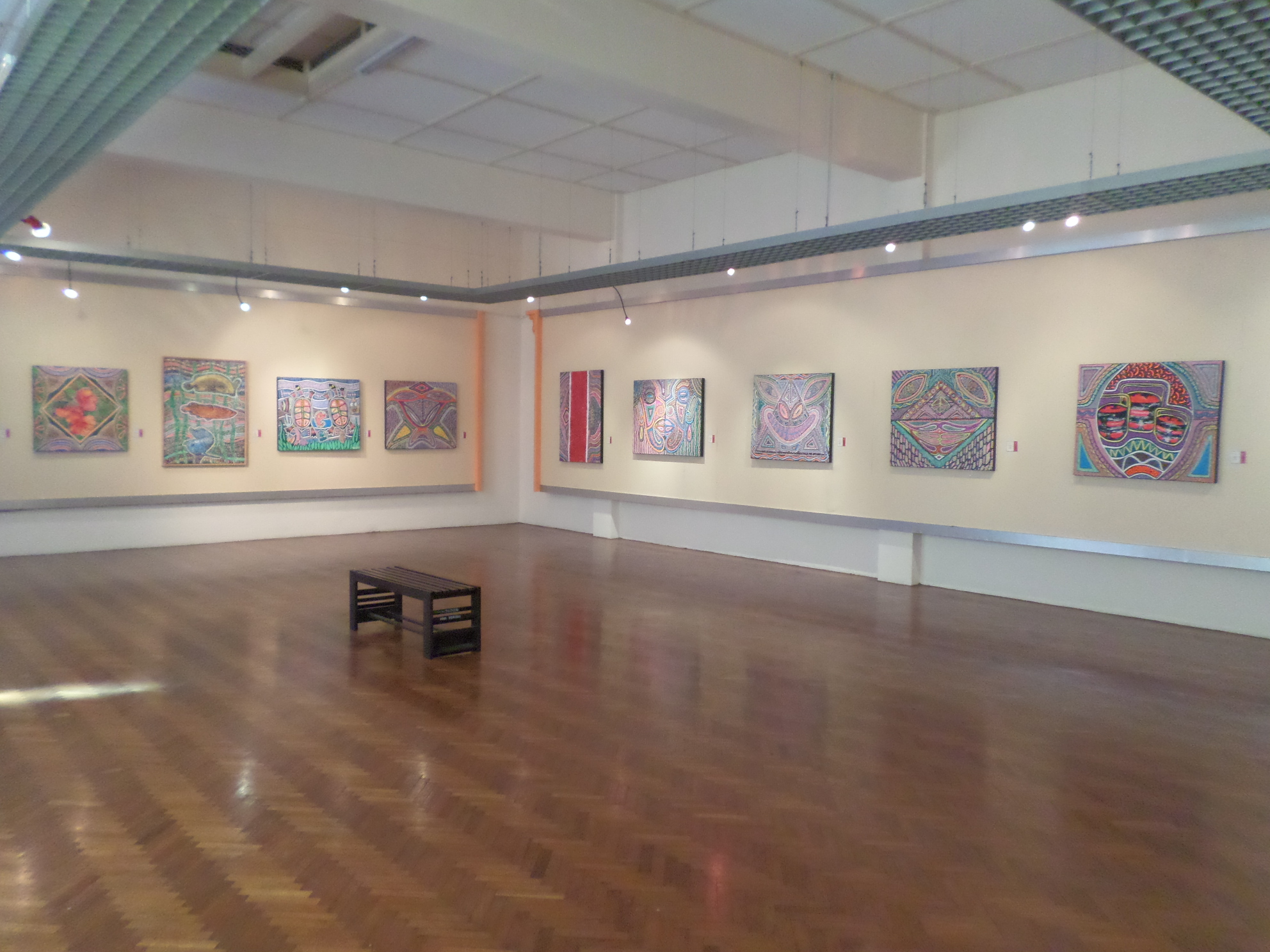
Malacca Art Gallery exhibition hall

Malacca Art Gallery (Malay: Balai Seni Lukis Melaka) is an art gallery in Malacca City, Malacca, Malaysia which was established in 1958. It is located on the upper floor of the building, which houses the Malaysia Youth Museum at the ground floor and was originally established as the administrative office of Dutch Malacca government.

The permanent section of the gallery exhibits around 150 paintings and 30 sculptures produced by various Malaysian artists. Foreign artists displayed including Gerard Van Den Oetelaar from the Netherlands. The gallery also regularly exhibits other exhibitions such as calligraphy, movie etc.

== See also ==
- List of tourist attractions in Malacca
- Penang State Museum and Art Gallery
