= Tengku Ampuan Tua Intan Zaharah =

Raja Permaisuri Agong from 1965 to 1970

Intan Zaharah اينتن زهرة

Queen consort of Malaysia
- Tenure: 21 September 1965 – 20 September 1970
- Predecessor: Tengku Budriah
- Successor: Tuanku Bahiyah

Tengku Ampuan Besar of Terengganu
- Tenure: 6 June 1949 – 20 September 1979
- Successor: Tengku Ampuan Bariah

Tengku Ampuan of Terengganu
- Tenure: 20 September 1979 – 14 May 1998
- Successor: Tengku Ampuan Bariah

Tengku Ampuan Tua of Terengganu
- Tenure: 14 May 1998 – 24 January 2015
- Born: 13 April 1928; Singapore, Straits Settlements
- Died: 24 January 2015 (aged 86); Pantai Hospital, Kuala Lumpur, Malaysia
- Burial: 25 January 2015; Abidin Mosque, Kuala Terengganu, Terengganu, Malaysia
- Spouse: Ismail Nasiruddin of Terengganu (m. 1944; died 1979)
Names
- Tengku Intan Zaharah binti Tengku Hitam Omar
Regnal name
- Tengku Ampuan Besar Tengku Intan Zaharah binti Almarhum Tengku Seri Setia Raja Tengku Hitam Omar
- Father: Tengku Seri Setia Raja Tengku Hitam Omar bin Al-Marhum Tengku Muda Osman
- Mother: Raja Zainab binti Al-Marhum Raja Alang
- Religion: Sunni Islam

Tengku Ampuan Tua Tengku Intan Zaharah binti Almarhum Tengku Seri Setia Raja Tengku Hitam Omar (Jawi: تڠكو امڤوان توا تڠكو اينتن زهرة بنت المرحوم تڠكو سري ستيا راج تڠكو هيتم عمر; 13 April 1928 – 24 January 2015) was the Tengku Ampuan Tua (Grand Queen Dowager) of Terengganu from 1998 until her death in 2015. She was formerly the Tengku Ampuan Besar (Queen consort) of Terengganu from 1945 to 1979, the Tengku Ampuan (Queen dowager) of Terengganu from 1979 to 1998. She also served as the 4th Raja Permaisuri Agong (Queen of Malaysia) from 1965 to 1970.

== Early life ==
Tengku Intan was born in Singapore on 13 April 1928. Her father, Tengku Seri Setia Raja Terengganu Tengku Hitam Omar, was a member of the Singapore (Johor Bendahara Horeh) royal family, serving in the Terengganu State Civil Service as the State Secretary of Terengganu; he was exiled since the death of the last Sultan of Singapore, Alauddin Alam Shah, in 1897. Her mother was Raja Zainab binti Raja Alang (second wife of her father).

Tengku Intan received her education at the Malay School in Telok Kurau and Katong Convent, Singapore.

== Royal life ==
Tengku Intan married Sultan Ismail Nasiruddin Shah ibni Almarhum Sultan Zainal Abidin III (then Tengku Paduka Raja of Terengganu) on 3 April 1944 as his second wife. She had no children with him.

On 5 November 1945 the Terengganu State Council of thirteen members announced the dismissal of Sultan Ali Shah and the appointment of Tengku Ismail as the fifteenth Sultan of Terengganu. Tengku Ismail became known as Sultan Ismail Nasiruddin Shah and was installed on 6 June 1949 at Istana Maziah, Kuala Terengganu.

Accordingly, Tengku Intan Zaharah became Tengku Ampuan Besar (Queen) of Terengganu. Tengku Intan served as Raja Permaisuri Agong during her husband's reign as the fourth Yang di-Pertuan Agong or King of Malaysia.

In 1979, upon her husband's death she was created Tengku Ampuan (Queen Dowager) of Terengganu. In 1998, on the death of her stepson, Sultan Mahmud Al-Muktafi Billah Shah, she became Tengku Ampuan Tua (Grand Queen Dowager) of Terengganu.

== Death ==
Tengku Ampuan Tua Tengku Intan Zaharah died on 24 January 2015 at 3:30 pm in Hospital Pantai, Kuala Lumpur due to pneumonia. She was 86 years old. Her body was brought back to Terengganu and was laid to rest beside her husband's grave, Sultan Ismail Nasiruddin Shah at the Royal Mausoleum near Abidin Mosque, Kuala Terengganu.

== Awards and recognitions ==
=== National honours ===
==== Honours of Terengganu ====
- Member 1st Class of the Most Distinguished Family Order of Terengganu (DK)
- Member Grand Companion of the Most Revered Order of Sultan Mahmud I of Terengganu (SSMT)
- Knight Grand Commander of the Most Distinguished Order of the Crown of Terengganu (SMPT)

==== Honours of Malaysia ====
- Recipient of the Most Exalted Order of the Crown of the Realm (DMN, 6 April 1966)

=== Foreign honours ===
- Ethiopia
  - Dame Grand Cordon of the Order of the Queen of Sheba (21 May 1968)
- Germany
  - Grand Cross Special Class of the Order of Merit of the Federal Republic of Germany (9 March 1967)
- Indonesia
  - First Class of the Order of Mahaputera (16 March 1970)
- Iran
  - Member 1st Class of the Order of the Pleiades (17 January 1968)
- Japan
  - Dame Grand Cross (Paulownia) of the Order of the Precious Crown (19 February 1970)
- Philippines
  - Grand Collar of the Golden Heart Medal (GCGH, 9 January 1968)
- South Korea
  - Dame of the Grand Order of Mugunghwa (7 February 1966)
  - Grand Gwanghwa Medal of the Order of Diplomatic Service Merit (7 February 1966)

=== Places named after her ===
Several places were named after her, including:

- Tengku Ampuan Intan Zaharah Road (Federal Route 65) in Kuala Nerus, Terengganu
- SMK Tengku Intan Zaharah in Dungun, Terengganu
- SK Tengku Ampuan Intan in Kuala Berang, Terengganu
- SMK Tengku Ampuan Intan in Kuala Berang, Terengganu
- Tengku Ampuan Intan Zaharah Mosque in Dungun, Terengganu

== See also ==
- Yang di-Pertuan Agong
- Raja Permaisuri Agong

Malaysian royalty
| Preceded by Tengku Budriah (Raja Perempuan of Perlis) | Raja Permaisuri Agong (Queen of Malaysia) | Succeeded by Tuanku Bahiyah (Sultanah of Kedah) |
