= Tengku Ampuan Bariah =

Queen consort of Terengganu from 1979 to 1998

Bariah بارية

Tengku Ampuan Besar of Terengganu
- Tenure: 21 September 1979 – 14 May 1998
- Coronation: 21 March 1981
- Predecessor: Tengku Ampuan Intan Zaharah
- Successor: Sultanah Nur Zahirah (as Sultanah)

Tengku Ampuan of Terengganu
- Tenure: 14 May 1998 – 21 March 2011
- Predecessor: Tengku Ampuan Tua Intan Zaharah
- Born: 31 August 1933; Klang, Selangor, Malaya
- Died: 21 March 2011 (aged 77); Seri Kota Specialist Hospital, Klang, Selangor, Malaysia
- Burial: 21 March 2011; Royal Mausoleum, Masjid Al-Muktafi Billah Shah, Kuala Terengganu
- Spouse: Sultan Mahmud Al-Muktafi Billah Shah (m. 1951; died 1998)
Names
- Tengku Bariah binti Tengku Alam Shah (as birth)
- House: Opu Daeng Chelak
- Father: Sultan Hisamuddin Alam Shah Al-Haj Ibni Al-Marhum Sultan Alauddin Sulaiman Shah
- Mother: Cik Puan Hajah Kalsum binti Haji Mahmud
- Religion: Sunni Islam

Tengku Ampuan Hajah Bariah binti Almarhum Sultan Hisamuddin Alam Shah Al-Haj (Jawi: تڠكو امڤوان حاجه بارية بنت المرحوم سلطان حسام الدين عالم شاه الحاج; 31 August 1933 – 21 March 2011) was the Tengku Ampuan Besar (Queen consort) of Terengganu from 1979 to 1998 as the wife of Sultan Mahmud Al-Muktafi Billah Shah. She was the sister of the late Sultan of Selangor, Almarhum Sultan Salahuddin Abdul Aziz Shah and the stepmother of the current Sultan of Terengganu, Sultan Mizan Zainal Abidin.

== Biography ==
Tengku Bariah was born on 31 August 1933 in Klang, Selangor, to Tengku Alam Shah of Selangor (later Sultan Hisamuddin) and his second wife, Cik Puan Kalsum binti Mahmud. She was educated at Malay School, Klang, Malay Girls' College (now known as Kolej Tunku Kurshiah), Kuala Lumpur, and then Cuckfield Park College, Sussex.

On 22 March 1951, she married Tengku Mahmud Sultan Ismail Nasiruddin, the then-Yang di-Pertuan Muda (Crown Prince) of Terengganu, in Kuala Lumpur. She was granted the title Tengku Puan Muda (roughly Crown Princess) on 7 April 1954.

In 1979, Tengku Mahmud became Sultan of Terengganu. She became the Tengku Ampuan Besar (Queen) on 20 September 1979. Her husband reigned until 1998, and was succeeded by her stepson Tengku Mizan Zainal Abidin.

After her husband's death, she became known as the Tengku Ampuan (Dowager Queen), while her stepmother-in-law, Tengku Intan Zaharah, became the Tengku Ampuan Tua (more senior title). She retained her position as a senior member of the Selangor royal court. She attended the coronation ceremony of her nephew, Sultan Sharafuddin Idris Shah on 8 March 2003.

Tengku Ampuan Bariah died on 21 March 2011 at Seri Kota Hospital, Klang, during her stepson's reign as Yang di-Pertuan Agong. She was buried at the royal mausoleum near Masjid Al-Muktafi Billah Shah in Kuala Terengganu, next to grave of her late husband. Her funeral was attended by the Yang di-Pertuan Agong, Tuanku Mizan Zainal Abidin, the Raja Permaisuri Agong, Tuanku Nur Zahirah, the Raja Perempuan of Perlis, Tengku Fauziah Tengku Abdul Rashid, the Tengku Puan of Pahang, Tunku Azizah Aminah Maimunah Iskandariah, and members of the Selangor, Johor, Kedah and Negeri Sembilan royal families.

== Honours ==
=== Honours of Terengganu ===
- First Class of the Family Order of Terengganu (DK I, 16 September 1979)
- Member Grand Companion of the Order of Sultan Mahmud I of Terengganu (SSMT)
- Knight Grand Commander of the Order of the Crown of Terengganu (SPMT, 26 June 1964)

=== Honours of Malaysia ===
- Selangor
  - First Class of the Royal Family Order of Selangor (DK, 10 October 1985)

Malaysian royalty
Preceded by Tengku Intan Zaharah; Tengku Ampuan Besar	Consort of the Sultan of Terengganu; Tengku Ampuan Besar; 1979–1998	Succeeded by Sultanah Nur Zahirah; Sultanah
