= Family tree of Malaysian monarchs =

The following is family tree of the monarchs of Malaysia. The head of state is the Yang di-Pertuan Agong (King of Malaysia). The position is elective but only the hereditary rulers of the states of Johor, Kedah, Kelantan, Negeri Sembilan, Pahang, Perak, Perlis, Selangor and Terengganu are eligible. He holds office for five years and uses the style of "Majesty".

Family tree of Malaysian monarchs
Patrilineal descent
Matrlineal descent

Singapura- Melaka est. 1299
House of Melaka-Johor est. 1528	House of Melaka-Perak est. 1528	House of Melaka-Pahang est. 1470
House of Bendahara est. 1699
Negeri; Sembilan est. 1773	Selangor est. 1745	Perlis est. 1834	Terengganu est. 1708	Kedah est. 1136	Kelantan est. 1721	Pahang est. 1699	Johor est. 1886	Perak est. 1636
Abdul; Rahman; Yang di-Pertuan Agong I r. 1957–1960	Hisamuddin; Yang di-Pertuan Agong II r. 1960	Syed Putra; Yang di-Pertuan Agong III r. 1960–1965	Ismail; Nasiruddin; Yang di-Pertuan Agong IV r. 1965–1970	Abdul Halim; Yang di-Pertuan Agong V r. 1970-1975; Yang di-Pertuan Agong XIV r. 2011–2016	Yahya Petra; Yang di-Pertuan Agong VI r. 1975–1979	Ahmad Shah; Yang di-Pertuan Agong VII r. 1979–1984	Iskandar; Yang di-Pertuan Agong VIII r. 1984–1989	Azlan Shah; Yang di-Pertuan Agong IX r. 1989–1994
Munawir	Mahmud	Ismail Petra
Ja'far; Yang di-Pertuan Agong X r. 1994–1999	Salahuddin; Yang di-Pertuan Agong XI r. 1999–2001	Sirajuddin; Yang di-Pertuan Agong XII r. 2001–2006	Mizan; Yang di-Pertuan Agong XIII r. 2006–2011	Sallehuddin	Muhammad V Yang di-Pertuan Agong XV r. 2016–2019	Abdullah; Yang di-Pertuan Agong XVI r. 2019–2024	Ibrahim; Yang di-Pertuan Agong XVII r. 2024–present
