= Malaysia Federal Route 174 =

Road in Malaysia

Federal Route 174
- Jalan Sultan Mahmud; Jalan Sultan Zainal Abidin

Route information
- Length: 3.31 km (2.06 mi)

Major junctions
- South end: Batu Burok
- FT 3 AH18 Federal Route 3
- North end: Pasar Payang

Location
- Country: Malaysia
- Primary destinations: Ladang

Highway system
- Highways in Malaysia; Expressways; Federal; State

Federal Route 174 comprising Jalan Sultan Zainal Abidin and Jalan Sultan Mahmud is a federal road in Kuala Terengganu, Terengganu, Malaysia. The Kilometre Zero of the Federal Route 174 starts at Batu Burok.

== Features ==
At most sections, the Federal Route 174 was built under the JKR R5 road standard, with a speed limit of 90 km/h.

== List of junctions ==
=== Jalan Sultan Mahmud ===
| Km | Exit | Junctions | To | Remarks |
|---|---|---|---|---|
| FT 174; 0 | | Batu Burok | East; Jalan Pantai Batu Burok; Pantai Batu Burok West; FT 3 AH18 Jalan Kamaruddin; Cabang Tiga; Kuala Berang; Kota Bharu; Islamic Heritage Park South; FT 3 AH18 Jalan Sultan Mahmud; Marang; Kuantan; Masjid Tengku Tengah Zaharah | Junctions |
FT 174 Jalan Sultan Mahmud
| | | Istana Nur Nadhirah | | |
| | | Stadium Negeri | | |
| | | Hospital Sultanah Nur Zahirah | Hospital Sultanah Nur Zahirah | |
| | | Jalan Persinggahan | East; Jalan Persinggahan; Masjid Al-Muktafi Billah Shah; Primula Beach Resort; Pantai Batu Burok; Pusat Akuatik Negeri Terengganu | South bound |
| | | Masjid Al-Muktafi Billah Shah | Masjid Al-Muktafi Billah Shah; Mosque; New Terengganu's Royal Mausoleum | |
FT 174 Jalan Sultan Mahmud
| | | Ladang Roundabout (Bulatan Batu Bersurat) | Northwest; Jalan Sultan Ismail; City Centre; Wisma Darul Iman North; Jalan Sultan Sulaiman; Masjid Abidin | Roundabout |

=== Jalan Sultan Zainal Abidin ===
| Km | Exit | Junctions | To | Remarks |
|---|---|---|---|---|
FT 174 Jalan Sultan Zainal Abidin
| | | Hotel Grand Continental Kuala Terengganu | | |
| | | Jalan Tok Lam | | |
| | | Jalan Masjid Abidin | South; Jalan Masjid Abidin; Masjid Abidin | |
| | | Istana Maziah | | |
FT 174 Jalan Sultan Zainal Abidin
| | | Pasar Payang | | |
