= Family tree of Terengganuan monarchs =

Few traces remain as to the identity of Terengganu's early rulers. Whats is known is that a trading port was established from as early as the 13th century. Terengganu Inscription Stone attests to the 14th century's first muslim ruler of the state, Raja Mandalika, from the Telanai dynasty. In the late 15th century, the Telanai dynasty came to an end when a Pahang Hulubalang, Sri Akar Diraja, killed Tun Telanai for offending Sultan Ahmad of Pahang. It is believed that Terengganu was later ruled by Sri Akar Diraja's family, before they were eventually replaced by the Megat family.

From 15th century to 18th century, Terengganu continued to pay allegiance to Sultans of Melaka, Pahang and then Johor. Towards the end of the 17th century, Bendahara of Johor, Tun Habib Abdul Majid ordered three Johor noblemen to take over administration of the state from the Megat family. Johor continued to appoint rulers of Terengganu until 1708, when a son of Tun Habib, Tun Zainal Abidin was installed as Ruler of Terengganu. The following is family tree of the Malay monarchs of Terengganu, from the establishment of the sultanate in 1708 until present day.

House of Bendahara-Terengganu

House of Bendahara
Zainal; Abidin I^{(1)} r. 1708-1733
Mansur I^{(2)} r. 1733-1794
Zainal; Abidin II^{(3)} r. 1794-1808	Tengku; Muhammad; Kelantan r. 1794-1800
Ahmad I^{(4)} r. 1808-1830	Abdul; Rahman^{(5)} r. 1830	Mansur II^{(7)} r. 1831-1837
Daud^{(6)} r. 1831	Omar^{(9)} r. 1831 r. 1839-1876	Tengku Mahmud	Muhammad I^{(8)} r. 1837-1839
Ahmad II^{(10)} r. 1876-1881
Zainal; Abidin III^{(11)} r. 1881-1918
Muhammad II^{(12)} r. 1918-1920	Sulaiman; Badrul Alam^{(13)} r. 1920-1942	Ismail Nasiruddin^{(15)} r. 1945-1979; YDP Agong IV r. 1965-1970
Ali^{(14)} r. 1942-1945	Mahmud^{(16)} r. 1979-1998
Mizan; Zainal Abidin^{(17)} r. 1998-present YDP Agong XIII r. 2006-2011
Tengku Muhammad Ismail; Yang di-Pertuan; Muda Terengganu

== Bibliography ==
- Ahmad Sarji Abdul Hamid (2011), The Encyclopedia of Malaysia, vol. 16 - The Rulers of Malaysia, Editions Didier Millet, ISBN 978-981-3018-54-9
- Linehan, William (1973), History of Pahang, Malaysian Branch Of The Royal Asiatic Society, Kuala Lumpur, ISBN 978-0710-101-37-2
