= Order of the Crown of the Realm =

Malaysia federal award

Awarded by the King of Malaysia
- Type: State Order
- Established: 16 August 1958
- Ribbon: Yellow with a red central stripe and blue-edged white edge stripes.
- Motto: "Berpegang Tegoh Pada Allah"(old Malay) (Faithful to God)
- Awarded for: the Raja Permaisuri Agong (Queen) and Malaysian rulers, foreign Heads of State and other distinguished individuals.
- Status: Currently constituted
- Sovereign: Sultan Ibrahim, King of Malaysia
- Grades: Grand Recipient
- Post-nominals: D.M.N.

Statistics
- First induction: 1958
- Last induction: 2026
- Total inductees: 46 Normal Grand Recipients; 70 Honorary Grand Recipients

Precedence
- Next (higher): Order of the Royal Family of Malaysia
- Next (lower): Order of the Defender of the Realm
- The ribbon of the order

The Most Exalted Order of the Crown of the Realm (Malay: Darjah Utama Seri Mahkota Negara) is a Malaysian federal award. It is ranked lower than the Order of the Royal Family of Malaysia.

It should not be confused with the Order of Loyalty to the Crown of Malaysia.

== Classes and recipients ==
It has one rank and is conferred on 30 living recipients only at any time. It is conferred to the Queen of Malaysia and newly appointed Malay rulers in his state. Fifteen, out of the total, are conferred on foreign princes, foreign Heads of State and other distinguished individuals. It does not carry any title.

== Insignia ==
The D.M.N. comprises a collar, a star, and a badge.

- There are two sheathed kris crossed upright in the centre of the collar.
- The nine-pointed star and the crescent moon of the award are made of gold.
- The badge is a five-pointed star with the jawi verse of Allah on top of the crown, which has a crescent and motto "Berpegang Tegoh Pada Allah" below the crown. (The current spelling of the motto should be "Berpegang Teguh Pada Allah", but amendments of the new spelling is not made)
- The sash is of yellow silk. In the centre are red stripes and the end is tied with a ribbon. The edges of the ribbon have white narrow stripes lying in between two blue stripes. The sash of the order is worn from the left shoulder to the right hip.

The Order was instituted on 16 August 1958 and gazetted on 21 August 1958.

== Grand Recipients ==
Official source

=== D.M.N. ===
The grand recipients do not receive any title.

- 1958: Abdul Rahman, Yang di-Pertuan Besar of Negeri Sembilan
- 1958: Abu Bakar, Sultan of Pahang
- 1958: Hisamuddin, Sultan of Selangor
- 1958: Ibrahim, Sultan of Johor
- 1958: Ibrahim IV, Sultan of Kelantan
- 1958: Ismail Nasiruddin, Sultan of Terengganu
- 1958: Putra, Raja of Perlis
- 1958: Yusuf Izzudin Shah, Sultan of Perak
- 1959: Abdul Halim, Sultan of Kedah
- 1960: Ismail, Sultan of Johor
- 1961: Munawir, Yang di-Pertuan Besar of Negeri Sembilan
- 1961: Yahya Petra, Sultan of Kelantan
- 1961: Salahuddin, Sultan of Selangor
- 1962: Budriah, Raja Permaisuri Agong
- 1963: Idris Shah II, Sultan of Perak
- 1966: Intan Zaharah, Raja Permaisuri Agong
- 1968: Ja'afar, Yang di-Pertuan Besar of Negeri Sembilan
- 1970: Tunku Abdul Rahman, Prime Minister of Malaysia
- 1971: Bahiyah, Raja Permaisuri Agong
- 1974: Ahmad Shah, Sultan of Pahang
- 1976: Abdul Razak Hussein, Prime Minister of Malaysia
- 1976: Zainab, Raja Permaisuri Agong
- 1979: Ismail Petra of Kelantan, Sultan of Kelantan
- 1979: Afzan, Raja Permaisuri Agong
- 1980: Kurshiah, Raja Permaisuri Agong
- 1981: Mahmud, Sultan of Terengganu
- 1984: Iskandar, Sultan of Johor
- 1984: Zanariah, Raja Permaisuri Agong
- 1985: Azlan Shah, Sultan of Perak
- 1989: Bainun, Raja Permaisuri Agong
- 1994: Najihah, Raja Permaisuri Agong
- 1999: Siti Aishah, Raja Permaisuri Agong
- 1999: Mizan Zainal Abidin, Sultan of Terengganu
- 2001: Sirajuddin, Raja of Perlis
- 2002: Fauziah, Raja Permaisuri Agong
- 2003: Sharafuddin, Sultan of Selangor
- 2007: Nur Zahirah, Raja Permaisuri Agong
- 2009: Muhriz, Yang di-Pertuan Besar of Negeri Sembilan
- 2011: Muhammad V, Sultan of Kelantan
- 2012: Haminah, Raja Permaisuri Agong
- 2014: Nazrin Shah, Sultan of Perak
- 2015: Ibrahim Ismail, Sultan of Johor
- 2018: Sallehuddin, Sultan of Kedah
- 2019: Abdullah, Sultan of Pahang
- 2019: Azizah, Raja Permaisuri Agong
- 2024: Raja Zarith Sofiah, Raja Permaisuri Agong

== Honorary Grand Recipients ==
=== D.M.N. (K) ===
The honorary grand recipients do not receive any title.

- 1958: Omar Ali Saifuddien III, Sultan of Brunei
- 1959: Carlos P. Garcia, President of the Republic of the Philippines
- 1960: Ngo Dinh Diem, President of the Republic of Vietnam
- 1962: Ayub Khan, President of the Islamic Republic of Pakistan
- 1962: Bhumibol Adulyadej, King of Thailand
- 1962: Sirikit, Queen consort of Thailand
- 1963: Norodom Sihanouk, Head of State of Cambodia
- 1964: Norodom Kantol, Prime Minister of Cambodia
- 1964: Sisowath Kossamak, Queen Mother of Cambodia
- 1964: Hirohito, Emperor of Japan
- 1965: Park Chung-hee, President of the Republic of Korea
- 1965: Yuk Young-soo, First Lady of the Republic of Korea
- 1965: Gamal Abdel Nasser, President of the Arab Republic of Egypt
- 1965: Hussein bin Talal, King of Jordan
- 1965: Tahia Kazem, First Lady the Arab Republic of Egypt
- 1967: Wilhelmine Lübke, Spouse of the Federal President of Federal Republic of Germany
- 1967: Heinrich Lübke, Federal President of the Federal Republic of Germany
- 1968: Haile Selassie, Emperor of Ethiopia
- 1968: Imelda Marcos, First Lady of the Republic of the Philippines
- 1968: Ferdinand Marcos, President of the Republic of the Philippines
- 1968: Mohammad Reza Pahlavi, Shah of Iran
- 1968: Farah Pahlavi, Empress consort of Iran
- 1970: Akihito, Crown Prince of Japan
- 1970: Michiko, Crown Princess of Japan
- 1970: Suharto, President of the Republic of Indonesia
- 1970: Siti Hartinah, First Lady of the Republic of Indonesia
- 1972: Elizabeth II, Queen of the United Kingdom and the other Commonwealth realms
- 1980: Hassanal Bolkiah, Sultan of Brunei
- 1980: Jaber Al-Ahmad Al-Sabah, Emir of Kuwait
- 1981: Chun Doo-hwan, President of the Republic of Korea
- 1981: Lee Soon-ja, First Lady of the Republic of Korea
- 1982: Khalid bin Abdulaziz Al Saud, King of Saudi Arabia
- 1982: Nicolae Ceaușescu, President of the Republic of Romania
- 1986: Richard von Weizsäcker, Federal President of the Federal Republic of Germany
- 1986: Marianne von Weizsäcker, Spouse of the Federal President of Federal Republic of Germany
- 1988: Roh Tae-woo, President of the Republic of Korea
- 1988: Kim Ok-suk, First Lady of the Republic of Korea
- 1990: Carlos Andrés Pérez, President of the Bolivarian Republic of Venezuela
- 1991: Carlos Salinas de Gortari, President of the United Mexican States
- 1991: Carlos Menem, President of the Argentine Republic
- 1991: Fernando Collor de Mello, President of the Federative Republic of Brazil
- 1991: Qaboos bin Said al Said, Sultan of Oman
- 1991: Patricio Aylwin, President of the Republic of Chile
- 1995: Eduardo Frei Ruiz-Tagle, President of the Republic of Chile
- 1995: Fernando Henrique Cardoso, President of the Federative Republic of Brazil
- 1995: Fidel Ramos, President of the Republic of the Philippines
- 1995: Juan Carlos, King of Spain
- 1995: Martti Ahtisaari, President of the Republic of Finland
- 1996: Alberto Fujimori, President of the Republic of Peru
- 1996: Carl XVI Gustaf, King of Sweden
- 1996: Julio María Sanguinetti, President of the Oriental Republic of Uruguay
- 1996: Kim Young-sam, President of the Republic of Korea
- 1996: Norodom Monineath, Queen consort of Cambodia
- 1997: Aleksander Kwaśniewski, President of the Republic of Poland
- 1997: Roman Herzog, Federal President of the Federal Republic of Germany
- 1998: Hassan Gouled Aptidon, President of the Republic of Djibouti
- 2000: Hamad bin Isa Al Khalifa, King of Bahrain
- 2001: Andrés Pastrana Arango, President of the Republic of Colombia
- 2001: Fidel Castro, President of the Council of State of Cuba
- 2002: Stjepan Mesić, President of the Republic of Croatia
- 2003: Carlo Azeglio Ciampi, President of the Italian Republic
- 2005: Silvia, Queen consort of Sweden
- 2007: Susilo Bambang Yudhoyono, President of the Republic of Indonesia
- 2009: Michelle Bachelet, President of the Republic of Chile
- 2010: Hamad bin Khalifa Al Thani, Emir of Qatar
- 2017: Salman bin Abdulaziz Al Saud, King of Saudi Arabia
- 2019: Saleha, Queen consort of Brunei
- 2022: Recep Tayyip Erdogan, President of the Republic of Turkey
- 2023: Albert II, Prince of Monaco, Sovereign Prince of Monaco
- 2023: Mohamed bin Zayed Al Nahyan, President of the United Arab Emirates and Ruler of Abu Dhabi
- 2026: Abdel Fattah el-Sisi, President of Egypt
- 2026: Abdullah II, king of Jordan
