= Syarqiyyah Palace =

Istana Syarqiyyah ايستان شرقية
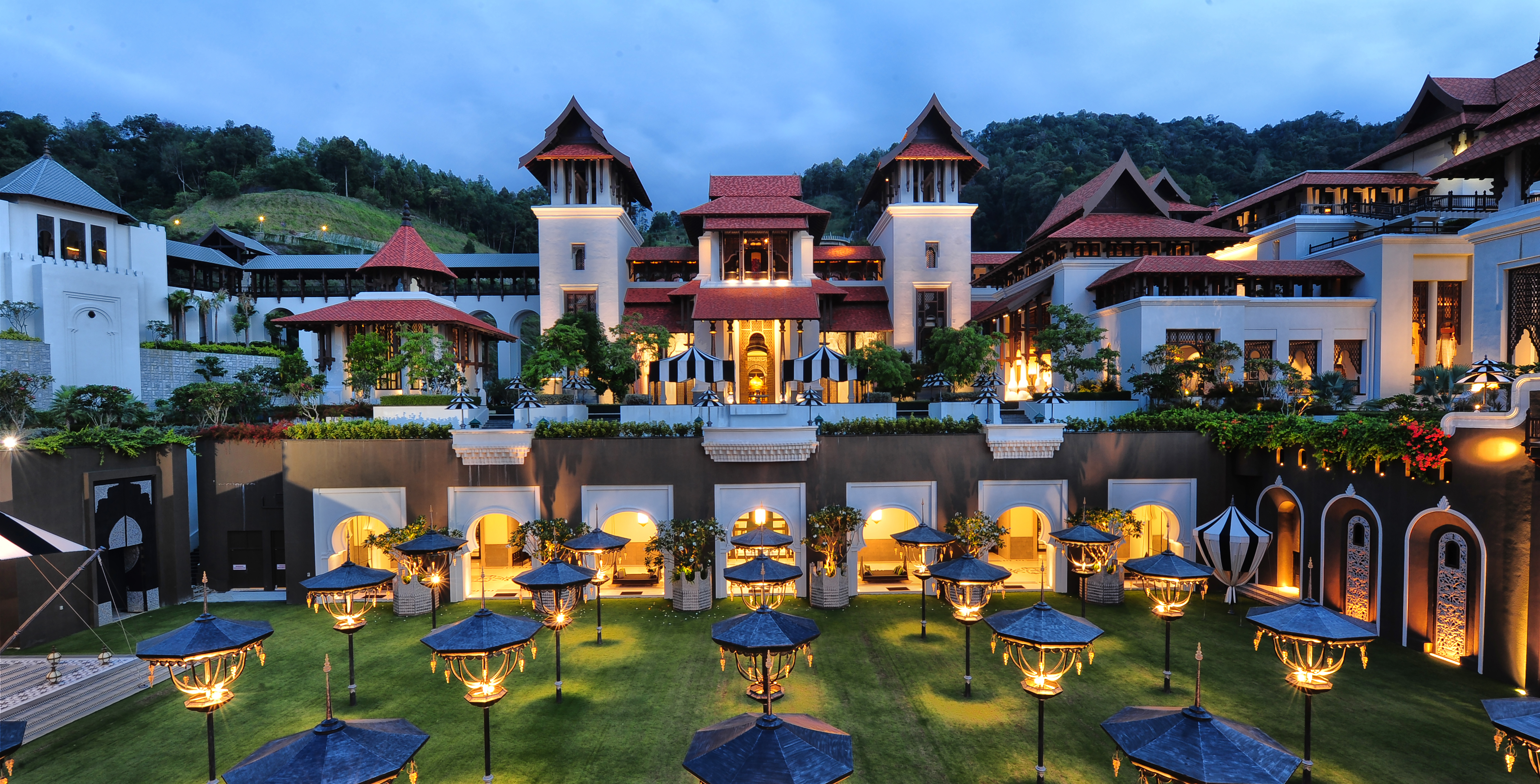
- picture date 6 July 2014
- Interactive map of the Istana Syarqiyyah ايستان شرقية area

General information
- Type: Official palace for Sultan of Terengganu
- Location: Kuala Terengganu, Terengganu, Malaysia
- Construction started: 2006
- Completed: 2014
- Owner: Sultan Mizan Zainal Abidin

Technical details
- Floor count: 3

Design and construction
- Architect: Bill Bensley

Syarqiyyah palace (Malay: Istana Syarqiyyah) is the palace in Malaysia located in Bukit Chendering, Kuala Terengganu, Terengganu. This palace is the main palace of the Sultan of Terengganu and all official ceremonies will take place at the palace. Inside the palace area is also the main residence for the sultan and the royal families of Terengganu. The name of Syarqiyyah is from Arabic means 'East Gem'. It is known that the palace cost an estimated RM1 Billion for construction.

== Construction ==
The palace with size around 160,000 square feet was built in 2006 contains 4 phases and was fully completed in 2014. The first and second phases of the construction of the palace complex involved earthworks, construction of retaining walls, ponds, drainage, plumbing, cables, administrative office, ceremonial hall, pump house as well as mechanical and electrical works. The third and fourth phases involve earthworks, ceremonial halls, palace guard offices, suraus, halls, streets, parking lots, Islamic halls and the main residence of Sultan as well as interior decoration works and so on.

== Architecture ==
Syarqiyyah palace features a combination of traditional Terengganu architecture and Islamic architecture in a historic building in Granada, Spain, the Alhambra. It's featuring

- 5,000 unique paintings spanning up to 9 meters in length.
- Over 100 rooms that have different designs for each.
- 14 tons of bronze doors.
- The hall is three storeys high.
- 865 acres of land, surrounded by forest.
- Ballroom for 1,200 people.
- Dining hall for 1,800 people without any support poles.
- Fountains and towers in the garden.
