= Sultanah Nur Zahirah =

Sultanah of Terengganu since 1998

Nur Zahirah نور ظاهرة
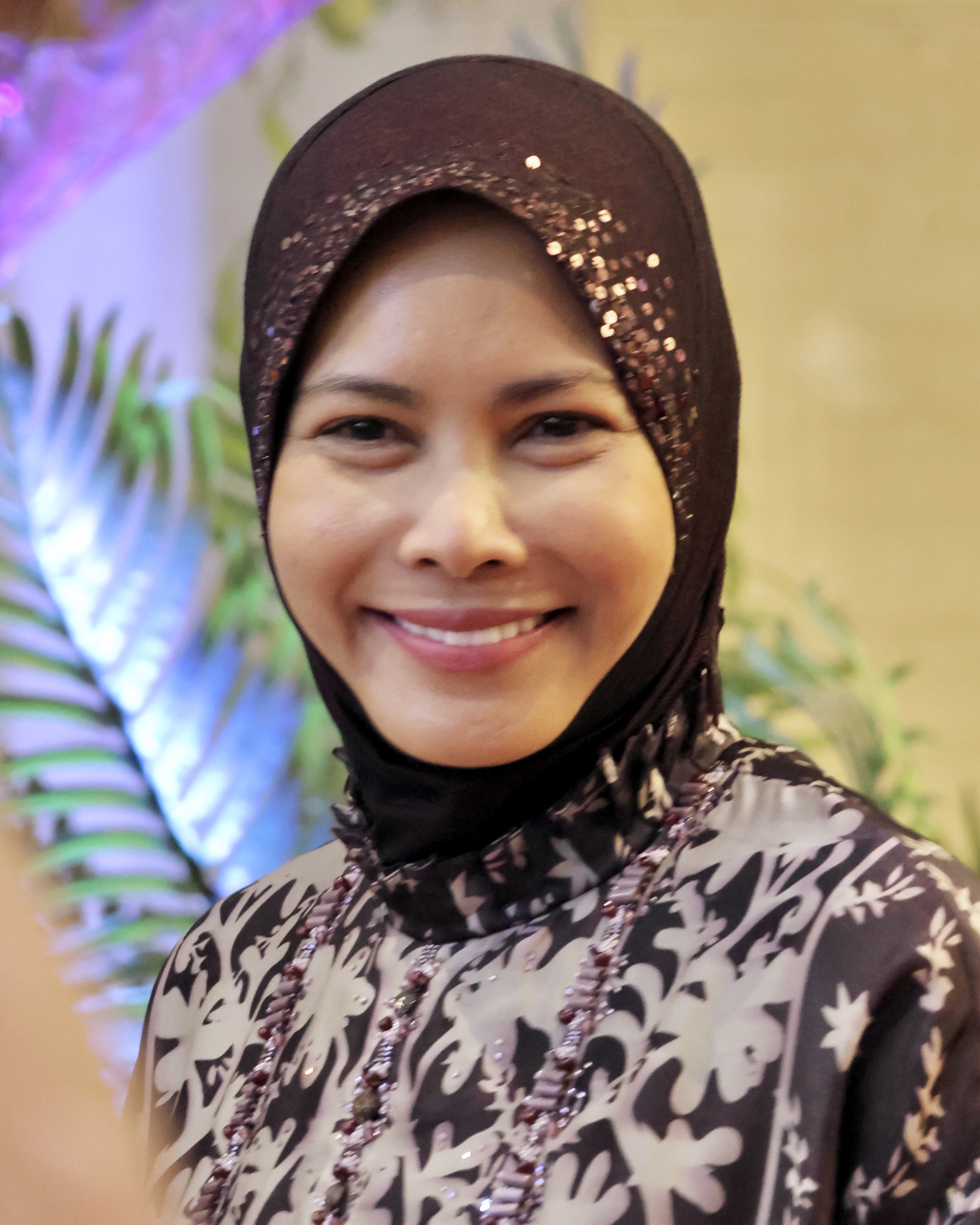
- Sultanah Nur Zahirah in 2023

Queen consort of Malaysia
- Tenure: 13 December 2006 – 12 December 2011
- Installation: 26 April 2007
- Predecessor: Tuanku Fauziah
- Successor: Tuanku Hajah Haminah

Sultanah of Terengganu
- Tenure: 12 July 1998 – present
- Coronation: 4 March 1999
- Predecessor: Tengku Ampuan Bariah (as Tengku Ampuan Besar)
- Born: 7 December 1973 (age 52); Alor Star, Kedah, Malaysia
- Spouse: Sultan Mizan Zainal Abidin (m. 1996)
- Issue: Tengku Nadhirah Zahrah; Tengku Muhammad Ismail; Tengku Muhammad Mua′az; Tengku Fatimatuz Zahra’
Names
- Rozita binti Adil Bakeri (at birth)
Regnal name
- Sultanah Nur Zahirah
- House: Bendahara (by marriage)
- Father: Adil Bakeri
- Mother: Nur Rahmah binti Haji Mohd Zain
- Religion: Sunni Islam

Sultanah Nur Zahirah (Jawi: سلطانة نور ظاهرة; née Rozita binti Adil Bakeri; born 7 December 1973) is the current Sultanah of Terengganu as the wife of Sultan Mizan Zainal Abidin. She was the 13th Raja Permaisuri Agong (Queen of Malaysia) from 2006 to 2011.

== Early life ==
Born Rozita binti Adil Bakeri on 7 December 1973 in Alor Star, Kedah, Malaysia. She received her primary school education at Sekolah Rendah Jenis Kebangsaan St. Nicholas' Convent, and her secondary school education at Sekolah Menengah St. Nicholas' Convent, both in Alor Star, Kedah, where she was a student librarian and Girl Guides member. She also attended a course in the field of human resources.

== Royal life ==
She married Tengku Mizan Zainal Abidin, the then Yang di-Pertuan Muda (Crown Prince) of Terengganu on 28 March 1996 in Kuala Terengganu. She was then known as To' Puan Seri Rozita binti Adil Bakeri.

She was accorded the title of Her Royal Highness Permaisuri Nur Zahirah, Permaisuri of Terengganu on 19 July 1998, after Sultan Mizan was proclaimed as the Sultan of Terengganu. Later, her title was changed to Her Royal Highness Sultanah Nur Zahirah, Sultanah of Terengganu on 5 June 2006 in accordance with the Sultan's wishes.

She was conferred the dignitary titles of the Darjah Kerabat Terengganu Yang Maha Mulia Darjah Yang Pertama (D.K.) known as Order of Royal Family on 16 January 1999 and Bintang Kebesaran Darjah Seri Setia Sultan Mahmud Terengganu Yang Amat Terpuji (S.S.M.T.) or Grand Companion of the Order of Sultan Mahmud I of Terengganu on 9 July 1998. She also was awarded the Darjah Utama Seri Mahkota Negara (D.M.N.) – Grand Order of Nation Crown on 5 April 2007 when she became Her Majesty Seri Paduka Baginda Raja Permaisuri Agong of Malaysia.

== Family life ==
The royal couple have four children:

- Her Highness Tengku Nadhirah Zahrah, the Tengku Puteri Utama Raja (born 18 December 1996).
- His Royal Highness Tengku Muhammad Ismail, the Yang di-Pertuan Muda of Terengganu (born 1 March 1998).
- His Highness Tengku Muhammad Mua′az, the Tengku Sri Setia Mahkota Raja (born 22 December 2000).
- Her Highness Tengku Fatimatuz Zahra’, the Tengku Puteri Daulath Raja (born 19 April 2002).

== Social contributions ==
She played a major role during the humanitarian response to the 2004 Indian Ocean earthquake by collecting donations which were successfully distributed to victims through both the Acheh and Kedah governments. The list of generosity of the Sultanah includes involving herself with programmes to assist the poor and those with special needs.

In 2006, the Yayasan DiRaja Sultan Mizan, a local foundation of the royal family of Terengganu, represented by the queen distributed milk bottle especially for cleft-lipped babies, breast pumps for mothers and related devices to help people with eyesight problems through Hospital Sultanah Nur Zahirah.

She is the patron of various organisations, uniformed bodies and educational institutions in the Terengganu State. The organisations under the Sultanah consist of:

- Majlis Kebajikan dan Pembangunan Masyarakat (for social welfare and development).
- Pertubuhan Kebajikan Anak Yatim Terengganu (known as PERKAYA for the welfare of orphans).
- Persatuan Hospis Terengganu.
- Persatuan Ibu Bapa dan Guru SK Pusat Bukit Besar, Terengganu.
- Girl Guide Association of Terengganu.

She is also the Chancellor of Universiti Sultan Zainal Abidin (UniSZA) and Universiti Malaysia Terengganu (UMT).

Another important accomplishment is the Tadika An Nur, a well established pre-school in Terengganu pioneered by the Sultanah. This pre-school prospered when she planned to give an early form of education for her children. She is currently the Patron of Tadika An Nur which has now been opened to the public.

== Awards and recognitions ==
Sultanah Nur Zahirah was conferred with an honorary doctorate in management at a special convocation of Universiti Malaysia Terengganu in 2006. She received the degree from Sultan Mizan, who was the university's chancellor. In her speech at the event, she urged the people of Terengganu to take the initiative to emulate the excellent accomplishments of past Muslim scholars in fields of knowledge, especially in science and technology.

She was awarded:

=== Terengganu honours ===
- First Class of the Family Order of Terengganu (DK I) (16 January 1999)
- Knight Grand Companion of the Order of Sultan Mizan Zainal Abidin of Terengganu (SSMZ) – Dato' Seri (8 April 2004)
- Member Grand Companion of the Order of Sultan Mahmud I of Terengganu (SSMT) – Dato' Seri (9 July 1998)

=== Malaysian honours ===
- Malaysia
  - Recipient of the Order of the Crown of the Realm (DMN) (5 April 2007)
- Kedah
  - Member of the Royal Family Order of Kedah (DK) (21 January 2002)

=== Foreign honours ===
- Thailand
  - Dame Grand Cross of the Order of Chula Chom Klao (9 March 2009)

=== Places named after her ===
Several places were named after her, including:

- Sultanah Nur Zahirah Hospital in Kuala Terengganu, Terengganu
- Sultanah Nur Zahirah Mosque in Marang, Terengganu
- SK Permaisuri Nur Zahirah, a primary school in Besut, Terengganu
- SMK Permaisuri Nur Zahirah, a secondary school in Besut, Terengganu

== Trivia ==
Sultanah Nur Zahirah is the second Raja Permaisuri Agong after Permaisuri Siti Aishah of Selangor who wears the headscarf (tudong) on a daily basis. She is also the third commoner to become the Raja Permaisuri Agong, after Tuanku Bainun binti Mohamad Ali of Perak and Tuanku Permaisuri Siti Aishah of Selangor.

== See also ==
- Yang Di-Pertuan Agong
- Raja Permaisuri Agong

Malaysian royalty
Preceded by Tuanku Fauziah (Raja Perempuan of Perlis)	Raja Permaisuri Agong (Queen of Malaysia)	Succeeded by Sultanah Haminah (Sultanah of Kedah)
