= Abidin Mosque =

Mosque in Kuala Terengganu, Terengganu, Malaysia

- Masjid Abidin مسجد عابدين
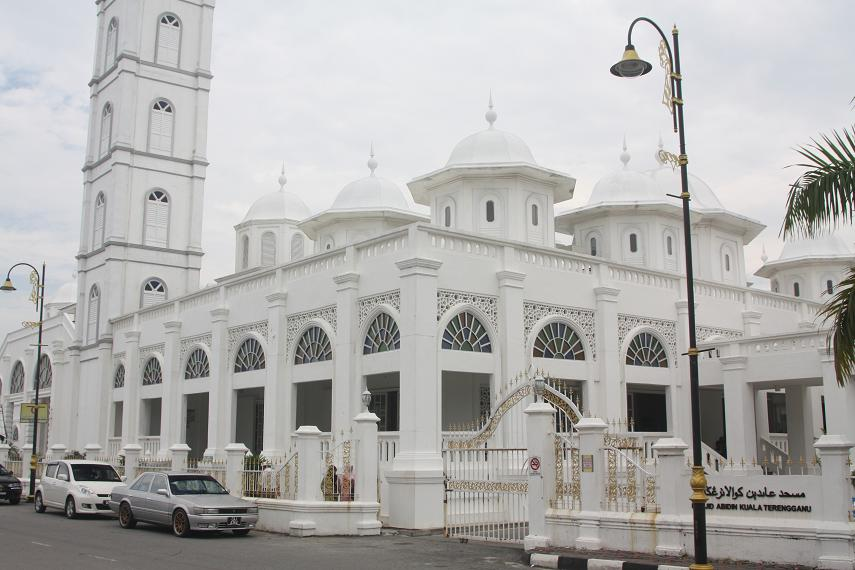

- Location within Terengganu

Religion
- Affiliation: Islam
- Branch/tradition: Sunni

Location
- Location: Kuala Terengganu, Terengganu, Malaysia
- Coordinates: 5.3346°N 103.1379°E

Architecture
- Type: mosque
- Groundbreaking: 1793
- Completed: 1808
- Minaret: 1

The Abidin Mosque (Malay: Masjid Abidin) is Terengganu's old state royal mosque built by Sultan Zainal Abidin II between 1793 and 1808. The mosque, which is also known as the White Mosque or the Big Mosque, is located in Kuala Terengganu, Terengganu, Malaysia. The old Royal Mausoleum is situated near the mosque.

== History ==
This mosque was built by the late Sultan Zainal Abidin II (also known as Marhum Masjid) between 1793 until 1808. The original building material of the mosque was wood, but during the reign of Sultan Umar at around 1852, the mosque was replaced with one made out of bricks. In 1881, Sultan Ahmad II ibni Yang Dipertua Muda Tengku Mahmud constructed a new dome to replace the old one erected under Sultan Zainal Abidin II. A ceremony was conducted at 7.00am, Saturday, 1 Jumada al-Thani 1298AH (1881AD). In 1901 during the reign of Sultan Zainal Abidin III, the mosque went through another renovation. The mosque was enlarged to accommodate the growing number of people. Besides that, circular stone pillars were also erected, while three minarets were built.

The mosque was again renovated during the reign of Al-Sultan Ismail Nasiruddin Shah in 1972. The size of the mosque was now twice the original size. A tall minaret and new domes were constructed. Decorations such as several calligraphic carvings of verses from the Quran, prayers and arabesques were carved on the mosque’s entrance doors and grills. The current uniquely carved mimbar was crafted by Mister Abdul Kadir.

== Terengganu Royal Mausoleum ==
The members of the royal family who have been buried here include:

=== Sultan graves ===
- Sultan Mansur Riayat Shah I ibni Sultan Zainal Abidin Shah I (died: 1811)
- Sultan Zainal Abidin Shah II ibni Sultan Mansur Riayat Shah I (died: 1811)
- Sultan Daud Riayat Shah ibni Sultan Ahmad Muazzam Shah I (died: 1836)
- Sultan Mansur Riayat Shah II ibni Sultan Zainal Abidin Shah II (died: 1844)
- Sultan Omar Riayat Shah ibni Sultan Ahmad Muazzam Shah I (died: 1876)
- Sultan Zainal Abidin Shah III ibni Sultan Ahmad Muazzam Shah II (died: 1918)
- Sultan Muhammad Muazzam Shah II ibni Sultan Zainal Abidin Shah III (died: 1956)
- Sultan Sulaiman Badrul Alam Shah ibni Almarhum Sultan Zainal Abidin Shah III (died: 1942)
- Sultan Ali Badrul Alam Shah ibni Sultan Sulaiman Badrul Alam Shah (died: 1996)
- Sultan Ismail Nasiruddin Shah ibni Sultan Zainal Abidin Shah III – Fourth Yang di-Pertuan Agong (1965-1970) (died: 1979)

=== Tengku Ampuan Besar/Permaisuri (Queen) graves ===
- Tengku Kulsum binti Almarhum Sultan Muhammad Muazzam Shah I, (mother of Ismail I, died 1980)
- Tengku Ampuan Tua Intan Zaharah binti Almarhum Tengku Hitam Ommarr Shah – Fourth Raja Permaisuri Agong (1965-1970) (died: 2015)

=== Other royal families ===
- Tengku Abdul Halim Ibni Sultan Ali Badrul Alam Shah - (Yang di-Pertuan Muda XX) (dead; 1970) in Shaikh Ibrahim Cemetery
- Tengku Mahmud Ibni Sultan Sulaiman Badrul Alam Shah - (dead; 1915)
- Tengku Abdul Aziz Ibni Almarhum Sultan Sulaiman Badrul Alam Shah - (Tengku Sri Behdahara Raja X VIII) (dead; 1972)
- Tengku Abdul Rashid Ibni Almarhum Sultan Sulaiman Badrul Alam Shah - (Tengku Sri Temenggung Raja XX VIII) (dead; 2006)
- Tengku Abdullah Ibni Almarhum Sultan Muhammad Muazzam Shah II - (Tengku Sri Laksamana Raja XX VIII) (dead; 1999)
- Tengku Wuk Fatima Sabariah
- Tengku Zaharah
- Tengku Zaleha
- Tengku Nur Azia Iman
- Tengku Zainah
- Tengku Maria Noraishah
- Tengku Ramlah Azizah

=== Sultan Ahmad Hussain Muazzam Shah Family (Johor Old Royal Family) ===
- Tengku Ali Iskandar ibni Almarhum Sultan Haji Allauddin Alam al-Mu'azzam Shah I (died 1866)
- Tengku Ismail Hussain bin Almarhum Tengku Haji Ahmad Hussain al-Mu'azzam Shah II (died 2006)
- Tengku Muda Osman bin Almarhum Tengku Haji Abdul Jalil - (Tengku Muda) (died: 1866)
- Tengku Hitam Omar bin Almarhum Tengku Muda Osman - (Tengku Setia Diraja) and (MB Terengganu) (died: 1866)
- Tengku Ismail bin Almarhum Tengku Haji Ahmad Hussain (died 2006)
- Tengku Abdul Jadid ibni Almarhum Sultan Ahmad al-Mu'azzam Shah I - (Tok Penghulu Mukim Pulau Tekong,Singapura) (died: 1866)
- Tengku Ibrahim bin Almarhum Tengku Haji Ahmad Hussain - (Tengku Besar) (died: 2006)
- Tengku Haji Abdul Qadir bin Almarhum Tengku Haji Abdul Jalil (died: 2006)
- Tengku Che Abu Bakar bin Almarhum Tengku Haji Abdul Jalil (died: 2006)
- Tengku Ali Iskandar ibni Almarhum Tengku Haji Hitam Omar Sulaiman (died 1866)

== See also ==
- Islam in Malaysia
- Mosques in Malaysia
