= Family Order of Terengganu =

Honorific order of the Sultanate of Terengganu

Family Order of Terengganu Darjah Kebesaran Kerabat Terengganu Yang Amat Mulia

Awarded by Sultan of Terengganu
- Type: Order
- Status: Currently constituted
- Sovereign: Mizan Zainal Abidin of Terengganu
- Grades: Member 1st class (D.K. I); Member 2nd class (D.K. II)

Precedence
- Next (higher): Royal Family Order of Terengganu
- Next (lower): Order of Sultan Mizan Zainal Abidin of Terengganu; Order of Sultan Mahmud I of Terengganu (dormant)
- -- Ribbon bars of the order

The Most Distinguished Family Order of Terengganu (Bahasa Melayu: Darjah Kebesaran Kerabat Terengganu Yang Amat Mulia) is an honorific order of the Sultanate of Terengganu.

== History ==
It was founded by Sultan Ismail Nasiruddin of Terengganu on 19 June 1962 as a family order for members of the Terengganu and other Royal houses.

== Classes ==
It is awarded in two class:

- Member of the first class or Ahli Yang Pertama (Max. 16 recipients at any one time) - D.K. I
- Member of the second class or Ahli Yang Kedua (Max. 24 recipients) - D.K. II

== Recipients ==
- Abdul Halim of Kedah
- Tunku Abdul Malik
- Tunku Abdul Rahman
- Abdullah of Pahang
- Ahmad Shah of Pahang
- Azlan Shah of Perak
- Hussein Onn
- Ibrahim Iskandar of Johor
- Tengku Ampuan Tua Intan Zaharah
- Iskandar of Johor
- Ismail Petra of Kelantan
- Ja'afar of Negeri Sembilan
- Mahmud of Terengganu
- Mizan Zainal Abidin of Terengganu
- Muhammad V of Kelantan
- Muhriz of Negeri Sembilan
- Munawir of Negeri Sembilan
- Sultanah Nur Zahirah
- Sharafuddin of Selangor
- Sirajuddin of Perlis
- Tengku Baharuddin
- Vajiralongkorn
- Yahya Petra of Kelantan
