= Order of Sultan Mahmud I of Terengganu =

Dormant honorific order of the Sultanate of Terengganu

Order of Sultan Mahmud I of Terengganu Darjah Kebesaran Sultan Mahmud I Terengganu Yang Amat Terpuji

Awarded by Sultan of Terengganu
- Type: Order
- Status: Dormant since 1998
- Sovereign: Mizan Zainal Abidin of Terengganu
- Grades: Grand Companion (SSMT); Companion (DSMT); Member (ASM)

Precedence
- Next (higher): Family Order of Terengganu
- Next (lower): Order of the Crown of Terengganu
- Equivalent: Order of Sultan Mizan Zainal Abidin of Terengganu
- -- Ribbon bar of the order

The Most Revered Order of Sultan Mahmud I of Terengganu (Bahasa Melayu: Darjah Kebesaran Sultan Mahmud I Terengganu Yang Amat Terpuji) is a dormant honorific order of the Sultanate of Terengganu

== History ==
It was founded by Sultan Mahmud al-Muktafi Billah Shah on 28 February 1982 and is no more awarded since his death in 1998. It has been superseded by the Order of Sultan Mizan Zainal Abidin of Terengganu.

== Classes ==
It is awarded in three classes:

1. Grand Companion (Max. 16 recipients) - SSMT
2. Companion (Max. 32 recipients) - DSMT
3. Member (Max. 60 recipients) - ASM

Ribbon pattern of the ranks
S.S.M.T.	D.S.M.T.	A.M.T.

== Recipients ==
- Mahmud of Terengganu
- Mizan Zainal Abidin of Terengganu
- Sirajuddin of Perlis
- Tengku Intan Zaharah
- Sultanah Nur Zahirah
- Mahathir Mohamad
- Wan Mokhtar Wan Ahmad
- Ahmad Sarji Abdul Hamid
- Vincent Tan
- Abdul Hadi Awang
- Abdul Hamid Omar
