= Order of Sultan Mizan Zainal Abidin of Terengganu =

Honorific order of the Sultanate of Terengganu

Order of Sultan Mizan Zainal Abidin of Terengganu Darjah Kebesaran Sultan Mizan Zainal Abidin Terengganu Yang Amat Terpilih

Awarded by Sultan of Terengganu
- Type: Order
- Status: Currently constituted
- Sovereign: Mizan Zainal Abidin of Terengganu
- Grades: Grand Principal (SUMZ); Grand Companion (SSMZ); Companion (DSMZ); Officer (SMZ); Member (AMZ)

Precedence
- Next (higher): Family Order of Terengganu
- Next (lower): Order of the Crown of Terengganu
- Equivalent: Order of Sultan Mahmud I of Terengganu (dormant)

The Most Select Order of Sultan Mizan Zainal Abidin of Terengganu (Bahasa Melayu: Darjah Kebesaran Sultan Mizan Zainal Abidin Terengganu Yang Amat Terpilih) is an honorific order of the Sultanate of Terengganu

== History ==
It was founded by Sultan Mizan Zainal Abidin of Terengganu on 6 July 2001.

== Classes ==
It is awarded in a supreme class:

- Grand Principal - SUMZ
- Grand Companion - SSMZ
- Companion - DSMZ
- Officer - SMZ
- Member - AMZ

Ribbon pattern of the ranks
S.U.M.Z.	S.S.M.Z.	D.S.M.Z.	S.M.Z. - A.M.Z.

== Recipients ==
- Mizan Zainal Abidin of Terengganu
