= Order of the Royal Family of Malaysia =

Malaysian federal award

Order of the Royal Family of Malaysia Darjah Yang Maha Utama Kerabat Diraja Malaysia
- The singular class of the Order in display

Awarded by the King of Malaysia
- Type: State Order
- Established: 18 April 1966
- Country: Malaysia
- Ribbon: Red
- Eligibility: King of Malaysia only
- Awarded for: Installation as the Yang di-Pertuan Agong (King)
- Status: Currently constituted
- Sovereign: Sultan Ibrahim, King of Malaysia
- Grades: Grand Royal Principal
- Post-nominals: D.K.M.

Statistics
- Last induction: 2024
- Total inductees: 14 Members

Precedence
- Next (higher): Grand Knight of Valour
- Next (lower): Order of the Crown of the Realm
- Ribbon bar of the Order

The Most Excellent Order of the Royal Family of Malaysia (Malay: Darjah Yang Maha Utama Kerabat Diraja Malaysia) is a Malaysian federal award conferred to the Malay rulers who were appointed as the Yang di-Pertuan Agong of Malaysia. It only has one rank.

This award is limited to 10 living recipients only at any time. The award was instituted on 18 April 1966 and gazetted on 30 June 1966. The last award was granted in 2024. It does not carry any title.

== Insignia ==
The D.K.M. comprises a collar, a star and a badge.

The collar is made of gold-plated silver. The gold star is in a radial form with an embossed fern motive.

The sash is made from red silk and the end is tied with a ribbon. The badge is also in a radial form and surmounted by a hibiscus. It suspends from the Malaysian Royal Crown.

The sash is worn from the left shoulder to the right hip.

== Grand Royal Principal ==
Official source

=== D.K.M. ===
The grand royal principals do not receive any title.

- 1965: Ismail Nasiruddin of Terengganu
- 1966: Putra of Perlis - after reign
- 1970: Abdul Halim of Kedah
- 1975: Yahya Petra of Kelantan
- 1980: Ahmad Shah of Pahang
- 1984: Iskandar of Johor
- 1989: Azlan Shah of Perak
- 1994: Ja'afar of Negeri Sembilan
- 1999: Salahuddin of Selangor
- 2002: Sirajuddin of Perlis
- 2007: Mizan Zainal Abidin of Terengganu
- 2017: Muhammad V of Kelantan
- 2019: Abdullah of Pahang
- 2024: Ibrahim Iskandar of Johor

=== Currently living recipients ===
- Sirajuddin of Perlis
- Mizan Zainal Abidin of Terengganu
- Muhammad V of Kelantan
- Abdullah of Pahang
- Ibrahim Iskandar of Johor
