= Omar Riayat Shah of Terengganu =

Sultan of Terengganu (r. 1831, 1839–1876)

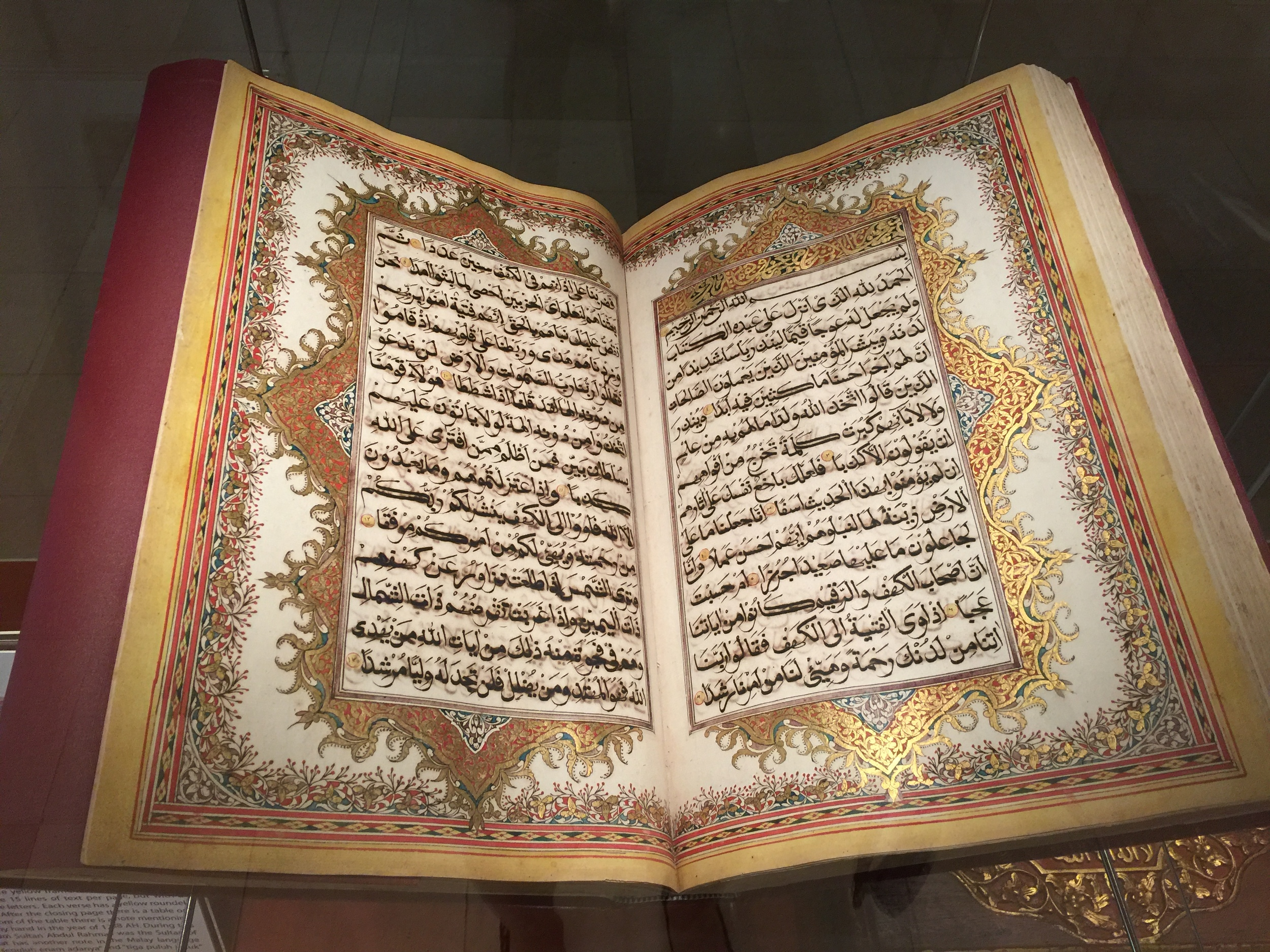
Central illumination of the Royal Terengganu Quran copied in 1871, during the reign of Sultan Omar . Islamic Arts Museum Malaysia

Sultan Omar ibni Almarhum Sultan Ahmad (Jawi: سلطان عمر ابن المرحوم سلطان أحمد ), also known as Baginda Omar, was both the 6th and 9th sultan of Terengganu, having ascended to the throne twice, first in 1831 and again in 1839 and reigned until 1876. Baginda means "the Fortunate" but in its actual use in Malay history it is better translated as "the Conqueror".

Baginda Omar was born in 1806. He first ascended in 1831 to become the joint Sultan of Terengganu with Sultan Mansur Shah II. This joint rule would last less than one year before he was overthrown by Mansur Shah II. In 1833, he was banished to Daik in the Riau Islands by Mansur II.

He again rose to power in 1839 after seizing a small force by overthrowing his cousin Sultan Muhammad II of Kelantan. Once in control of Terengganu, he improved trade and governance in his region. He supported Mahmud Muzaffar Shah in his attempt to take control of Pahang.

During his reign, Terengganu became a vassal state of the Thai Rattanakosin Kingdom (then under the reign of King Mongkut), and sent tribute every year called bunga mas. He also codified his sultanate's religious law through appointments of Arab-descent imams from Riau; Hugh Clifford described this effect towards members of Terengganuan society interviewed decades since his reign as "the most zealous Muhammedans in the Peninsula".

The Istana Hijau, Terengganu's royal palace, was constructed during his reign on 10 March 1870. The palace was burnt down in a fire and was later replaced by the Istana Maziah.

Omar Riayat Shah of Terengganu Bendahara dynasty Born: 1806 Died: 1876
Regnal titles
Preceded by Abdul Rahman	Sultan of Terengganu; 1831	Succeeded by Mansur Shah II
Preceded by Muhammad Shah I	Sultan of Terengganu; 1839–1876	Succeeded by Mahmud Shah
