= Tengku Tengah Zaharah Mosque =

Mosque in Kuala Terengganu, Terengganu, Malaysia

- Masjid Tengku Tengah Zaharah
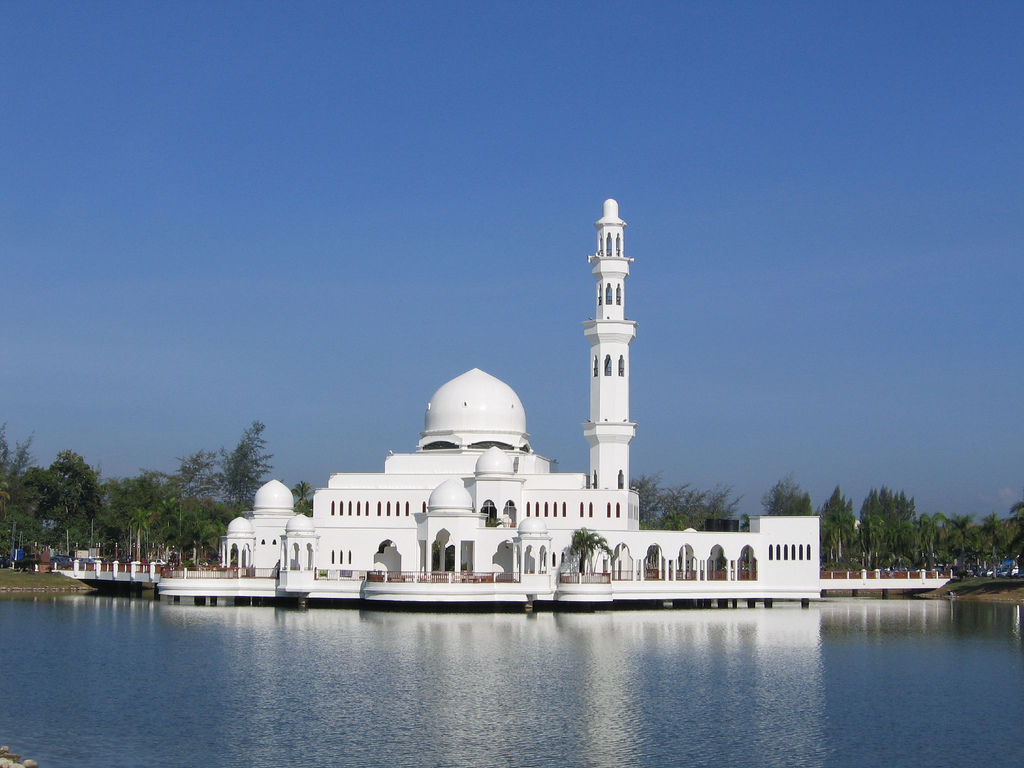

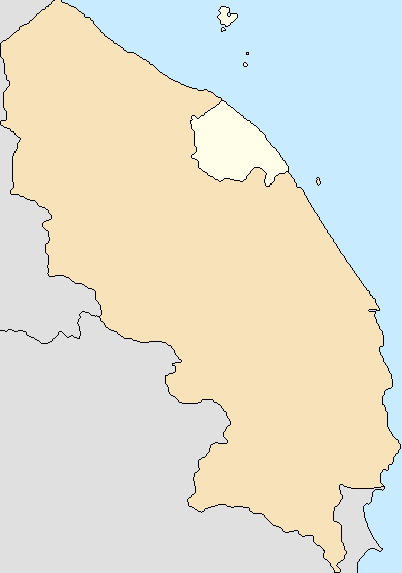
- Location within Kuala Terengganu

Religion
- Affiliation: Islam
- Branch/tradition: Sunni

Location
- Location: Kuala Terengganu, Terengganu, Malaysia
- Interactive map of Tengku Tengah Zaharah Mosque
- Coordinates: 5.2838°N 103.1706°E

Architecture
- Type: mosque
- Groundbreaking: 1993
- Completed: 1995
- Minaret: 1

The Tengku Tengah Zaharah Mosque or the Floating Mosque is the first real floating mosque in Malaysia. It is situated in Kuala Ibai Lagoon near the estuary of Kuala Ibai River, 4 km from Kuala Terengganu Town. Construction began in 1993 and finished in 1995. The mosque was officially opened in July 1995 by Sultan Mahmud Al-Muktafi Billah Shah, the late Sultan of Terengganu. The mosque combines modern and Moorish architecture; incorporating the use of marble, ceramics, mosaic works and bomanite paving. The white structure of the mosque covers an area of roughly 5 acres and can accommodate up to 2,000 worshippers at a time.

== See also ==
- List of mosques in Asia
- Kuala Terengganu
- Islamic Heritage Park
- Islam in Malaysia
