= Al-Muktafi Billah Shah Mosque =

Mosque in Kuala Terengganu, Terengganu, Malaysia

- Masjid Al-Muktafi Billah Shah
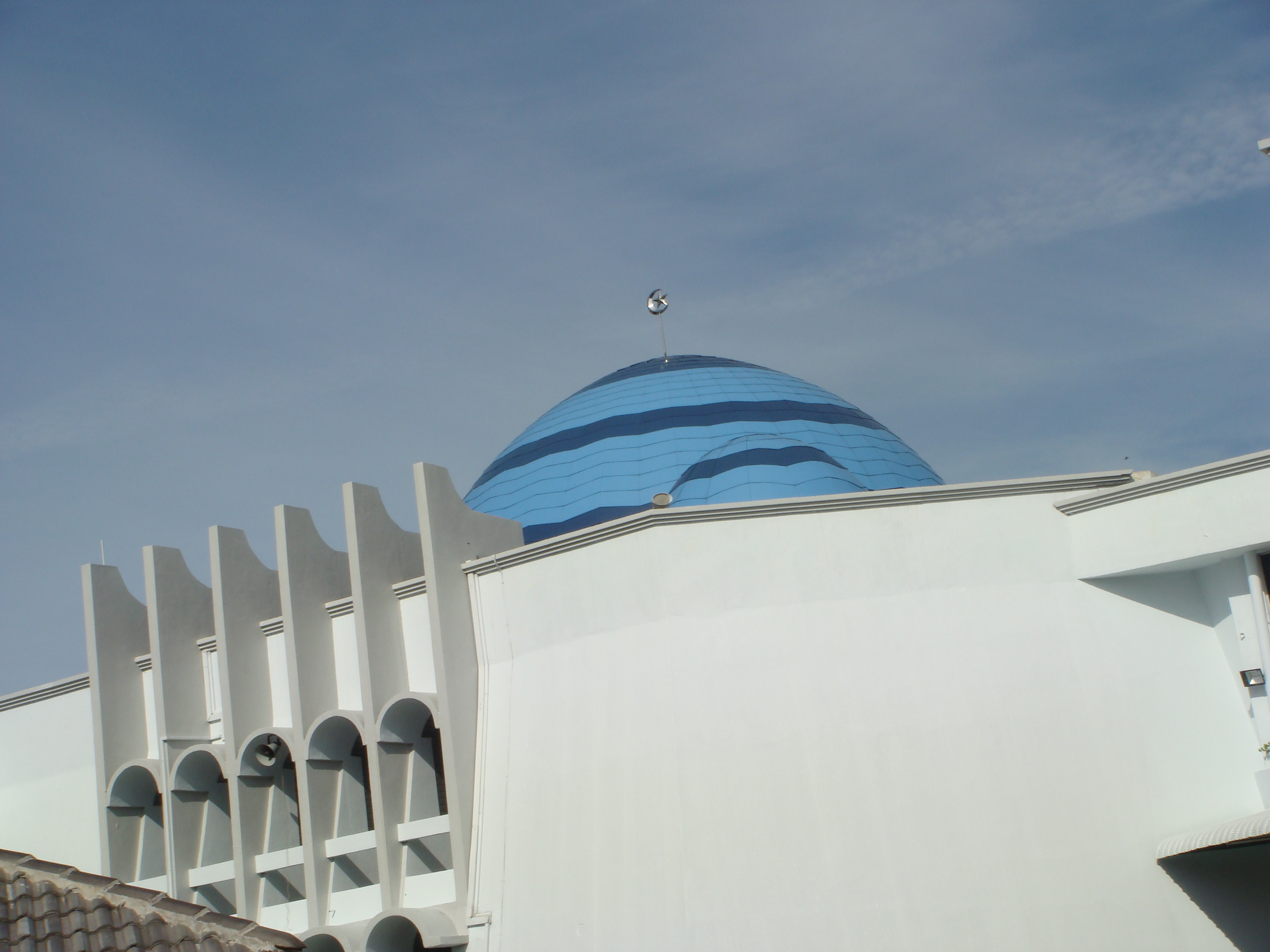

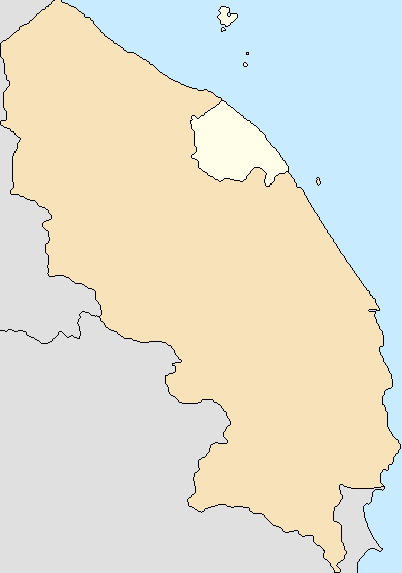
- Location within Kuala Terengganu

Religion
- Affiliation: Islam
- Branch/tradition: Sunni

Location
- Location: Kuala Terengganu, Terengganu, Malaysia
- Interactive map of Al-Muktafi Billah Shah Mosque
- Coordinates: 5°19′40.3″N 103°08′51.7″E

Architecture
- Type: mosque
- Minaret: 1

The Al-Muktafi Billah Shah Mosque (Malay: Masjid Al-Muktafi Billah Shah or Masjid Ladang) is the modern royal mosque of Terengganu, Malaysia. It is located at Kampung Ladang, Kuala Terengganu. Construction of the mosque began in 1981 and the mosque was completed in 1984. The mosque was officially opened in September 1984 by the late Sultan of Terengganu Almarhum Sultan Mahmud Al-Muktafi Billah Shah. The new Royal Mausoleum is a short distance from the mosque.

== Terengganu Royal Mausoleum ==
=== Sultan ===
- Sultan Mahmud Al-Muktafi Billah Shah ibni Almarhum Sultan Ismail Nasiruddin Shah (died 14 May 1998)

=== Royal consorts ===
- Tengku Hajah Bariah binti Almarhum Sultan Hisamuddin Alam Shah Al-Haj - (Tengku Ampuan Besar) (died 21 March 2011)
- Fatimah @ Sharifah Nong Alsagoff binti Abdillah - (Tengku Besar) (died 3 August 2023)

=== Royal family members ===
- Tengku Amira Zahara Farrah Quraishiyah Puteri binti Sultan Mahmud al-Muktafi Billah Shah (died 25 February 2001)
- Tengku Norhana Fatihah Putri binti Sultan Mahmud al-Muktafi Billah Shah (died 04 July 2023)

== See also ==
- Islam in Malaysia
- GoogleMaps StreetView of Masjid Al-Muktafi Billah Shah, Kuala Terengganu.
