= Mahmud of Terengganu =

Sultan of Terengganu (r. 1979–1998)

Mahmud محمود
- Al-Muktafi Billah (He who God is Content with); Sultan of Terengganu
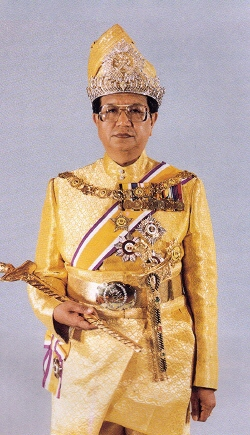
- Almarhum Sultan Mahmud Al-Muktafi Billah Shah ibni Almarhum Sultan Ismail Nasiruddin Shah

Sultan of Terengganu
- Reign: 21 September 1979 – 14 May 1998
- Coronation: 21 March 1981
- Predecessor: Sultan Ismail Nasiruddin Shah
- Successor: Sultan Mizan Zainal Abidin
- Born: 29 April 1930; Kuala Terengganu, Terengganu, Unfederated Malay States
- Died: 14 May 1998 (aged 68); Mount Elizabeth Hospital, Newton, Central Area, Singapore
- Burial: 15 May 1998; Royal Mausoleum, Masjid Al-Muktafi Billah Shah
- Spouses: Tengku Ampuan Bariah binti Al-Marhum Sultan Hisamuddin Alam Shah (m. 1951) Tengku Besar Terengganu Fatimah Sharifah Nong Alsagoff binti Abdillah (m. 1959) Cik Khadijah (divorced)
- Issue: Tengku Amira Zaharah Farah Quraishiyah; Tengku Mizan Zainal Abidin; Tengku Norhana Fatihah Putri; Tengku Rahimah Putri; Tengku Mustaffa Kamel; Tengku Baderul Zaman; Tengku Badrul Hisham Baharuddin
- House: Bendahara dynasty
- Father: Sultan Ismail Nasiruddin Shah
- Mother: Tengku Tengah Zaharah
- Religion: Sunni Islam

Sultan Mahmud Al-Muktafi Billah Shah ibni Almarhum Sultan Ismail Nasiruddin Shah KStJ (Jawi: سلطان محمود المكتفي بالله شاه ابن المرحوم سلطان إسماعيل ناصر الدين شاه);(29 April 1930 – 14 May 1998) was the 17th sultan of Terengganu, reigning from 21 September 1979 to 14 May 1998.

== Early life ==
Sultan Mahmud was born on 29 April 1930 in Kuala Terengganu. Mahmud's father, Sultan Ismail Nasiruddin died in 1979. He was crowned Sultan of Terengganu in 1981 and Tengku Ampuan Bariah became Tengku Ampuan Besar of Terengganu.

Sultan Mahmud was the colonel for the Royal Armoured Corps of the Malaysian Army from 1979 to 1998.

He was a close friend of his advisor Tan Sri Wan Mokhtar Ahmad, the Menteri Besar (chief minister) of Terengganu from 1974 to 1999. His main goal was to make Terengganu a developed state. Major state projects and developments during his reign included Petronas Petroleum Complex in Kerteh, Sultan Ismail Power Station at Paka, the largest power station in Malaysia, Kenyir Dam, Sultan Mahmud Bridge, the bridge linking Kuala Terengganu to Pulau Duyong and Kuala Nerus, Wisma Darul Iman and the Tengku Tengah Zaharah Mosque (Floating Mosque).

He performed the hajj pilgrimage with his brother-in-law, Sultan Salahuddin of Selangor in 1984.

== Personal life ==
He was married polygamously to both Tengku Besar Terengganu Fatimah Sharifah Nong Alsagoff binti Abdillah (1938–2023) and Tengku Ampuan Bariah (1933–2011), sister of Sultan Salahuddin of Selangor.

His wives and children were:

- Tengku Bariah bint Sultan Hisamuddin Alam Shah, a princess of Opu Daeng Chelak dynasty of Selangor, sometime Tengku Puan Muda (1951–1979) and Tengku Ampuan Besar (1979–1998), eventually Tengku Ampuan of Terengganu
- Tengku Besar Terengganu Fatimah Sharifah Nong Alsagoff bint Abdillah
  - Tengku Amira Zahara Farah Qurashiyah, the Tengku Kemala Putri
  - Sultan Mizan Zainal Abidin, Sultan of Terengganu
  - Tengku Nur Rohana Fathia Putri
  - Tengku Rahimah Putri
  - Tengku Mustaffa Kamel, the Tengku Sri Bendahara Raja
  - Tengku Baderul Zaman, the Tengku Sri Panglima Raja
- Cik Khadijah
  - Tengku Badrul Hisham, the Tengku Sri Temenggong Raja

== Death ==
On 14 May 1998, he died in Mount Elizabeth Hospital, Singapore and was succeeded by his son Sultan Mizan Zainal Abidin. His body was then laid to rest in the new Royal Mausoleum near Al-Muktafi Billah Shah Mosque in Kuala Terengganu. He was the first sultan of Terengganu to be buried there.

== Honours ==
=== Honours of Terengganu ===
- Founding Grand Master and Member of the Most Exalted Supreme Royal Family Order of Terengganu (DKT, 10 March 1981)
- Grand Master (21 September 1979 – 15 May 1998) and First Class of the Most Distinguished Family Order of Terengganu (DK I, 26 June 1964)
- Founding Grand Master and Member Grand Companion of the Most Revered Order of Sultan Mahmud I of Terengganu (SSMT, 28 February 1982)
- Grand Master (21 September 1979 – 15 May 1998) and Knight Grand Commander of the Most Distinguished Order of the Crown of Terengganu (SPMT, 26 June 1977)

=== Honours of Malaysia ===
- Malaysia
  - Recipient of Most Exalted Order of the Crown of the Realm (DMN, 1981)
- Johor
  - First Class of the Most Esteemed Royal Family Order of Johor (DK I, 27 April 1982)
- Kedah
  - Member of the Most Illustrious Royal Family Order of Kedah (DK, 20 January 1985)
- Kelantan
  - Member of the Most Esteemed Royal Family Order of Kelantan (DK, 30 March 1985)
- Negeri Sembilan
  - Member of the Most Illustrious Royal Family Order of Negeri Sembilan (DKNS, 19 July 1988)
- Pahang
  - Member 1st class of the Most Esteemed Family Order of the Crown of Indra of Pahang (DK I, 24 October 1981)
- Perak
  - Member of the Most Esteemed Royal Family Order of Perak (DK, 1982)
  - Grand Knight of the Most Illustrious Order of Cura Si Manja Kini (SPCM, 1977)
- Perlis
  - Member of the Most Esteemed Perlis Family Order of the Gallant Prince Syed Putra Jamalullail (DK, 27 October 1984)
- Selangor
  - Second class of the Royal Family Order of Selangor (DK II) (8 March 1978)
- Sarawak
  - Knight Grand Commander of the Order of the Star of Hornbill Sarawak (DP, 12 March 1982)

=== Foreign Honours ===
- Brunei
  - Recipient of the Royal Family Order of the Crown of Brunei (DKMB)
- United Kingdom
  - Knight of Justice or Grace of the Order of the Hospital of St. John of Jerusalem (KStJ, 20 March 1990)
  - Recipient of the Queen Elizabeth II Coronation Medal (2 June 1953)

== Legacy ==
=== Educational institutions ===
- Sekolah Menengah Sains Sultan Mahmud (SESMA) at Wakaf Tembusu, Kuala Terengganu

=== Buildings, Bridges and Roads ===
- Sultan Mahmud Al-Muktafi Billah Shah Mosque at Bandar Al-Muktafi Billah Shah
- Al-Muktafi Billah Shah Mosque at Kuala Terengganu
- Sultan Mahmud Bridge at Jalan Tengku Mizan on Federal Route 65 at Kuala Terengganu
- Jalan Sultan Mahmud on Federal Route 174 at Kuala Terengganu
- Sultan Mahmud Airport at Seberang Takir, Kuala Terengganu
- Sultan Mahmud Power Station, Kenyir Dam

=== Others ===
- Bandar Al-Muktafi Billah Shah

Mahmud of Terengganu Bendahara Dynasty Born: 1930 Died: 1998
Regnal titles
Preceded by Sultan Ismail Nasiruddin Shah	Sultan of Terengganu; 1979-1998	Succeeded by Sultan Mizan Zainal Abidin
