= Ismail Nasiruddin of Terengganu =

King of Malaysia from 1965 to 1970

Ismail Nasiruddin إسماعيل ناصرالدين
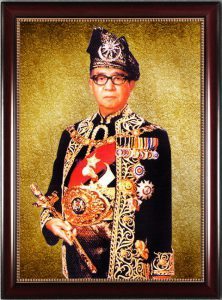
- Official portrait, c. 1965–1970

King of Malaysia
- Reign: 21 September 1965 – 20 September 1970
- Installation: 11 April 1966
- Predecessor: Putra
- Successor: Abdul Halim

Sultan of Terengganu
- Reign: 16 December 1945 – 20 September 1979
- Coronation: 6 June 1949
- Predecessor: Ali Shah
- Successor: Mahmud Al-Muktafi Billah
- Born: 24 January 1907; Kuala Terengganu, Terengganu, Siam
- Died: 20 September 1979 (aged 72); Istana Badariah, Padang Seri Negara, Mukim Batu Burok, Kuala Terengganu, Terengganu, Malaysia
- Burial: 21 September 1979; Abidin Mosque, Kuala Terengganu, Terengganu, Malaysia
- Spouse: Che Wan Aminah Binti Wan Cik; Tengku Tengah Zaharah Binti Tengku Umar Tengku Intan Zaharah (m. 1944) Che Jarah Binti Abdullah
- Issue: Tengku Wuk Fatima Sabariah; Tengku Zaharah Putri; Sultan Mahmud Al-Muktafi Billah Shah; Tengku Abdul Malik Shah; Tengku Ibrahim Shah; Tengku Abdullah Sulaiman Shah; Tengku Zaleha Putri; Tengku Noor Azia Iman Putri; Tengku Zainah Putri; Tengku Maria Norshiah Putri; Tengku Ruqiya; Tengku Ramlah Azizah Putri
Names
- Tengku Ismail Nasirudddin Shah ibni Sultan Zainal Abidin III
Regnal name
- Sultan Ismail Nasiruddin Shah ibni Almarhum Sultan Haji Zainal Abidin III Mu’azzam Shah (as Sultan); Tuanku Ismail Nasiruddin Shah ibni Almarhum Sultan Haji Zainal Abidin III Mu’azzam Shah (as Yang di-Pertuan Agong)
- House: House of Bendahara
- Father: Sultan Haji Zainal Abidin III Mu’azzam Shah ibni Almarhum Sultan Ahmad
- Mother: Cik Maimunah Binti Abdullah
- Religion: Sunni Islam

Ismail Nasiruddin Shah ibni Almarhum Sultan Haji Zainal Abidin III Mu’azzam Shah KCMG (Jawi: سلطان سر إسماعيل ناصرالدين شاه ابن المرحوم سلطان حاجي زين العابدين ٣ معظم شاه; 24 January 1907 – 20 September 1979) was the Sultan of Terengganu from 1945 until his death in 1979, and the fourth Yang di-Pertuan Agong (King of Malaysia), from 1965 to 1970.

== Early career ==
The date of his birth has been given as either 16 March 1906 or 24 January 1907, the latter being the one more often used. Born in Kuala Terengganu, he was the fifth, and third surviving, son of Sultan Zainal Abidin III of Terengganu (r. 1881–1918). His mother was a Thai Muslim convert, Cik Maimuna binti Abdullah, who died in 1918.

Educated at the Kuala Terengganu Malay School, he then went to the Malay College. In 1929, he entered the Terengganu administrative service. In 1934, he was appointed Assistant Collector of Land Revenue in Kuala Terengganu.

In 1935, he became aide-de-camp to his elder half brother Sultan Sulaiman Badrul Alam Shah, accompanying him to the coronation of King George VI on 12 May 1937. In 1939, he became Registrar of the High Court and the Court of Appeal. He also served as the Land Court Registrar. In 1940, he was appointed a minister of the Terengganu state cabinet, having been made Tengku Sri Paduka Raja. In 1941, he became First Class Magistrate and was promoted Terengganu State Secretary on 15 November 1941.

== Succession dispute ==
Sultan Sulaiman Badrul Alam Shah of Terengganu died on 25 September 1942 of blood poisoning. The Japanese Military Administration, which occupied Malaya at that time, proclaimed his son as the fifteenth Sultan of Terengganu styled as Sultan Ali Shah. On 18 October 1943, the Thai government under Prime Minister Plaek Phibunsongkhram took over the administration of Terengganu from the Japanese and continued to recognise Sultan Ali Shah.

When the British returned after the end of World War II, they declined to recognise Sultan Ali Shah. Allegedly, Ali Shah was in too much debt and had been too close to the Japanese during their occupation. According to Ali Shah, the British Military Administration wanted him removed for his refusal to sign the Malayan Union treaty.

The British Military Administration also disapproved of Ali Shah's character, where he was said to have repudiated his official consort, Tengku Seri Nila Utama Pahang (the daughter of Sultan Abu Bakar of Pahang) and had a second marriage with a former prostitute.

On 5 November 1945 the Terengganu State Council of thirteen members announced the dismissal of Sultan Ali Shah and the appointment of Tengku Ismail as the fifteenth Sultan of Terengganu. Tengku Ismail became known as Sultan Ismail Nasiruddin Shah and was installed on 6 June 1949 at the Istana Maziah, Kuala Terengganu.

Ali Shah continued to dispute his dismissal until his death on 17 May 1996.

== Deputy Yang di-Pertuan Agong ==
Sultan Ismail served as Deputy Yang di-Pertuan Agong from 21 September 1960 to 20 September 1965.

== Yang di-Pertuan Agong ==
Sultan Ismail was elected the fourth Yang di-Pertuan Agong (King of Malaysia) and served in that office from 21 September 1965 to 20 September 1970.

Sultan Ismail's reign was at a time when Malaysia began to be active internationally, having secured a more solid foundation as a Federation of Malay States, Sabah and Sarawak. Many visits by world leaders were made including US President Lyndon B. Johnson, West German President Heinrich Lübke, King Faisal of Saudi Arabia, the Shah of Iran, Emperor Haile Selassie of Ethiopia, Ferdinand Marcos of the Philippines, General Ne Win of Burma and Prime Minister Nguyễn Cao Kỳ of South Vietnam. The security of the country was more secure during his reign as the Indonesia–Malaysia confrontation had ended and the Philippines sought normal relations (after its claim of Sabah) with Malaysia. Due to health reasons he wanted to resign as Yang di-Pertuan Agong in 1969, but was persuaded by Prime Minister Tunku Abdul Rahman not to do so as the next Yang di-Pertuan Agong would be Tunku Abdul Rahman's nephew (Tuanku Abdul Halim of Kedah) and the Tunku felt it was not right for him to continue in office during that time. In his farewell speech at the end of his and Sultan Ismail's term as Yang Di Pertuan Agong, Tunku Abdul Rahman declared that the event signified "the end of the first chapter of Malaysia's history".

Sultan Ismail was reigning as Yang di-Pertuan Agong when the May 13 incident sparked race riots in Kuala Lumpur and parliament was suspended. Despite this event, Tunku Abdul Rahman described Sultan Ismail's reign as "a most eventful and glorious one". Sultan Ismail launched the Rukun Negara, the Malaysian declaration of national philosophy on 31 August 1970.

== Death and funeral ==
Sultan Ismail died at the Istana Badariah, Padang Seri Negara, Mukim Batu Burok, Kuala Terengganu on 20 September 1979 after suffering from two heart attacks and was buried a day later at the Abidin Mosque, Royal Mausoleum, Kuala Terengganu. He was succeeded by Sultan Mahmud Al-Muktafi Billah Shah, his eldest son. He died exactly nine years later after his tenure as Yang di Pertuan Agong ended on 20 September 1970.

== Family and personal life ==
Sultan Ismail married four times:

1. Che Wan Aminah binti Che Wan Chik, by whom he had two daughters
2. in 1928 to Tengku Tengah Zaharah binti Tengku Setia Raja Pahang Tengku Umar bin Sultan Ahmad Pahang (1912–1977; divorced) by whom he had eight children including his successor as sultan of Terengganu, Sultan Mahmud
3. in 1944 to Tengku Intan Zaharah binti Tengku Setia Raja Terengganu Tengku Hitam Umar (1928-2015) sometime Tengku Ampuan Besar of Terengganu, Raja Permaisuri Agong and eventually made Tengku Ampuan Tua of Terengganu
4. Che Jarah binti Abdullah, by whom he had one daughter

Ismail was an amateur photographer. His photographic works date from 1923 to 1979. A monograph of his life as photographer was written and published in August 2013 by his grandson and heir of his photograph archives, Raja Mohd Zainol Ihsan Shah.

== Awards and recognitions ==
=== National and Sultanal Honours ===
- Terengganu
  - Founding Grand Master of the Family Order of Terengganu
  - Founding Grand Master of the Order of the Crown of Terengganu
- Malaysia (as Yang di-Pertuan Agong)
  - Founder and Recipient of Order of the Royal House of Malaysia (born 18 April 1966)
  - Grand Master (1965–1970) of the Order of the Crown of the Realm
  - Founding Grand Master (15 April 1966 – 1970) of the Order of Loyalty to the Crown of Malaysia
  - Grand Master (1965-1970) of the Order of the Royal Household of Malaysia
- Malaya
  - Recipient of the Order of the Crown of the Realm (DMN) (1958)
- Malaysia
  - Recipient of the Malaysian Commemorative Medal (Gold) (PPM) (1965)
- Kelantan
  - Recipient of the Royal Family Order or Star of Yunus (DK)
- Pahang
  - Member 1st class of the Family Order of the Crown of Indra of Pahang (DK I)
- Perak
  - Recipient of the Royal Family Order of Perak (DK) (1976)
- Selangor
  - First Class of the Royal Family Order of Selangor (DK I) (1962)

=== Foreign Honours ===
- United Kingdom
  - Recipient of the King George V Silver Jubilee Medal (1935)
  - Recipient of the King George VI Coronation Medal (1937)
  - Companion of the Order of St Michael and St George (CMG) (1948)
  - Honorary Knight Commander of the Order of St Michael and St George (KCMG) - Sir (1951)
  - Recipient of the Queen Elizabeth II Coronation Medal (1953)
- Philippines
  - Grand Collar (Raja) of the Order of Sikatuna (GCS, 9 January 1968)
- West Germany
  - Grand Cross Special Class of the Bundesverdienstkreuz (1966)
- South Korea
  - Recipient of the Grand Order of Mugunghwa (1966)
- Japan
  - Collar of the Order of the Chrysanthemum (1968)
- Iran
  - Collar of the Order of Pahlavi (1968)
- Ethiopia
  - Grand Cordon with Collar of the Order of the Queen of Sheba (1968)

=== Places named after him ===
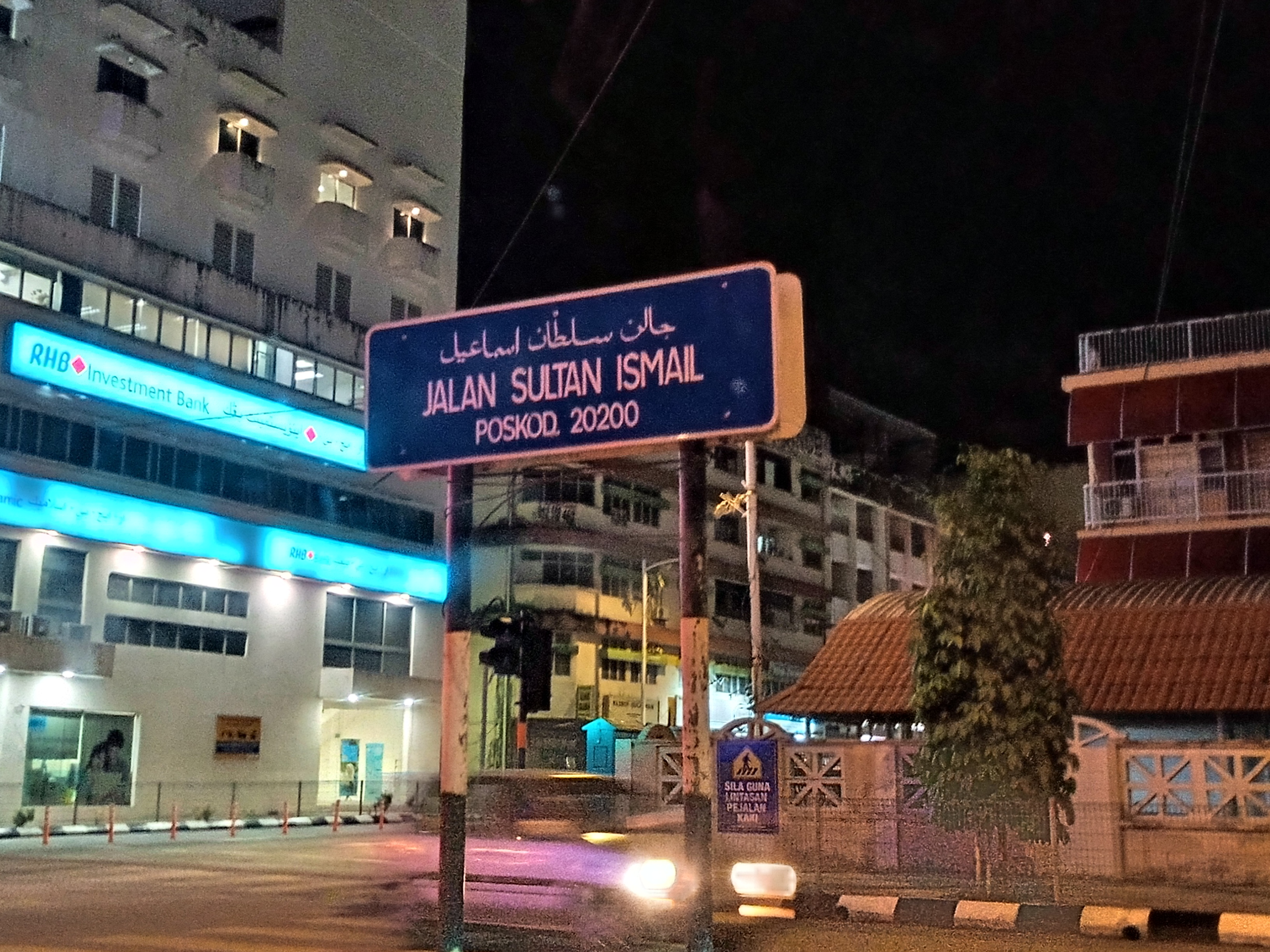
Jalan Sultan Ismail in Terengganu

Several places were named after him, including:

- Jalan Sultan Ismail, formerly known as Treacher Road in Kuala Lumpur
- Sultan Ismail LRT Station in Kuala Lumpur
- Jalan Sultan Ismail in Kuala Terengganu, Terengganu
- Sultan Ismail Nasiruddin Shah Stadium in Kuala Terengganu, Terengganu
- SK Sultan Ismail, a primary school in Kemaman, Terengganu
- SM Agama Sultan Ismail, a secondary school in Dungun, Terengganu
- SMK Sultan Ismail 1, a secondary school in Kemaman, Terengganu
- SMK Sultan Ismail II, a secondary school in Kemaman, Terengganu
- SMK Nasiruddin Shah, a secondary school in Besut, Terengganu
- Sultan Ismail Power Station in Paka, Terengganu

== Notes ==
Regnal titles
Preceded by Tuanku Syed Putra (Raja of Perlis)	Yang di-Pertuan Agong (Supreme King of Malaysia); 21 September 1965 – 20 September 1970	Succeeded by Tuanku Abdul Halim (Sultan of Kedah)
Ismail Nasiruddin of Terengganu Bendahara dynasty Born: 24 January 1907 Died: 20 September 1979
Regnal titles
Preceded by Ali Shah	Sultan of Terengganu; 16 December 1945 – 20 September 1979	Succeeded by Mahmud Al-Muktafi Billah
