= Ali Shah of Terengganu =

Sultan of Terengganu (r. 1942–1945)

Ali علي
- Sultan of Terengganu

Sultan of Terengganu
- Reign: 26 September 1942 – 5 November 1945
- Coronation: 1942
- Predecessor: Sultan Sulaiman Badrul Alam Shah
- Successor: Sultan Ismail Nasiruddin Shah
- Born: 24 January 1914; Kuala Terengganu, Terengganu, Unfederated Malay States
- Died: 17 May 1996 (aged 82); Kuala Terengganu, Terengganu, Malaysia
- House: Bendahara
- Father: Sultan Sulaiman Badrul Alam Shah
- Religion: Sunni Islam

Sultan Ali Shah ibni Almarhum Sultan Sulaiman Badrul Alam Shah (Jawi: سلطان علي شاه ابن المرحوم سلطان سليمان بدر العالم شاه; 24 January 1914 – 17 May 1996) was the fifteenth Sultan of Terengganu. He was the son of the fourteenth sultan, Sulaiman Badrul Alam Shah and the legitimate heir to the throne of Terengganu.

Sultan Sulaiman died on 25 September 1942 of blood poisoning. The Japanese Military Administration, which at that time occupied Malaya, proclaimed Sultan Ali as the Sultan of Terengganu.

On 18 October 1943, the Thai government under Prime Minister Field Marshal Plaek Pibulsonggram took over the administration of Terengganu from the Japanese and continued to recognize Sultan Ali as the legitimate Sultan.

When the British returned after the end of World War II, they declined to recognize Sultan Ali. Allegedly, Sultan Ali was in too much debt and had been too close to the Japanese during their occupation. According to Sultan Ali, the British Military Administration wanted him removed for his refusal to sign the Malayan Union treaty.

The British Military Administration also disapproved of Sultan Ali's character, who was said to have repudiated his official consort Tengku Putri Hajjah ‘Ain ul-Jamal, Tengku Sri Nila Utama of Pahang (the daughter of Sultan Abu Bakar of Pahang) and had a second marriage with a former prostitute.

On 5 November 1945 the Terengganu State Council, which consisted thirteen members, announced the dismissal of Sultan Ali and the appointment of Tengku Ismail as the sixteenth Sultan of Terengganu. Tengku Ismail became known as Sultan Ismail Nasiruddin and was installed on 6 June 1949 at the Istana Maziah, Kuala Terengganu. Sultan Ismail's descendants have ruled Terengganu since.

Sultan Ali continued to dispute his dismissal until his death on 17 May 1996.

Ali Shah of Terengganu Bendahara dynasty Died: 1996
Regnal titles
Preceded by Sulaiman Badrul Alam Shah	Sultan of Terengganu; 1942–1945	Succeeded by Ismail Nasiruddin Shah
