= Sultan of Terengganu =

Head of state of Terengganu, Malaysia

- Sultan Terengganu سلطان ترڠݢانو
- State
- Arms of His Royal Highness the Sultan of Terengganu

Incumbent
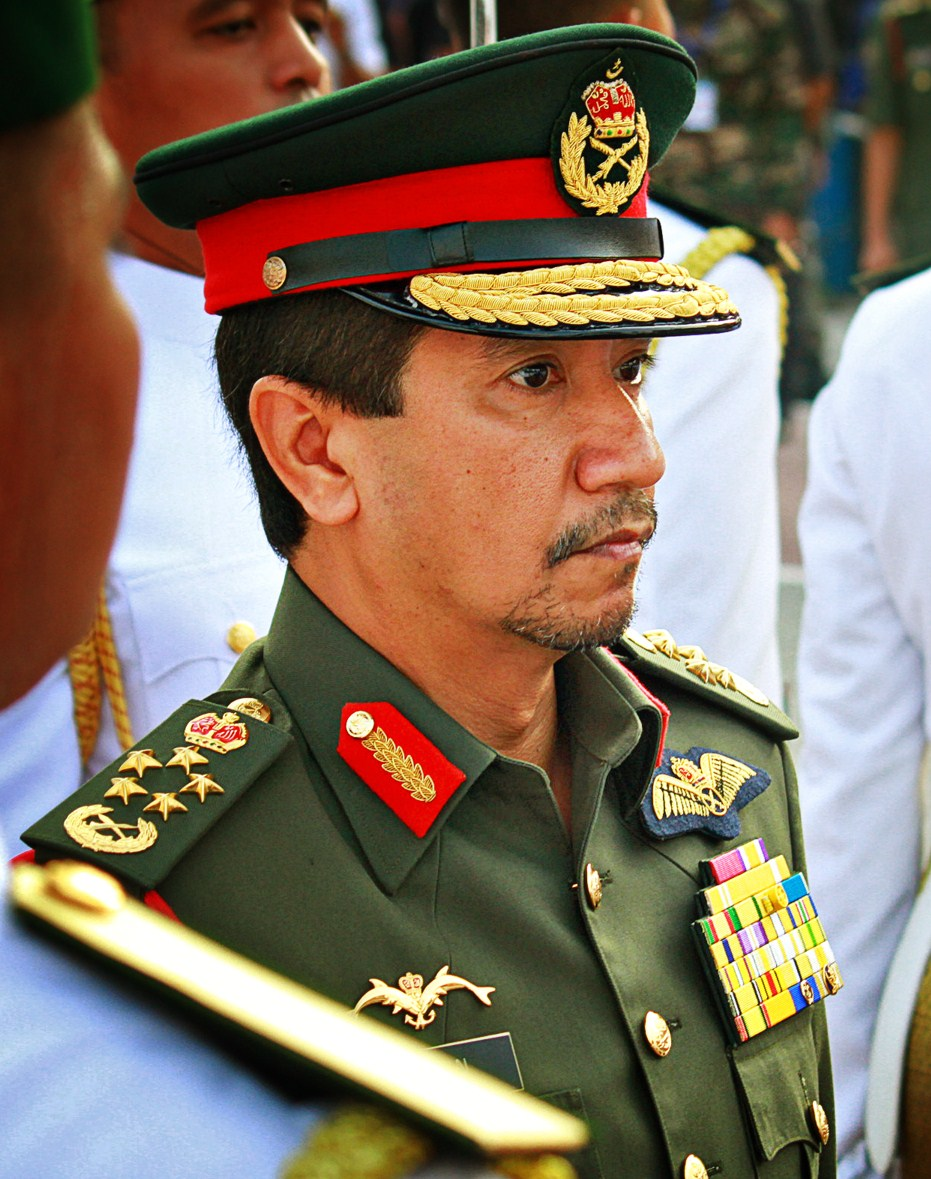
- Al-Wathiqu Billah Sultan Mizan Zainal Abidin, Sultan of Terengganu since 15 May 1998
- Coronation 4 March 1999

Details
- Style: His Royal Highness
- Heir apparent: Tengku Muhammad Ismail
- First monarch: Zainal Abidin I
- Formed: 1722; 304 years ago
- Residences: Istana Syarqiyyah, Kuala Terengganu

The Sultan of Terengganu (Malay: Sultan Terengganu, Jawi: سلطان ترڠݢانو) is the title of the constitutional head of Terengganu state in Malaysia. The current sultan, Mizan Zainal Abidin of Terengganu, is the 18th sultan and 13th Yang di-Pertuan Agong of Malaysia from 2006 to 2011. He is the head of Islam in the state and the source of all titles, honours and dignities in the state.

== History ==
Terengganu emerged as an independent sultanate in 1722 with the installation of the first sultan, Zainal Abidin I. In 1741, Sultan Sulaiman of Johor appointed Sultan Mansur as the ruler of Terengganu. Popular among his people, Sultan Mansur in the mid-18th century forged a strong alliance among the Malays to counter the growing influence of the Bugis. European accounts of that era laud the well-organized governance under his leadership.

In 1871, Terengganu became a vassal state of the Thai Rattanakosin Kingdom, and sent tribute every year called bunga mas. This occurred during the reign of Sultan Omar Riayat Shah, who was remembered as a devout ruler who promoted trade and stable government. Under Thai rule, Terengganu prospered, and was largely left alone by the authorities in Bangkok.

Sultan Zainal Abidin III ascended after the death of his father Sultan Ahmad II in 1881. Under his reign Terengganu became a British protectorate via the Anglo-Siamese Treaty of 1909. In 1911, the Sultan issued Terengganu's first constitution. In 1919, a British advisor was appointed to Sultan Muhammad Shah II, the son of the former sultan. Sultan Sulaiman Badrul Alam Shah was crowned in 1920, his reign saw the growth of Malay nationalism in Terengganu. During the 1920s, growing anti-British sentiment in Terengganu led to uprisings in 1922, 1925 and 1928 which were led by Haji Abdul Rahman Limbong. Sultan Sulaiman Badrul Alam Shah of Terengganu died on 25 September 1942 of blood poisoning. The Japanese Military Administration, which occupied Malaya at that time, proclaimed his son as the 15th Sultan of Terengganu bearing the title Sultan Ali Shah. In 1943, the Thai government under prime minister Field Marshal Plaek Pibulsonggram took over the administration of Terengganu from the Japanese and continued to recognise Sultan Ali Shah.

When the British returned after the end of World War II, they declined to recognise Sultan Ali Shah. Allegedly, Sultan Ali was in too much debt and had been too close to the Japanese during their occupation. According to Sultan Ali, the British Military Administration wanted him removed for his refusal to sign the Malayan Union treaty and they also disapproved of his character.

On 1945, the Terengganu State Council of thirteen members announced the dismissal of Sultan Ali and the appointment of Tengku Ismail as the 16th Sultan of Terengganu. Tengku Ismail became known as Sultan Ismail Nasiruddin Shah and was installed on 6 June 1949 at Istana Maziah, Kuala Terengganu. Sultan Ali continued to dispute his dismissal until his death on 17 May 1996.

Sultan Mahmud al-Muktafi Billah Shah succeeded his father in 1979 and ruled Terengganu until 1998, when it then passed to his son Sultan Mizan Zainal Abidin, who is the current sultan.

== List of sultans ==
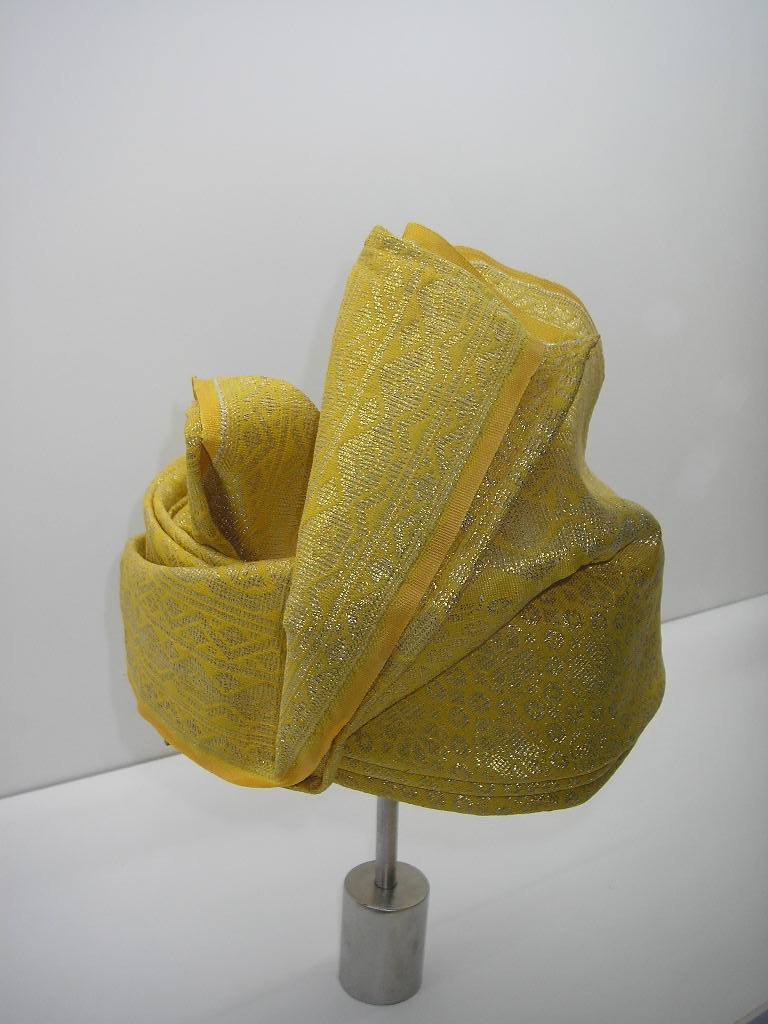
The sultan of Terengganu's headgear (Solek Belalai Gajah). Worn by the sultan, this songket is folded like a leaf bud pointing upwards, resembling an elephant tusk from which it takes its name. Its folded in three layers with its point wounded to the right, signifying the wearer is a royal.

List of sultans of Terengganu
Reign	Sultan	Duration
1722–1741	Zainal Abidin Shah I of Terengganu	19 years
1741–1793	Mansur Riayat Shah I of Terengganu	52 years
1793–1808	Zainal Abidin Shah II of Terengganu	15 years
1808–1830	Ahmad Muazzam Shah I of Terengganu	22 years
1830–1831	Abdul Rahman Shah	1 year
January – April 1831	Dzaudd Riayat Shah	~3 months
1831 (jointly)	Omar Riayat Shah and Mansur Shah II	~1 year (jointly)
1831–1837	Mansur Riayat Shah II of Terengganu	6 years
1837–1839	Muhammad Muazzam Shah I	2 years
1839–1876	Omar Riayat Shah	37 years
1876–1877	Mahmud Mustafa Shah	~1 year
1877–1881	Ahmad Muazzam Shah II	4 years
1881–1918	Zainal Abidin Shah III	37 years
1918–1920	Muhammad Muazzam Shah II	2 years
1920–1942	Sulaiman Badrul Alam Shah	22 years
1942–1945	Ali Bhadrul Hasshik Alam Shah	3 years
1945–1979	Ismail Nasiruddin Shah	34 years
1979–1998	Mahmud al-Muktafi Billah Shah	19 years
1998–present	Mizan Zainal Abidin	ongoing

== Gallery ==
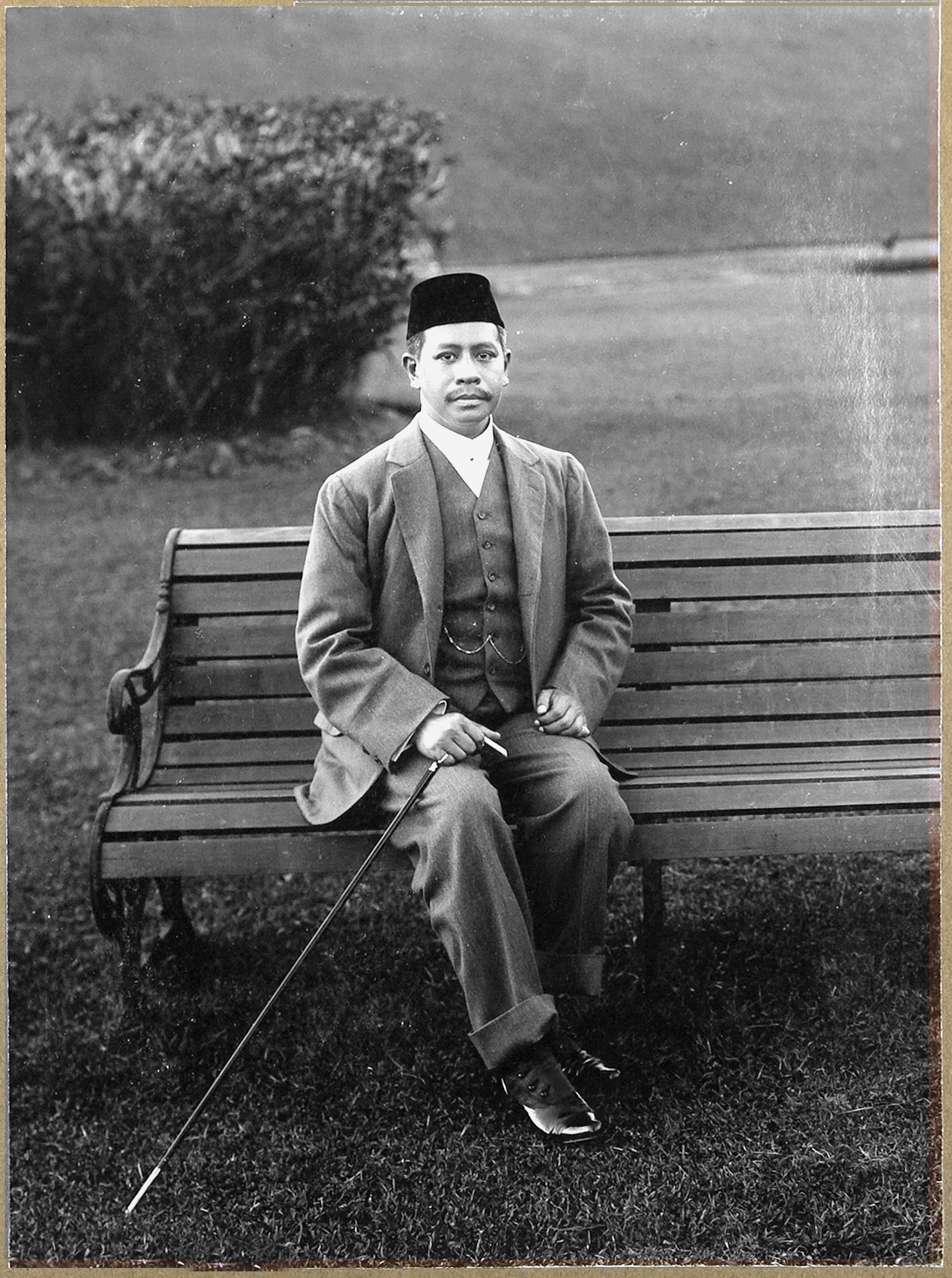
Sultan Zainal Abidin III (reigned 1881–1918), the 12th sultan of Terengganu

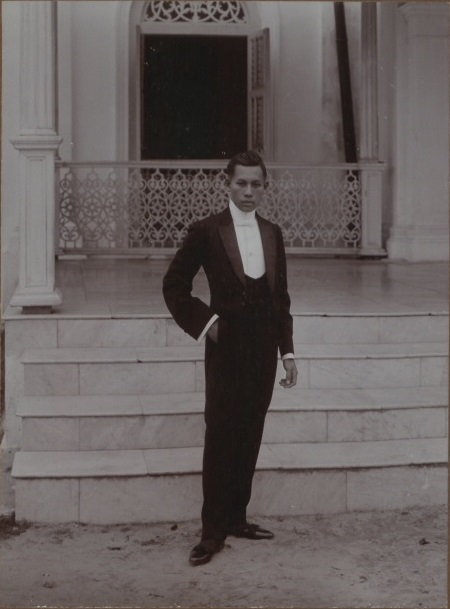
Sultan Muhammad Shah II (reigned 1918–1920), the 13th sultan of Terengganu, then a raja muda (crown prince) in 1909

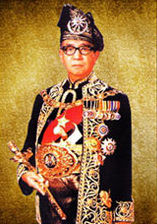
Ismail Nasiruddin of Terengganu (reigned 1965–1970), the 16th sultan

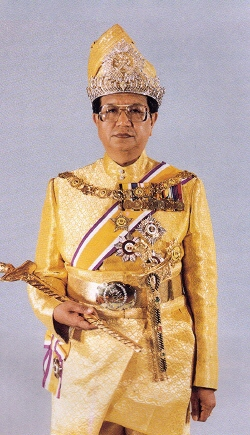
Mahmud of Terengganu (reigned 1979–1998), the 17th sultan and the previous sultan to the current one

== See also ==
- Family tree of Terengganu monarchs
- Family tree of Malaysian monarchs
- List of Sunni Muslim dynasties
