= Istana Maziah =

Palace in Kuala Terengganu, Terengganu, Malaysia

Coordinates: 5°20′N 103°08′E

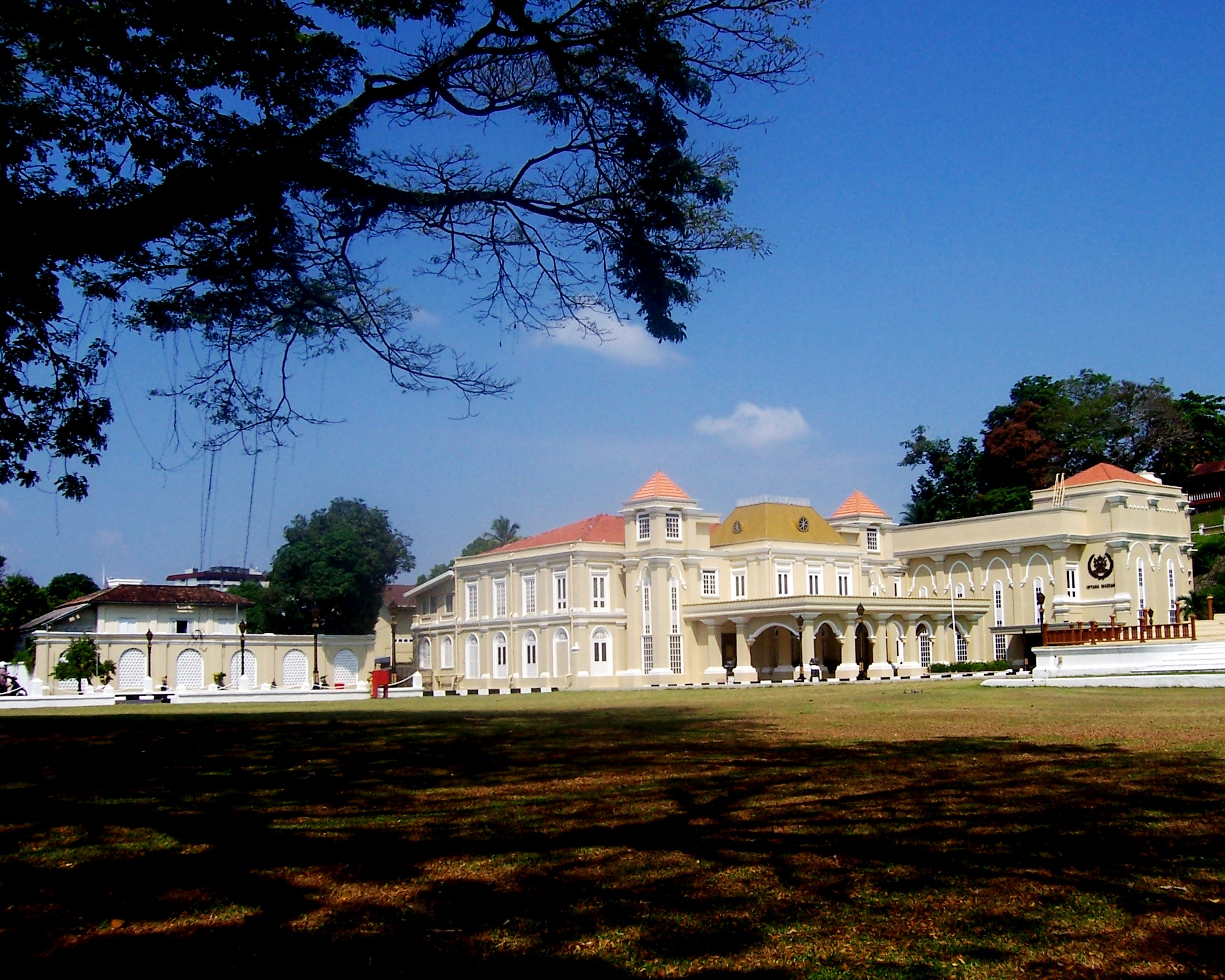
- Maziah Palace
- Interactive map of the Istana Maziah area

General information
- Type: Palace
- Location: Bukit Puteri, Kuala Terengganu, Terengganu, Malaysia, Kuala Terengganu, Malaysia
- Current tenants: Sultan of Terengganu
- Inaugurated: August 7, 1903

Height
- Height: 2 stories

Design and construction
- Architect: Tengku Chik Abu Bakar bin Tengku Abdul Jalil
- Other designers: Engku Besar Paduka Raja Sayyid Abdullah bin Zin Al-Idrus, Muhammad bin Abdul Rahim (Encik Mat), Dato’ Mata-Mata

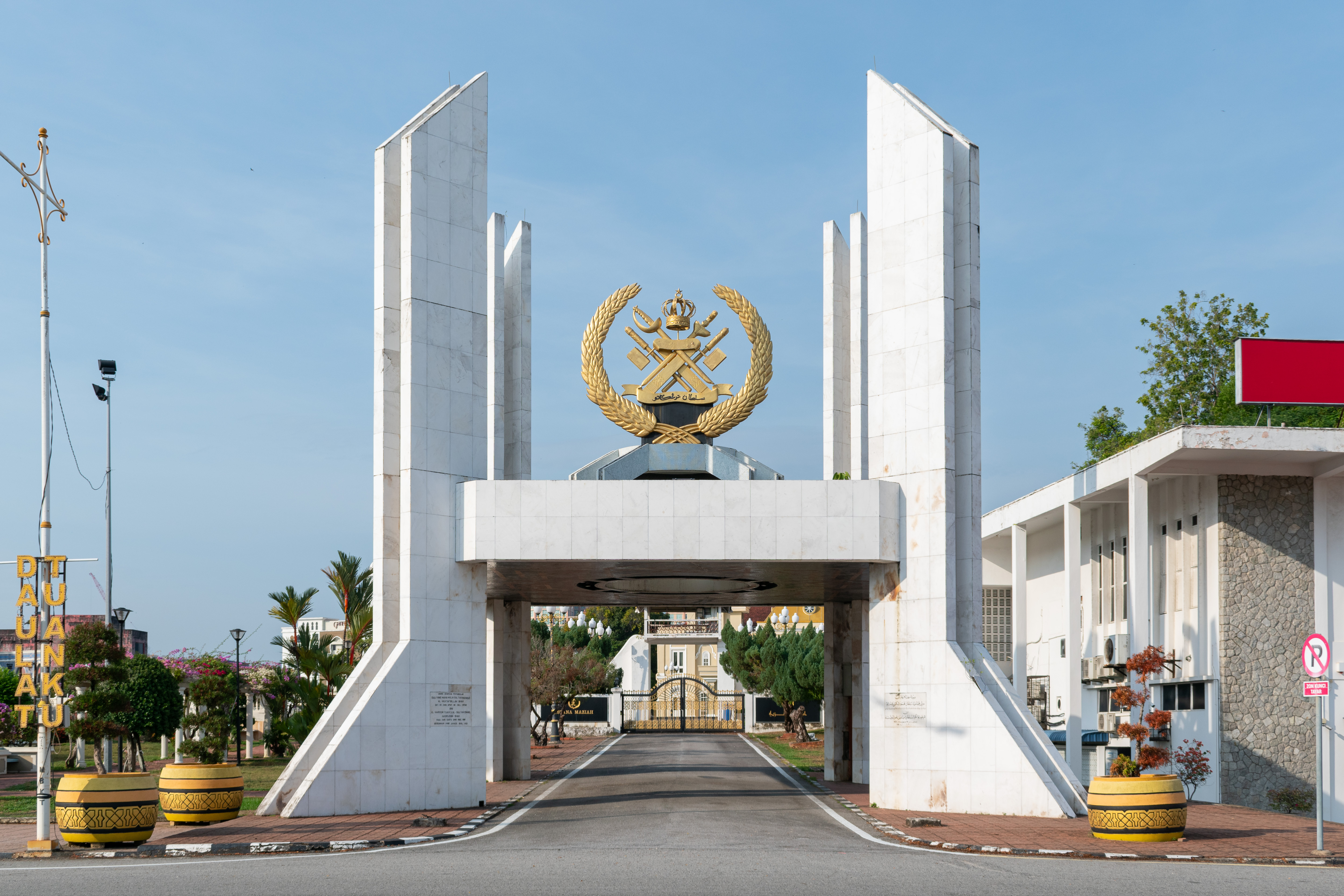
Entrance gate to Maziah Palace

Istana Maziah is the official palace of the Sultan of Terengganu. It is located at the foot of Bukit Puteri in Kuala Terengganu, Terengganu, Malaysia. The palace is the official venue for important functions such as royal birthdays, weddings, conferment of titles and receptions for local and foreign dignitaries.

== History ==
Istana Maziah was built to replace Istana Hijau (Green Palace) which was destroyed in a fire. Istana Hijau had been constructed during the reign of Sultan Omar (Baginda Omar) on 10 March 1870 (7 Zulhijjah 1286).

There are differing accounts about the exact date construction started on Istana Maziah. According to one record by Engku Pengiran Anum, the foundation stone of Istana Maziah was laid on Friday, May 31, 1895 (7 Zulhijjah 1312) at 10am during the reign of Sultan Zainal Abidin III (1881-1918). However, according to the records by Dato Seri Amar Diraja Haji Ngah Muhammad bin Yusof, the palace was built in 1897.

The architect of Istana Maziah is Tengku Chik Abu Bakar bin Tengku Abdul Jalil. He is a relative of Sultan Zainal Abidin III. Others also contributed towards the completion of the blue print and furnishing of Istana Maziah, including Engku Besar Paduka Raja Sayyid Abdullah bin Zin Al-Idrus, Muhammad bin Abdul Rahim (Encik Mat) and Dato’ Mata-Mata.

Wood supply to build the Istana came from the region of Dungun and this responsibility of obtaining it was entrusted to Tengku Panglima Besar Tengku Muda Kechik, while bricks and chalk were handled by Tengku Besar Paduka Indera.

Because of the constant lack of funds, the palace construction was delayed many times. When it was finally completed, the "upacara naik istana" ceremony, marking the sultan moving into the new palace was held on August 7, 1903 (14 Jamadil Awal 1312).

Several refurbishments were carried throughout the reign of Sultan Sulaiman Badrul Alam Shah (1920-1942) and Sultan Ismail Nasiruddin Shah (1945-1979). Further additions were carried out to the Istana buildings in 1972 and 1998.

== Architecture ==
The palace stands at a height of 2 storeys and is noticeably coffee brown in colour. It is a blend of modern and traditional architecture with its tall shuttered windows that resembles a French chateau. About 20 Malay and Chinese workers who were skilled in art, wood craft and carpentry were involved in the building of Istana Maziah. Its early foundations were built from a mixture of chalk, clay, sand salts, egg whites, lime and honey.

== Dataran Maziah ==
Dataran Maziah, which is located in front of Istana Maziah, is a mini-park beautifully adorned with landscapes of shrubs, trees and paved walkways. In the centre of the park, stands an impressive replica of betel chewing instruments such as Gobek Sireh and Kacip Pinang, also known as Tepak Sirih. The Tepak Sirih symbolises the culture and traditions of Terengganu.
