= Mizan Zainal Abidin of Terengganu =

King of Malaysia from 2006 to 2011

Mizan Zainal Abidin
- Al-Wathiqu Billah
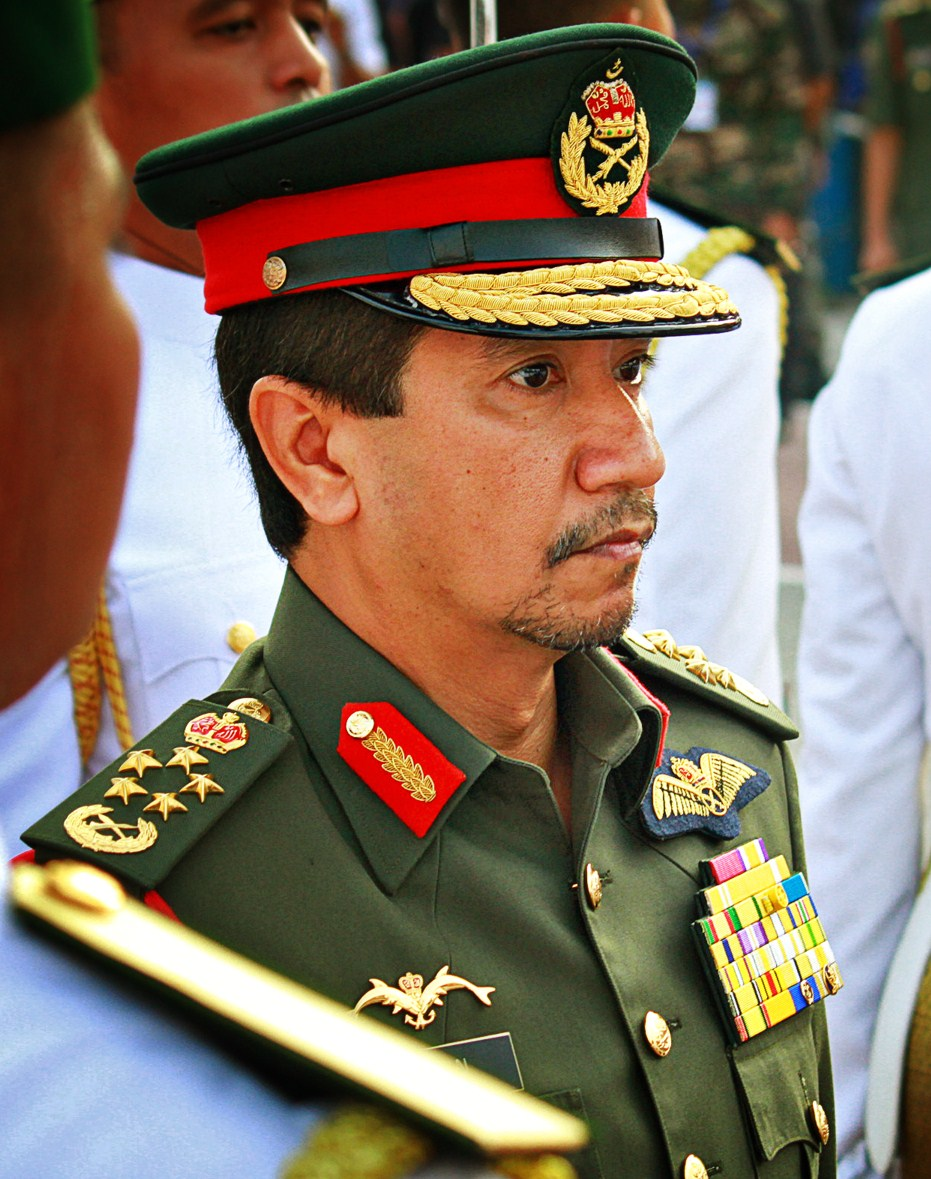
- Mizan in 2011

King of Malaysia
- Reign: 13 December 2006 – 12 December 2011
- Installation: 26 April 2007
- Predecessor: Sirajuddin
- Successor: Abdul Halim

Sultan of Terengganu
- Reign: 15 May 1998 – present
- Coronation: 4 March 1999
- Predecessor: Mahmud
- Heir apparent: Tengku Muhammad Ismail
- Born: 22 January 1962 (age 64); Istana Al-Muktafi, Terengganu, Federation of Malaya
- Spouse: Sultanah Nur Zahirah (m. 1996)
- Issue Detail: Tengku Nadhirah Zahrah; Tengku Muhammad Ismail; Tengku Muhammad Mua′az; Tengku Fatimatuz Zahra’
Names
- Tengku Mizan Zainal Abidin ibni Tengku Mahmud
Regnal name
- Al-Wathiqu Billah Sultan Mizan Zainal Abidin ibni Almarhum Sultan Mahmud Al-Muktafi Billah Shah
- House: Bendahara dynasty
- Father: Sultan Mahmud Al-Muktafi Billah Shah Ibni Almarhum Sultan Ismail Nasiruddin Shah
- Mother: Tengku Besar Terengganu Fatimah Sharifah Nong Alsagoff binti Abdillah
- Religion: Sunni Islam
- Military career
- Branch: Malaysian Army
- Rank: Field Marshal
- Unit: Royal Armoured Corps

Mizan Zainal Abidin of Terengganu
Medal record

Equestrian

Representing Malaysia

SEA Games
Gold medal – first place	2017 Kuala Lumpur	Individual endurance
Gold medal – first place	2017 Kuala Lumpur	Team endurance

Al-Wathiqu Billah Sultan Mizan Zainal Abidin ibni Almarhum Sultan Mahmud Al-Muktafi Billah Shah (Jawi: الواثق بالله سلطان ميزان زين العابدين ابن المرحوم سلطان محمود المکتفي بالله شاه; born 22 January 1962) is the Sultan of Terengganu, reigning since 1998. He previously reigned as the King of Malaysia, from 2006 to 2011.

== Early life and education ==
Mizan Zainal Abidin was born at the Istana Al-Muktafi in Kuala Terengganu, the eldest son of Sultan Mahmud by his second wife, Fatimah Sharifah Nong Alsagoff binti Abdillah. Sharifah's family is of Arab descent, from Sayid Omar Aljunied (her maternal great-grandfather), one of the modern pioneers of Singapore.

Mizan Zainal Abidin studied at Sekolah Kebangsaan Sultan Sulaiman and Sekolah Menengah Sultan Sulaiman, Kuala Terengganu. He went overseas to study at the Geelong Grammar School in Geelong, Australia. In 1988, he completed his undergraduate studies at US International University-Europe (now called Alliant International University) in London, earning a B.A. in International Relations.

Mizan participated in the military course PRE SMC (E) 33 at the Army School of Languages from 1982 to 1983. He then enrolled in the military course SMC 33 at Royal Military Academy Sandhurst in England, successfully completing the course as a cadet officer on 9 December 1983.

== Early career ==
On 15 September 1981, Tengku Mizan was appointed as Assistant Land Levy Collector, working for around a year at the District and Land Office in Kuala Terengganu, prior to his departure overseas to attend the military course in England. Mizan's next appointment in 1988 was as a State Administrative Officer at the State Economic Planning Unit (UPEN) in Wisma Darul Iman, Kuala Terengganu. Besides working for UPEN, Mizan was also seconded as an Assistant District Land Officer at the Kuala Terengganu District and Land Office.

== Crown Prince of Terengganu ==
Mizan was appointed the Yang di-Pertuan Muda (Crown Prince) of Terengganu on 6 November 1979. On 20 October 1990, he was appointed the Regent of Terengganu until 8 November 1990.

From 1990 to 1995, Mizan was President of the Council for Islam and Malay Culture of Terengganu.

== Sultan of Terengganu ==
Mizan became the youngest ruler of a Malaysian federal state when he acceded as the Sultan of Terengganu on 15 May 1998 following the death of his father Mahmud. Mizan was crowned as the 17th Sultan of Terengganu on 4 March 1999.

=== 2008 Menteri Besar Appointment Crisis ===
Terengganu, where the Barisan Nasional won two-thirds of the seats in the state parliament, was the last to appoint a Menteri Besar (Chief Minister) after the 2008 general elections. In the formation of Terengganu's new state government, the federal government under Prime Minister Abdullah Ahmad Badawi recommended Idris Jusoh as Menteri Besar, who received full support from 23 of the 24 Barisan Nasional state assemblymen elected. However, on 22 March, the office of the Sultan of Terengganu announced the appointment of Kijal assemblyman Ahmad Said instead of Idris Jusoh, as was the Sultan's constitutional right.

The Prime Minister claimed that the appointment of Ahmad Said was unconstitutional as it went against the wishes of the assemblymen and the Prime Minister's office, all of whom had supported Idris Jusoh's candidacy for Menteri Besar.

On 26 March, Prime Minister Abdullah Ahmad Badawi and Sultan Mizan Zainal Abidin met at the Istana Negara to resolve the impasse. The Prime Minister accepted the King's appointment of Ahmad Said as Menteri Besar of Terengganu. He also apologised to the King for the public dispute over the appointment of the Menteri Besar, explaining that there was no intention to disparage or humiliate the royal household. This apparent climbdown was due to the possibility that the royal household would be prepared to dissolve the state assembly if there had been a motion of no-confidence against Ahmad Said by the 23 UMNO state assemblymen.

== Deputy Yang di-Pertuan Agong ==
Mizan was appointed Deputy Yang di-Pertuan Agong on 26 April 1999 after Sultan Salahuddin of Selangor was elected the 11th Yang di-Pertuan Agong by the Conference of Rulers. Following the illness and subsequently death of Salahuddin, Mizan served as Acting Yang di-Pertuan Agong from 8 October to 12 December 2001.

Mizan was re-appointed Deputy Yang di-Pertuan Agong on 13 December 2001 after the Conference of Rulers elected Raja Sirajuddin of Perlis as the 12th Yang di-Pertuan Agong.

Mizan served as the first Chancellor of Universiti Malaysia Terengganu (UMT) from 2001 to 2006.

== Yang di-Pertuan Agong ==
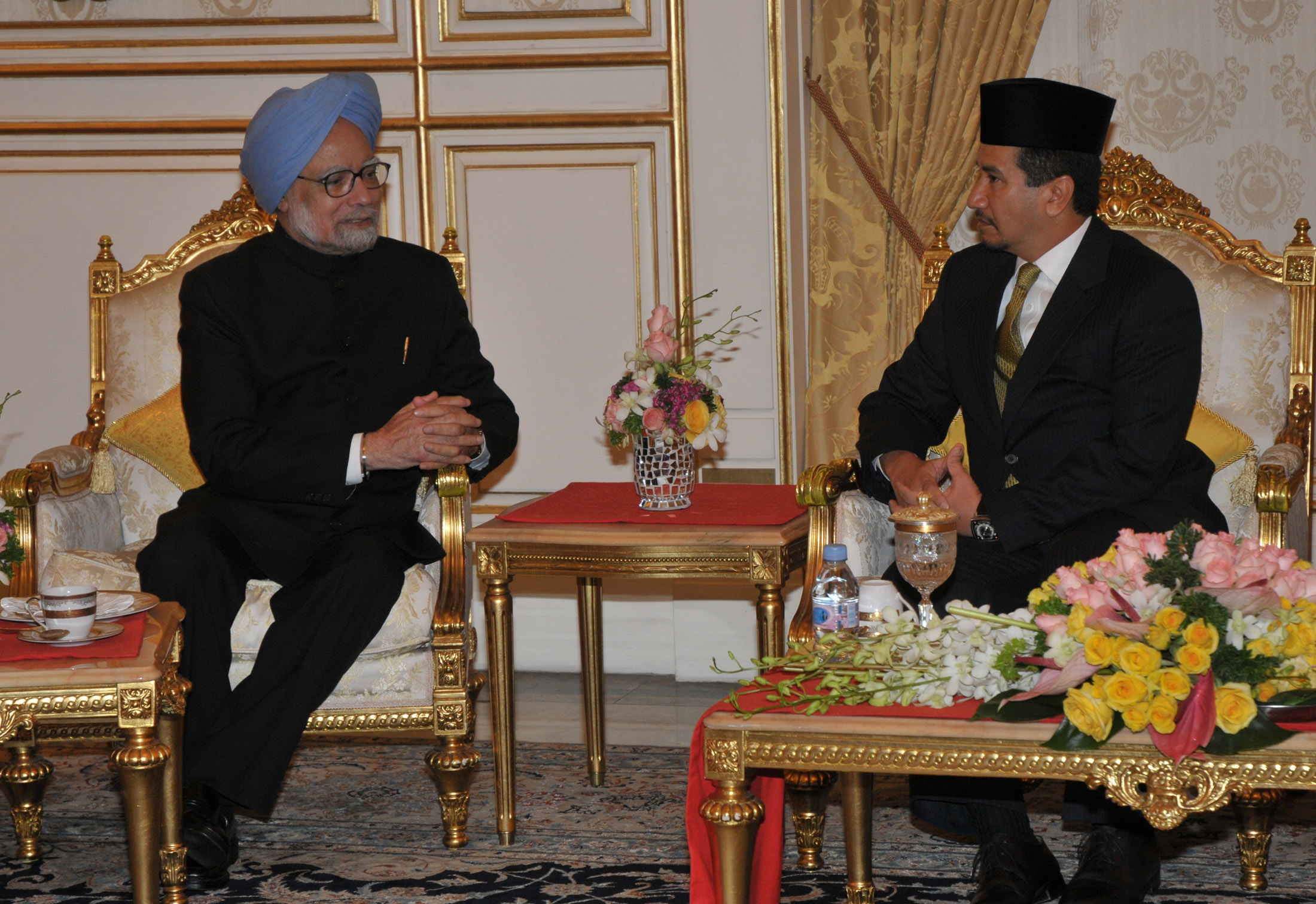
Mizan (right) with Indian Prime Minister Manmohan Singh, 2010

On 3 November 2006, Mizan was elected by the Conference of Rulers to become the 13th Yang di-Pertuan Agong, with his five-year term starting 13 December 2006. The Conference of Rulers appointed Sultan Abdul Halim of Kedah as the Deputy Yang di-Pertuan Agong. Mizan's appointment was the fourth following a second rotation system amongst the nine Malay Rulers. This five-year rotational constitutional monarchy is unique to Malaysia.

On 26 April 2007, Mizan was formally installed as the Yang di-Pertuan Agong.

== Marriage and family ==
Mizan married Sultanah Nur Zahirah on 28 March 1996 in Kuala Terengganu.

The royal couple have two sons and two daughters:

- Her Highness Tengku Nadhirah Zahrah, the Tengku Puteri Utama Raja (born 18 December 1996)
- His Royal Highness Tengku Muhammad Ismail, the Crown Prince (born 1 March 1998)
- His Highness Tengku Muhammad Mua′az, the Tengku Sri Setia Mahkota Raja (born 22 December 2000)
- Her Highness Tengku Fatimatuz Zahra', the Tengku Puteri Daulath Raja (born 19 April 2002)

After Sultan Mizan was elected as the Yang di-Pertuan Agong, he appointed Tengku Muhammad Ismail, then aged eight, as regent on 12 November 2006. Because of Tengku Muhammad Ismail's young age, a three-member Regency Advisory Council was established to discharge his duties for him. The council's members were Tengku Baderulzaman, Sultan Mizan's younger brother, Tengku Sulaiman Ismail, Sultan Mizan's uncle, and former Federal Court judge Dato' Abdul Kadir Sulaiman. He was proclaimed as regent during a ceremony on 12 December.

Upon reaching Mukallaf (13 years of age), the Islamic age of responsibility, and according to Sharia law and the constitution of Terengganu, Tengku Muhammad Ismail became able to discharge his duties himself. However, the Sultan formed another council, Majlis Perwakilan Pemangku Raja, to perform the Regent's duty while he was away from Terengganu pursuing his studies. This second and current council is headed by Tengku Mustafa Kamel, another of Sultan Mizan's younger brothers, together with former Regency Advisory Council members Tengku Sri Laksamana Raja Tengku Sulaiman Ismail and Dato' Haji Abdul Kadir Sulaiman.

During his younger days, Sultan Mizan was a keen footballer. He is currently active in golf, endurance riding and scuba diving. In addition, the Global Taekwondo Federation (GTF) awarded Mizan an Honorary 7th Degree Black Belt in recognition of his active participation in the sport.

== Honours ==
=== Honours of Terengganu ===
- Supreme Royal Family Order of Terengganu: Grand Master and recipient (DKT, since 15 May 1998)
- Royal Family Order of Terengganu: Founding Grand Master and recipient (DKR, 6 July 2000)
- Family Order of Terengganu: First Class (DK I, 9 March 1981) and Grand Master (since 15 May 1998)
- Order of Sultan Mizan Zainal Abidin of Terengganu
  - Founding Grand Master and Knight Grand Companion (SSMZ, 6 July 2001)
  - Founding Supreme class (SUMZ, 26 May 2005)
- Order of Sultan Mahmud I of Terengganu: Member Grand Companion (SSMT, 12 February 1989) and Grand Master (since 15 May 1998)
- Order of the Crown of Terengganu: Knight Grand Commander (SPMT, 6 March 1982) and Grand Master (since 15 May 1998)
- Recipient of the Sultan Mahmud Al-Muktafi Billah Shah Coronation Medal (21 March 1981)
- Recipient of the Sultan Mizan Zainal Abidin Coronation Medal (4 March 1999)
- Recipient of Sultan Mizan Zainal Abidin Silver Jubilee Medal (2023)

=== Honours of Malaysia ===
- Malaysia (as Yang di-Pertuan Agong from 13 December 2006 until 12 December 2011)
  - Member (5 April 2007) and Grand Master of the Most Excellent Order of the Royal Family of Malaysia (DKM) (13 December 2006 – 2 December 2011)
  - Recipient (27 February 1999) and Grand Master of the Most Exalted Order of the Crown of the Realm (DMN) (13 December 2006 – 2 December 2011)
  - Grand Master of the Most Esteemed Order of the Defender of the Realm (13 December 2006 – 2 December 2011)
  - Grand Master of the Most Esteemed Order of Loyalty to the Crown of Malaysia (13 December 2006 – 2 December 2011)
  - Grand Master of the Order of Merit (13 December 2006 – 2 December 2011)
  - Grand Master of the Distinguished Order of Meritorious Service (13 December 2006 – 2 December 2011)
  - Grand Master of the Most Distinguished Order of Loyalty to the Royal Family of Malaysia (13 December 2006 – 2 December 2011)
  - Recipient of the 11th Yang di-Pertuan Agong Installation Medal
  - Recipient of the 12th Yang di-Pertuan Agong Installation Medal
  - Recipient of the 13th Yang di-Pertuan Agong Installation Medal
  - Recipient of the 15th Yang di-Pertuan Agong Installation Medal
  - Recipient of the 16th Yang di-Pertuan Agong Installation Medal
  - Recipient of the 17th Yang di-Pertuan Agong Installation Medal
- Johor
  - First Class of the Royal Family Order of Johor (DK I)
  - Knight Grand Commander of the Order of the Crown of Johor (SPMJ) – Dato' (8 April 1986)
  - Recipient of Sultan Ibrahim Ismail Coronation Medal
- Kedah
  - Member of the Royal Family Order of Kedah (DK) (21 January 2002)
- Kelantan
  - Recipient of the Royal Family Order of Kelantan (DK) (30 March 2002)
- Negeri Sembilan
  - Member of the Royal Family Order of Negeri Sembilan (DKNS) (19 July 2001)
- Perak
  - Recipient of the Royal Family Order of Perak (DK) (20 April 1999)
- Perlis
  - Recipient of the Perlis Family Order of the Gallant Prince Syed Putra Jamalullail (DK) (28 May 1998)
  - Recipient of Tuanku Syed Sirajuddin Jamalullail Silver Jubilee Medal (2025)
- Selangor
  - First Class of the Royal Family Order of Selangor (DK) (10 April 2003)

=== Foreign Honours ===
- Brunei
  - Recipient of the Royal Family Order of the Crown of Brunei (DKMB) (9 March 1999)
- Chile
  - Grand Cross with Collar of the Order of the Merit of Chile
- France
  - Commander of the National Order of the Legion of Honour
- Indonesia
  - First class (or Adipurna) of the Star of the Republic of Indonesia (17 October 2011)
- Qatar
  - Grand Cordon of the Order of Independence of Qatar (13 December 2010)
- Thailand
  - Knight of the Order of Rajamitrabhorn (9 March 2009)

=== Honorary doctorate ===
- Northern Ireland
  - Honorary degree Doctor of Laws from the Queen's University Belfast – (17 February 2009)

== Legacy ==
=== Educational institutions ===
- Institut Pendidikan Guru, Kampus Sultan Mizan in Besut
- Politeknik Sultan Mizan Zainal Abidin in Dungun
- SMK Tengku Mizan Zainal Abidin in Kuala Terengganu

=== Buildings, Bridges and Roads ===
- Tuanku Mizan Zainal Abidin Mosque (known as Iron Mosque) in Putrajaya
- Sultan Mizan Zainal Abidin Stadium in Kuala Terengganu
- Tengku Mizan Zainal Abidin Mosque in Kerteh
- Hospital Angkatan Tentera Tuanku Mizan Zainal Abidin in Wangsa Maju, Kuala Lumpur (Main Military Hospital)
- Jalan Tengku Mizan on Federal Route 65 in Kuala Terengganu

=== Others ===
- Yayasan DiRaja Sultan Mizan (YDSM) or Sultan Mizan Royal Foundation

Mizan Zainal Abidin of Terengganu Bendahara dynasty Born: 1962
Regnal titles
Preceded by Mahmud	Sultan of Terengganu; 1998–present	Incumbent; Heir apparent: Muhammad Ismail
Preceded by Salahuddin	Regent of Malaysia; 2001	Succeeded by Sirajuddin
Preceded by Sirajuddin	Yang di-Pertuan Agong of Malaysia; 2006–2011	Succeeded by Abdul Halim
