= Order of the Crown of Perlis =

Honorific order of the Kingdom of Perlis

Order of the Crown of Perlis Darjah Kebesaran Mahkota Perlis

Awarded by Raja of Perlis
- Type: Order
- Established: 21 September 1965
- Royal house: House of Jamalullail
- Ribbon: Yellow and Dark blue
- Motto: Kerana Raja dan Negeri (Note: Jawi: كران راج دان نڬري) (For Ruler and the State)
- Status: Currently constituted
- Founder: Putra of Perlis
- Sovereign: Sirajuddin of Perlis
- Grades: Knight Grand Commander; Knight Commander; Companion; Member; Medal
- Post-nominals: S.P.M.P.; D.P.M.P.; S.M.P.; A.M.P.; P.M.P.

Precedence
- Next (higher): Order of Prince Syed Sirajuddin Jamalullail of Perlis
- Next (lower): Order for Dato' Titleholders

The Most Illustrious Order of the Crown of Perlis or the Star of Safi (Malay: Darjah Kebesaran Mahkota Perlis Yang Amat Mulia or Bintang Al-Safi) is an honorific order of the Kingdom of Perlis.

== History ==
The order was established and first conferred on 21 September 1965 as recognition a distinguished service for the nation and the state of Perlis.

In early establishment, the order was only divided into three ranks: Knight Grand Commander, Knight Commander and Companion. The rank of Member was added on 27 June 1971, followed by the rank of Medal on 22 June 1995.

== Order ranks ==
The order has five ranks:

=== Knight Grand Commander ===
Knight Grand Commander of the Order of the Crown of Perlis (S.P.M.P.) (Malay: Darjah Seri Paduka Mahkota Perlis (Al-Safi I))

There is no limit to the number of persons to be awarded this honour and can also be conferred on foreign citizens as an honorary award. The recipient of this award receives the title Dato' Seri and the wife of a male recipient receives Datin Seri.

This rank comprises collar, sash, breast star and badge.

=== Knight Commander ===
Knight Commander of the Order of the Crown of Perlis (D.P.M.P.) (Malay: Darjah Dato' Paduka Mahkota Perlis (Al-Safi II))

There is no limit to the number of persons to be awarded this honour and can also be conferred on foreign citizens as an honorary award. The recipient of this award receives the title Dato' and the wife of a male recipient receives Datin.

This rank comprises sash with badge and breast star.

=== Companion ===
Companion of the Order of the Crown of Perlis (S.M.P.) (Malay: Darjah Setia Mahkota Perlis (Al-Safi III))

There is no limit to the number of persons to be awarded this honour and can also be conferred on foreign citizens as an honorary award. It does not carry any title.

This rank comprises neck ribbon with badge.

=== Member ===
Member of the Order of the Crown of Perlis (A.M.P.) (Malay: Darjah Ahli Mahkota Perlis (Al-Safi IV))

There is no limit to the number of persons to be awarded this honour and can also be conferred on foreign citizens as an honorary award. It does not carry any title.

This rank comprises medal ribbon for male recipient or bow ribbon for female recipient with badge.

=== Medal ===
Medal of the Order of the Crown of Perlis (P.M.P.) (Malay: Pingat Mahkota Perlis (Al-Safi V))

There is no limit to the number of persons to be awarded this honour and can also be conferred on foreign citizens as an honorary award. It does not carry any title.

This rank comprises medal ribbon for male recipient or bow ribbon for female recipient with gold medal.

== Timeline of ribbon ==
Ranks (Post-nominals)	1965–1970	1971–1994	Since 1995
Knight Grand Commander (S.P.M.P.)			
Knight Commander (D.P.M.P.)			
Companion (S.M.P.)			
Member (A.M.P.)	---		
Medal (P.M.P.)	---	---	

== Notable recipients ==
=== Knights Grand Commander (S.P.M.P.) ===
- 1965: Abdul Razak Hussein
- 1967: Tengku Fauziah
- 1970: Crown Princess Michiko (Honorary)
- 1971: Datu Mustapha Datu Harun
- 1976: Tengku Ahmad Rithauddeen Ismail
- 1979: Abang Muhammad Salahuddin
- 1979: Abdul Rahman Ya'kub
- 1988: Raja Perempuan Tengku Anis
- 1994: Abdul Hamid Pawanteh
- 1995: Syed Zainol Anwar Jamalullail
- 1995: Shahidan Kassim
- 1995: Halim Saad
- 1996: Che Md Noor Mat Arshad
- 1998: Tuanku Syed Faizuddin Putra Jamalullail
- 2001: Tunku Naquiyuddin
- 2002: Tuanku Lailatul Shahreen Akashah
- 2003: Mohd Zahidi Zainuddin
- 2005: Azmi Khalid
- 2005: Mohd Radzi Sheikh Ahmad
- 2006: Nor Mohamed Yakcop
- 2006: Mohd Effendi Norwawi
- 2007: Muhyiddin Yassin
- 2007: Hishammuddin Hussein
- 2007: Jamaluddin Jarjis
- 2007: Abdul Aziz Zainal
- 2007: Musa Hassan
- 2008: Md Isa Sabu
- 2008: Shafie Apdal
- 2010: Rais Yatim
- 2010: Abdullah Md Zin
- 2011: Liow Tiong Lai
- 2011: Zulkifeli Mohd Zin
- 2012: Mohamed Dzaiddin Abdullah
- 2012: Ismail Omar
- 2013: Noor Hisham Abdullah
- 2014: Azlan Man
- 2014: Mustapa Mohamed
- 2014: Khalid Abu Bakar
- 2017: Ali Hamsa
- 2017: Raja Mohamed Affandi
- 2022: Awang Adek Hussin
- 2026: Shamsul Azri Abu Bakar
- 2026: Malek Razak Sulaiman
- 2026: Razarudin Husain
- 2026: Mohd Khalid Ismail
- 2026: Wan Ahmad Dahlan Abdul Aziz
- Unknown: Raja Nazrin Shah

=== Knights Commander (D.P.M.P.) ===
- 1971: Syed Nasir Ismail
- 1974: Arshad Ayub
- 1985: Mohd Radzi Sheikh Ahmad
- 1990: Syed Danial Syed Ahmad
- 1994: Che Md Noor Mat Arshad
- 1994: Fadzil Mahmood
- 1995: Mazlan Ahmad
- 1995: Abdul Gani Patail
- 1995: Syed Jalaludin Syed Salim
- 1996: Azmi Khalid
- 2000: Chitchai Wannasathit (Honorary)
- 2002: Md Isa Sabu
- 2003: Ng Yen Yen
- 2004: Dzulkifli Abdul Razak
- 2004: Chor Chee Heung
- 2007: Ismail Kassim
- 2008: Tiki Lafe
- 2010: Noor Hisham Abdullah
- 2013: Ranjit Singh Ramday
- 2018: Asma Ismail

=== Companions (S.M.P.) ===
- 1977: Ahmad Sarji Abdul Hamid
- 1980: Azmi Khalid
- 1988: Che Md Noor Mat Arshad
- 2003: Zahidi Zainul Abidin
- 2003: Mohamad Norza Zakaria
- 2005: Ismail Kassim
- 2011: Hashim Jasin
- 2025: Rus'sele Eizan

=== Members (A.M.P.) ===
- 1980: Shahidan Kassim
- 2001: Mohamad Norza Zakaria
- 2001: Ranjit Singh Ramday
- 2005: Mohamad Shukri Abdull
- 2014: Abu Bakar Hamzah
- Unknown: Che Md Noor Mat Arshad
- Unknown: Hussin Ismail
- Unknown: Mohd Azumi Mohamed

=== Medalists (P.M.P.) ===
- 2003: Mazlan Lazim
- 2010: Abu Bakar Hamzah

== See also ==
- Orders, decorations, and medals of the Malaysian states and federal territories#Perlis
- Orders, decorations, and medals of Perlis
- List of post-nominal letters (Perlis)
