= Family tree of Perlisian monarchs =

Perlis was part of Kedah Sultanate from at least the mid-16th century. Its boundaries were first demarcated in 1770, when Sultan, Muhammad Jiwa II of Kedah, presented the territory to his younger son, Tunku Dhiauddin. When Tunku Dhiauddin ascended to the Kedahan throne, he in turn presented Arau to his son-in-law Syed Harun Jamalullail, who assumed the title of Penghulu ('chief') of Arau. In 1825, Syed Harun died and his son Syed Hussein succeeded him as Penghulu of Arau. He assumed office during a period of turmoil when Kedah – including Perlis – was invaded by Siam, and later administered by the Siamese governor of Ligor. Following the death of Governor of Ligor in 1839, Perlis was detached from Kedah and designated as a separate Siamese tributary. A Malay chieftain was appointed Chiom ('chief') of Perlis while Syed Hussein was made his deputy. Within four months however, the Chiom of Perlis died and in 1841, Syed Hussein travelled to Bangkok and secured the recognition from Rama III to install him as the Phya ('King') of Perlis. His accession marked the founding of Jamalullail dynasty which continues to rule Perlis in the present day.

House of Jamalullail

Ba 'Alawi sada
Syed Harun; Penghulu r. 1798–1825
Syed Hussein; Penghulu r. 1825–1841; Raja^{(1)} r. 1841–1873
Syed Ahmad^{(2)} r. 1873–1897
Syed Alwi b. 1844 d. 1864
Syed Safi^{(3)} r. 1897–1904
Syed Mahmud	Syed Alwi^{(4)} r. 1904–1943	Syed Hamzah^{(5)} r. 1943–1945
Syed Hassan
Sultanate of Patani
Syed Harun Putra^{(6)} r. 1945–2000; YDP Agong III r. 1960–1965	Tuanku Tengku Budriah; Raja Perempuan Perlis r. 1946–2000; Raja Permaisuri Agong III r. 1960–1965
House of Bendahara-Terengganu
Syed Sirajuddin^{(7)} r. 2000–present YDP Agong XII r. 2001–2006	Tuanku Tengku Fauziah; Raja Perempuan Perlis r. 2000–present Raja Permaisuri Agong XII r. 2001–2006
Syed Faizuddin; Putra; Raja Muda Perlis
Syed Sirajuddin; Areeb Putra

== Bibliography ==
- Ahmad Sarji Abdul Hamid (2011), The Encyclopedia of Malaysia, vol. 16 - The Rulers of Malaysia, Editions Didier Millet, ISBN 978-981-3018-54-9
