= Tuanku Lailatul Shahreen Akashah =

Consort of the Crown Prince of Perlis (born 1970)

Tuanku Lailatul Shahreen Akashah توانكو ليلة الشهرين عكاشة

Raja Puan Muda of Perlis
- Reign: 1 August 2000 – present
- Assumed: 12 October 2000
- Predecessor: Tuanku Tengku Fauziah
- Born: Lailatul Shahreen Akashah binti Khalil; 28 March 1970 (age 56); Kuala Lumpur Hospital, Malaysia
- Spouse: Tuanku Syed Faizuddin Putra Jamalullail (m. 1994)
- Issue: Sharifah Khatreena Nuraniah Jamalullail; Sharifah Farah Adriana Jamalullail; Syed Sirajuddin Areeb Putra Jamalullail
- Lailatul Shahreen Akashah binti Dato' Khalil
Regnal name
- Tuanku Dr. Hajah Lailatul Shahreen Akashah Khalil
- House: Jamalullail (by marriage)
- Father: Dato' Khalil Akashah
- Mother: Datin Nik Rahimah Wan Ahmad
- Religion: Sunni Islam

Tuanku Lailatul Shahreen Akashah Khalil (née Lailatul Shahreen Akashah binti Khalil, Jawi: توانكو حاجة ليلة الشهرين عكاشة خليل; born March 28, 1970 at Kuala Lumpur Hospital, Malaysia) is the Raja Puan Muda (Crown Princess) of Perlis as the wife of Tuanku Syed Faizuddin Putra Jamalullail, the Raja Muda (Crown Prince) of Perlis.

== Early life ==
Tuanku Lailatul Shahreen was born on 28 March 1970 as the second of the four children of Dato' Khalil Akashah and Datin Nik Rahimah Wan Ahmad. Her other siblings include Lailatul Zuraidha Akashah (born 1968), Khalimahtul Idereena (born 1976) and Khalimahtul Ema Durrah (born 1983).

== Education ==
Tuanku Lailatul Shahreen received her education at Bukit Nenas Convent School, Kuala Lumpur from 1977 to 1984, and then continued her studies at Melbourne Girls Grammar School, Merton Hall, Australia. She successfully graduated with a Bachelor of Arts degree from La Trobe University, Melbourne in 1992 and a Master of Public Administration (MPA) degree from Universiti Sains Malaysia in Penang in 2014. She was also awarded Honoris Causa in Health Sciences by the Universidad Nacional Pedro Henriquez Ureña, Dominican Republic. She currently serves as the Pro-Chancellor of the Universiti Malaysia Perlis.

On 25 May 2023, Tuanku Lailatul Shahreen obtained her Doctor of Philosophy (PhD) degree in Islamic studies from Universiti Malaya. She conducted scientific research titled "The Importance of Islamic Regal Leadership In Zakat Delivery To The Asnaf In Perlis".

== Career ==
Tuanku Lailatul Shahreen is actively associated with several associations and serves as patron of several NGO bodies, including:

- Registered Babysitters Association of Malaysia
- National Association of Autism Malaysia
- Malaysian Women's Malay Chamber of Commerce (WOMENITA) Perlis State

She was also appointed as the chairman of two social bodies, namely the La Trobe University Alumni Association (PALTUM) and the Tuanku Fauizah Foundation (YTF). Until 1995, she held the position as Administrative Manager of ASIE Sdn. Bhd. but decided to resign from the position to accompany her husband, Tuanku Syed Faizuddin Putra in carrying out his official duties abroad, in Madrid (1995–1998) and Zürich (1998–2002).

== Marriage and children ==
Tuanku Lailatul Shahreen first met Tuanku Syed Faizuddin Putra, the Raja Muda of Perlis while continuing her studies in Australia. She married Tuanku Syed Faizuddin Putra on 9 March 1994. The wedding ceremony took place at various locations including Damansara Heights, Kuala Lumpur; Hilton Hotel, Kuala Lumpur and Kota Bharu, Kelantan and at Dewan Warisan, Kangar.

The royal couple has three children:

Name	Date Of Birth	Place Of Birth	Age
Her Highness Sharifah Khatreena Nuraniah	10 February 1995	Pantai Hospital, Kuala Lumpur	31 years, 3 months and 30 days
Her Highness Sharifah Farah Adriana	4 March 2001	Zolikerberg Hospital, Zurich Switzerland	25 years, 3 months and 5 days
His Highness Syed Sirajuddin Areeb Putra	12 April 2009	Hospital Tuanku Fauizah (HTF), Kangar	17 years, 1 month and 28 days

== Styles and honours ==
Styles of Tuanku Lailatul Shahreen Akashah
- Reference style: Her Highness
- Spoken style: Your Highness
- Alternative style: Tuanku

- Perlis
  - Knight Grand Companion of the Order of the Gallant Prince Syed Sirajuddin Jamalullail (SSSJ) – Dato' Seri Diraja (17 May 2026)
  - Knight Grand Commander of the Order of the Crown of Perlis (SPMP) – Dato' Seri (17 May 2002)

== Eponyms ==
- Tuanku Lailatul Shahreen National Secondary School, Kangar, Perlis
- Tuanku Lailatul Shahreen Paper Flower Garden, Kangar, Perlis
