= Perlis Family Order of the Gallant Prince Syed Putra Jamalullail =

Dynastic order of Perlis

The Most Esteemed Perlis Family Order of the Gallant Prince Syed Putra Jamalullail Darjah Kerabat Perlis Tuanku Syed Putra Jamalullail Yang Amat Dihormati

Awarded by the Raja of Perlis
- Type: Dynastic order
- Established: 21 September 1965
- Royal house: Jamalullail
- Status: Currently constituted
- Founder: Tuanku Sir Syed Harun Putra
- Grand Master: Tuanku Syed Sirajuddin
- Grades: Member
- Post-nominals: D.K.

Statistics
- First induction: 1965
- Last induction: 2019

Precedence
- Next (higher): Royal Family Order of Perlis
- Next (lower): Order of Dato’ Bendahara Sri Jamalullail
- Ribbon bar of the order

The Most Esteemed Perlis Family Order of the Gallant Prince Syed Putra Jamalullail (Malay: Darjah Kerabat Perlis Tuanku Syed Putra Jamalullail Yang Amat Dihormati) is the second highest chivalric and dynastic order of Perlis belonging to the House of Jamalullail. The order was constituted on 21 September 1965 by Tuanku Sir Syed Harun Putra, the Raja of Perlis to recognize the contributions and friendship with the other Malay rulers.

The order was the state's highest chivalric honour until the creation of the Royal Family Order of Perlis in 2001 by Raja Tuanku Syed Sirajuddin.

== History ==
The Perlis Family Order of the Gallant Prince Syed Putra Jamalullail was established on 21 September 1965 by Tuanku Sir Syed Harun Putra, the Raja of Perlis. The order is conferred on the Sultans of the Malay states, their consorts, senior members of the Perlis royal family, and foreign heads of state and their consorts and in exceptional cases, on esteemed senior statesmen.

== Grade and insignia ==
The Perlis Family Order of the Gallant Prince Syed Putra Jamalullail is conferred in the single grade of Member. The recipients of the order bear the post-nominal letters of D.K. The reigning monarch, or Raja, is the Grand Master of the order and all inductions are made at his pleasure.

The insignia of the order consists of a collar, sash, badge, and star. The sash of the order is a yellow riband with a green border.

== Recipients ==
- 1965: Tuanku Sir Syed Harun Putra, Raja of Perlis (founder)
- 1965: Tengku Budriah, Raja Perempuan of Perlis
- 1965: Tuanku Syed Sirajuddin, Raja of Perlis (then Raja Muda)
- 1965: Tunku Abdul Rahman
- 1970: Sultan Salahuddin Abdul Aziz Shah Al-Haj, Sultan of Selangor
- 1978: Sultan Yahya Petra, Sultan of Kelantan
- 1980: Sultan Abdul Halim Mu'adzam Shah, Sultan of Kedah
- 1980: Sultan Ismail Petra, Sultan of Kelantan
- 1980: Sultan Ahmad Shah Al-Musta’in Billah, Sultan of Pahang
- 1982: Tuanku Ja'afar, Yang di-Pertuan Besar of Negeri Sembilan
- 1984: Sultan Mahmud Al-Muktafi Billah Shah, Sultan of Terengganu
- 1985: Sultan Azlan Muhibbuddin Shah, Sultan of Perak
- 1985: Sultan Iskandar, Sultan of Johor
- 1988: Sultan Hassanal Bolkiah, Sultan of Brunei
- 1995: Tun Mahathir Mohamad
- 1998: Sultan Mizan Zainal Abidin, Sultan of Terengganu
- 1999: Tuanku Tengku Fauziah, Raja Perempuan of Perlis
- 1999: Tengku Anis, Raja Perempuan of Kelantan
- 2001: Tuanku Syed Faizuddin Putra Jamalullail, Raja Muda of Perlis
- 2002: Sultan Sharafuddin Idris Shah, Sultan of Selangor
- 2009: Tuanku Muhriz, Yang di-Pertuan Besar of Negeri Sembilan
- 2010: Sultan Ibrahim Iskandar, Sultan of Johor
- 2011: Sultan Muhammad V, Sultan of Kelantan
- 2015: Sultan Nazrin Shah, Sultan of Perak
- 2018: Sultan Sallehuddin, Sultan of Kedah
- 2019: Al-Sultan Abdullah Ri'ayatuddin Al-Mustafa Billah, Sultan of Pahang

== See also ==
- Orders, decorations, and medals of the Malaysian states and federal territories#Perlis
- Orders, decorations, and medals of Perlis
- List of post-nominal letters (Perlis)
