= Laws of the Constitution of Perlis =

Constitution of the state of Perlis, Malaysia

- The coat of arms of Perlis

Overview
- Original title: Undang-Undang Tubuh Kerajaan Perlis
- Jurisdiction: Perlis, Malaysia
- Subordinate to: Federal Constitution of Malaysia
- Created: 26 March 1959
- Ratified: 28 February 1959
- Date effective: 1 March 1959
- System: Parliamentary democracy Constitutional monarchy

Government structure
- Branches: Two (Legislative and Executive)
- Head of state: Raja of Perlis
- Chambers: Unicameral
- Executive: State Executive Council
- Signatories: Syed Hussain Syed Zain Jamalullail; Mohd Razzali Ali Wasi; Ahmad Mohamad; Wan Ahmad Wan Daud; Sheikh Ahmad Mohd Hashim
- Supersedes: First Part of the Laws of the Constitution of Perlis (1948); Second Part of the Laws of the Constitution of Perlis (1950)

Footnote
- Undang-Undang Tubuh Kerajaan Perlis

The Laws of the Constitution of Perlis is the constitution of the state of Perlis in Malaysia and establishes the state as a constitutional monarchy with the Raja of Perlis as its head of state. It also laid down the fundamental structure and machinery of government in Perlis, such as the state executive council and the state legislative assembly. It came into force in March 1959 following the independence of Federation of Malaya in 1957.

== History ==
The First Part of the Laws of the Constitution of Perlis was first introduced on 1 February 1948, following the formation of Federation of Malaya. Under the State Agreement, the Malay Rulers are required to promulgated their State Constitution of which are used to distinguish the legislative power from the executive power by constituting a legislative body. The Second Part of the constitution was introduced on 30 December 1950.

After Malaya gained independence, following the Fourth Schedule of Federation of Malaya Agreement 1957, the previous Laws of the Constitution of Perlis was revoked and replaced with the current Laws of the Constitution of Perlis in 1959.

== Composition ==
The Constitution, in its current form (1 January 2008), consists of 4 Parts, 20 chapters containing 83 articles and no schedule.

=== Citation ===
Article 1 states that the Laws of the Constitution of Perlis is read subject to the Federal Constitution.

=== Part I ===
Part I contains four articles; article 2 to 4A that pertains to the interpretation of the terminologies used in the constitution, interpretation of the constitution by the High Court, amendment and reprint of the constitution.

=== Part II ===
Part II contains two articles; article 5 and 6 that pertains to the religion of the state and Raja's role as the Head of Religion. It also provides that everyone has the freedom to practice his own religion.

=== Part III ===
==== Part III Preliminary ====
Part III Preliminary consists of three articles; article 7 to 9 that pertains to the interpretation of terminologies related to the heir of thrones and that the throne and sovereignty shall descend lineally from Raja Syed Putra. If none of the descendant of Raja Syed Putra is alive to inherit the throne, then the throne shall be pass on to the descendants of Almarhum Tuan Syed Safi, Tuan Syed Ahmad or Tuan Syed Hussein in this order.

==== Chapter 1 – Council of Succession ====
This chapter contains nine articles; article 10 to 18. It addresses the functions of Council of Succession (Majlis Mesyuarat Mengangkat Raja), the appointment of its members, and rules regarding the council's proceedings.

==== Chapter 2 – The Sovereign ====
The chapter contains ten articles; article 19 to 27. It pertains to the Raja of Perlis, including the qualifications of becoming the Raja, powers of the regency, the process of appointing a regent and his representative in the Conference of Rulers and rules regarding the abdication of Raja.

==== Chapter 3 – The Sovereign's Consort ====
Chapter 3 contains only one article; article 28 that pertains to the appointment of Raja Perempuan as the Raja's consort.

==== Chapter 4 – The Heirs ====
Chapter 4 contains three articles; article 29 to 31. This chapter pertains to the Heirs of the Raja including Heir Apparent of Perlis or Raja Muda, including the styles and titles that he may use and his role in state affairs.

==== Chapter 5 – General ====
Chapter 5 contains four articles; article 32 to 35. This chapter pertains to the Raja's role as the fountain of honours and dignity. It addresses the Raja's powers in giving honours, the power to degrade any rank or title he had conferred, the power to appoint court and palace officers for ceremonial duties as well as prerogative powers.

=== Part IV ===
==== Chapter 1 – Executive ====
This chapter contains nine articles; article 36 to 43A. It pertains to executive authority power of the Raja, the process of appointment of Menteri Besar of Perlis, State Secretary, Legal Advisor, Financial Officer, and the members of Perlis State Executive Council and rules regarding the proceedings of the council.

==== Chapter 2 – Power of Pardon ====
This chapter contains only one article; article 44 which addresses the power of Raja to give pardon, reprieve or respite to convicted criminals that carries out crime in the state.

==== Chapter 3 – Capacity of the State ====
This chapter contains only one article; article 45 which addresses the capacity of the state to acquire, hold or dispose of property of any kind, and to sue or be sued.

==== Chapter 4 – The Legislature ====
This chapter contains twenty articles; article 46 to 65. It pertains to the Perlis State Legislative Assembly, its memberships, summoning, prorogation and dissolution, Speaker election, roles, and proceedings.

==== Chapter 5 - Finance ====
This chapter contains six articles; article 66 to 71. It addresses financial issues and the budget.

==== Chapter 6 - Special Position Relating to the Malays ====
This chapter contains only one article; article 72, which pertains to the special position of the Malays and the Raja's role of safeguarding it.

==== Chapter 7 - Impartial Treatment ====
This chapter contains only one article; article 73, which provides that there shall be impartial treatment towards any state employees regardless of their races.

==== Chapter 8 - General ====
This chapter contains three articles; article 74 to 76. Article 74 describes the state seal use by the state ruler. Article 75 describes the state's emblems and flags. Article 76 describes the state precedence list subject to the Federal Constitution.

==== Chapter 9 - Commencement ====
This chapter contains only one article; article 77, which states the effective date of the state constitution as the date of dissolution of the last council of State.

==== Chapter 10 - The Royal Prerogative ====
This chapter contains only one article; article 78 which states that constitution shall not affect the prerogatives, powers and jurisdiction of the ruler.

==== Chapter 11 - Transitional Provision ====
This chapter contains two articles; article 79 and 80, which respectively describes the temporary provision as to composition of the State Executive Council and the revocation of the Laws of the Constitution of Perlis formerly in force.
