= Merchantrade Asia =

Malaysian financial services company

Merchantrade Asia (Merchantrade) is a financial service company based in Malaysia. The company's business is centered on international money transfers, foreign currency exchange, wholesale banknotes, digital payment processing and mobile telecommunications. They also introduced microinsurance as part of their service offerings.

Merchantrade Asia operates 94 outlets, 5 main wholesale banknote trading hubs, more than 450 agent locations and 480 cash-in and cash-out merchants throughout Malaysia. Its institutional shareholders are Celcom Axiata Bhd, Kenanga Investment Bank and MCIS Insurance Berhad (MCIS Life).

== History ==
The company was founded in 1996 as a telecommunications equipment supplier in Malaysia.

In 2007, the company offered Merchantrade Mobile, which is a mobile virtual network operator (MVNO) with Celcom Axiata Berhad. It also offered Merchantrade Express Remittances. In 2009, the company obtained an investment from Sumitomo Corporation. It obtained a Class A money services business license in 2012. It later created a mobile remittance platform, Merchantrade Doowit.

It obtained an investment from Celcom Axiata Berhad in 2014. Later, it acquired a 100% stake in Vital Rate Sdn. Bhd., currency exchange outlets in Pavilion, Suria KLCC and KL Sentral, and a 49% stake in Kliq Pte, later 100%. It formed a joint venture with Jetixa (Dubai) in 2017 and a partnership for global money transfer network service with Western Union in 2019. In 2020, it acquired a 100% stake in Malaysian mobile financial services business Valyou Sdn. Bhd. Subsequently, it increased its outlets to 101 locations in Malaysia. It also obtained an investment from Kenanga Investment Bank. The partners were to offer Kenanga Money eWallet

The company formed partnerships with IDEMIA for Digital Onboarding and LintraMax. The MVNO service was moved to its wholly owned subsidiary, Valyou Sdn Bhd (Valyou).

== Awards ==
- 2019 – Received RemTECH Award.
- 2019 – Awarded as Visa's Most Outstanding Launch - Innovation Products Award and also received a Malaysia Technology Excellence Award.

== Services ==
The company offers international remittance services, currency exchange and wholesale banknote services as part of its money services business segment. The company is also a member of the Malaysian Association of Money Services Business (MAMSB) and the International Association of Money Transfer Networks (IAMTN). Merchantrade also offers retail and online currency exchange services. Some of the key outlets are located in Suria KLCC and Imago, Kota Kinabalu.

The company offered a non-bank issuer of a multi-currency e-wallet with a VISA-accepted prepaid card in Malaysia. The e-wallet is able to exchange directly into 20 foreign currencies and make payments directly with the card.

Its MVNO, through a partnership with Celcom Axiata, offered international mobile direct dial (IDD) 4G LTE mobile internet and international airtime credit transfer.
