= Syed Zainol Anwar Jamalullail =

- Tengku Syarif Panglima of Perlis
- Born: Syed Zainol Anwar ibni Syed Putra Jamalullail; 23 February 1952 (age 74); Federation of Malaya (now Malaysia)
- Spouse: Tengku Puan Panglima Perlis; YAM Tengku Puteri Nor Zehan binti Almarhum Sultan Salahuddin Abdul Aziz Shah Al-Haj
- Issue: Syed Haizam Hishamuddin Putra Engku Panglima Setia Di-Raja of Selangor; Syed Jufri Ziauddin Putra; Sharifah Eliza Cornelia Putri
Names
- Syed Zainol Anwar ibni Syed Putra Jamalullail
- House: Jamalullail
- Father: Tuanku Syed Putra Ibni Almarhum Tuan Syed Hassan Jamalullail
- Mother: Tengku Budriah Binti Almarhum Tengku Ismail
- Religion: Sunni Islam

Syed Zainol Anwar ibni Syed Putra Jamalullail (born 23 February 1952), better known as Syed Anwar Jamalullail is a Malaysian corporate figure and member of Perlis royal family. He is a younger brother of the current Raja of Perlis, Tuanku Syed Sirajuddin and the brother-in-law of the current Sultan of Selangor, Sultan Sharafuddin Idris Shah Al-Haj.

== Early life and education ==
Syed Zainol Anwar was born on 23 February 1952. He is the youngest son of the third Yang di-Pertuan Agong (King) of Malaysia and the sixth Raja of Perlis, Tuanku Syed Putra by his first wife, Raja Perempuan Budriah.

He holds a Bachelor of Arts degree in Accounting from Macquarie University in Sydney, Australia. He is a qualified Chartered Accountant, having qualified in 1974. He is also a Chartered Accountant, a Certified Practising Accountant (Australia) and a member of the Malaysian Institute of Accountants.

== Career ==
Syed Zainol Anwar began his career with Malaysia Airlines in 1975 as a Financial Accountant, before moving on to hold executive senior positions in various companies. His last position was as the Group Managing Director of Amanah Capital Partners Berhad.

He was formerly the Chairman of the Lembaga Tabung Haji Investment Panel, Cahaya Mata Sarawak Berhad, Malaysian Airport Holdings Berhad, Media Prima Berhad, Malaysian Resources Corporation Berhad, DRB-Hicom Berhad, Malakoff Corporation Berhad, EON Bank Berhad, Uni Asia Life Assurance Berhad, Uni Asia General Insurance Berhad, Radicare (M) Sdn Bhd, Realmild (M) Sdn Bhd and Nestle (Malaysia) Berhad. He was also an Independent Director of Maxis Communications Berhad and Bangkok Bank Berhad, and the Group Managing Director of Amanah Capital Partners Berhad.

Currently, he is the Chairman of SP Setia Berhad, Kenanga Investment Bank Berhad and Lembaga Zakat Selangor. He is also the Chancellor of SEGi University.

== Personal life ==
On 7 April 1979, Syed Zainol Anwar married Tengku Puteri Nor Zehan, the youngest daughter of the then Sultan of Selangor, Sultan Salahuddin Abdul Aziz Shah. They have three children: Syed Haizam Hishamuddin Putra, Syed Jufri Ziauddin Putra and Sharifah Eliza Cornelia Putri.

== Honours ==
He has been awarded:

=== Honours of Perlis ===
- Perlis
  - Knight Grand Companion of the Order of the Gallant Prince Syed Putra Jamalullail (SSPJ) – Dato' Seri Diraja (1999)
  - Knight Grand Commander of the Order of the Crown of Perlis (SPMP) – Dato' Seri (1995)

=== Honours of Malaysia ===
- Malaysia
  - Commander of the Order of Loyalty to the Crown of Malaysia (PSM) – Tan Sri (2006)
- Selangor
  - Second Class of the Royal Family Order of Selangor (DK II) (2015)
  - Knight Grand Companion of the Order of Sultan Sharafuddin Idris Shah (SSIS) – Dato' Setia (2003)
