= 1998 Arau by-election =

Election in Malaysia

← 1995	4 July 1998	1999 →

Arau seat in the Dewan Rakyat
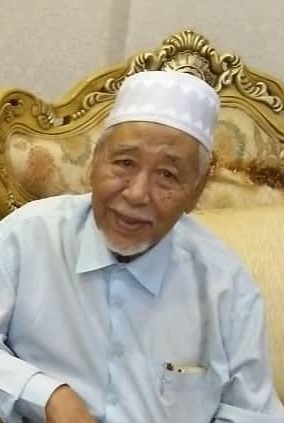
		BN
Candidate	Hashim Jasin	Ismail Kassim
Party	PAS	BN (UMNO)
Popular vote	12,864	11,541
Percentage	52.71%	47.29%
Arau MP before election
Kamaruddin Ahmad
BN (UMNO)
Elected Arau MP
Hashim Jasin
PAS

The 1998 Arau by-election is a by-election for the Dewan Rakyat federal seat of Arau, Malaysia that were held on 4 July 1998. It was called following the death of the incumbent, Kamaruddin Ahmad on 25 May 1998.

== Background ==
Kamaruddin Ahmad were elected to the Parliament of Malaysia federal seat of Arau at the 1995 Malaysian general election, winning the seat as a Barisan Nasional (BN) candidate. He also were a member of Perlis State Legislative Assembly for Sanglang from 1978 until 1986.

On 25 May 1998, Kamaruddin died at Kangar Hospital, after being rushed there by his wife following a stroke attack while he were playing badminton. His death means that his Arau federal seat were vacated, and necessitates for by-election to be held, as the seat were vacated more that 2 years before the expiry of Malaysian parliament current terms. Election Commission of Malaysia announced on 3 June 1998 that the by-election for the seat will be held on 4 July 1998, with 24 June 1998 set as the nomination day.

== Nomination and campaign ==
After nomination closed, it was confirmed that BN will face Pan-Malaysian Islamic Party (PAS) in a straight fight for the Arau seat. BN nominated Ismail Kassim, the United Malays National Organization (UMNO) Arau division Youth chief, and the younger brother or Perlis Menteri Besar and Perlis UMNO and BN chief Shahidan Kassim, who announced Ismail's candidacy. PAS meanwhile nominated Hashim Jasin, the party's Perlis state commissioner.

Observers such as New Straits Times columnist A. Rahman Osman saw BN will win the by-election convincingly, and PAS can only hope to reduce the majority votes, as no other parties other than BN or its predecessor Alliance won the parliamentary seat in Perlis.

== Timeline ==
The key dates are listed below.

Date	Event
	Issue of the Writ of Election
24 June 1998	Nomination Day
24 June - 3 July 1998	Campaigning Period
	Early polling day for postal and overseas voters
4 July 1998	Polling Day

== Results ==
Malaysian general by-election, 4 July 1998: Arau Upon the death of incumbent, Kamarudin Ahmad
Party	Candidate	Votes	%	∆%
PAS	Hashim Jasin	12,864	52.71	▲52.71
BN	Ismail Kassim	11,541	47.29	▼16.24
Total valid votes		24,405	100.00	
Total rejected ballots		344		
Unreturned ballots		0		
Turnout		24,749	70.27	▼6.24
Registered electors		35,221		
Majority		1,323	5.42	▼21.64
PAS gain from BN		Swing		?

=== Previous result ===
Malaysian general election, 1995: Arau
Party	Candidate	Votes	%	∆%
BN	Kamarudin Ahmad	16,266	63.53	▲2.10
S46	Saad @ Md. Zain Hamzah	9,337	36.47	▲36.47
Total valid votes		25,603	100.00	
Total rejected ballots		891		
Unreturned ballots		30		
Turnout		26,524	76.51	▼0.91
Registered electors		34,667		
Majority		6,929	27.06	▲4.20
BN hold		Swing		

== Aftermath ==
Hashim did not defend the seat in the general election the next year; and BN won back the seat defeating another PAS candidate.

A retrospective view in 2018 by political analyst Md Shukri Shuib opines that Hashim's win in the by-election were 'lucky', and aided by BN's election machinery weakness and the people's view of the government way of tackling the 1997 Asian financial crisis in the country.
