= Kenanga =

Malaysian financial services company

Kenanga Investment Bank Berhad
- Company type: Public limited company
- Traded as: MYX: 6483
- ISIN: MYL6483OO001
- Industry: Financial services
- Founded: 1973; 53 years ago as K & N Kenanga Sdn Bhd
- Founder: YM Tengku Noor Zakiah binti Almarhum Tengku Ismail; Tuan Kamaruddin Taha
- Headquarters: Kenanga Tower; 237 Jalan Tun Razak, Kuala Lumpur, Malaysia
- Key people: YAM Tan Sri Dato’ Seri Syed Zainol Anwar ibni Almarhum Tuanku Syed Putra Jamalullail (Chairman); Datuk Chay Wai Leong (Group Managing Director); YM Tengku Noor Zakiah binti Almarhum Tengku Ismail (Founder & Adviser)
- Services: Stockbroking; Investment banking; Investment management
- Revenue: ▲RM1.0 billion (2024)
- Net income: ▲RM95.8 million (2024)
- Total assets: ▲RM23.5 billion (2024)
- Total equity: ▲RM1.12 billion (2024)
- Website: www.kenanga.com.my

Kenanga Investment Bank Berhad (Kenanga IB) is a Malaysian financial services company which provides investment banking, stockbroking and investment management services.

The company was founded in 1973 by YAM Tengku Noor Zakiah binti Almarhum Tengku Ismail, the first Bumiputera female stockbroker in Malaysia, with her business partner Tuan Kamaruddin Taha, and is one of the first stockbroking houses in Malaysia. It was listed on the Kuala Lumpur Stock Exchange in 1996. In 2012, Kenanga IB acquired ECM Libra's investment banking and stockbroking business. The group further expanded by purchasing ING Group's local fund management unit in 2014.

Significant stakes in the company have changed hands throughout its history. It received a 30% equity investment from the U.S. financial group John Hancock in 1989. John Hancock sold its holding to Deutsche Bank in 1991. Deutsche remained a significant shareholder until 2015 to when it disposed part of its interest to Tokai Tokyo. Through a series of merger transactions in 2001, the company's largest shareholder (with a 21 percent interest) is the Cahya Mata Sarawak, an investment holding company linked to the family of former Sarawak chief minister Abdul Taib Mahmud.

In May 2017, Kenanga IB launched Rakuten Trade, a joint venture with Japan's Rakuten Securities, Inc. Rakuten Trade is Malaysia's first full-fledged online stockbroker. In May 2020, Rakuten Trade turned a profit for the first time, after handling more than RM12.5 billion in stocks traded on Bursa Malaysia in three years.

In February 2021, Kenanga IB acquired a 19% stake in cryptocurrency exchange operator Tokenize.
