= Sanglang (state constituency) =

Electoral district in Perlis, Malaysia

Sanglang (N15)
Perlis constituency

State constituency
- Legislature: Perlis State Legislative Assembly
MLA
Mohd Shukri Ramli
PN
- Constituency created: 1958
- First contested: 1959
- Last contested: 2022

Demographics
- Population (2020): 10,249
- Electors (2022): 10,421

Sanglang is a state constituency in Perlis, Malaysia, that has been represented in the Perlis State Legislative Assembly.

The state constituency was created in 1958. It was first contested in 1959 and is mandated to return a single Assemblyman to the Perlis State Legislative Assembly under the first-past-the-post voting system. Since 2013, the State Assemblyman for Sanglang is Mohd Shukri Ramli from Parti Islam Se-Malaysia (PAS).

== Definition ==
=== Polling districts ===
According to the federal gazette issued on 31 October 2022, the Sanglang constituency is divided into 7 polling districts.

State constituency	Polling Districts	Code	Location
Sanglang (N15)	Bongor Kudong	003/15/01	Dewan 1 Malaysia Simpang Empat
Sanglang (N15)	Bunga Mas	003/15/02	SMK Syed Saffi
Sanglang (N15)	Sungai Padang	003/15/03	SK Dato Ahmad Musa
Sanglang (N15)	Simpang Sanglang	003/15/04	SK Sanglang
Sanglang (N15)	Padang Keria	003/15/05	SK Padang Keria
Sanglang (N15)	Kuala Sanglang	003/15/06	SJK (C) Chin Hun
Sanglang (N15)	Tok Pulau	003/15/07	SMK Sanglang

== Demographics ==
Ethnic breakdown of Sanglang's electorate as of 2022
1. Malay (92.5%)
2. Chinese (6.79%)
3. Other ethnicities (0.49%)
4. Indian (0.17%)

Total electors by polling district in 2016
Polling district	Electors
Bongor Kudong	973
Bunga Mas	1,355
Sungai Padang	1,266
Simpang Sanglang	980
Padang Keria	836
Kuala Sanglang	1,153
Tok Pulau	1,683
Total	8,246
Source: Malaysian Election Commission

== History ==
Members of the Legislative Assembly for Sanglang
Assembly	No	Years	Member	Party
Constituency created
1st	N12	1959–1964	Ahmad Musa	Alliance (UMNO)
2nd	N12	1964–1969	Ahmad Musa	Alliance (UMNO)
		1969–1971	Assembly dissolved	
3rd	N12	1971–1973	Jaafar Hassan	Alliance (UMNO)
3rd	N12	1973–1974	Jaafar Hassan	BN (UMNO)
4th	N12	1974–1978	Ahmad Long	BN (UMNO)
5th	N12	1978–1982	Saad @ Md Zain Hamzah	BN (UMNO)
6th	N12	1982–1986	Saad @ Md Zain Hamzah	BN (UMNO)
7th	N14	1986–1990	Kamarudin Ahmad	BN (UMNO)
8th	N14	1990–1995	Kamarudin Ahmad	BN (UMNO)
9th	N15	1995–1999	Karim Salleh	BN (UMNO)
10th	N15	1999–2004	Hashim Jasin	PAS
11th	N15	2004–2008	Hashim Jasin	PAS
12th	N15	2008	Abdullah Hassan	BN (UMNO)
12th	N15	2008–2013	Hashim Jasin	PR (PAS)
13th	N15	2013–2018	Mohd. Shukri Ramli	PR (PAS)
14th	N15	2018–2020	Mohd. Shukri Ramli	PAS
14th	N15	2020–2022	Mohd. Shukri Ramli	PN (PAS)
15th	N15	2022–present	Mohd. Shukri Ramli	PN (PAS)

== Election results ==
Perlis state election, 2022
Party	Candidate	Votes	%	∆%
PN	Mohd Shukri Ramli	5,111	62.13	▲62.13
BN	Sharifudin Ahmad	1,776	21.59	▼18.65
PH	Ahmad Fadhzil Mohamad	931	11.32	▲11.32
Heritage	Zainuddin Yom	408	4.96	▲4.96
Total valid votes		8,226	100.00	
Total rejected ballots		138		
Unreturned ballots		13		
Turnout		8,377	80.40	▼5.02
Registered electors		10,421		
Majority		3,335	40.54	▲39.96
PN hold		Swing		

Perlis state election, 2018
Party	Candidate	Votes	%	∆%
PAS	Mohd Shukri Ramli	2,971	40.82	▼8.49
BN	Che Zaidi Saidin	2,929	40.24	▼7.43
PKR	Zolkharnain Abidin	1,379	18.94	▲18.94
Total valid votes		7,279	100.00	
Total rejected ballots		116		
Unreturned ballots		13		
Turnout		7,408	85.42	▼3.79
Registered electors		8,672		
Majority		42	0.58	▼1.06
PAS hold		Swing		

Perlis state election, 2013
Party	Candidate	Votes	%	∆%
PAS	Mohd Shukri Ramli	3,632	49.31	▼1.05
BN	Fathul Bari Mat Jahya	3,511	47.67	▼1.97
Independent	Zainudin Yom	222	3.01	▲3.01
Total valid votes		7,365	100.00	
Total rejected ballots		80		
Unreturned ballots		14		
Turnout		7,459	89.21	▲4.61
Registered electors		8,361		
Majority		121	1.64	▲0.92
PAS hold		Swing		
Source(s) "Federal Government Gazette - Notice of Contested Election, State Legislative Assembly for the State of Perlis [P.U. (B) 185/2013]" (PDF). Attorney General's Chambers of Malaysia. 26 April 2013. "Federal Government Gazette - Results of Contested Election and Statements of the Poll after the Official Addition of Votes, State Constituencies for the State of Perlis [P.U. (B) 226/2013]" (PDF). Attorney General's Chambers of Malaysia. 22 May 2013.

Perlis state election, 2008
Party	Candidate	Votes	%	∆%
Initially, the Returning Officer had declared Abdullah Hassan as the elected representative for Sanglang at the night of 8 March 2008. However, Hashim Jasin filed his petition to nullify the election due to inconsistent figure in the vote counting documents. The Federal Court had made such a controversial decision to declare Hashim Jasin as the rightful winner on 16 September 2008. No by-election was held by the Election Commission of Malaysia.
PAS	Hashim Jasin	3,333	50.36	▲0.01
BN	Abdullah Hassan	3,286	49.64	▼0.01
Total valid votes		6,619	100.00	
Total rejected ballots		92		
Unreturned ballots		11		
Turnout		6,722	84.60	▲1.38
Registered electors		7,946		
Majority		149	0.72	▲0.02
PAS hold		Swing		

Perlis state election, 2004
Party	Candidate	Votes	%	∆%
PAS	Hashim Jasin	3,221	50.35	▼2.35
BN	Mastika Junaidah Husin	3,176	49.65	▲2.35
Total valid votes		6,397	100.00	
Total rejected ballots		11		
Unreturned ballots				
Turnout		6,408	83.22	▲1.79
Registered electors		7,700		
Majority		45	0.70	▼4.70
PAS hold		Swing		

Perlis state election, 1999
Party	Candidate	Votes	%	∆%
PAS	Hashim Jasin	3,245	52.70	▲4.95
BN	Ramlah Long	2,912	47.30	▼4.95
Total valid votes		6,157	100.00	
Total rejected ballots		87		
Unreturned ballots		2		
Turnout		6,246	81.43	▲3.79
Registered electors		7,670		
Majority		333	5.40	▲0.90
PAS gain from BN		Swing		?

Perlis state election, 1995
Party	Candidate	Votes	%	∆%
BN	Karim Salleh	2,860	52.25	▲0.99
PAS	Hashim Jasin	2,614	47.75	▼0.99
Total valid votes		5,474	100.00	
Total rejected ballots		84		
Unreturned ballots		2		
Turnout		5,560	77.64	▼1.24
Registered electors		7,161		
Majority		246	4.50	▲1.98
BN hold		Swing		

Perlis state election, 1990
Party	Candidate	Votes	%	∆%
BN	Kamarudin Ahmad	2,777	51.26	▼2.94
PAS	Ishak Ismail	2,640	48.74	▲2.94
Total valid votes		5,417	100.00	
Total rejected ballots		199		
Unreturned ballots		0		
Turnout		5,616	78.88	▲0.72
Registered electors		7,120		
Majority		137	2.52	▼5.88
BN hold		Swing		

Perlis state election, 1986
Party	Candidate	Votes	%	∆%
BN	Kamarudin Ahmad	2,612	54.20	▼1.00
PAS	Ishak Ismail	2,207	45.80	▲1.00
Total valid votes		4,819	100.00	
Total rejected ballots		173		
Unreturned ballots		0		
Turnout		4,992	78.16	▼2.22
Registered electors		6,387		
Majority		405	8.40	▼2.00
BN hold		Swing		

Perlis state election, 1982
Party	Candidate	Votes	%	∆%
BN	Saad @ Md Zain Hamzah	2,477	55.20	▼3.93
PAS	Harun Othman	2,010	44.80	▲44.80
Total valid votes		4,487	100.00	
Total rejected ballots		241		
Unreturned ballots		0		
Turnout		4,728	80.38	
Registered electors		5,882		
Majority		467	10.40	▼7.86
BN hold		Swing		

Perlis state election, 1978
Party	Candidate	Votes	%	∆%
BN	Saad @ Md Zain Hamzah	2,303	59.13	▲2.01
Independent	Ahmad Puteh	1,592	40.87	▲40.87
Total valid votes		3,895	100.00	
Total rejected ballots		320		
Unreturned ballots		0		
Turnout		4,215	78.26	▼2.60
Registered electors		5,386		
Majority		711	18.25	▲4.01
BN hold		Swing		

Perlis state election, 1974
Party	Candidate	Votes	%	∆%
BN	Ahmad Long	2,109	57.12	▲57.12
Independent	Abu Bakar Hamzah	1,583	42.88	▲42.88
Total valid votes		3,692	100.00	
Total rejected ballots		282		
Unreturned ballots		0		
Turnout		3,974	82.59	▼2.80
Registered electors		4,812		
Majority		526	14.24	▲14.12
BN hold		Swing		

Perlis state election, 1969
Party	Candidate	Votes	%	∆%
Alliance	Jaafar Hassan	1,973	50.06	▼3.71
PMIP	Abu Bakar Hamzah	1,968	49.94	▲3.71
Total valid votes		3,941	100.00	
Total rejected ballots		138		
Unreturned ballots		0		
Turnout		4,079	85.39	▲1.54
Registered electors		4,777		
Majority		5	0.12	▼7.42
Alliance hold		Swing		

Perlis state election, 1964
Party	Candidate	Votes	%	∆%
Alliance	Ahmad Musa	1,776	53.77	▼2.67
PMIP	Ghazali Husain	1,527	46.23	▲2.67
Total valid votes		3,303	100.00	
Total rejected ballots		156		
Unreturned ballots		0		
Turnout		3,459	83.85	▲2.98
Registered electors		4,125		
Majority		249	7.54	▼5.34
Alliance hold		Swing		

Perlis state election, 1959
Party	Candidate	Votes	%
Alliance	Ahmad Musa	1,577	56.44
PMIP	Adnan Abdullah	1,217	43.56
Total valid votes		2,794	100.00
Total rejected ballots		34	
Unreturned ballots		0	
Turnout		2,828	80.87
Registered electors		3,497	
Majority		360	12.88
This was a new constituency created.
