= Tuanku Syed Faizuddin Putra Jamalullail =

Crown Prince of Perlis (born 1967)

Tuanku Syed Faizuddin Putra توانكو سيد فائز الدين ڤوترا
- Raja Muda of Perlis

Crown Prince of Perlis
- Reign: 1 August 2000 – present
- Proclamation: 12 October 2000
- Predecessor: Tuanku Syed Sirajuddin
- Born: 30 December 1967 (age 58); Hospital Besar Alor Setar, Alor Setar, Kedah, Malaysia
- Spouse: Tuanku Lailatul Shahreen Akashah (m. 1994)
- Issue: Sharifah Khatreena Nuraniah; Sharifah Farah Adriana; Syed Sirajuddin Areeb Putra
Names
- Tuanku Syed Faizuddin Putra ibni Tuanku Syed Sirajuddin Jamalullail
- House: Jamalullail
- Father: Tuanku Syed Sirajuddin
- Mother: Tuanku Fauziah Tengku Abdul Rashid
- Religion: Sunni Islam

Tuanku Syed Faizuddin Putra ibni Tuanku Syed Sirajuddin Jamalullail (Jawi: توانكو سيد فائز الدين ڤوترا ابن توانكو سيد سراج الدين جمل الليل; born 30 December 1967 in Alor Setar, Kedah, Malaysia) is the Raja Muda (Crown Prince) of Perlis and heir apparent to the Perlis throne. He is the only son of the Raja of Perlis, Tuanku Syed Sirajuddin.

== Biography ==
Tuanku Syed Faizuddin Putra was born on 30 December 1967 at Hospital Besar Alor Setar in Alor Setar, Kedah. He is the eldest child and only son of Tuanku Syed Sirajuddin Jamalullail and Tuanku Tengku Fauziah Tengku Abdul Rashid.

He attended SRK Putra (Primary, Standards 1–6) and SMK Derma (Secondary, Forms 1–3) in Kangar before moving to Penang Free School in George Town, Penang (Secondary, Form 4) and later he attended Carey Grammar School in Melbourne, Australia (Secondary, Forms 5–6).

He obtained his Bachelor of Economics from La Trobe University in Bundoora, Melbourne in 1989.

In 1990, Tuanku Syed Faizuddin Putra joined Malaysia Airlines in Kuala Lumpur as a Management Trainee and was given exposures at the General Management department, Flight Control Centre, MAS Hotels and Boutiques as well as Passenger Sales Department. From 1992 to 1995, he was International Sales and Marketing Executive for Australasia, Europe, Middle-East and Indian Sub-Continent before moving to the International Sales and Marketing Executive for Asia and Africa Region. Both positions being based at the head office in Jalan Sultan Ismail MAS Building.

He became Area Manager for Spain, Portugal and Northern Africa based in Madrid from 1995 to 1997 and later Area Manager for Switzerland, Austria and Central Europe based in Zurich from 1997 to 2002. He was installed as the Raja Muda (Crown Prince) of Perlis at the Istana Arau on 12 October 2000. He served as the Regent of Perlis from December 2001 to December 2006 during his father's tenure as the 12th Yang di-Pertuan Agong.

Tuanku Syed Faizuddin Putra has taken an active role in championing Malay and Muslim issues. He is the President of the Perlis Islamic Religious and Malay Customs Council.

Tuanku Syed Faizuddin Putra is also the Chancellor of Universiti Malaysia Perlis, Commander of 504th Regiment of The Malaysian Territorial Army / (Askar Wataniah - Reservist) (holding the rank of Brigadier General) and the Chairman of the Perlis Tuanku Syed Putra Foundation. He is also the President of Putra Golf Club in Perlis. On 14 April 2015, he was proclaimed as the first Chancellor of Kolej Universiti Islam Perlis.

=== Hobbies ===
- He travels extensively around the world.
- He is an avid sportsman and still plays association football, cycling and woodball regularly.
- He is also The Patron of The Malaysian Manchester United Football Club Supporters Club.

== Marriage and children ==
Tuanku Syed Faizuddin Putra married Tuanku Lailatul Shahreen Akashah on 9 May 1994 in Kuala Lumpur. In 2000, he was appointed Raja Muda (Crown Prince) of Perlis. With the appointment, Tuanku Lailatul Shahreen Akashah became the Raja Puan Muda (Crown Princess) of Perlis. The couple has three children:

- Sharifah Khatreena Nuraniah (born 10 February 1995 at the Pantai Hospital in Kuala Lumpur).
- Sharifah Farah Adriana (born 4 March 2001 at Zollikerberg Hospital, Zurich, Switzerland).
- Syed Sirajuddin Areeb Putra (born 12 April 2009 at Tuanku Fauziah Hospital (HTF), Kangar).

== Styles and honours ==
Styles of Tuanku Syed Faizuddin Putra
- Reference style: His Highness
- Spoken style: Your Highness
- Alternative style: Tuanku

- Perlis
  - Recipient of the Perlis Family Order of the Gallant Prince Syed Putra Jamalullail (DK) (12 December 2001)
  - Knight Grand Companion of the Order of the Gallant Prince Syed Sirajuddin Jamalullail (SSSJ) – Dato' Seri Diraja (17 May 2026)
  - Knight Grand Commander of the Order of the Crown of Perlis (SPMP) – Dato' Seri (17 May 1998)
- Malaysian Armed Forces
  - Warrior of the Order of Military Service of Malaysia (PAT) (2010)

Other awards/honours received:

- Royal Malaysian Police (PDRM) Honorary insignia for Sniper and Bomb Specialist squad (2012).
- Royal Malaysian police (PDRM) Honorary Special Unit Force Para Wing (2010).
- Malaysian Scouts Royal Award (2009).
- Honorary insignia Wing from the Malaysian Army 8th Brigade Maroon Beret Paratrooper (2004).

From abroad:

- Honoris Causa, Doctor in Education. La Trobe University, Melbourne, Australia. (2010).
- Honorary Doctorate in Management Sciences, Yala Rajabhat University, Thailand.
- Distinguished Alumni, La Trobe University, Melbourne, Australia.
- Honorary Wing of The Special Warfare Command of The Royal Thai Army Paratrooper (2010).

Malaysian royalty
First heir apparent	Raja Muda of Perlis; 1st position	Succeeded by Syed Sirajuddin Areeb Putra
