= Hashim Jasin =

Malaysian Islamic Party politician

Yang Berbahagia Dato' Hashim Jasin DPSJ SMP
- هاشم ياسين
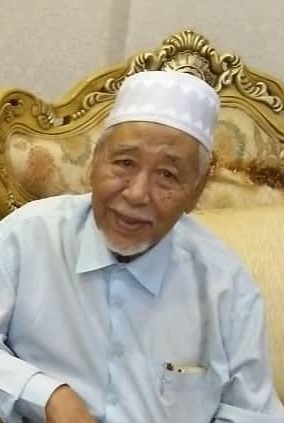
- Hashim in 2022

4th Spiritual Leader of Malaysian Islamic Party
- In office 10 October 2016 – 17 November 2026
- Preceded by: Haron Din
- Succeeded by: Ahmad Yakob

Faction represented in Dewan Rakyat
- 1998–1999: Malaysian Islamic Party

Faction represented in Perlis State Legislative Assembly
- 1999–2013: Malaysian Islamic Party

Personal details
- Born: Hashim bin Jasin; 1 August 1939 (age 87) Changkat Jawi, Arau, Perlis, Unfederated Malay States
- Citizenship: Malaysian
- Party: Malaysian Islamic Party (PAS)
- Other political affiliations: Barisan Alternatif (BA); Pakatan Rakyat (PR); Gagasan Sejahtera (GS); Muafakat Nasional (MN); Perikatan Nasional (PN)
- Education: University of Baghdad (BA)
- Occupation: Politician
- Profession: Religious teacher

Hashim bin Jasin (Jawi: هاشم بن ياسين; born 1 August 1939) is a Malaysian politician from the Malaysian Islamic Party (PAS), a component party of the Perikatan Nasional (PN) coalition. He has served as the 4th Spiritual Leader of PAS since October 2016 after the death of his predecessor Haron Din in September 2016 and its State Commissioner of Perlis from 1991 to 2013. Besides, he served as the Member of Parliament (MP) for Arau after his victory in the 1998 Arau by-elections until the 1999 general election in November 1999 and Member of the Perlis State Legislative Assembly (MLA) for Sanglang from November 1999 to the 2013 general election in May 2013.

== Early life and education ==
Hashim was born in Changkat Jawi, Perlis, Unfederated Malay States (now Malaysia). He attended Sekolah Melayu Jelampuk, Sekolah Alawiyah, Arau and University of Baghdad, Iraq studied bachelor's degree of Arabic literature and Islamic law.

== Political career ==
=== PAS stance on opposition pact ===
On 20 October 2016, Hashim emphasized that the Islamist party PAS will not collaborate with other political parties to topple the then Prime Minister Najib Razak’s government as this would not benefit him or the party. He mentioned that previous attempts in the past had proven failed. In the early 1990s, PAS joined forces with Parti Melayu Semangat 46 (S46) led by Tengku Razaleigh Hamzah, then teaming up with Democratic Action Party (DAP) & People's Justice Party (PKR) to form Barisan Alternatif (BA) in 1998 and subsequently Pakatan Rakyat (PR) in 2008. Hashim stressed that PAS would like to take charge of the opposition pact, rather than follow.

=== Better to be with Umno than with ‘anti-Islam’ DAP ===
On 6 February 2017, PAS top leader Hashim Jasin said the party will choose ‘oppressive’ Umno over ‘anti-Islam’ DAP anytime. He said PAS was cooperating with Umno and Barisan Nasional (BN) because the Malay-based party can still be relied on compared to other "anti-Islam" parties. He said PAS’ approach was in line with the "mature politics" advocated by Muhammad.

== Controversies and issues ==
In 2013, when Hashim Jasin was the then Perlis PAS commissioner, it was exposed that he owned a Porsche Cayman. He explained that the car was belongs to his son which was bought with approximate price RM100,000 from England using the approved permit which was reserved to him as a state assemblyman.

In 2016, Hashim Jasin said that PAS was unlikely to receive RM90 million, since he was driving a Proton Saga and lived in a home worth only RM60,000. He said that if PAS had RM100 million, he could have even built three swimming pools.

== Election results ==
Parliament of Malaysia
| Year | Constituency | Candidate | Votes | Pct | Opponent(s) | Votes | Pct | Ballots cast | Majority | Turnout |
|---|---|---|---|---|---|---|---|---|---|---|
| 1998 | P003 Arau | Hashim Jasin (PAS) | 12,864 | 52.71% | Ismail Kassim (UMNO) | 11,541 | 47.29% | 24,749 | 1,323 | 70.27% |

Perlis State Legislative Assembly
| Year | Constituency | Candidate | Votes | Pct | Opponent(s) | Votes | Pct | Ballots cast | Majority | Turnout |
|---|---|---|---|---|---|---|---|---|---|---|
| 1995 | N15 Sanglang | Hashim Jasin (PAS) | 2,860 | 52.25% | Karim Salleh (UMNO) | 2,614 | 47.75% | 5,560 | 246 | 77.64% |
| 1999 | N15 Sanglang | Hashim Jasin (PAS) | 3,245 | 52.70% | Karim Salleh (UMNO) | 2,912 | 47.30% | 6,246 | 333 | 81.43% |
| 2004 | N15 Sanglang | Hashim Jasin (PAS) | 3,221 | 50.35% | Mastika Junaidah Husin (UMNO) | 3,176 | 49.65% | 6,408 | 45 | 83.22% |
| 2008 | N15 Sanglang | Hashim Jasin (PAS) | 3,333 | 50.36% | Abdullah Hassan (UMNO) | 3,286 | 49.64% | 6,722 | 149 | 84.60% |

== Honours ==
- Perlis
  - Knight Commander of the Order of Syed Sirajuddin Jamalullail of Perlis (DPSJ) – Dato' (2018)
  - Companion of the Order of the Crown of Perlis (SMP) (2011)
