= Che Md Noor Mat Arshad =

15th Chief of the Malaysian Army (1995–1997)

Yang Berbahagia General (Rtd) Tan Sri Che Md Noor Mat Arshad PGAT PSM SPMP SIMP SPMT SPTS DPMP DSPN PAT JMN SMP KMN AMP PPA PPM PJM PM
- چئ مد نور مت ارصد

15th Chief of Army
- In office 3 February 1995 – 31 May 1997
- Monarch: Ja'afar
- Prime Minister: Mahathir Mohamad
- Minister of Defence: Najib Razak (1995); Syed Hamid Albar (1995–1997)
- Preceded by: Ismail Omar
- Succeeded by: Ismail Hassan

Personal details
- Born: 6 January 1943 Paya, Kangar, Perlis, Japanese occupation of Malaya
- Died: 23 July 2019 (aged 76) Subang Jaya Medical Centre, Selangor, Malaysia
- Spouse: Che Maznah Che Mahamod
- Children: 3
- Education: Federation Military College, Sungai Besi; Lancaster University

Military service
- Allegiance: Malaysia
- Branch/service: Malaysian Army
- Years of service: 1963–1997
- Rank: General
- Unit: Royal Malay Regiment
- Battles/wars: Indonesia–Malaysia confrontation; Second Malayan Emergency

Che Md Noor bin Mat Arshad (Jawi: چئ مد نور بن مت ارصد; 6 January 1943 – 23 July 2019), was a Malaysian military officer who served as the 15th Chief of Malaysian Army from February 1995 to May 1997.

== Early life and education ==
Che Mohd Noor was born on 6 January 1943 in Paya, Perlis. He received his secondary education at Federation Military College, Sungai Besi and then he undergo officer cadet course at the same institution and completed at 1963. He also graduated with a Master in International Relations and Strategic Studies from Lancaster University.

== Military career ==
Che Mohd Noor was commissioned to Junior lieutenant on 6 December 1963 and posted at 3rd Battalion, Royal Malay Regiment. Throughout his military career, he has served in various positions, including staff officer at Training Planning Division, Ministry of Defence, special staff officer to Chief of Defence Forces, commanding officer of 19th Battalion, Royal Malay Regiment, assistant to the chief of Army, chief secretary of Joint Service Staff Division, division chief of Strategic Planning and then assistant chief of staff for Defence Planning at Malaysian Armed Forces headquarters.

On 11 April 1992, he was promoted to major general and he took charge of the 3rd Infantry Division before he appointed as deputy chief of Army and get rank promotion to lieutenant general on 2 March 1994. On 3 February 1995, Che Mohd Noor appointed as 15th Chief of Army following appointment his predecessor Ismail Omar as the 13th Chief of Defence Forces. The position he held until his retirement on 31 May 1997 and succeeded by Ismail Hassan.

== Personal life ==
=== Family ===
Che Mohd Noor married Che Maznah binti Che Mahamod and blessed with two sons and one daughter.

=== Death ===
Che Mohd Noor died at around 2:15 pm on 23 July 2019 at Subang Jaya Medical Centre after battling with metastasis cancer. He was buried at Royal Malay Regiment Burial Complex, Sungai Besi at the same day.

== Honours ==
=== Honours of Malaysia ===
- Malaysia
  - Commander of the Order of Loyalty to the Crown of Malaysia (PSM) – Tan Sri (2011)
  - Companion of the Order of the Defender of the Realm (JMN) (1994)
  - Officer of the Order of the Defender of the Realm (KMN) (1982)
  - Recipient of the General Service Medal (PPA)
  - Recipient of the Malaysian Commemorative Medal (Bronze) (PPM (G))
  - Recipient of the 10th Yang di-Pertuan Agong Installation Medal
- Malaysian Armed Forces
  - Courageous Commander of the Most Gallant Order of Military Service (PGAT)
  - Warrior of the Most Gallant Order of Military Service (PAT)
  - Recipient of the Malaysian Service Medal (PJM)
- Pahang
  - Knight Grand Companion of the Order of the Crown of Pahang (SIMP) – formerly Dato', now Dato' Indera (1996)
- Penang
  - Officer of the Order of the Defender of State (DSPN) – Dato' (1991)
- Perak
  - Knight Grand Commander of the Order of Taming Sari (SPTS) – Dato' Seri Panglima (1996)
- Perlis
  - Knight Grand Commander of the Order of the Crown of Perlis (SPMP) – Dato' Seri (1996)
  - Knight Commander of the Order of the Crown of Perlis (DPMP) – Dato' (1994)
  - Companion of the Order of the Crown of Perlis (SMP) (1988)
  - Member of the Order of the Crown of Perlis (AMP)
- Terengganu
  - Knight Grand Commander of the Order of the Crown of Terengganu (SPMT) – Dato' (1997)

=== Foreign honours ===
- Indonesia
  - First class (Utama) of the Star of Kartika Eka Paksi
- South Korea
  - First class (Tong-il Medal) of the Order of National Security Merit
- Thailand
  - Knight Grand Cross of the Order of the Crown of Thailand (PM) (1997)
