= Perlis State Mosque =

Mosque in Arau, Perlis, Malaysia

- Masjid Negeri Perlis
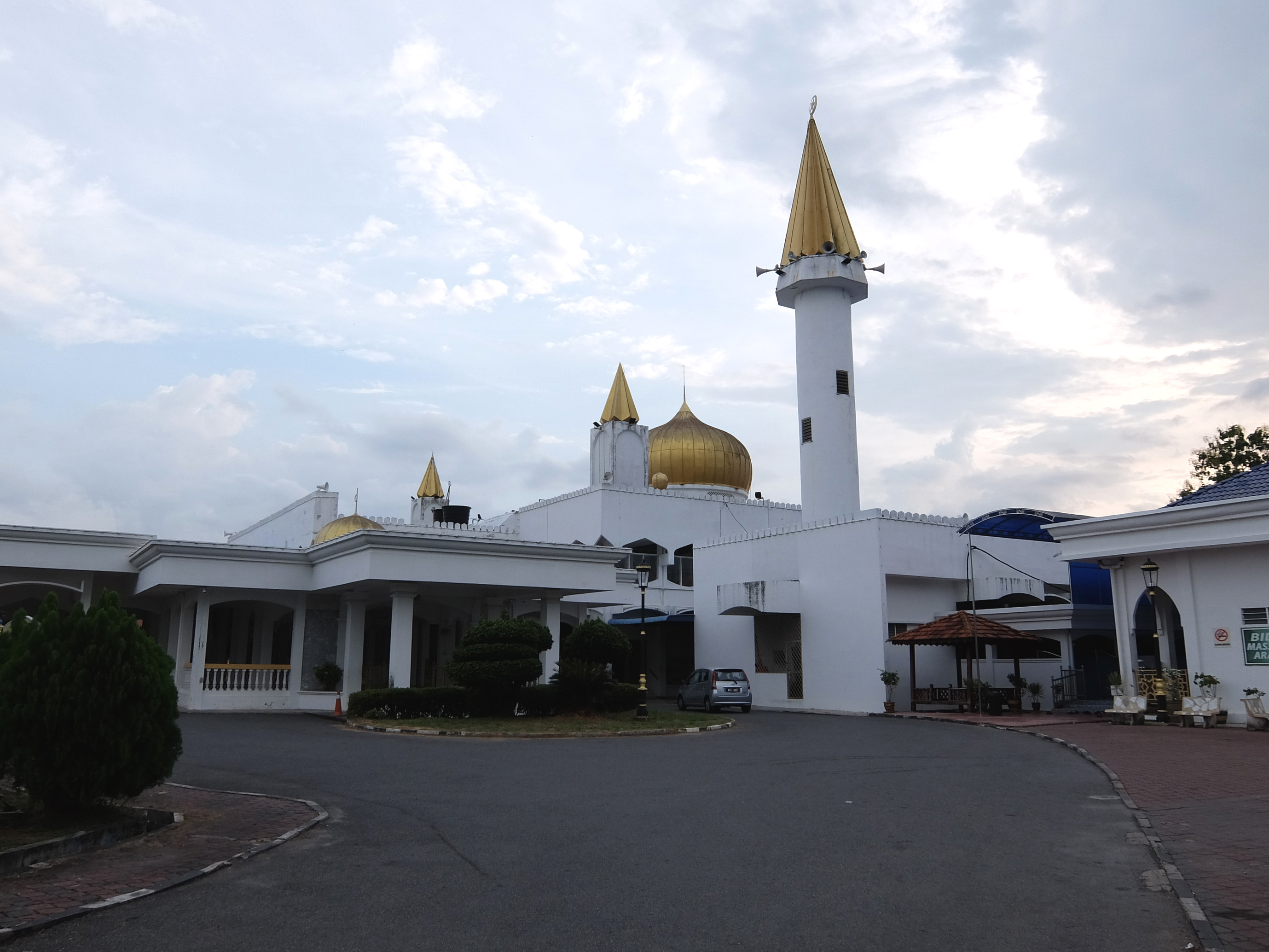

- Location of the mosque in Perlis

Religion
- Affiliation: Islam
- Branch/tradition: Sunni
- Ecclesiastical or organizational status: mosque
- Status: Active

Location
- Location: Arau, Perlis
- Country: Malaysia
- Interactive map of Perlis State Mosque
- Coordinates: 6°26′N 100°16′E

Architecture
- Type: mosque
- Style: Modernist; Moorish Revival
- Completed: 1972

Specifications
- Capacity: 7,000 worshipers
- Dome: One
- Minaret: Three (maybe more)

The Perlis State Mosque (Malay: Masjid Negeri Perlis) is a Sunni mosque, located in Arau, Perlis, Malaysia. The mosque serves as the state and royal mosque of Perlis. The mosque was built in 1972 on the site of where the Old Arau Mosque used to stand.

== Architecture ==
The mosque has a modern architecture style with Moorish Revival influence. The floor is made of marble covered with carpet. It is capable of accommodating 7,000 worshipers. Its upper floor is dedicated for the female prayer hall.

== See also ==
- Islam in Malaysia
- List of mosques in Malaysia
