= Ranjit Singh Ramday =

Malaysian retired military officer)

Yang Berbahagia Major General (Rtd) Dato' Ranjit Singh Ramday PSAT DPMP PGDK PAT JSM SSP ASDK KAT KMN AMP PPT PPS PPA PNBB PJM PKN
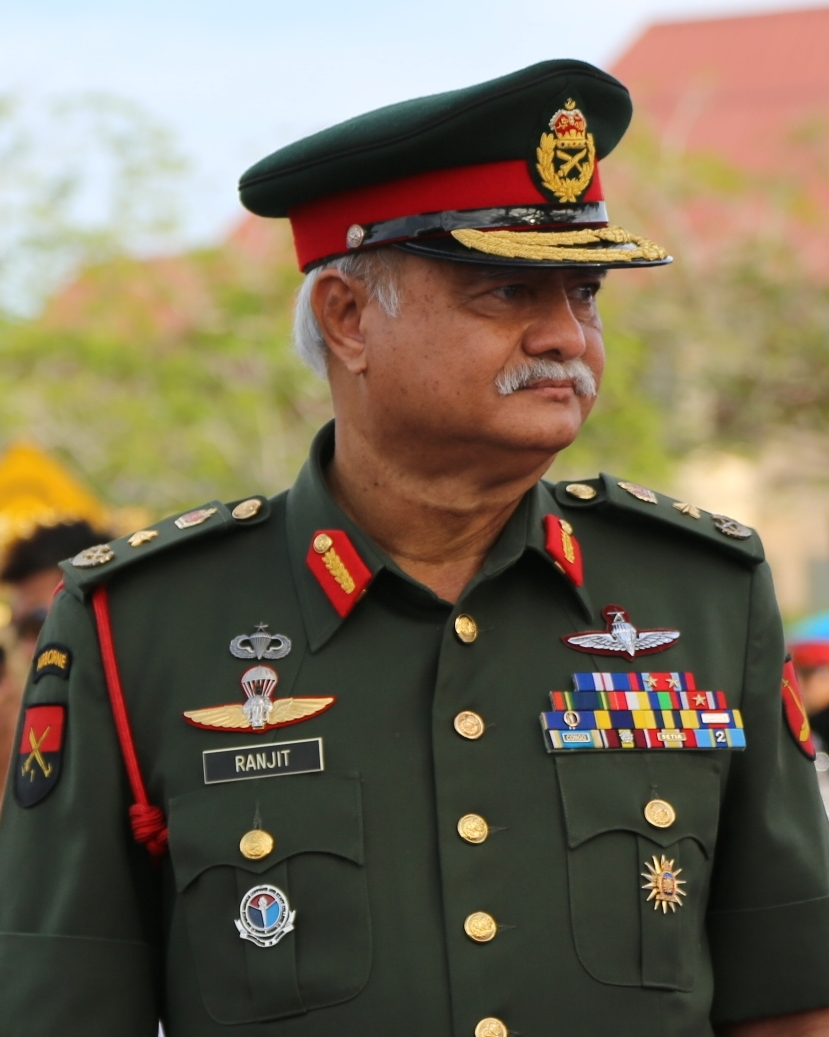
- Ranjit in 2013
- Born: 17 June 1955 (age 71); Melalap, Tenom, Crown Colony of North Borneo
- Military career
- Allegiance: Malaysia
- Branch: Malaysian Army
- Service years: 1974–2015
- Rank: Major General
- Unit: Royal Ranger Regiment
- Conflicts: Second Malayan Emergency; Operation Daulat

Ranjit Singh Ramday (born 17 June 1955) is a Malaysian retired military officer. His last position in the military was as commander of 1st Infantry Division from October to December 2014.

== Early life and education ==
Ranjit was born in Melalap, Tenom and raised in Kampung Kuala Kimanis, Papar. He received his primary education at SK St. Agnes Primary School in Kimanis, Papar and later at SMK St. Joseph Secondary School in Papar.

== Military career ==
Ranjit's interest in military service led him to the Royal Military College, Sungai Besi in November 1973. He was 18 years old at the time. From 1990 to 1991, Ranjit participated in a 10-month advanced training course for army personnel at the Defence Services Command and Staff College in Dhaka, Bangladesh.

From July 1996 to December 1999, Ranjit commanded the 8th Parachute Battalion, Royal Ranger Regiment. He also served overseas and participated in the United Nations Organization Stabilization Mission in the Democratic Republic of the Congo in 2004. After that, he headed of training planning at the Malaysian Army Training and Doctrine Command Headquarters in Kuala Lumpur.

In July 2012, Ranjit was appointed as commander of 5th Infantry Brigade and he led the brigade when the 2013 Lahad Datu standoff was ongoing.

In October 2014, Ranjit was appointed as commander of 1st Infantry Division and he held that post until December in the same year to prepare for his retirement in June of the following year.

== Honours ==
=== Honours of Malaysia ===
- Malaysia
  - Companion of the Order of Loyalty to the Crown of Malaysia (JSM) (2014)
  - Officer of the Order of the Defender of the Realm (KMN) (2005)
  - Recipient of the Loyal Service Medal (PPS)
  - Recipient of the General Service Medal (PPA)
  - Recipient of the United Nations Missions Service Medal (PNBB) with "CONGO" clasp
  - Recipient of the National Sovereignty Medal (PKN) (2013)
- Malaysian Armed Forces
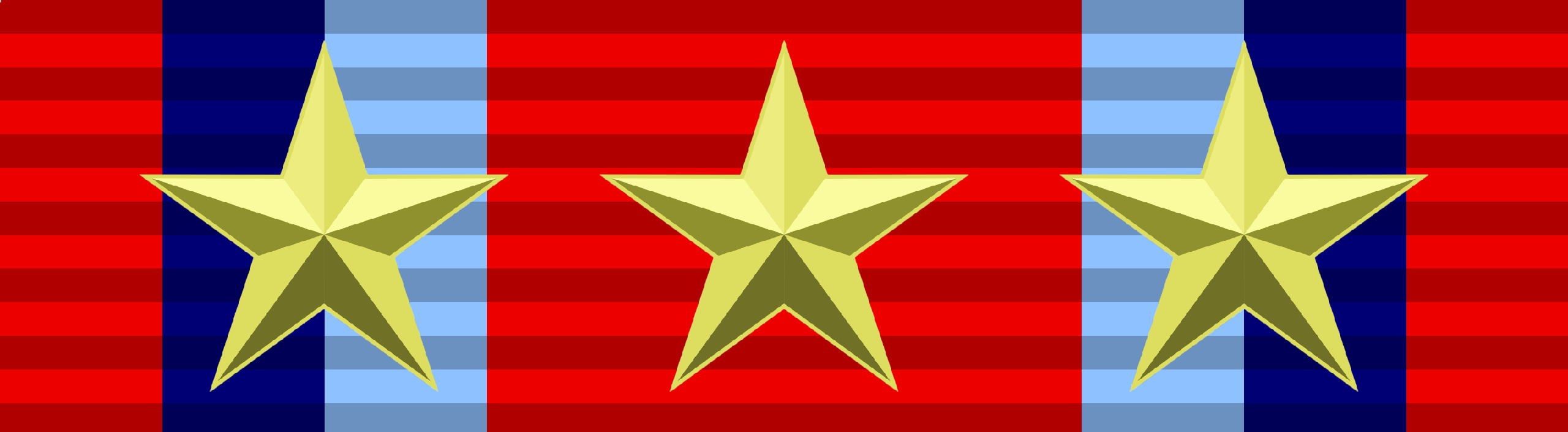
  - Loyal Commander of the Most Gallant Order of Military Service (PSAT) (2015)
  - Warrior of the Most Gallant Order of Military Service (PAT)
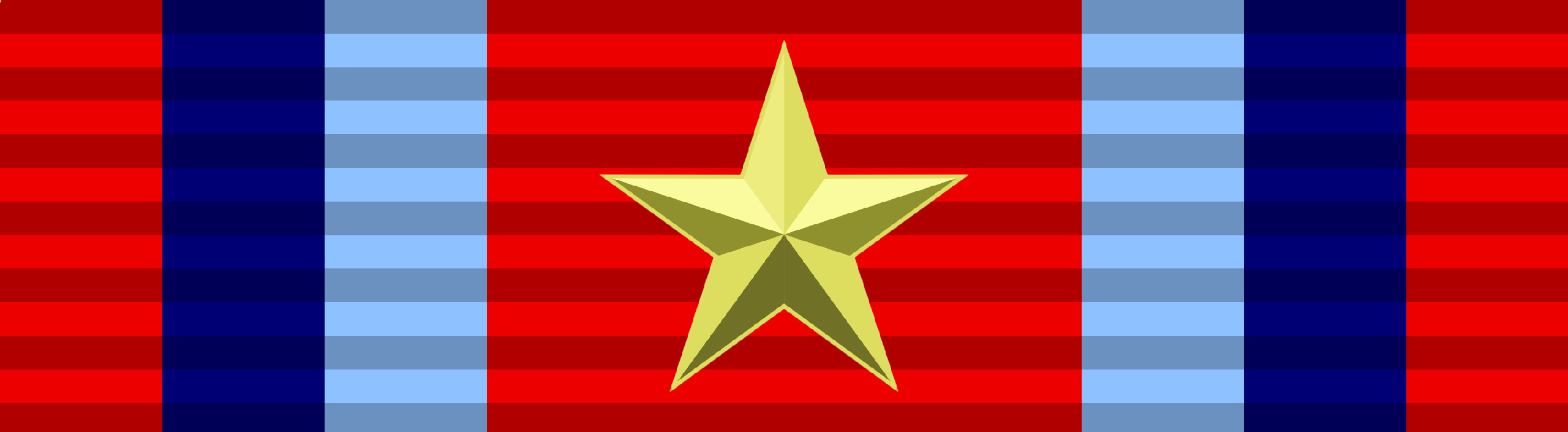
  - Officer of the Most Gallant Order of Military Service (KAT)
  - Recipient of the Malaysian Service Medal (PJM)
- Perlis
  - Knight Commander of the Order of the Crown of Perlis (DPMP) – Dato' (2013)
  - Companion of the Order of Prince Syed Sirajuddin Jamalullail of Perlis (SSP) (2009)
  - Member of the Order of the Crown of Perlis (AMP) (2001)
  - Recipient of the Distinguished Conduct Medal (PPT)
- Sabah
  - Commander of the Order of Kinabalu (PGDK) – Datuk (2011)
  - Companion of the Order of Kinabalu (ASDK) (2001)

=== Foreign honours ===
- United Nations
  - Recipient of the MONUC Medal with "2" award numeral
