= Tuanku Tengku Fauziah =

Queen consort of Perlis since 2000

Fauziah فوزية
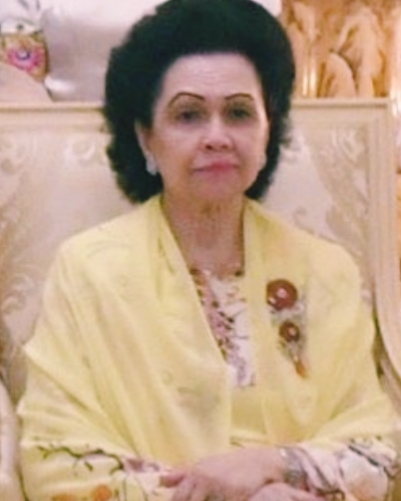
- Tuanku Tengku Fauziah in 2021

Queen consort of Malaysia
- Tenure: 13 December 2001 – 12 December 2006
- Installation: 25 April 2002
- Predecessor: Tuanku Siti Aishah
- Successor: Tuanku Nur Zahirah

Raja Perempuan of Perlis
- Tenure: 17 April 2000 – present
- Installation: 14 July 2000
- Predecessor: Tengku Budriah
- Born: 6 June 1946 (age 80); Kota Bharu, Kelantan
- Spouse: Tuanku Syed Sirajuddin (m. 1967)
- Issue: Tuanku Syed Faizuddin Putra Jamalullail; Sharifah Fazira
Names
- Tengku Fauziah binti Tengku Abdul Rashid
Regnal name
- Tuanku Tengku Fauziah binti Almarhum Tengku Abdul Rashid
- House: Bendahara (by birth); Jamalullail (by marriage)
- Father: Tengku Temenggong Tengku Abdul Rashid ibni Almarhum Sultan Sulaiman Badrul Alam Shah of Terengganu
- Mother: Tengku Petri binti Almarhum Sultan Ibrahim of Kelantan
- Religion: Sunni Islam

Tuanku Tengku Fauziah binti Almarhum Tengku Abdul Rashid (Jawi: توانكو تڠكو فوزية بنت المرحوم تڠكو عبدالرشيد; born 6 June 1946) is the current Raja Perempuan (queen consort) of Perlis. She also served as the 12th Raja Permaisuri Agong (queen of Malaysia) from 13 December 2001 to 12 December 2006.

Tuanku Fauziah is a princess of the royal houses of Terengganu on her father's side and Kelantan on her mother's side. Tuanku Fauziah is the daughter of Almarhum Tengku Temenggong Tengku Abdul Rashid ibni Almarhum Sultan Sulaiman Badrul Alam Shah of Terengganu and Almarhumah Tengku Petri binti Almarhum Sultan Ibrahim of Kelantan. She was born on 6 June 1946, and spent her early years in Kota Bharu, Kelantan.

== Early years ==
As a student at Zainab English School, Tuanku Fauziah enjoyed recreation and sports such as stage acting, netball and rounders.

At 17, she became engaged to Sirajuddin of Perlis, who at the time was still studying in the United Kingdom. To prepare her for her future role of consort to the heir and later to the ruler, she was invited to stay with her future husband's family while they lived at the Istana Negara, Kuala Lumpur as the Yang di-Pertuan Agong and Raja Permaisuri Agong. During her stay with her future in-laws, she made trips back to Kelantan whenever necessary.

=== Marriage ===
On 15 February 1967, Tuanku Fauziah married Tuanku Syed Sirajuddin who was then the Raja Muda of Perlis. In recognition of her new position, she was conferred the prestigious Seri Paduka Mahkota Perlis (SPMP) award by her father-in-law, Raja Putra of Perlis, eight months later. On 30 April 1968, Tuanku Fauziah was officially created "Duli Yang Teramat Mulia Raja Puan Muda Perlis".

As a young bride, Tuanku Fauziah accompanied her husband on all his postings as a junior military officer. However two years later, she returned to Perlis for good when Sirajuddin decided to take on his official role as crown prince of the state.

== Becoming queen ==
Tuanku Fauziah was officially declared "Duli Yang Maha Mulia Raja Perempuan Perlis" on 14 July 2000. On 13 December 2001, Tuanku Fauziah was officially declared as "Seri Paduka Baginda Raja Permaisuri Agong" when her husband Sirajuddin became the 12th Yang di-Pertuan Agong (King of Malaysia).

== Family ==
Tuanku Fauziah is the mother of a son and a daughter, Tuanku Syed Faizuddin Putra Jamalullail, Raja Muda, and Sharifah Fazira, Tengku Puteri Mahkota. She is close to her only daughter-in-law, Tuanku Lailatul Shahreen, Raja Puan Muda and only late son-in-law, Mohammad Yaakob.

She is also related to the Royal Pattani family in southern Thailand.

== Awards and recognitions ==
=== Honours of Perlis ===
- Perlis
  - Recipient of the Royal Family Order of Perlis (DKP) (17 May 2016)
  - Recipient of the Perlis Family Order of the Gallant Prince Syed Putra Jamalullail (DK) (1999)
  - Knight Grand Companion of the Order of the Gallant Prince Syed Putra Jamalullail (SSPJ) (4 December 1995)
  - Knight Grand Commander of the Order of the Crown of Perlis or Star of Safi (SPMP) (1967)

=== Honours of Malaysia ===
- Malaysia
  - Recipient of the Order of the Crown of the Realm (DMN) (2002)
- Johor
  - Knight Grand Commander of the Order of the Crown of Johor (SPMJ) (before 1967)
- Kelantan
  - Recipient of the Royal Family Order of Kelantan or Star of Yunus (DK) (30 March 2004)
- Pahang
  - Member 1st class of the Family Order of the Crown of Indra of Pahang (DK I) (26 October 2005)

=== Foreign Honours ===
- Cambodia
  - Grand Cross of the Royal Order of Cambodia (16 December 2002)
- Italy
  - Knight Grand Cross of the Order of Merit of the Italian Republic (9 June 2003)
- Japan
  - Grand Cordon of the Order of the Precious Crown (7 March 2005)
  - Gold and Silver Star (Second class) of the Order of the Sacred Treasure (23 February 1970)
- Spain
  - Dame Grand Cross of the Order of Isabella the Catholic (13 May 2004)
- Sweden
  - Member Grand Cross of the Royal Order of the Polar Star (14 September 2005)

=== Places named after her ===
- Tuanku Fauziah Hospital in Kangar, Perlis
- Muzium dan Galeri Tuanku Fauziah, Universiti Sains Malaysia, Gelugor, Penang
- SMK Raja Puan Muda Tengku Fauziah, a secondary school in Kaki Bukit, Perlis
- Taman Fauziah, a residential area in Kangar, Perlis
- Tuanku Tengku Fauziah Repository Centre in Kuala Perlis, Perlis

== See also ==
- Yang Di-Pertuan Agong
- Raja Permaisuri Agong

Malaysian royalty
Preceded by Tuanku Siti Aishah (Tengku Permaisuri of Selangor)	Raja Permaisuri Agong (Queen of Malaysia)	Succeeded by Tuanku Nur Zahirah (Sultanah Terengganu)
