= Sirajuddin of Perlis =

King of Malaysia from 2001 to 2006

Sirajuddin
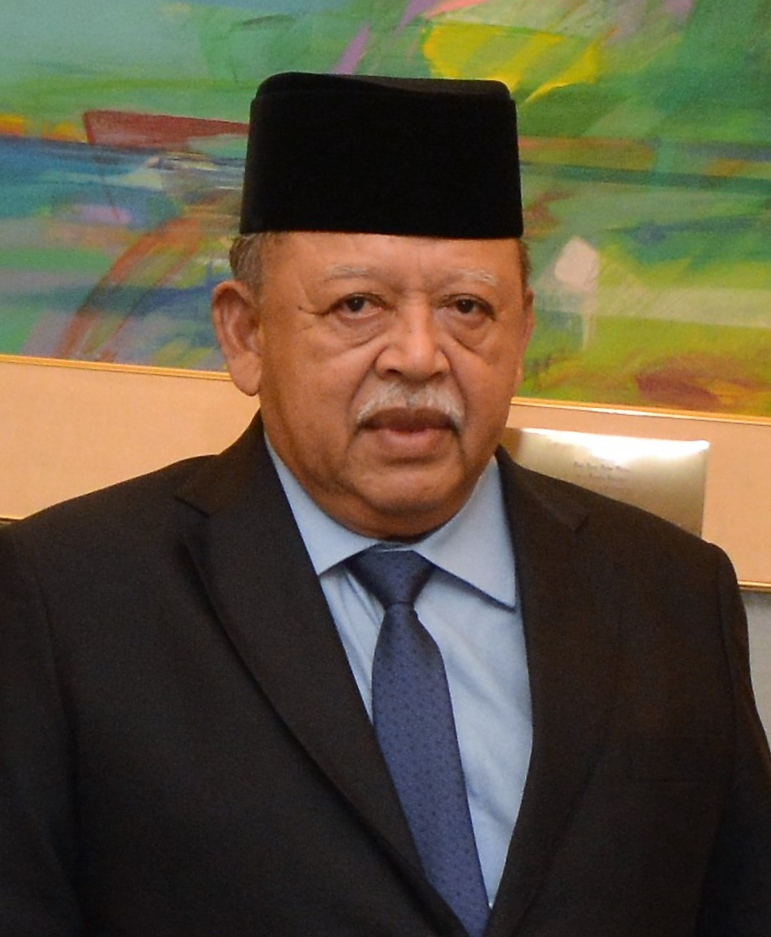
- Sirajuddin in 2018

King of Malaysia
- Reign: 13 December 2001 – 12 December 2006
- Installation: 25 April 2002
- Predecessor: Salahuddin
- Successor: Mizan Zainal Abidin

Raja of Perlis
- Reign: 17 April 2000 – present
- Installation: 7 May 2001
- Predecessor: Putra
- Heir apparent: Faizuddin
- Born: 17 May 1943 (age 83); Arau, Perlis, Malaya
- Spouse: Tengku Fauziah binti Almarhum Tengku Abdul Rashid (m. 1967)
- Issue: Tuanku Syed Faizuddin Putra Jamalullail; Sharifah Fazira
Names
- Tuan Syed Sirajuddin Ibni Tuan Syed Harun Putra Jamalullail
Regnal name
- Tuanku Syed Sirajuddin ibni Almarhum Tuanku Syed Putra Jamalullail
- House: Jamalullail
- Father: Tuanku Syed Putra Ibni Almarhum Tuan Syed Hassan Jamalullail
- Mother: Tengku Budriah Binti Almarhum Tengku Ismail
- Religion: Sunni Islam

Sirajuddin ibni Almarhum Tuanku Syed Putra Jamalullail (Jawi: توانكو سيد سراج الدين ابن المرحوم توانكو سيد ڤوترا جمل الليل; born 17 May 1943) is the current Raja of Perlis, reigning since 2000. He reigned as the king of Malaysia from 2001 to 2006.

== Early life and education ==
Tuanku Syed Sirajuddin was born on 17 May 1943 in Arau, Perlis. He is the second of ten children and the eldest son Putra of Perlis and Raja Perempuan Budriah.

His primary education began at the Arau Malay School. On 5 January 1950, he moved to Penang to continue his studies at Wellesley Primary School, followed by Westland Primary School until 1955. He commenced his secondary education at Penang Free School on 9 January 1956.

In 1960, he traveled to the United Kingdom to attend Wellingborough School, where he studied for four years until 1963. He was subsequently appointed as the Raja Muda of Perlis while still a student on 30 October 1960.

Tuanku Syed Sirajuddin pursued military training as an officer cadet at the Royal Military Academy Sandhurst in Sandhurst, England. He joined the academy in January 1964 and was attached to Burma Company, Victory College. He completed his training in December 1965 and was commissioned as a second lieutenant in the Malaysian Reconnaissance Corps.

== Early career ==
Upon his return from England, Tuanku Syed Sirajuddin served with Malaysia's Ministry of Defence. His first post was as second lieutenant in the 2nd Regiment of the Malaysian Reconnaissance Corps on 12 December 1965. In 1966, he was transferred to Sabah and then to Sarawak in 1967. He then served in Pahang for several years until he resigned on 31 December 1969 to return to Perlis. He was promoted to the rank of lieutenant in December 1967.

In 1970, he served in the armed forces again, as Captain of the Local Territorial Army from 16 November 1970 until 1 October 1972. He was promoted to major on 1 October 1972. Currently, he is the Commanding Officer of Regiment 504 of the Army Reserve Unit with the rank of colonel.

== Raja Muda of Perlis ==
On 30 October 1960, Sirajuddin was made the Raja Muda (Crown Prince) of Perlis while he was still a student at Penang Free School. At that time, his father, Putra was carrying out his duties as the 3rd Yang di-Pertuan Agong.

== Raja of Perlis ==
Sirajuddin was installed as the 12th raja of Perlis on 17 April 2000, the day after the death of his father, Putra who had been the raja since 1945, and was the world's longest reigning monarch at the time.

== Yang di-Pertuan Agong ==
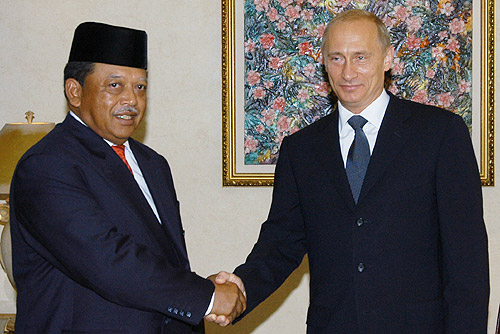
Sirajuddin with Russian President Vladimir Putin, 5 August 2003.

Continuing the tradition of the Yang di-Pertuan Agong rotation, Sirajuddin was elected as the 12th Yang di-Pertuan Agong. His term began on 13 December 2001. This was earlier than expected because the previous and 11th yang di-pertuan agong, Sultan Salahuddin of Selangor, died in office on 21 November 2001 while his term should have ended in 2004. At that time, he was the fastest ruler to become the Yang di-Pertuan Agong from his accession to his state's throne, at 1 year and 241 days (record now held by Sultan Abdullah of Pahang). Tuanku Sirajuddin's term ended on 12 December 2006.

== Personal life ==
On 15 February 1967, he married Tuanku Tengku Fauziah (born 6 June 1946) at Kota Bharu, Kelantan, daughter of Tengku Temenggong Tengku Abdul Rashid ibni Almarhum Sultan Sulaiman Badrul Alam Shah of Terengganu, by his wife Tengku Petri binti Almarhum Sultan Ibrahim of Kelantan, who became the Raja Puan Muda of Perlis. Tuanku Syed Sirajuddin was appointed for the first time as the Regent of Perlis when the Raja of Perlis and the Raja Perempuan of Perlis travelled to the United States and Europe from 23 June 1967 until 24 October 1967.

Tuanku Syed Sirajuddin has one son and one daughter:

- His Royal Highness Tuanku Syed Faizuddin Putra, Raja Muda of Perlis (born on 30 December 1967)
- Her Highness Sharifah Fazira, Tengku Puteri Mahkota of Perlis (born on 5 June 1973).

Tuanku Syed Sirajuddin has travelled to many countries including United Kingdom, France, Germany, Denmark, Austria, Italy, Switzerland, Egypt, Spain, Libya, the Netherlands, Belgium, Thailand and Saudi Arabia.

Tuanku Syed Sirajuddin is also active in sports. Among his favourite sports are golf, tennis, football and is a fan of Tottenham Hotspur football club. He has been the Chairman of Putra Golf Club, Perlis since May 1971, and the patron of the Association of Football Referees of Perlis since 1967. He was also the Chairman of the Football Association of Perlis for 18 years.

== Social contributions ==
Tuanku Syed Sirajuddin interacts frequently with his people through various fields and heads many social organisations, which are:

- Chairman of the Rayuan Binaan Wisma Pahlawan Negeri Perlis and Chairman of the Exhibition Committee of the Malaysian Royal Armed Forces in Perlis on 1 April 1971.
- Chairman of the Association of Malaysian Ex-Servicemen, Perlis branch for five years.
- Chairman of the Rayuan Derma Hari Pahlawan Negeri Perlis since 1972.
- Patron of 4B Youth Movement of Perlis.

Sirajuddin is known for his dedication towards his people and takes an interest in education. With the establishment of the Tuanku Syed Putra Foundation in 1986, many Perlis students have been able to further their studies locally and abroad. Tuanku Syed Sirajuddin is the Chairman of this foundation.

Tuanku Syed Sirajuddin became directly involved in religious affairs when he was appointed President of the Islamic Council of Perlis by Tuanku Syed Putra. Tuanku Syed Sirajuddin is especially concerned that the religious affairs of the state are based on the 'Ahlis Sunnah Waljamaah' doctrine. In this regard, Tuanku Syed Sirajuddin is constantly in touch with the religious leaders of Perlis.

== Awards and recognitions ==
Styles of Sirajuddin
- Reference style: His Royal Highness
- Spoken style: Your Royal Highness
- Alternative style: Tuanku

- Tuanku Syed Sirajuddin held the rank of Marshal of the Royal Malaysian Air Force, Admiral of the Fleet, Royal Malaysian Navy and Field Marshal, Malaysian Army in light of his duties as Supreme Commander of the Malaysian Armed Forces, thus becoming the third royal ruler to rise from the ranks as an active military officer to the rank of supreme commander-in-chief.
- Colonel-in-Chief, Royal Ranger Regiment

=== Honours of Perlis ===
Perlis

- Founding Grand Master of the Royal Family Order of Perlis (since 17 May 2001)
- Member (DK, 29 December 1965) and Grand Master of the Perlis Family Order of the Gallant Prince Syed Putra Jamalullail (since 17 April 2000)
- Grand Master of the Order of the Gallant Prince Syed Sirajuddin Jamalullail (since 2001)
- Grand Master of the Order of Prince Syed Sirajuddin Jamalullail of Perlis (since 2005)
- Order of the Gallant Prince Syed Putra Jamalullail: Knight Grand Companion (SSPJ, 4 December 1995) and Grand Master (since 17 April 2000)
- Grand Master of the Order of the Crown of Perlis (since 17 April 2000)
- Recipient of the Tuanku Syed Sirajuddin Jamalullail Installation Medal (7 May 2001)
- Recipient of Tuanku Syed Sirajuddin Jamalullail 10th Reign Anniversary Medal (2010)
- Recipient of Tuanku Syed Sirajuddin Jamalullail Silver Jubilee Medal (2025)

=== Honours of Malaysia ===
- Malaysia (as Yang di-Pertuan Agong of Malaysia)
  - Order of the Royal House of Malaysia: Recipient (DKM) (2002) and Grand Master (13 December 2001 – 12 December 2006)
  - Order of the Crown of the Realm: Recipient (DMN) (2001) and Grand Master (13 December 2001 – 12 December 2006)
  - Grand Master of the Order of the Defender of the Realm (13 December 2001 – 12 December 2006)
  - Grand Master of the Order of Loyalty to the Crown of Malaysia (13 December 2001 – 12 December 2006)
  - Grand Master of the Order of Merit of Malaysia (13 December 2001 – 12 December 2006)
  - Grand Master of the Order for Important Services (Malaysia) (13 December 2001 – 12 December 2006)
  - Grand Master of the Order of the Royal Household of Malaysia (13 December 2001 – 12 December 2006)
  - Malaysian Service Medal (PJM) (17 April 2009)
- Johor
  - Knight Grand Commander of the Order of the Crown of Johor (SPMJ) – Dato'
- Kedah
  - Member of the Royal Family Order of Kedah (DK) (21 January 2002)
- Kelantan
  - Recipient of the Royal Family Order or Star of Yunus (DK) (2002)
- Negeri Sembilan
  - Member of the Royal Family Order of Negeri Sembilan (DKNS) (19 July 2001)
- Pahang
  - Member 1st class of the Family Order of the Crown of Indra of Pahang (DK I) (26 October 2005)
- Perak
  - Recipient of the Royal Family Order of Perak (DK)
  - Grand Knight of the Order of Cura Si Manja Kini (SPCM) – Dato' Seri
- Selangor
  - First Class of the Royal Family Order of Selangor (DK I) (14 December 2002)
- Terengganu
  - Member second class of the Family Order of Terengganu (DK II)
  - Member Grand Companion of the Order of Sultan Mahmud I of Terengganu (SSMT) – Dato' Seri (8 October 1998)

=== Foreign honours ===
- Brunei
  - Recipient of the Royal Family Order of the Crown of Brunei (DKMB) (10 August 2002)
- Cambodia
  - Grand Collar of the National Order of Independence (16 December 2002)
  - Grand Cross of the Royal Order of Cambodia (16 December 2002)
- Croatia
  - Grand Cross of the Grand Order of King Tomislav (20 March 2002)
- France
  - Grand Cross of the National Order of the Legion of Honour (8 May 2004)
- Finland
  - Commander Grand Cross with Collar of Order of the White Rose of Finland (19 September 2005)
- Italy
  - Knight Grand Cross with Collar of the Order of Merit of the Italian Republic (9 June 2003)
- Japan
  - Collar of the Order of the Chrysanthemum (7 March 2005)
  - Grand Cordon of the Order of the Rising Sun (23 February 1970)
- Saudi Arabia
  - Collar of Badr Chain
- Singapore
  - Member 1st Class of the Order of Temasek (DUT) (11 April 2005)
- Sweden
  - Knight of the Royal Order of the Seraphim (14 September 2005)
- Syria
  - Member 1st Class of the Order of Umayyad (7 May 2004)

=== Places named after him ===
- Persiaran Tuanku Syed Sirajuddin (formerly known as Persiaran Duta) in Kuala Lumpur
- Politeknik Tuanku Syed Sirajuddin in Arau, Perlis
- Sirajuddin Mosque in Padang Pauh, Perlis
- Kem Syed Sirajuddin, a military camp in Gemas, Negeri Sembilan
- SMK Syed Sirajuddin, a secondary school in Arau, Perlis
- SK Kem Syed Sirajuddin, a primary school in Gemas, Negeri Sembilan

Sirajuddin of Perlis House of Jamalullail Born: 1943
Regnal titles
Preceded by Sultan Salahuddin (Sultan of Selangor)	Yang di-Pertuan Agong (King of Malaysia); 2001–2006	Succeeded by Sultan Mizan Zainal Abidin (Sultan of Terengganu)
Preceded by Tuanku Syed Putra	Raja of Perlis; 2000–present	Incumbent; Heir apparent: Tuanku Syed Faizuddin Putra Jamalullail
