= Putra of Perlis =

Yang di-Pertuan Agong from 1960 to 1965

Putra ڤوترا
- Tuanku Sir Syed
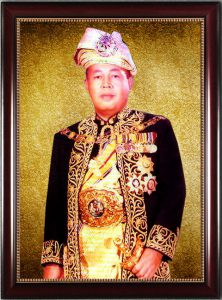
- Official portrait of Tuanku Syed Putra as the 3rd Yang di-Pertuan Agong

King of Malaysia
- Reign: 21 September 1960 – 20 September 1965
- Installation: 4 January 1961
- Predecessor: Hisamuddin
- Successor: Ismail Nasiruddin

Raja of Perlis
- Reign: 4 December 1945 – 16 April 2000
- Installation: 12 March 1949
- Predecessor: Syed Hamzah Jamalullail
- Successor: Syed Sirajuddin
- Born: 25 November 1920; Arau, Perlis, Unfederated Malay States
- Died: 16 April 2000 (aged 79); Kuala Lumpur, Malaysia
- Burial: 17 April 2000; Arau Royal Mausoleum, Arau, Perlis, Malaysia
- Spouse: Tengku Budriah binti Almarhum Tengku Ismail (m. 1941) Che Puan Mariam binti Abdullah (Riam Pessayanavin) (m. 1952; died 1986)
- Issue: Tuanku Syed Sirajuddin; Tengku Sharif Bendahara; Dato' Seri DiRaja Syed Badaruddin; Tengku Sharif Temenggong; Dato' Seri DiRaja Syed Amir Zainal Abidin; Tengku Sharif Laksamana; Dato' Seri DiRaja Syed Razlan; Tengku Sharif Panglima Dato' Seri DiRaja Tan Sri Syed Zainol Anwar; Tengku Puteri Utama; Dato' Seri DiRaja Sharifah Salwa; Dato' Seri DiRaja Sharifah Jalaina; Tengku Puan Laksamana Kelantan; Dato' Seri DiRaja Sharifah Azwan; Dato' Seri Sharifah Junetta; Dato' Seri Sharifah Endah; Dato' Seri Syed Zainal Rashid; Dato' Seri Syed Azni; Dato' Seri Syed Badlishah; Dato' Seri Sharifah Melanie
Names
- Tuan Syed Harun Putra ibni Tuan Syed Hassan Jamalullail
Regnal name
- Tuanku Syed Putra ibni Almarhum Syed Hassan Jamalullail
- House: Jamalullail
- Father: Tuan Syed Hassan ibni Almarhum Tuan Syed Mahmud Jamalullail
- Mother: Che Puan Wan Teh Binti Wan Endut
- Religion: Sunni Islam

Putra ibni Almarhum Syed Hassan Jamalullail (Jawi: توانكو سر سيد هارون ڤوترا ابن المرحوم سيد حسن جمل الليل; 25 November 1920 – 16 April 2000) was the Raja of Perlis from 1945 until his death in 2000, and the third Yang di-Pertuan Agong (King of Malaysia), from 1960 to 1965.

== Early career ==
Putra was born in Arau and was the son of Syed Hassan bin Syed Mahmud Jamalullail (1897 – 18 October 1935), sometime bakal raja or heir presumptive to the throne of Perlis, by his commoner wife Wan Teh binti Wan Endut (1898 – 27 December 1952). He was educated at the Arau Malay School and later at Penang Free School between 1937 and 1939. At 18, he joined the Perlis administrative service, becoming a magistrate and in 1940, was transferred to Kuala Lumpur to serve as Second Magistrate in the Criminal Court.

== Perlis succession dispute ==
The fourth Raja of Perlis, Syed Alwi ibni Syed Safi Jamalullail (born 1881; r. 1905–1943) was childless and had several half-brothers competing for the role of heir presumptive. Succession to the Perlisian throne was not automatic and an heir presumptive had to be confirmed in that post by the State Council comprising the raja and several others.

Syed Putra's paternal grandfather Syed Mahmud (died 1919), was the oldest son of Raja Syed Safi ibni Almarhum Syed Alwi Jamalullail (the third Raja). He was also a half brother of Raja Syed Alwi. He served as raja muda until 1912 when he was convicted and jailed in Alor Star, Kedah until 1917. Two years later, he died in Alor Star. On 6 December 1934, Syed Mahmud's son Syed Hassan was, by a three to one vote, selected by the State Council as bakal raja or heir presumptive. However, Syed Hassan died on 18 October 1935.

On 30 April 1938, again by a three to one vote, the State Council chose Syed Putra (son of Syed Hassan) as the bakal raja. This choice was opposed by Syed Hamzah, the younger half-brother of Raja Syed Alwi and Vice-President of the State Council on the grounds that Syed Putra was too far removed from the throne under Islamic inheritance laws (primogeniture did not then apply in Perlis). However, the British colonial rulers supported Syed Putra.

== Japanese occupation ==
At the outbreak of the Pacific War, Raja Syed Alwi retreated to Kuala Kangsar, Perak. He returned to Perlis on 28 December 1941 but was already very ill and state affairs were exercised by Syed Hamzah. Syed Putra was at the time serving in the judiciary in Kuala Lumpur and had been advised by Sultan Musa Ghiatuddin Riayat Shah of Selangor to remain there. In May 1942, Syed Hamzah persuaded Raja Syed Alwi to withdraw Syed Putra's appointment as bakal raja and instead Syed Hamzah himself was appointed to that post. Raja Syed Alwi died in Arau on 1 February 1943 and a day later, before the funeral, Syed Hamzah was proclaimed fifth Raja of Perlis, by the consent of the Japanese Military Governor of Kedah and Perlis.

Syed Putra and his family stayed in Klang until 15 May 1942 when he returned to Perlis. He lived in a hut near the Arau railway station and received a monthly allowance of $90 from Raja Syed Alwi but this ceased on the latter's death. On 29 March 1945 he left for Kelantan, the home state of his consort Tengku Budriah, where he sold cakes and sundry goods for a living.

== Return of the British ==
The British Military Administration (BMA) under Lord Mountbatten refused to recognise Syed Hamzah as Raja. On 18 September 1945, Syed Hamzah abdicated. He went into exile in Thailand and died in Arau on 20 February 1958.

On 4 December 1945 the British proclaimed Syed Putra as sixth Raja of Perlis. He returned to Perlis from Kelantan, via Padang Besar. He was installed on 12 March 1949.

== Malayan Union ==
Raja Syed Putra objected to the Malayan Union treaty on the grounds that it contravened the 1930 British-Perlis Treaty giving governing power to the raja-in-council. However, his protests that he signed under duress was rejected by the British. Subsequently, like all other Malay rulers, Raja Syed Putra refused the Malayan Union treaty.

== Election as Deputy Yang di-Pertuan Agong ==
Raja Syed Putra was elected Deputy Yang di-Pertuan Agong by the Malay rulers and served in that office from 14 April 1960 until the death of Sultan Hisamuddin Alam Shah on 1 September 1960.

== Yang di-Pertuan Agong ==
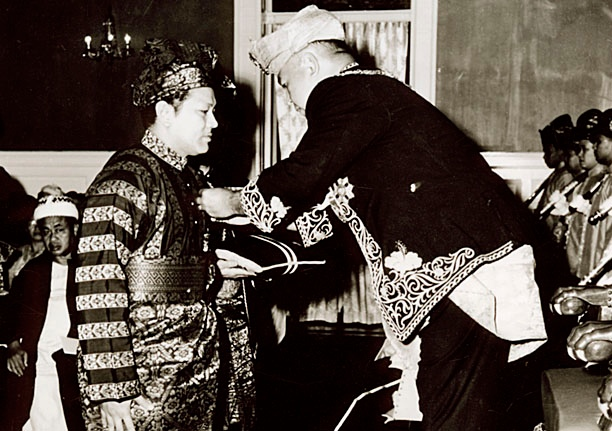
On 27 September 1962, Raja Syed Putra conferred the Ahli Mangku Negara (AMN) award on P. Ramlee, a Malaysian actor and musician.

Raja Syed Putra was elected as the third Yang di-Pertuan Agong of Malaya and served in that office from 21 September 1960. At 39 years and 301 days, he is the youngest Yang di-Pertuan Agong ever elected. He was installed at the Istana Negara on 4 January 1961. On 16 September 1963 Malaya, British Borneo, Sarawak and Singapore unified into the Federation of Malaysia. He completed his term in office on 20 September 1965. His son, Tuanku Syed Sirajuddin was elected as the 12th Yang di-Pertuan Agong and served from 2001 to 2006 after the death of the incumbent, Sultan Salahuddin Abdul Aziz Shah.

Raja Syed Putra's term of office as Yang di-Pertuan Agong was marked by the Konfrontasi between newly created Malaysia and its larger neighbour, Indonesia. He offered to stay on as Yang di-Pertuan Agong at the end of his term, to see out the end of confrontation, but this suggestion was rejected by Prime Minister Tunku Abdul Rahman.

As Yang di-Pertuan Agong, he instructed proper treatment of the royal regalia, which he believed was partly responsible for the mysterious illness and death of Sultan Hisamuddin of Selangor, his immediate predecessor.

== Later role ==
Raja Syed Putra became the doyen of the Malay rulers, giving advice to more junior rulers especially during the constitutional crisis with the Prime Minister Mahathir Mohamad in 1983 and 1993.

== Death ==
He died at the National Heart Institute, Kuala Lumpur on 16 April 2000 from a heart attack. At that time, he was the longest reigning monarch in the world, a position he inherited from Franz Joseph II, Prince of Liechtenstein in 1989. He was buried at the Royal Mausoleum in Arau, Perlis.

== Family life ==
Tuanku Syed Putra married twice:

1. in 1941 to Tengku Budriah binti Tengku Ismail (1924–2008) of the Patani Sultanate in Thailand. She served as his consort with the title of Raja Perempuan of Perlis and as Raja Permaisuri Agong. She is the mother of the current Raja of Perlis, Tuanku Syed Sirajuddin as well as five sons and five daughters.
2. in 1952 to Che Puan Mariam (née Riam Pessayanavin; 23 April 1923–1986) by whom he had three sons and one daughter. She was a Thai Muslim from Bangkok and Miss Siam in 1939.

== Awards and recognitions ==
=== Honours of Perlis ===
- Perlis
  - Recipient of the Perlis Family Order of the Gallant Prince Syed Putra Jamalullail (DK)
  - Knight Grand Companion (Dato' Sri Setia) of the Most Esteemed Order of the Gallant Prince Syed Putra Jamalullail (4.12.1995) - SSPJ
  - Knight Grand Commander (Dato' Sri Paduka) of the Most Illustrious Order of the Crown of Perlis (= the Star of Safi) - SPMP

=== Malaysian honours ===
- Malaysia (as Yang di-Pertuan Agong 1960–1965)
  - Recipient of the Royal Family Order of Malaysia - DKM (1966, after reign)
  - Grand Master (1960-1965) and Recipient of the Order of the Crown of the Realm (DMN, 4 February 1959)
  - Grand Commander (SMN) and Grand Master (1960-1965) of the Order of the Defender of the Realm
  - Founding Grand Master (3–20 September 1965) of the Order of the Royal Family of Malaysia
- Malaya
  - Recipient of the Order of the Crown of the Realm (DMN) (31 August 1958)
- Johor
  - First Class of the Royal Family Order of Johor (DK I)
- Kedah
  - Member of the Royal Family Order of Kedah (DK)
- Kelantan
  - Recipient of the Royal Family Order of Kelantan (DK)
- Negeri Sembilan
  - Member of the Royal Family Order of Negeri Sembilan (DKNS)
- Pahang
  - Member 1st class of the Family Order of the Crown of Indra of Pahang (DK I) (24 October 1980)
- Perak
  - Recipient of the Royal Family Order of Perak (DK) (1985)
- Selangor
  - First Class of the Royal Family Order of Selangor (DK I) (1970)
- Terengganu
  - First Class Member of the Royal Family Order of Terengganu (DK I)
- Sabah
  - Grand Commander of the Order of Kinabalu (SPDK) - Datuk Seri Panglima (1971)
- Sarawak
  - Knight Grand Commander of the Order of the Star of Hornbill Sarawak (DP) - Datuk Patinggi

=== Foreign honours ===
- United Kingdom
  - Knight Commander of the Order of St Michael and St George (KCMG) – Sir (1956)
  - Companion of the Order of St Michael and St George (CMG, 1948)
  - Recipient of the Queen Elizabeth II Coronation Medal (1953)
- Brunei
  - Family Order of Brunei 1st Class (DK) – Dato Laila Utama (23 September 1958)
- Cambodia
  - Grand Cross of the Royal Order of Cambodia (21 December 1962)
- Egypt
  - Grand Cordon of the Order of the Nile (17 April 1965)
- Japan
  - Collar of the Order of the Chrysanthemum (15 June 1964)
- Jordan
  - Collar of the Order of al-Hussein bin Ali (24 April 1965)
- Pakistan
  - 1st class of the Nishan-e-Pakistan (28 December 1961)
- Philippines
  - Grand Collar of the Order of Sikatuna (GCS) (10 February 1961)
- Saudi Arabia
  - Collar of the Order of the Badr Chain (3 April 1965)
- Thailand
  - Grand Cross of the Order of the Rajamitrabhorn (20 June 1962)

=== Places named after him ===
- Jalan Syed Putra, a stretch of the Federal Highway (Federal Route 2) between the old Kuala Lumpur railway station and Mid Valley Megamall.
- Tuanku Syed Putra Mosque in Kangar, Perlis
- SMS Tuanku Syed Putra in Kangar, Perlis
- Tuanku Syed Putra Stadium in Kangar, Perlis
- Kompleks Sukan Tuanku Syed Putra in Kangar, Perlis
- Dewan Tuanku Syed Putra, MRSM Beseri, Perlis
- SK Putra, a primary school in Kangar, Perlis
- Tuanku Syed Putra Building in George Town, Penang
- Dewan Tuanku Syed Putra, Universiti Sains Malaysia, George Town, Penang
- Jambatan Tuanku Syed Putra in Kuala Perlis, Perlis
- Persiaran Syed Putra in Kuala Lumpur
- Kem Syed Putra, a military camp in Ipoh, Perak
- Tuanku Syed Putra Football Cup
- Tuanku Syed Putra Junior International Tennis Championship

== Notes ==
- A nostalgic tale of two Putras, The Star, 14 August 2007.

Putra of Perlis House of Jamalullail Born: 25 November 1920 Died: 16 April 2000
Regnal titles
Preceded by Hisamuddin Alam Shah (Sultan of Selangor)	Yang di-Pertuan Agong (Supreme King of Malaysia); 21 September 1960 – 20 September 1965	Succeeded by Ismail Nasiruddin Shah (Sultan of Terengganu)
Preceded by Syed Hamzah	Raja of Perlis; 4 December 1945 – 16 April 2000	Succeeded by Syed Sirajuddin
