= Arau =

- Royal capital
- Arau, The Royal Town; Arau Bandar Diraja

lain transcription(s)
  - Jawi: :عراو، ڤرليس
  - Chinese: 亚娄
  - Tamil: ஆராவ்
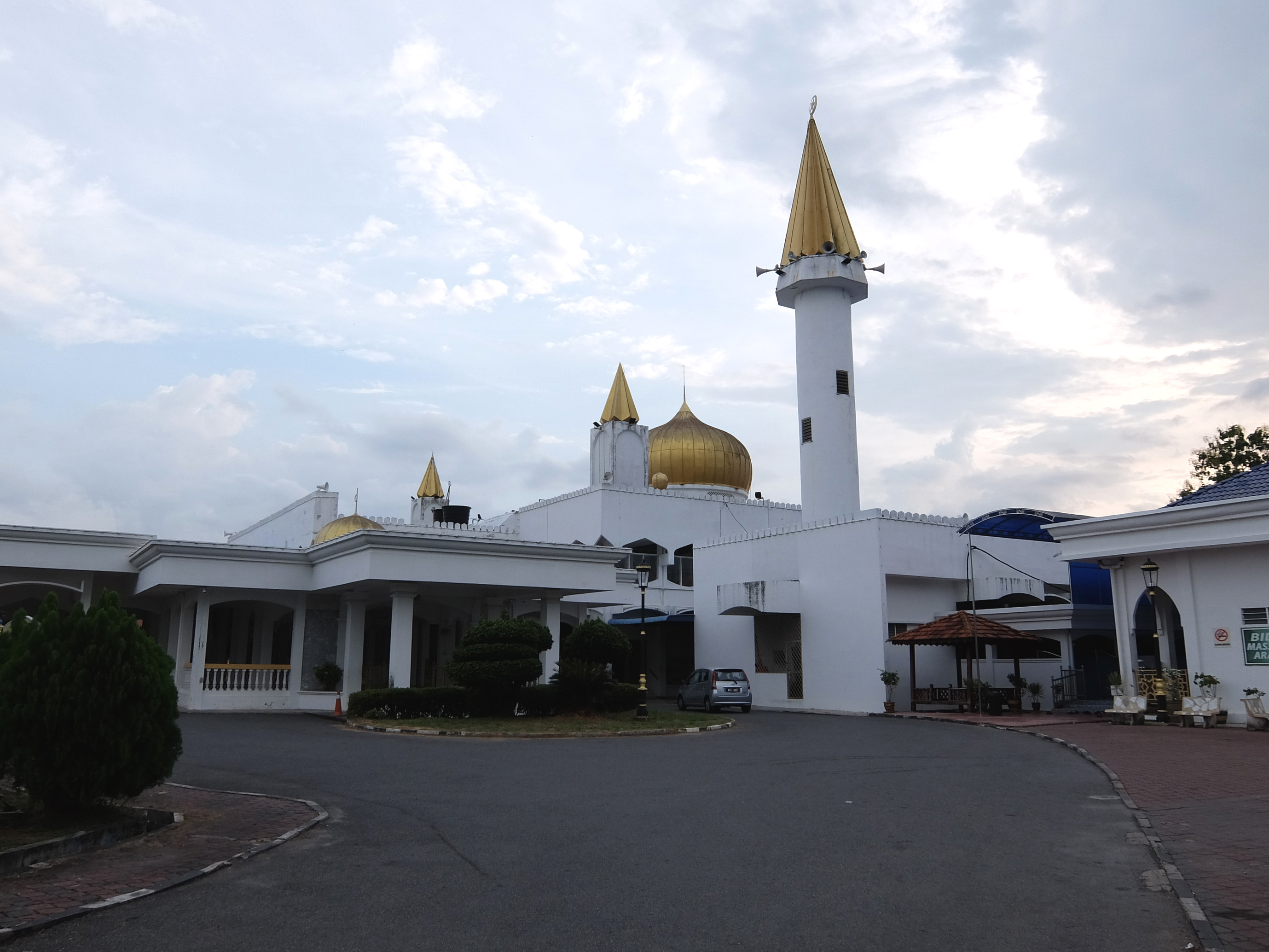
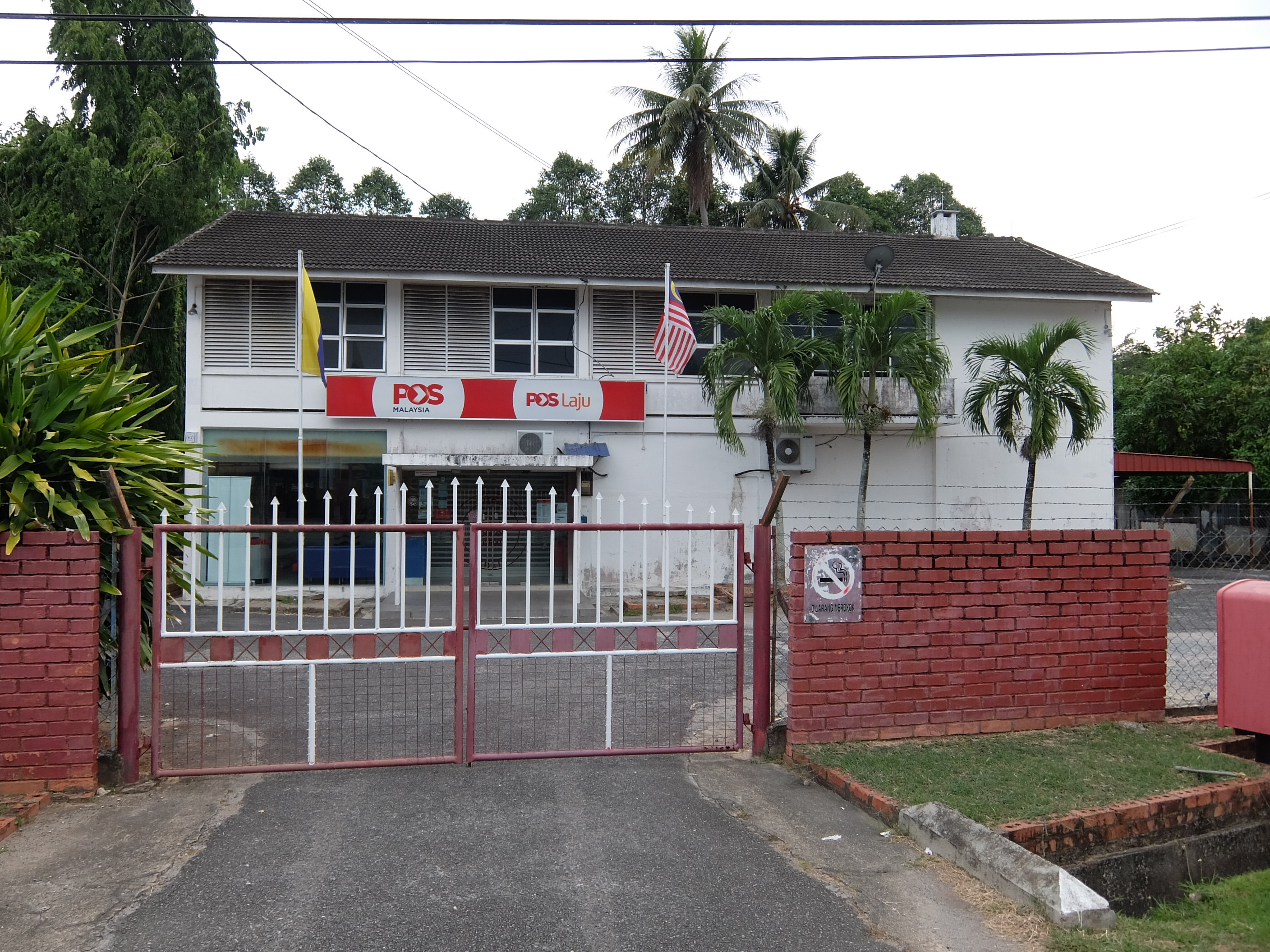
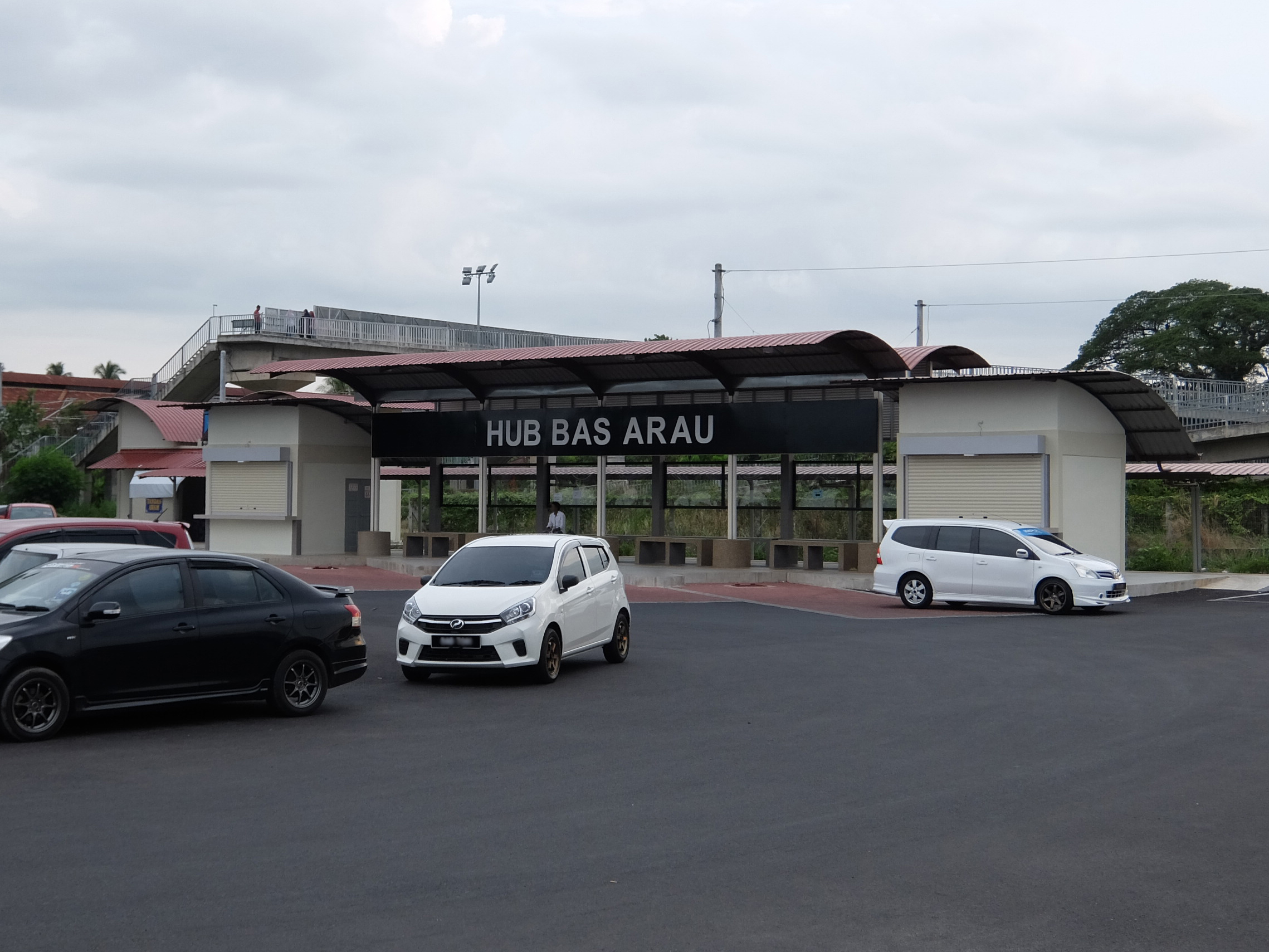
- Perlis State Mosque located in Arau Pos Malaysia in Arau Arau Bas Hub
- Interactive map of Arau
- Coordinates: 6°26′N 100°16′E
- Country: Malaysia
- State: Perlis
- District: N/A
- City: Kangar

Government
  - Local government: Kangar Municipal Council
  - Arau Member of Parliament: Shahidan Kassim (PAS)
- Time zone: UTC+8 (MST)
  - Summer (DST): Not observed
- Postal code: 02600
- Website: mpkangar.gov.my

Arau is the royal capital and a Mukim of Perlis, Malaysia. Arau is located 14 kilometres (8.7 mi) southeast of the Perlis state capital, Kangar. This town is home to Perlis Raja (House of Jamalullail) palace.

The town is the disembarkation point for visitors travelling from Kuala Lumpur to Langkawi by train. Arau is one of the mixed areas in Perlis with Malays making up 54% of the population, Chinese at 27% and Indians at 16% and 3% Others.

== Facilities ==
=== Palace ===
- Istana Arau

=== Education ===
- Universiti Teknologi MARA

=== Transportation ===
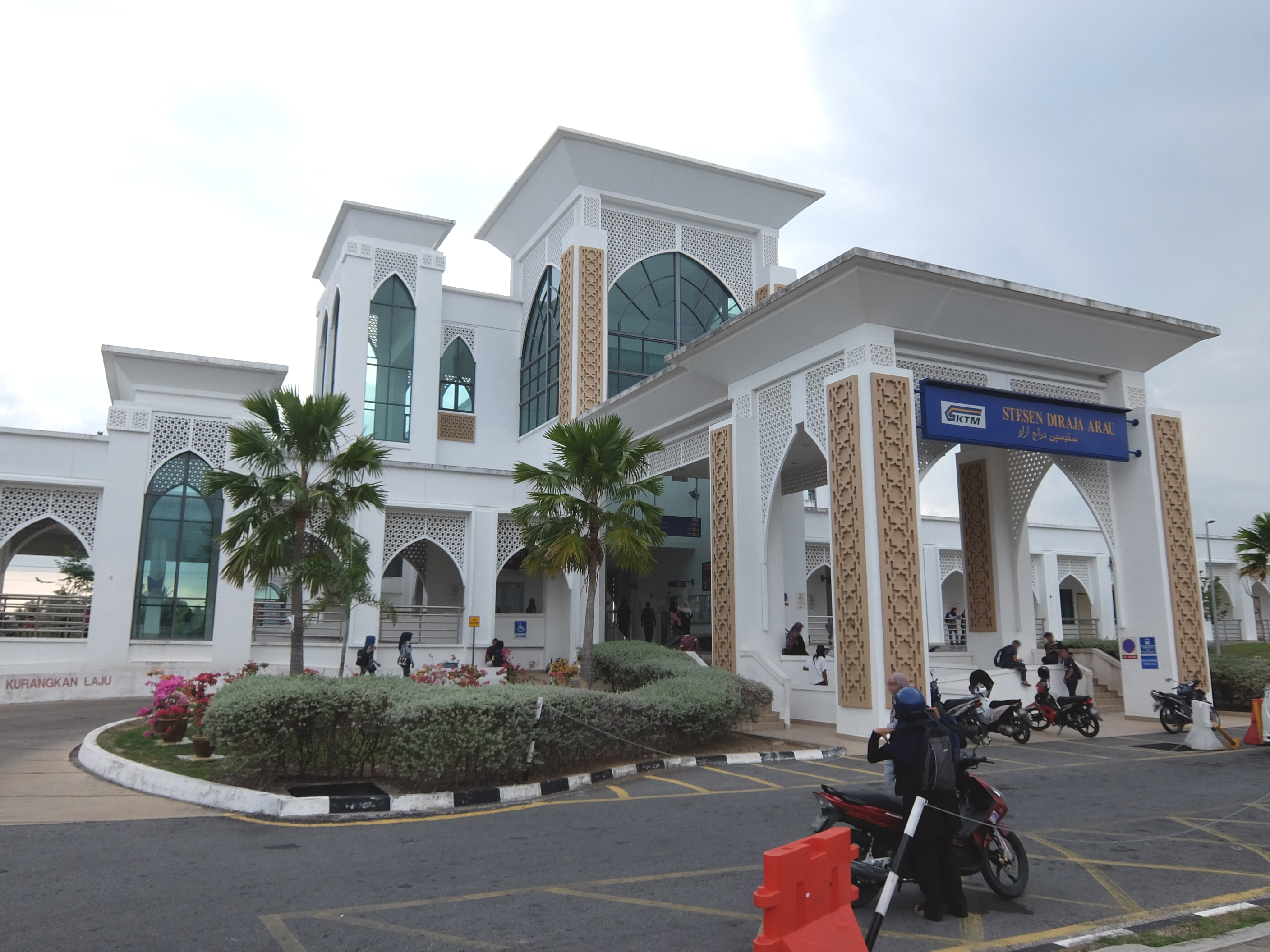
Arau railway station

- Arau railway station

=== Place of Worship ===
- Perlis State Mosque (مسجد نݢري ڤرليس)
- Arau muniswaran temple (அரவு முனீஸ்வரன் கோவில்)
- Sri Maha Mariamman Devasthana Sabha Temple (ஸ்ரீ மகா மாரியம்மன் தேவஸ்தான சபை ஆலயம்)
- Kuil Sree Veera Maha Batra Kali Amman (குயில் ஸ்ரீ வீர மகா பத்ர காளி அம்மன்)
- Wat Kampung Guar Nangka

== Politics ==
Arau has a federal constituency, that has been represented in the Dewan Rakyat since 1974. The federal constituency was created in the 1974 redistribution and is mandated to return a single member to the Dewan Rakyat under the first past the post voting system.

=== Representation history ===
Members of Parliament for Arau
Parliament	No	Years	Member	Party	Vote Share
Constituency created from Perlis Selatan and Perlis Utara
4th	P002	1974–1978	Syed Hassan Syed Mohamed (سيد حسن سيد محمد)	BN (UMNO)	14,789; 70.58%
5th	P002	1978–1982	Syed Hassan Syed Mohamed (سيد حسن سيد محمد)	BN (UMNO)	13,150; 54.16%
6th	P002	1982–1986	Abdul Hamid Pawanteh (عبدالحميد ڤاوانتيه)	BN (UMNO)	17,464; 63.60%
7th	P002	1986–1990	Shahidan Kassim (شهيدان كسسيم)	BN (UMNO)	18,156; 62.08%
8th	P002	1990–1995	Shahidan Kassim (شهيدان كسسيم)	BN (UMNO)	20,948; 61.43%
9th	P003	1995–1998	Kamarudin Ahmad (كامرودين احمد)	BN (UMNO)	16,266; 63.53%
9th	P003	1998–1999	Hashim Jasin (هشيم جاسين)	PAS	12,864; 52.71%
10th	P003	1999–2004	Mastika Junaidah Husin (مستيكا جنيده حسين)	BN (UMNO)	15,297; 52.73%
11th	P003	2004–2008	Syed Razlan Syed Putra Jamallullail (سيد رزلن سيد ڤوترا جماللوللايل)	BN (UMNO)	17,367; 55.15%
12th	P003	2008–2013	Ismail Kassim (اسماعيل كسسيم)	BN (UMNO)	16,451; 50.46%
13th	P003	2013–2018	Shahidan Kassim (شهيدان كسسيم)	BN (UMNO)	19,376; 51.28%
14th	P003	2018–2022	Shahidan Kassim (شهيدان كسسيم)	BN (UMNO)	16,547; 41.79%
15th	P003	2022–present	Shahidan Kassim (شهيدان كسسيم)	PN (PAS)	31,458; 67.23%

== Notable natives ==
- Azlan Man, Menteri Besar of Perlis from 2013 to 2022
- Hashim Jasin, Spiritual leader of the Malaysian Islamic Party

== See also ==
- House of Jamalullail (Perlis)
- Royal capitals of Malaysian states
