= House of Jamalullail (Perlis) =

Ruling house of Perlis

Raja of Perlis
- Raja Perlis راج ڤرليس
- State

Incumbent
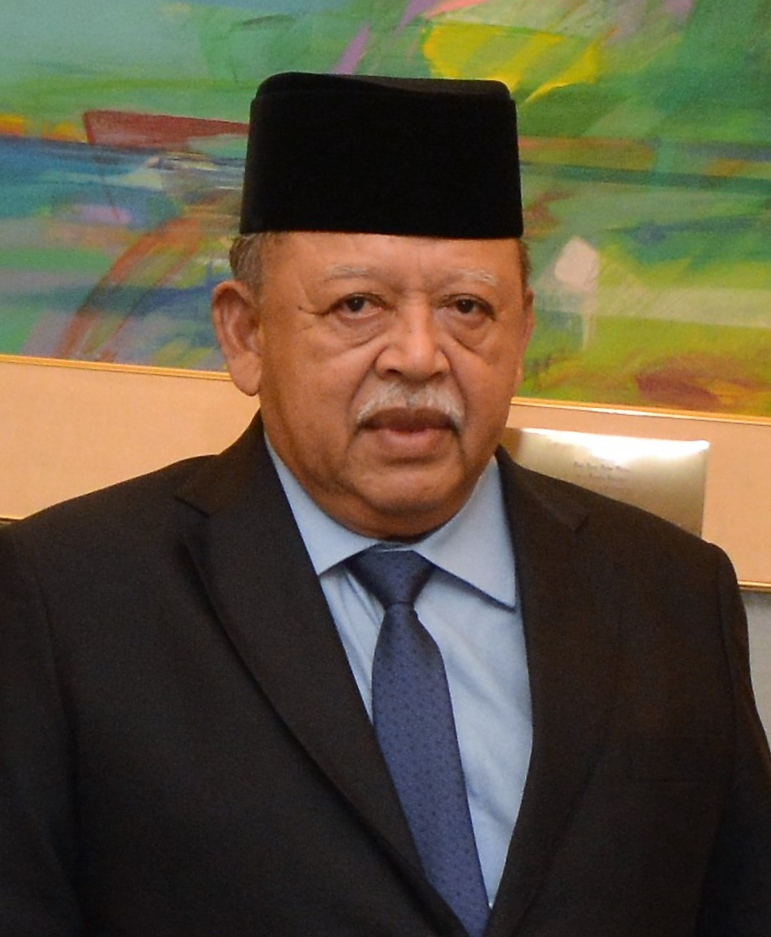
- Tuanku Syed Sirajuddin Jamalullail, 7th Raja of Perlis since 17 April 2000
- installation 7 May 2001

Details
- Style: His Royal Highness
- Heir apparent: Tuanku Syed Faizuddin Putra Jamalullail, 11th Crown Prince of Perlis
- First monarch: Raja Syed Hussain Jamalullail, 1st Raja of Perlis
- House: Jamalullail Perlis
- Formed: May 13, 1843; 183 years ago
- Residences: Istana Arau, Arau, Perlis, Malaysia

House of Jamalullail (Jamal Al-Layl)
- Parent house: Ba 'Alawi
- Country: Malaysia; Yemen; Indonesia; Thailand; Arab world
- Founded: 1797–present
- Founder: Tuan Syed Abu Bakar Harun Jamalullail, 1st Penghulu of Arau
- Current head: Tuanku Syed Sirajuddin Jamalullail, 7th Raja of Perlis
- Titles: Raja of Perlis; Regent of Perlis; Crown Prince of Perlis; Penghulu of Arau (1797–1843); Prince or Syed (men); Princess or Sharifah (woman); Habib (men); Habibah (woman); Jamalullail (surname)
- Estate: Perlis

The Raja of Perlis (Malay: Raja Perlis, Jawi: راج ڤرليس) is the constitutional monarch and head of state of the Malaysian state of Perlis. The royal house, known as the House of Jamalullail (Perlis), has been the ruling house of Perlis since 1843. The current ruler, Tuanku Syed Sirajuddin, has been the Raja of Perlis since 2000.

It was founded in 1843 together with the formation of the state of Perlis as a monarchy, after the Sultan of Kedah, Ahmad Tajuddin Halim Shah II gave his endorsement to the Jamalullail family for the secession of Perlis from Kedah with the Jamalullail family as its hereditary rulers.

Before the House of Jamalullail ascended to rule as the Rajas of Perlis, the most prominent title in Perlis was the Raja Muda or Yang di-Pertuan Muda of Perlis and Kedah (crown prince of Perlis and Kedah), a title comparable to Prince of Wales within the United Kingdom. Sultan Dhiauddin II of Kedah who built Kota Indera Kayangan as his capital was honorifically titled as Raja Muda of Perlis and Kedah. He was titled as such in a treaty to cede Province Wellesley.

The hereditary ruler of Perlis is also the head of its royal household. Unlike most of the other Malaysian states with their own hereditary rulers which are accorded with the title of sultan, the hereditary rulers of Perlis are accorded with the title of "raja". As with other rulers from other states in Malaysia, the Raja of Perlis participates in the election of the Yang di-Pertuan Agong and is qualified to serve a five-year term as the Yang di-Pertuan Agong if elected.

== History ==
=== Origins ===
The Jamalullail (جمل الليل; also pronounced Jamal Al-Layl in Arabic) clan was of Hadhrami Arab origin and founded as an offshoot from the greater Alawi lineage in the 15th century. The name "Jamal Al-Layl" is loosely translated into English as "Camel of the night"; a legend claims that its clan founder, Muhammad Jamal Al-Layl had a habit of wandering around at night to fill the wells and fountains of mosques. Members of the Jamal Al-Layl clan migrated to Madagascar, Zanzibar, India, Aceh, Comoros and Malaysia, where descendants of these migrants either rose to influential political positions or established ruling houses.

The ancestor of the Jamalullail clan of Perlis, Sayyid Ahmad bin Husayn Jamal Al-Layl, migrated to Kedah from Hadhramaut sometime in 1735 and married the daughter from an Arab-Malay family, Sharifah Aminah Al-Qadri. He settled in Chana village, which was on the border of Siam and Kedah at that time. He earned his living as a trader and was reportedly a well-respected figure in the state. Sayyid Ahmad's son with Sharifah Aminah, Sayyid Harun followed his father's footsteps as a trader, in addition to being a well-known religious scholar. He was later admitted into the Kedahan royal court and became a close aide of the Sultan of Kedah, Ahmad Tajuddin Halim Shah II. He later married a princess from the Kedah royal family, Tengku Safiah, and was later made the Penghulu (district chief) of Arau in 1797.

=== Establishment ===
When Siam invaded and occupied Kedah between 1821 and 1842, local Arab families supported the Sultan's efforts to lead resistance efforts against Siamese rule. Arab leaders employed a two-pronged approach of religious militancy and diplomacy to free Kedah from Siamese rule, among which the Jamal Al-Layl family played a leading role in these efforts and often carried out negotiations to persuade Siam to restore the state's independence. Siam later agreed to restore the Sultan of Kedah to his throne in 1842. The following year, Sayyid Hussein Jamal Al-Layl from Chana (now in Songkhla, Thailand) was installed by Siam as the first Raja of Perlis, after the Sultan of Kedah gave his endorsement of the formation of Perlis.

=== Succession dispute ===
In 1933, the fourth Raja of Perlis, Syed Alwi Jamalullail looked to the State Council to elect an heir presumptive to the royal throne of Perlis. The State Council chose Syed Hassan among several possible contenders as the heir-presumptive. Syed Hassan was a nephew by his older half-brother Syed Mahmud. An illness struck Syed Hassan the following year; he died shortly after that.

The State Council held another vote, and elected Syed Hassan's son, Syed Putra as the new heir presumptive. Another contender, Syed Hamzah, a younger half-brother of Syed Alwi and the Vice-President of the state council, dissented on the outcome of the choice as it went against Islamic inheritance laws. Raja Syed Alwi and the British maintained their support for Syed Putra, but as Syed Alwi fell ill at the outbreak of Pacific War in 1941, Syed Hamzah seized the opportunity to exert influence over the political affairs of the state. Following the death of Syed Alwi in 1943, Syed Hamzah was installed as the Raja of Perlis, with the support of the Japanese. When the British returned in 1945, Syed Hamzah abdicated under pressure from the British and moved in to install Syed Putra as the Raja of Perlis.

=== After World War II ===
The Raja of Perlis took part in the first Conference of Rulers and the first election of the Yang di-Pertuan Agong and his deputy in 1948 and 1957 respectively, both of which were also participated by the eight other Malayan states with hereditary rulers. In 1960, Syed Putra became the third Yang di-Pertuan Agong of Malaysia and served a five-year term from 1960 to 1965.

== List of penghulus of Arau (1797–1843) and rajas of Perlis (1843–present) ==
1. Tuan Syed Abu Bakar Harun Jamalullail (1797–1825)
2. Raja Syed Hussein Jamalullail (1825–1873) (independent Raja of Perlis c. 1843)
3. Raja Syed Ahmad Jamalullail (1873–1887)
4. Raja Syed Safi Jamalullail (1887–1905)
5. Raja Syed Alwi Jamalullail (1905–1943)
6. Raja Syed Hamzah Jamalullail (1943–1945) (abdicated)
7. Tuanku Syed Harun Putra Jamalullail (1945–2000)
8. Tuanku Syed Sirajuddin Jamalullail (2000–present)

== See also ==
- Monarchies of Malaysia
- Family tree of Perlis monarchs
- Family tree of Malaysian monarchs
