= List of Datuk titles =

This is a list of the titles related to Datuk, or its variant spelling Dato, Dato' or Datu, used in Brunei and Malaysia as titles which are conferred together with certain orders (darjah kebesaran). Dato (Brunei) is equivalent to the British "Sir" and Pehin (Brunei) is equivalent to the British "Lord". It may exist in itself as a single-word title, or as the prefix in a string of title such as "Dato Paduka" and "Datuk Seri Panglima". A female recipient on her own right generally receives the title whereby the word "Datuk" (or its variant spelling) is replaced with "Datin" instead. The wife of a Datuk holder also receives a title and it is typically "Datin" (regardless of the husband's full title); the husband of a female recipient does not receive any Datuk title.

== Usage ==
=== Brunei ===
In Brunei, only the variant spelling "Dato" (without apostrophe) is used.

List of Dato titles in Brunei
Title	Order (Class)	Post-nominals
Dato Hamzah Pahlawan	Order of Pahlawan Negara Brunei (Second Class)	DHPNB
Dato Laila	Order of Paduka Keberanian Laila Terbilang (Second Class)	DKLT
Dato Laila	Order of Paduka Laila Jasa Keberanian Gemilang (Second Class)	DLKG
Dato Laila Utama	Family Order of Laila Utama	DK
Dato Paduka	Order of Seri Paduka Mahkota Brunei (Second Class)	DPMB
Dato Paduka Seri	Order of Paduka Keberanian Laila Terbilang (First Class)	DPKT
Dato Paduka Seri	Order of Paduka Laila Jasa Keberanian Gemilang (First Class)	DPKG
Dato Paduka Seri Laila Jasa	Order of Paduka Seri Laila Jasa (First Class)	PSLJ
Dato Paduka Seri Setia	Order of Islam Brunei (First Class)	PSSUB
Dato Seri Laila Jasa	Order of Paduka Seri Laila Jasa (Second Class)	DSLJ
Dato Seri Paduka	Order of Seri Paduka Mahkota Brunei (First Class)	SPMB
Dato Seri Pahlawan	Order of Pahlawan Negara Brunei (First Class)	PSPNB
Dato Seri Setia	Order of Islam Brunei (Second Class)	DSSUB
Dato Seri Setia	Order of Setia Negara Brunei (First Class)	PSNB
Dato Seri Utama	Family Order of Seri Utama	DK
Dato Setia	Order of Setia Negara Brunei (Second Class)	DSNB

=== Malaysia ===
In Malaysia, the variant spellings "Datuk", "Dato'" (with apostrophe), "Dato" (without apostrophe) and "Datu" are used.

==== as "Datuk" ====
"Datuk" is conferred by the Yang di-Pertuan Agong, the federal sovereign of Malaysia, as well as the non-royal state leaders with the exception of Penang.

List of Datuk titles in Malaysia
Title	Order (Rank)	Name in Malay	Post-nominals	Type
Datuk	Order of Meritorious Service (Commander)	Darjah Yang Mulia Jasa Negara (Panglima Jasa Negara)	PJN	Federal
Datuk	Royal Family Order of Loyalty (Commander)	Darjah Yang Amat Dihormati Setia Diraja (Panglima Setia Diraja)	PSD	Federal
Datuk	Order of the Territorial Crown (Knight Commander)	Darjah Yang Mulia Mahkota Wilayah (Panglima Mahkota Wilayah)	PMW	Federal Territory
Datuk	Exalted Order of Malacca (Companion Class I)	Darjah Seri Melaka (Darjah Mulia Seri Melaka)	DMSM	State - Malacca
Datuk	Exalted Order of Malacca (Companion Class II)	Darjah Seri Melaka (Darjah Pangkuan Seri Melaka)	DPSM	State - Malacca
Datuk	Order of Kinabalu (Commander)	Darjah Yang Amat Mulia Kinabalu (Panglima Gemilang Darjah Kinabalu)	PGDK	State - Sabah
Datuk Amar	Order of the Star of Hornbill Sarawak (Knight Commander)	Darjah Yang Amat Mulia Bintang Kenyalang Sarawak (Datuk Amar Bintang Sarawak)	DA	State - Sarawak
Datuk Patinggi	Order of the Star of Hornbill Sarawak (Knight Grand Commander)	Darjah Yang Amat Mulia Bintang Kenyalang Sarawak (Datuk Patinggi Bintang Sarawak)	DP	State - Sarawak
Datuk Seri	Order of the Territorial Crown (Grand Commander)	Darjah Yang Mulia Mahkota Wilayah (Seri Mahkota Wilayah)	SMW	Federal Territory
Datuk Seri	Exalted Order of Malacca (Grand Commander)	Darjah Seri Melaka (Darjah Gemilang Seri Melaka)	DGSM	State - Malacca
Datuk Seri Panglima	Order of Kinabalu (Grand Commander)	Darjah Yang Amat Mulia Kinabalu (Seri Panglima Darjah Kinabalu)	SPDK	State - Sabah
Datuk Seri Utama	Order of the Territorial Crown (Grand Knight)	Darjah Yang Mulia Mahkota Wilayah (Seri Utama Mahkota Wilayah)	SUMW	Federal Territory
Datuk Seri Utama	Premier and Exalted Order of Malacca (Knight Grand Commander)	Darjah Utama Negeri Melaka (Darjah Utama Negeri Melaka)	DUNM	State - Malacca
Datuk Wira	Exalted Order of Malacca (Knight Commander)	Darjah Seri Melaka (Darjah Cemerlang Seri Melaka)	DCSM	State - Malacca

==== as "Dato'" ====
"Dato'" (with apostrophe) is conferred by the royal state leaders (the Sultans and Yamtuan Besar of Negeri Sembilan) as well as the non-royal state leader (Yang di-Pertua Negeri) of Penang.

List of Dato' titles in Malaysia
Title	Order (Rank)	Name in Malay	Post-nominals	Type
Dato'	Order of the Crown of Johor (Knight Grand Commander)	Darjah Mahkota Johor (Dato' Sri Paduka Mahkota Johor)	SPMJ	State - Johor
Dato'	Order of the Crown of Johor (Knight Commander)	Darjah Mahkota Johor (Dato' Paduka Mahkota Johor)	DPMJ	State - Johor
Dato'	Order of Loyalty of Sultan Ismail of Johor (Knight Grand Companion)	Darjah Setia Sultan Ismail Johor (Dato' Sri Setia Sultan Ismail Johor)	SSIJ	State - Johor
Dato'	Order of Loyalty of Sultan Ismail of Johor (Knight Companion)	Darjah Setia Sultan Ismail Johor (Setia Sultan Ismail Johor)	DSIJ	State - Johor
Dato'	Order of Sultan Ibrahim of Johor (Grand Knight)	Darjah Sultan Ibrahim Johor (Dato' Sri Mulia Sultan Ibrahim Johor)	SMIJ	State - Johor
Dato'	Order of Sultan Ibrahim of Johor (Knight)	Darjah Sultan Ibrahim Johor (Dato' Mulia Sultan Ibrahim Johor)	DMIJ	State - Johor
Dato'	Exalted Order of the Crown of Kedah (Knight Commander)	Darjah Yang Maha Mulia Sri Mahkota Kedah (Dato' Paduka Mahkota Kedah)	DPMK	State - Kedah
Dato'	Order of Loyalty to the Royal House of Kedah (Knight Companion)	Darjah Yang Mulia Setia Diraja (Dato' Setia DiRaja Kedah)	DSDK	State - Kedah
Dato'	Order of the Crown of Kelantan (Knight Grand Commander)	Darjah Kebesaran Mahkota Kelantan Yang Amat Mulia (Dato' Seri Paduka Mahkota Kelantan)	SPMK	State - Kelantan
Dato'	Order of the Crown of Kelantan (Knight Grand Commander)	Darjah Kebesaran Mahkota Kelantan Yang Amat Mulia (Dato' Paduka Mahkota Kelantan)	DPMK	State - Kelantan
Dato'	Order of the Life of the Crown of Kelantan (Knight Grand Commander)	Darjah Kebesaran Jiwa Mahkota Kelantan Yang Amat Mulia (Dato' Seri Paduka Jiwa Mahkota Kelantan)	SJMK	State - Kelantan
Dato'	Order of the Life of the Crown of Kelantan (Knight Commander)	Darjah Kebesaran Jiwa Mahkota Kelantan Yang Amat Mulia (Dato' Paduka Jiwa Mahkota Kelantan)	DJMK	State - Kelantan
Dato'	Order of the Loyalty to the Crown of Kelantan (Knight Grand Commander)	Darjah Kebesaran Setia Mahkota Kelantan Yang Amat Terbilang (Dato' Seri Paduka Setia Mahkota Kelantan)	SPSK	State - Kelantan
Dato'	Order of the Loyalty to the Crown of Kelantan (Knight Commander)	Darjah Kebesaran Setia Mahkota Kelantan Yang Amat Terbilang (Dato' Paduka Setia Mahkota Kelantan)	DPSK	State - Kelantan
Dato'	Order of the Noble Crown of Kelantan (Knight Grand Commander)	Darjah Kebesaran Kshatria Mahkota Kelantan Yang Amat Perkasa (Dato' Seri Paduka Kesateria Mahkota Kelantan)	SPKK	State - Kelantan
Dato'	Order of the Noble Crown of Kelantan (Knight Commander)	Darjah Kebesaran Kshatria Mahkota Kelantan Yang Amat Perkasa (Dato' Paduka Kesateria Mahkota Kelantan)	DPKK	State - Kelantan
Dato'	Order of the Services to the Crown of Kelantan (Knight Grand Commander)	Darjah Kebesaran Jasa Mahkota Kelantan (Dato' Seri Paduka Jasa Mahkota Kelantan)	SPJK	State - Kelantan
Dato'	Order of the Services to the Crown of Kelantan (Knight Commander)	Darjah Kebesaran Jasa Mahkota Kelantan (Dato' Paduka Jasa Mahkota Kelantan)	DPJK	State - Kelantan
Dato'	Order of Loyalty to Tuanku Muhriz (Knight of the Most Meritorious Loyal Order of Tuanku Muhriz)	Darjah Setia Tuanku Muhriz (Darjah Setia Tuanku Muhriz Yang Amat Terbilang)	DSTM	State - Negeri Sembilan
Dato'	Order of Loyal Service to Negeri Sembilan (Knight)	Darjah Setia Bakti Negeri Sembilan (Dato' Bakti Negeri Sembilan)	DBNS	State - Negeri Sembilan
Dato'	Grand Order of Tuanku Jaafar (Knight Commander)	Darjah Kebesaran Sri Tuanku Jaafar Yang Amat Terpuji (Dato' Paduka Tuanku Jaafar)	DPTJ	State - Negeri Sembilan
Dato'	Order of Sultan Ahmad Shah of Pahang (Knight Companion)	Darjah Kebesaran Sri Sultan Ahmad Shah Pahang Yang Amat Mulia (Darjah Sultan Ahmad Shah Pahang)	DSAP	State - Pahang
Dato'	Order of the Crown of Pahang (Knight Companion)	Darjah Kebesaran Mahkota Pahang Yang Amat Dihormati (Darjah Indera Mahkota Pahang)	DIMP	State - Pahang
Dato'	Order of Cura Si Manja Kini (Knight)	Darjah Kebesaran Negeri Perak Yang Amat Mulia Cura Si Manja Kini (Dato' Paduka Cura Si Manja Kini)	DPCM	State - Perak
Dato'	Order of the Perak State Crown (Knight Commander)	Darjah Kebesaran Mahkota Negeri Perak Yang Amat Mulia (Dato' Paduka Mahkota Perak)	DPMP	State - Perak
Dato'	Order of the Gallant Prince Syed Sirajuddin Jamalullail (Knight Commander)	Darjah Kebesaran Baginda Tuanku Syed Sirajuddin Jamalullail Yang Amat Dihormati (Dato' Setia Paduka Tuanku Syed Sirajuddin Jamalullail)	DSPJ	State - Perlis
Dato'	Order of Prince Syed Sirajuddin Jamalullail of Perlis (Knight Commander)	Darjah Kebesaran Tuanku Syed Sirajuddin Jamalullail Perlis (Dato' Panglima Sirajuddin Jamalullail)	DPSJ	State - Perlis
Dato'	Order of the Gallant Prince Syed Putra Jamalullail (Knight Companion)	Darjah Kebesaran Baginda Tuanku Syed Putra Jamalullail Yang Amat Dihormati (Dato' Setia Putra Jamalullail)	DSPJ	State - Perlis
Dato'	Order of the Gallant Prince Syed Putra Jamalullail (Knight Commander)	Darjah Kebesaran Baginda Tuanku Syed Putra Jamalullail Yang Amat Dihormati (Dato' Panglima Putra Jamalullail)	DPPJ	State - Perlis
Dato'	Order of the Crown of Perlis (Knight Commander)	Darjah Kebesaran Mahkota Perlis Yang Amat Mulia (Dato' Paduka Mahkota Perlis)	DPMP	State - Perlis
Dato'	Order of the Crown of Selangor (Knight Commander)	Darjah Kebesaran Mahkota Selangor Yang Amat Mulia (Dato' Paduka Mahkota Selangor)	DPMS	State - Selangor
Dato'	Order of Sultan Sharafuddin Idris Shah (Knight Companion)	Darjah Kebesaran Sultan Sharafuddin Idris Shah (Dato' Setia Sultan Sharafuddin Idris Shah)	DSIS	State - Selangor
Dato'	Order of Sultan Mizan Zainal Abidin of Terengganu (Knight Companion)	Darjah Kebesaran Sultan Mizan Zainal Abidin Terengganu Yang Amat Terpilih (Dato' Setia Sultan Mizan Zainal Abidin Terengganu)	DSMZ	State - Terengganu
Dato'	Order of Sultan Mahmud I of Terengganu (Member Knight Companion)	Darjah Kebesaran Sultan Mahmud I Terengganu Yang Amat Terpuji (Ahli Dato' Setia Sultan Mahmud I Terengganu)	DSMT	State - Terengganu
Dato'	Order of the Crown of Terengganu (Knight Grand Commander)	Darjah Kebesaran Mahkota Terengganu Yang Amat Mulia (Dato' Sri Paduka Mahkota Terengganu)	SPMT	State - Terengganu
Dato'	Order of the Crown of Terengganu (Knight Commander)	Darjah Kebesaran Mahkota Terengganu Yang Amat Mulia (Dato' Paduka Mahkota Terengganu)	DPMT	State - Terengganu
Dato'	Order of the Defender of State (Companion)	Darjah Pangkuan Negeri (Darjah Yang Mulia Pangkuan Negeri)	DMPN	State - Penang
Dato'	Order of the Defender of State (Officer)	Darjah Pangkuan Negeri (Darjah Setia Pangkuan Negeri)	DSPN	State - Penang
Dato' Indera	Order of the Crown of Pahang (Grand Knight)	Darjah Kebesaran Mahkota Pahang Yang Amat Dihormati (Sri Indera Mahkota Pahang)	SIMP	State - Pahang
Dato' Paduka	Order of Loyalty to Sultan Abdul Halim Mu'adzam Shah (Knight Commander)	Darjah Yang Mulia Seri Setia Sultan Abdul Halim Mu'adzam Shah (Dato' Paduka Seri Setia Sultan Abdul Halim Mu'adzam Shah)	DHMS	State - Kedah
Dato' Paduka	Order of the Gallant Prince Syed Sirajuddin Jamalullail (Knight Companion)	Darjah Kebesaran Baginda Tuanku Syed Sirajuddin Jamalullail Yang Amat Dihormati (Dato' Setia Tuanku Syed Sirajuddin Jamalullail)	DSSJ	State - Perlis
Dato' Pahlawan	Order of Taming Sari (Knight Commander)	Darjah Kebesaran Taming Sari Negeri Perak Yang Amat Perkasa (Dato' Pahlawan Taming Sari)	DPTS	State - Perak
Dato' Seri	Exalted Order of the Crown of Kedah (Knight Grand Commander)	Darjah Yang Maha Mulia Sri Mahkota Kedah (Dato' Seri Paduka Mahkota Kedah Yang Amat Dihormati)	SPMK	State - Kedah
Dato' Seri	Order of Loyalty to the Royal House of Kedah (Knight Grand Companion)	Darjah Yang Mulia Setia Diraja (Dato' Seri Setia Diraja Kedah Yang Amat Dihormati)	SSDK	State - Kedah
Dato' Seri	Order of Loyalty to Tuanku Muhriz (Grand Knight of the Most Conspicuous Loyal Order of Tuanku Muhriz)	Darjah Setia Tuanku Muhriz (Darjah Sri Setia Tuanku Muhriz Yang Amat Terbilang)	SSTM	State - Negeri Sembilan
Dato' Seri	Grand Order of Tuanku Jaafar (Knight Grand Commander)	Darjah Kebesaran Sri Tuanku Jaafar Yang Amat Terpuji (Dato' Sri Paduka Tuanku Jaafar)	SPTJ	State - Negeri Sembilan
Dato' Seri	Azlanii Royal Family Order (Grand Knight)	Darjah Yang Teramat Mulia Darjah Kerabat Azlanii (Darjah Kebesaran Dato' Seri Azlanii)	DSA	State - Pahang
Dato' Seri	Order of Cura Si Manja Kini (Grand Knight)	Darjah Kebesaran Negeri Perak Yang Amat Mulia Cura Si Manja Kini (Dato' Seri Paduka Cura Si Manja Kini)	SPCM	State - Perak
Dato' Seri	Order of the Perak State Crown (Knight Grand Commander)	Darjah Kebesaran Mahkota Negeri Perak Yang Amat Mulia (Dato' Seri Paduka Mahkota Perak)	SPMP	State - Perak
Dato' Seri	Order of the Crown of Perlis (Knight Grand Commander)	Darjah Kebesaran Mahkota Perlis Yang Amat Mulia (Seri Paduka Mahkota Perlis)	SPMP	State - Perlis
Dato' Seri	Order of the Crown of Selangor (Knight Grand Commander)	Darjah Kebesaran Mahkota Selangor Yang Amat Mulia (Dato' Sri Paduka Mahkota Selangor)	SPMS	State - Selangor
Dato' Seri	Order of Sultan Salahuddin Abdul Aziz Shah (Knight Grand Companion)	Darjah Kebesaran Sultan Salahuddin Abdul Aziz Shah (Knight Companion)	DSSA	State - Selangor
Dato' Seri	Order of Sultan Mizan Zainal Abidin of Terengganu (Knight Grand Companion)	Darjah Kebesaran Sultan Mizan Zainal Abidin Terengganu Yang Amat Terpilih (Dato' Sri Setia Sultan Mizan Zainal Abidin Terengganu)	SSMZ	State - Terengganu
Dato' Seri	Order of Sultan Mahmud I of Terengganu (Member Grand Companion)	Darjah Kebesaran Sultan Mahmud I Terengganu Yang Amat Terpuji (Ahli Sri Setia Sultan Mahmud I Terengganu)	SSMT	State - Terengganu
Dato' Seri	Order of the Defender of State (Knight Commander)	Darjah Pangkuan Negeri (Darjah Panglima Pangkuan Negeri)	DPPN	State - Penang
Dato' Seri	Order of the Defender of State (Commander)	Darjah Pangkuan Negeri (Darjah Gemilang Pangkuan Negeri)	DGPN	State - Penang
Dato' Seri Diraja	Order of Loyalty to Sultan Abdul Halim Mu'adzam Shah (Grand Commander)	Darjah Yang Mulia Seri Setia Sultan Abdul Halim Mu'adzam Shah (Dato' Seri Setia Sultan Abdul Halim Mu'adzam Shah)	SHMS	State - Kedah
Dato' Seri Diraja	Perak Family Order of Sultan Azlan Shah (ordinary class)	Darjah Kerabat Sri Paduka Sultan Azlan Shah Perak Yang Amat Dihormati (Dato' Seri Paduka Sultan Azlan Shah Perak Yang Amat Dimulia)	SPSA	State - Perak
Dato' Seri Diraja	Perak Family Order of Sultan Nazrin Shah (ordinary class)	Darjah Kerabat Sri Paduka Sultan Nazrin Shah Perak Yang Amat Dihormati (Dato' Seri Paduka Sultan Nazrin Shah)	SPSN	State - Perak
Dato' Seri Diraja	Order of the Gallant Prince Syed Sirajuddin Jamalullail (Knight Grand Companion)	Darjah Kebesaran Baginda Tuanku Syed Sirajuddin Jamalullail Yang Amat Dihormati (Seri Setia Tuanku Syed Sirajuddin Jamalullail)	SSSJ	State - Perlis
Dato' Seri Diraja	Order of the Gallant Prince Syed Putra Jamalullail (Knight Grand Companion)	Darjah Kebesaran Baginda Tuanku Syed Putra Jamalullail Yang Amat Dihormati (Setia Tuanku Syed Putra Jamalullail)	SSPJ	State - Perlis
Dato' Seri DiRaja Bendahara Negara	Order of Dato' Bendahara Sri Jamalullail	Darjah Kebesaran Dato' Bendahara Sri Jamalullail	DBSJ	State - Perlis
Dato' Seri Panglima	Order of Taming Sari (Knight Grand Commander)	Darjah Kebesaran Taming Sari Negeri Perak Yang Amat Perkasa (Dato' Seri Panglima Taming Sari)	SPTS	State - Perak
Dato' Seri Setia DiRaja	Order of Prince Syed Sirajuddin Jamalullail of Perlis (Knight Grand Companion)	Darjah Kebesaran Tuanku Syed Sirajuddin Jamalullail Perlis (Setia Paduka Tuanku Syed Sirajuddin Jamalullail)	SPSJ	State - Perlis
Dato' Seri Utama	Supreme Order of Sri Mahawangsa	Darjah Utama Sri Mahawangsa Kedah	DMK	State - Kedah
Dato' Seri Utama	Order of Sultan Mizan Zainal Abidin of Terengganu (Supreme Class)	Darjah Kebesaran Sultan Mizan Zainal Abidin Terengganu Yang Amat Terpilih (Sri Utama Sultan Mizan Zainal Abidin Terengganu)	SUMZ	State - Terengganu
Dato' Seri Utama	Order of the Defender of State (Knight Grand Commander)	Darjah Pangkuan Negeri (Darjah Utama Pangkuan Negeri)	DUPN	State - Penang
Dato' Setia	Order of Sultan Sharafuddin Idris Shah (Knight Grand Companion)	Darjah Kebesaran Sultan Sharafuddin Idris Shah (Dato' Setia Sultan Sharafuddin Idris Shah)	SSIS	State - Selangor
Dato' Sri	Order of Sultan Ahmad Shah of Pahang (Grand Knight)	Darjah Kebesaran Sri Sultan Ahmad Shah Pahang Yang Amat Mulia (Sri Sultan Ahmad Shah Pahang)	SSAP	State - Pahang
Dato' Sri Diraja	Grand Royal Order of Sultan Ahmad Shah of Pahang (Grand Royal Knight)	Darjah Sri Diraja Sultan Ahmad Shah Pahang (Sri Diraja Sultan Ahmad Shah Pahang)	SDSA	State - Pahang
Dato' Wira	Glorious Order of the Crown of Kedah (Knight Commander)	Darjah Kebesaran Gemilang Sri Mahkota Kedah (Dato' Wira Gemilang Mahkota Kedah)	DGMK	State - Kedah
Dato' Wira	Order of Prince Syed Sirajuddin Jamalullail of Perlis (Grand Hero)	Darjah Kebesaran Tuanku Syed Sirajuddin Jamalullail of Perlis (Dato' Wira Tuanku Syed Sirajuddin Jamalullail)	DWSJ	State - Perlis

==== as "Dato" ====
"Dato" (without apostrophe) is only conferred by the Yang di-Pertua Negeri of Sarawak for certain ranks of the Most Exalted Order of the Star of Sarawak.

Title	Order (Rank)	Name in Malay	Post-nominals
Dato	Most Exalted Order of the Star of Sarawak (Commander)	Darjah Utama Yang Amat Mulia Bintang Sarawak (Panglima Setia Bintang Sarawak)	PSBS
Dato Sri	Most Exalted Order of the Star of Sarawak (Grand Commander)	Darjah Utama Yang Amat Mulia Bintang Sarawak (Panglima Negara Bintang Sarawak)	PNBS

==== as "Datu" ====
"Datu" is only conferred by the Yang di-Pertua Negeri of Sarawak for the Order of Meritorious Service to Sarawak.

Title	Order	Name in Malay	Post-nominals
Datu	Order of Meritorious Service to Sarawak	Darjah Jasa Bakti Sarawak	DJBS

== See also ==
- Malay styles and titles
