= List of post-nominal letters (Perlis) =

Honorific order of the Sultanate of Perlis

This is a list of post-nominal letters used in Perlis. The order in which they follow an individual's name is the same as the order of precedence for the wearing of order insignias, decorations, and medals. When applicable, non-hereditary titles are indicated.

Grades		Post-nominal	Title	Wive's title	Ribbon
The Most Esteemed Royal Family Order of Perlis (17/05/2001) - Darjah Kerabat Diraja Perlis Yang Amat Dihormati
Member	Darjah Kerabat Diraja Perlis	D.K.P.	--	--	
The Most Esteemed Perlis Family Order of the Gallant Prince Syed Putra Jamalullail (21/09/1965) Darjah Kerabat Perlis Baginda Tuanku Syed Putra Jamalullail Yang Amat Dihormati
Member	Darjah Kerabat Perlis	D.K.	--	--	
The Order of Dato' Bendahara Sri Jamalullail (2006) - Darjah Kebesaran Dato' Bendahara Sri Jamalullail
--	Dato' Bendahara Seri Jamalullail	D.B.S.J.	Dato' Seri DiRaja Bendahara Negara	--	
The Most Esteemed Order of the Gallant Prince Syed Sirajuddin Jamalullail (2001) Darjah Kebesaran Baginda Tuanku Syed Sirajuddin Jamalullail Yang Amat Dihormati
Knight Grand Companion	Seri Setia Tuanku Syed Sirajuddin Jamalullail	S.S.S.J.	Dato' Seri Diraja	--	
Knight Companion	Dato' Setia Tuanku Syed Sirajuddin Jamalullail	D.S.S.J.	Dato' Paduka	Datin Paduka	
Knight Commander	Dato' Setia Paduka Tuanku Syed Sirajuddin Jamalullail	D.S.P.J.	Dato'	Datin	
The Order of Prince Syed Sirajuddin Jamalullail of Perlis (2005) Darjah Kebesaran Tuanku Syed Sirajuddin Jamalullail Perlis
Knight Grand Companion	Setia Paduka Tuanku Syed Sirajuddin Jamalullail	S.P.S.J.	Dato' Seri Setia DiRaja	Datin Seri Setia DiRaja	
Grand Hero	Dato' Wira Tuanku Syed Sirajuddin Jamalullail	D.W.S.J.	Dato' Wira	Datin Wira	
Knight Commander	Dato' Panglima Sirajuddin Jamalullail	D.P.S.J.	Dato'	Datin	
Companion	Sri Sirajuddin Jamalullail Perlis	S.S.P.	--	--	
The Most Esteemed Order of the Gallant Prince Syed Putra Jamalullail (22/06/1995) Darjah Kebesaran Baginda Tuanku Syed Putra Jamalullail Yang Amat Dihormati
Knight Grand Companion	Setia Tuanku Syed Putra Jamalullail	S.S.P.J.	Dato' Seri Diraja	Datin Seri Diraja	
Knight Companion	Dato' Setia Putra Jamalullail	D.S.P.J.	Dato'	Datin	
Knight Commander	Dato' Panglima Putra Jamalullail	D.P.P.J.	Dato'	Datin	
The Most Illustrious Order of the Crown of Perlis, the Star of Safi (21/09/1965) Darjah Kebesaran Mahkota Perlis Yang Amat Mulia, Bintang al-Safi
Knight Grand Commander	Seri Paduka Mahkota Perlis	S.P.M.P.	Dato' Seri	Datin Seri	
Knight Commander	Dato' Paduka Mahkota Perlis	D.P.M.P.	Dato'	Datin	
Companion	Setia Mahkota Perlis	S.M.P.	--	--	
Member	Ahli Mahkota Perlis	A.M.P.	--	--	
Silver Medal	Pingat Mahkota Perlis	P.M.P.	--	--	
The Order for Dato' Titleholders - Darjah Dato' Bergelar
Decoration : Silver-gilt badge enamelled in blue on a sash	Darjah Dato' Bergelar	--	Dato' Kurnia Bakti; Dato' Indera Perkasa; Dato' Indera Dewa; Dato' Indera Jaya; Dato' Indera Pahlawan; Dato' Alim Panglima; Dato' Kaya Bakti; Dato' Setia Jaya; Dato' Alim Setia; Dato' Lela Perkasa; Dato' Arif Perkasa; Dato' Murshid Diraja	--	
Conspicuous Gallantry Medal - Pingat Keberanian Handal
Silver Medal	Pingat Keberanian Handal	P.K.H.	--	--	
Distinguished Conduct Medal - Pingat Pekerti Terpilih
Bronze Medal	Pingat Pekerti Terpilih	P.P.T.	--	--	
Meritorious Service Medal - Pingat Jasa Kebaktian
Bronze Medal	Pingat Jasa Kebaktian	P.J.K.	--	--	
Meritorious Conduct Medal - Pingat Jasa Baik
Bronze Medal	Pingat Jasa Baik	P.J.B.	--	--	
Long Service Medal - Pingat Perkhidmatan Lama
Silver Medal	Pingat Perkhidmatan Lama	P.P.L.	--	--	
Justice of the Peace - Jaksa Pendamai
	Jaksa Pendamai	J.P.	--	--	None
Installation Medal 2001 - Pingat Pertabalan 2001
Silver Medal	Pingat Pertabalan 2001	--	--	--	
10th Reign Anniversary Medal - Pingat Peringatan 10 Tahun Pemerintahan
Silver Medal	Pingat Peringatan 10 Tahun Pemerintahan	--	--	--	
Silver Jubilee Medal 2025 - Pingat Jubli Perak 2025
Silver Medal	Pingat Jubli Perak 2025	--	--	--	

== See also ==
- Orders, decorations, and medals of Perlis
- Order of precedence in Perlis
