= Azhar Mansor =

Malaysian sailor

Yang Berbahagia Datuk Azhar Mansor DPPJ
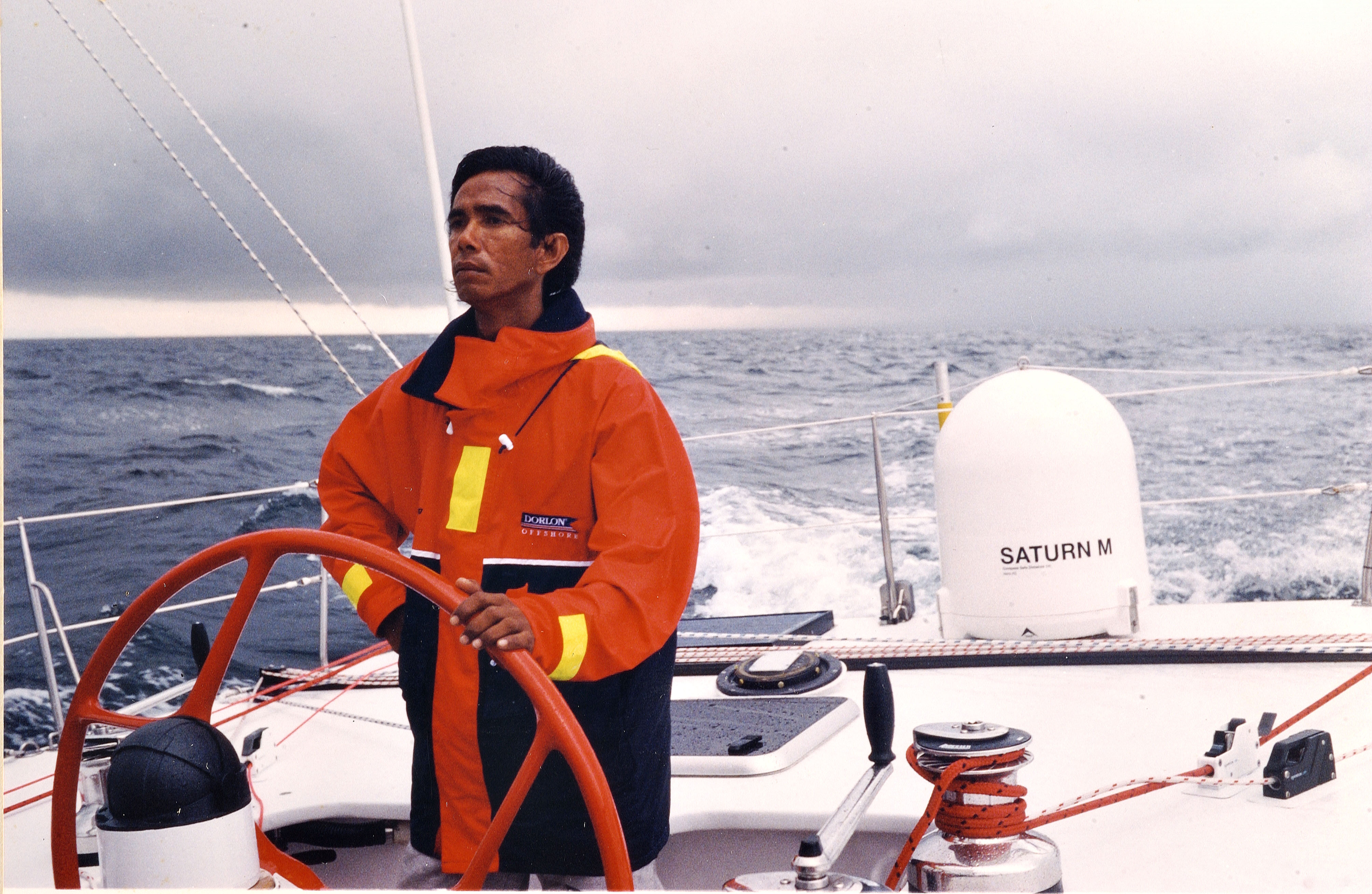
- Azhar sailing his yacht Jalur Gemilang in 1999
- Born: 11 February 1958 (age 67); Perlis, Federation of Malaya (now Malaysia)
- Occupation: Sailor
- Years active: 1998–present
- Known for: The first Malaysian to complete a solo circumnavigation of the globe on sailing yacht Jalur Gemilang.
- Awards: Performance Certificate from WSSR (World Speed Sailing Record Council) for Round the World, assisted, (stops,) eastabout, single-handed.

Yang Berbahagia Datuk Azhar Mansor (born 11 February 1958) is the first Malaysian to sail solo around the world. He made his trip in 1999, sailing the ship Jalur Gemilang. His round the world trip, with stops, took 190 days, 6 hours 57 minutes and 2 seconds

== Honour ==
- Perlis
  - Knight Commander of the Order of the Gallant Prince Syed Putra Jamalullail (DPPJ) – Dato' (1999)

== Successes ==
Datuk Azhar has managed to set a new world record via an East about route, attempted by no-one and has been verified by the WSSRC (World Speed Sailing Record Council) as an official record.

Azhar is currently based in Langkawi managing Telaga Harbour Park, one of Malaysia's finest marinas.
