= Order of the Most Valiant Warrior =

Honorific order of the Sultanate of Kelantan

Order of the Most Valiant Warrior Darjah Pahlawan Yang Amat Gagah Perkasa

Awarded by Sultan of Kelantan
- Type: Order
- Established: 9 August 1919
- Royal house: House of Long Yunus
- Ribbon: Maroon
- Status: Currently constituted
- Founder: Muhammad IV of Kelantan
- Sovereign: Muhammad V of Kelantan
- Grades: Grand Recipient
- Post-nominals: PYGB

Precedence
- Next (higher): Knight Grand Commander of Order of the Services to the Crown of Kelantan
- Next (lower): Knight Commander of Order of the Crown of Kelantan
- Ribbon bar of the order

The Order of the Most Valiant Warrior (Malay: Darjah Pahlawan Yang Amat Gagah Perkasa Yang Amat Mulia) is an honorific order of the Sultanate of Kelantan.

== History ==
The order was established on 9 August 1919 as a recognition for those who have shown acts of supreme gallantry and valour. It is awarded in one class and does not carry any title.

== Notable recipients ==
- 1988: Mohamed Salleh Abas
- 1995: Eusoffe Abdoolcader
- 2010: Musa Hassan
- 2026: Farhash Wafa Salvador

== See also ==
- Orders, decorations, and medals of the Malaysian states and federal territories#Kelantan
- Orders, decorations, and medals of Kelantan
- List of post-nominal letters (Kelantan)
