= Orders, decorations, and medals of Perlis =

Honorific order of the Sultanate of Perlis

The following is the orders, decorations, and medals given by Raja of Perlis. When applicable, post-nominal letters and non-hereditary titles are indicated.

== Order of precedence for the wearing of order insignias, decorations, and medals ==
Precedence:

1.
Darjah Kerabat DiRaja Perlis
D.K.P.
--
left shoulder
2.
Darjah Kerabat Baginda Tuanku Syed Putra Jamalullail
D.K.
--
left shoulder
3.
Darjah Dato' Bendahara Seri Jamalullail
D.B.S.J.
Dato’ Seri DiRaja Bendahara Negara

4.
Darjah Setia Tuanku Syed Putra Jamalullail
S.S.P.J.
Dato’ Seri Diraja
5.
Darjah Seri Setia Tuanku Syed Sirajuddin Jamalullail
S.S.S.J.
Dato’ Seri Diraja
6.
Darjah Setia Paduka Tuanku Syed Sirajuddin Jamalullail
S.P.S.J.
Dato’ Seri Setia DiRaja
7.
Darjah Seri Paduka Mahkota Perlis
S.P.M.P.
Dato’ Seri

8.
Darjah Dato' Setia Tuanku Syed Sirajuddin Jamalullail
D.S.S.J.
Dato’ Paduka
9.
Darjah Dato' Wira Tuanku Syed Sirajuddin Jamalullail
D.W.S.J.
Dato’ Wira
10.
Darjah Dato' Paduka Mahkota Perlis
D.P.M.P.
Dato’
11.
Darjah Dato' Setia Paduka Tuanku Syed Sirajuddin Jamalullail
D.S.P.J.
Dato’

12.
Darjah Dato' Panglima Putra Jamalullail
D.P.P.J.
Dato’
13.
Darjah Dato' Panglima Sirajuddin Jamalullail
D.P.S.J.
Dato’

14.
The Order for Dato’ Titleholders
Darjah Dato’ Bergelar
for :

- Dato’ Kurnia Bakti
- Dato’ Indera Perkasa
- Dato’ Indera Dewa
- Dato’ Indera Jaya
- Dato’ Indera Pahlawan
- Dato’ Lela Perkasa
- Dato’ Alim Panglima
- Dato’ Kaya Bakti
- Dato’ Setia Jaya
- Dato’ Alim Setia

15.
Darjah Setia Mahkota Perlis
S.M.P.
--

16.
Darjah Seri Sirajuddin Perlis
S.S.P.
--
17.
Darjah Ahli Mahkota Perlis
A.M.P.
--

18.
Pingat Mahkota Perlis
P.M.P.
--

19.
Pingat Keberanian Handal
P.K.H.
--
20.
Pingat Pekerti Terpilih
P.P.T.
--
21.
Pingat Jasa Kebaktian
P.J.K.
--
22.
Pingat Jasa Baik
P.J.B.
--
23.
Pingat Perkhidmatan Lama
P.P.L.
--
24.
Jaksa Pendamai
J.P.
--

== Orders, decorations, and medals ==
The Most Esteemed Royal Family Order of Perlis - Darjah Kerabat Diraja Perlis Yang Amat Dihormati

- Founded by Raja Syed Sirajuddin on 17 May 2001.
- Awarded in a single class, without any title attached and at the personal discretion of the ruler - D.K.P.

The Most Esteemed Perlis Family Order of the Gallant Prince Syed Putra Jamalullail - Darjah Kerabat Perlis Tuanku Syed Putra Jamalullail Yang Amat Dihormati

- Founded by Raja Syed Putra on 21 September 1965 as a family order limited to members of the Perlis and allied Royal families.
- Awarded in a single class, Darjah Kerabat - D.K.

The Order of Dato’ Bendahara Sri Jamalullail - Darjah Kebesaran Dato’ Bendahara Sri Jamalullail

- Founded by Raja Syed Sirajuddin in 2006 as a special decoration of honour for distinguished statesmen.
- Awarded in a single class with the personal title of Dato’ Sri Diraja Bendahara Negara - D.B.S.J.

The Most Esteemed Order of the Gallant Prince Syed Sirajuddin Jamalullail - Darjah Kebesaran Tuanku Syed Sirajuddin Jamalullail Yang Amat Dihormati

- Founded by Raja Syed Sirajuddin in 2001
- Awarded in three classes :
  - 1. Grand Companion S.S.S.J.
  - 2. Companion D.S.S.J.
  - 3. Lieutenant - D.S.P.J.

The Order of Prince Syed Sirajuddin Jamalullail of Perlis - Darjah Kebesaran Tuanku Syed Sirajuddin Jamalullail Perlis

- Founded by Raja Syed Sirajuddin in 2005
- Awarded in four classes :
  - 1. Grand Companion - S.P.S.J.
  - 2. Companion - D.W.S.J.
  - 3. Lieutenant - D.P.S.J.
  - 4. Officer - S.S.P.

The Most Esteemed Order of the Gallant Prince Syed Putra Jamalullail - Darjah Kebesaran Tuanku Syed Putra Jamalullail Yang Amat Dihormati

- Founded by Raja Syed Putra on 22 June 1995.
- Awarded in three classes :
  - 1. Grand Companion - S.S.P.J.
  - 2. Companion - D.S.P.J.
  - 3. Lieutenant - D.P.P.J.

Made obsolete in 2001 but appointments revived in 2007.

The Most Honourable Order of the Crown of Perlis - Darjah Kebesaran Mahkota Perlis Yang Amat Mulia

- Founded by Raja Syed Putra on 21 September 1965.
- Awarded in five classes :
  - 1. Grand Commander - S.P.M.P.
  - 2. Commander - D.P.M.P.
  - 3. Companion - S.M.P.
  - 4. Member - A.M.P.
  - 5. A silver medal (Pingat - P.M.P.) was instituted on 22 June 1995 to recognise the services of grade 3 departmental heads and community leaders of equivalent rank.

The Order for Dato’ Titleholders - Darjah Dato’ Bergelar

- Founded by Raja Syed Putra on 27 December 1987 to accompany the award of certain titular honours, namely:

- Dato’ Kurnia Bakti
- Dato’ Indera Perkasa
- Dato’ Indera Dewa
- Dato’ Indera Jaya
- Dato’ Indera Pahlawan
- Dato’ Lela Perkasa
- Dato’ Alim Panglima
- Dato’ Kaya Bakti
- Dato’ Setia Jaya
- Dato’ Alim Setia

Awarded in a single class, a silver-gilt badge enamelled in blue suspended from a broad, blue, silk riband with a gold central band, worn in the same manner as the sash of a grand cross.

Conspicuous Gallantry Medal - Pingat Keberanian Handal

- Instituted by Raja Syed Putra on 9 May 1951 to reward conspicuous acts of gallantry of the highest order.
- Awarded in a single class, a silver medal - P.K.H.

Distinguished Conduct Medal - Pingat Pekerti Terpilih

- Instituted by Raja Syed Putra on 9 May 1951 as a reward for distinguished conduct.
- Awarded in a single class, a bronze medal - P.P.T.

Meritorious Service Medal - Pingat Jasa Kebaktian

- Instituted by Raja Syed Putra on 9 May 1951 as a reward for meritorious services in state employ, for those employed in state service in civil service grades three to seven.
- Awarded in a single class, a bronze medal - P.J.K.

Meritorious Conduct Medal - Pingat Jasa Baik

- Instituted by Raja Syed Putra on 30 May 1968 as a reward for meritorious conduct in state employ, for those employed in state service in civil service grades eight to eleven.
- Awarded in a single class, a bronze medal - P.J.B.

Long Service Medal - Pingat Perkhidmatan Lama

- Instituted by Raja Syed Putra on 4 July 1962 as a reward for twenty-five years of long service in state employ.
- Awarded in a single class, a silver medal - P.P.L.

== See also ==
- Orders, decorations, and medals of the Malaysian states and federal territories#Perlis
- List of post-nominal letters (Perlis)
