= Order of the Gallant Prince Syed Sirajuddin Jamalullail =

Series of awards of an order of chivalry of Malaysia

The Most Esteemed Order of the Gallant Prince Syed Sirajuddin Jamalullail

Awarded by the Raja of Perlis
- Type: Dynastic order of merit
- Established: 2001; 25 years ago
- Status: Currently constituted
- Founder: Sirajuddin of Perlis
- Grand Master: Sirajuddin of Perlis
- Grades: Grand Companion (SSSJ); Companion (DSSJ); Lieutenant (DSPJ)
- Post-nominals: S.S.S.J.; D.S.S.J.; D.S.P.J.

Statistics
- First induction: 1996
- Last induction: 2013
- Total inductees: 28

Precedence
- Next (higher): Order of the Gallant Prince Syed Putra Jamalullail
- Next (lower): Order of Prince Syed Sirajuddin Jamalullail of Perlis
- Grand Companion Companion Lieutenant; Ribbon bars

The Most Esteemed Order of the Gallant Prince Syed Sirajuddin Jamalullail is a Malaysian dynastic order of merit founded by Sirajuddin of Perlis in 2001.

The Order consists of the Grand Master (currently Sirajuddin) and three Classes of members:

- Grand Companion
- Companion
- Lieutenant

Members belong to either the Civil or the Military Division. Recipients of the Order are usually senior politicians or senior civil servants. Commonwealth citizens who are not subjects of the Raja and foreign nationals may be made Honorary Members.

The Order of the Gallant Prince Syed Sirajuddin Jamalullail is the fifth-most senior of the Perlis Orders of Merit, after Royal Family Order of Perlis, Perlis Family Order of the Gallant Prince Syed Putra Jamalullail, Order of Dato’ Bendahara Sri Jamalullail and Order of the Gallant Prince Syed Putra Jamalullail.

== Composition ==
=== Grand Master ===
The Perlis Sovereign is the Grand Master of the Order of the Gallant Prince Syed Sirajuddin Jamalullail. As with all honours except those in the Grand Master's personal gift, the Grand Master makes all appointments to the Order on the advice of the Government.

== Precedence and privileges ==
Members of the Order of the Gallant Prince Syed Sirajuddin Jamalullail are assigned positions in the order of precedence. (See order of precedence in Perlis for the exact positions.)

Knights Grand Companion prefix "Dato' Seri Diraja", Knights Companion prefix "Dato' Paduka", to their forenames. Wives of Knights Grand Companion and Knights Companion may prefix "Datin Seri Diraja" and "Datin Paduka" to their surnames respectively, but no equivalent privilege exists for husbands. Knights Commander prefix "Dato'" to their forenames. Wives of Knights Commander may prefix "Datin" to their surnames, but again, no equivalent privilege exists for husbands.

Knights Grand Companion use the post-nominal "SSSJ"; Knights Companion use "DSSJ"; Knights Commander use "DSPJ".

== Revocation ==
It is possible for membership in the Order to be revoked. Since its inception, however, no recipient has had their award revoked.

== Recipients ==
- Grand Master: Tuanku Syed Sirajuddin ibni Almarhum Tuanku Syed Putra Jamalullail

=== Knight Grand Companion (S.S.S.J.) ===
- 2001: Abdullah Ahmad Badawi
- 2007: Najib Razak

=== Knight Companion (D.S.S.J.) ===
- 2003: Mohammad Yaacob Azizul Hassan
- 2013: Syed Mashafuddin Syed Badarudin Jamalullail
