= Order of precedence in Perlis =

Relative preeminence of officials for ceremonial purposes

The Perlis order of precedence is a nominal and symbolic hierarchy of important positions within the state of Perlis. It has no legal standing but is used to dictate ceremonial protocol at events of a state nature.

== Order of precedence ==
No.	Description
1	His Royal Highness The Raja
2	Her Royal Highness The Raja Perempuan
3	His Highness The Raja Muda
4	Her Highness The Raja Puan Muda
5	The Right Honourable the Menteri Besar
6	His Honour the Judge
7	Honourable Speaker of the Legislative Assembly
8	Their Highnesses Princes and Princesses
9	Honourable State Secretary
10	Honourable State Legal Adviser
11	Honourable State Financial Officer
12	Honourable Members of the Executive Council
13	Members of the Most Esteemed Royal Family Order of Perlis (DK)
14	Grand Commanders of the Most Illustrious Order of the Crown of Perlis (SPMP)
15	Commanders of the Most Illustrious Order of the Crown of Perlis (DPMP)
16	the Dato' Bergelar
17	Honourable Members of the Legislative Assembly
18	Chairperson of the State Islamic and Malay Affairs Council
19	State Mufti
20	Honourable Senators
21	Honourable Members of the House of Representatives
22	Companions of the Most Illustrious Order of the Crown of Perlis (SMP)
23	President of Kangar Municipal Council
24	Head of Departments
25	Justices of the Peace
26	Headmen
27	Members of Kangar Municipal Council
28	Recipients of State honours
29	Recipients of Federal honours

== See also ==
- List of post-nominal letters (Perlis)
