= Order of the Services to the Crown of Kelantan =

Honorific order of the Sultanate of Kelantan

Order of the Services to the Crown of Kelantan Darjah Kebesaran Jasa Mahkota Kelantan

Awarded by Sultan of Kelantan
- Type: Order
- Established: 15 May 2016
- Royal house: House of Long Yunus
- Ribbon: Sky blue; White; Royal yellow
- Motto: Berserah Kepada Tuhan (Note: Jawi: برسره كڤد توه‍ن) (Trust in God)
- Status: Currently constituted
- Founder: Muhammad V of Kelantan
- Sovereign: Muhammad V of Kelantan
- Grades: Knight Grand Commander; Knight Commander; Commander; Officer; Member
- Post-nominals: SPJK; DPJK; PJK; BJK; AJK

Precedence
- Next (higher): Order of Loyalty to the Crown of Kelantan
- Next (lower): Order of the Most Valiant Warrior
- Ribbon bar of Knight Grand Commander Ribbon bar of Knight Commander Ribbon bar of lower classes

The Most Loyal Order of the Services to the Crown of Kelantan or the Star of Petra (Malay: Darjah Kebesaran Jasa Mahkota Kelantan Yang Amat Setia or Bintang Al-Petrawi) is an honorific order of the Sultanate of Kelantan.

The orders were established on 15 May 2016 and first conferred on 12 November 2016 as recognition a distinguished service in civil uniformed service for the nation and the state of Kelantan.

== Order ranks ==
The order has five ranks:

=== Knight Grand Commander ===
Knight Grand Commander of the Order of the Services to the Crown of Kelantan (S.P.J.K.) (Malay: Darjah Seri Paduka Jasa Mahkota Kelantan (Al-Petrawi I))

This rank is limited to 40 living recipients at any time, except foreign citizens who are conferred honorary awards. The recipient of this award receives the title Dato' and his wife Datin.

This rank comprises collar, sash, breast star and badge.

=== Knight Commander ===
Knight Commander of the Order of the Services to the Crown of Kelantan (D.P.J.K.) (Malay: Darjah Dato' Paduka Jasa Mahkota Kelantan (Al-Petrawi II))

This rank is limited to 60 living recipients at any time, except foreign citizens who are conferred honorary awards. The recipient of this award receives the title Dato' and his wife Datin.

This rank comprises sash, breast star and badge.

=== Commander ===
Commander of the Order of the Services to the Crown of Kelantan (P.J.K.) (Malay: Paduka Jasa Mahkota Kelantan (Al-Petrawi III))

There is no limit to the number of persons to be awarded this honour and can also be conferred on foreign citizens as an honorary award. It does not carry any title.

This rank comprises neck ribbon and badge.

=== Officer ===
Officer of the Order of the Services to the Crown of Kelantan (B.J.K.) (Malay: Bentara Jasa Mahkota Kelantan (Al-Petrawi IV))

There is no limit to the number of persons to be awarded this honour and can also be conferred on foreign citizens as an honorary award. It does not carry any title.

This rank comprises only gold badge with medal ribbon.

=== Member ===
Member of the Order of the Services to the Crown of Kelantan (A.J.K.) (Malay: Ahli Jasa Mahkota Kelantan (Al-Petrawi V))

There is no limit to the number of persons to be awarded this honour and can also be conferred on foreign citizens as an honorary award. It does not carry any title.

This rank comprises only silver badge with medal ribbon.

== Recipients ==
=== Knights Grand Commander (SPJK) ===
- 2022: Zulkifli Omar
- 2024: Razarudin Husain
- 2024: Nordin Muhamad
- 2024: Muhamad Zaki Harun

=== Knights Commander (DPJK) ===
- 2016: Zulkifli Omar
- 2016: Ahmad Puzi Ab Kahar
- 2016: Jalaluddin Abdul Rahman
- 2016: Abdul Rahman Ismail
- 2016: Coursesenu Ibrahim
- 2016: Khairuldin Saad
- 2016: Zainuddin Yaacob
- 2017: Zulkifli Yahya
- 2017: Nordin Muhamad
- 2017: Hasanuddin Hassan
- 2017: Mohd Nasir Yusoff
- 2017: Che Yussof Che Ngah
- 2017: Din Ahmad
- 2017: Mohd Sakri Arifin
- 2017: Mokhtar Mohd Noor
- 2018: Roslee Chik
- 2018: Zulkefli Ibrahim
- 2018: Rusli Mohd Noor
- 2022: Mohd Zubil Mat Som
- 2022: Muhamad Zaki Harun
- 2023: Aidid Tajuddin
- 2024: Sheik Azhar Sheik Omar
- 2025: Azizee Ismail
- 2025: Mohd Ali Tamby
- 2025: Muhammad Kifli Ma Hasan
- 2026: Mohd Hairuddin Che Hamid

== See also ==
- Orders, decorations, and medals of the Malaysian states and federal territories#Kelantan
- Orders, decorations, and medals of Kelantan
- List of post-nominal letters (Kelantan)
