= Malay styles and titles =

Malay-language system of styles, titles and honorifics

The Malay language has a complex system of styles, titles and honorifics which are used extensively in Brunei Darussalam, Malaysia and Singapore.

Brunei, Malaysia, Singapore, few provinces in the Philippines and several provinces in Indonesia regularly award honorary and life titles. What follows in this article is specific to the Malaysian system. References to Brunei and Indonesia are given when pertinent.

In Malaysia, all non-hereditary titles can be granted to both men and women. Every title has a form of address which can be used by the wife of the title holder. This form is not used by the husband of a titled woman; such a woman will bear a title which is the same as a titled man.

== Former usage ==
Singapore, whose Malay royalty was abolished by the British colonial government in 1891, has adopted civic titles for its leaders. However, when the officials and leaders who were bestowed the Malay titles by Malaysia and Brunei, the title will be only referred to on their visit to the title's state's local media.

Much of the Philippines was historically accustomed to the usage of Malay titles by its royals and nobles, such as Raja Sulayman and Dayang Kalangitan in Luzon. Malay titles are still prominently used by the royal houses of Sulu and Maguindanao among other noble lineages in Mindanao in preservation of genealogies. Officially, the republic does not grant royal or noble titles according to the 1987 Constitution.

Indonesia, meanwhile, as a republic, does not recognise hereditary rulers and aristocratic systems outside of Yogyakarta. In the Riau–Lingga Sultanate, located in the archipelago of present-day Indonesia, the title Yang di-Pertuan Muda was held by Bugis viceroys who exercised political authority alongside the Malay sultans. The office reflected the importance of maritime trade and political networks connecting the islands of the Riau–Lingga region with other parts of Southeast Asia.

== Usage ==
The sequence that should be used when formally writing or addressing a person's name is: honorary style, professional rank, royal hereditary title, federal title, state title, non-royal hereditary title, Doctor (of medicine or philosophy), Haji/Hajah (for Muslim men and women who have performed the Hajj), name.

For instance, in Brunei, the Wazir is a group of royal nobles, namely one of the royal princes who is gahara (pure descendants of the Sultan), are the second-highest official post in the nation, right behind the Sultan. Following this, the Cheteria, only bestowed upon the Pengiran, who perform specific jobs and are ranked above the Manteri, a group of non-royal nobles. An example of a Manteri would be the former police commissioner of Brunei, Hasrin Sabtu, whose honorary title would be Yang Dimuliakan (The Exalted One), noble rank is Pehin Orang Kaya Pendikar Alam, state title is Dato Paduka Seri and traditional Bruneian prefix title for non-royalty is Awang (Mr.).

When in the home state, the state title may precede the federal title. An example is the current Premier of Sarawak, Abang Abdul Rahman Zohari Abang Openg, whose federal title is Tan Sri, whose state title is Datuk Patinggi and Bruniean title is Dato Seri Setia. His title will be expressed as either:

- Yang Amat Berhormat Tan Sri Datuk Patinggi (Dr.) Abang Haji Abdul Rahman Zohari bin Tun Datuk Abang Haji Openg (federally)
- Yang Amat Berhormat Datuk Patinggi Tan Sri (Dr.) Abang Haji Abdul Rahman Zohari bin Tun Datuk Abang Haji Openg (in his home state).
- Yang Amat Berhormat Tan Sri Dato Seri Setia (Dr.) Abang Haji Abdul Rahman Zohari bin Tun Datuk Abang Haji Openg (in Brunei).

Another exception is when a person has received an award from a state other than the person's home state; when visiting the award-bestowing state, that state's title will take the place of a home state's title (if any). As an example, the current Prime Minister, Anwar Ibrahim will be titled as follows:

- Yang Amat Berhormat Dato' Seri Anwar bin Ibrahim (federally)
- Yang Amat Berhormat Dato' Anwar bin Ibrahim (in Kelantan)
- Yang Amat Berhormat Dato' Seri Utama Anwar bin Ibrahim (in Penang)
- Yang Amat Berhormat Dato' Seri Diraja Anwar bin Ibrahim (in Perlis)
- Yang Amat Berhormat Datuk Seri Panglima Anwar bin Ibrahim (in Sabah)
- Yang Amat Berhormat Dato Laila Utama Anwar bin Ibrahim (in Brunei)

A style carried by virtue of royal title always trumps those carried by non-royal titles. Male royals may choose to append 'al-Haj' to their name instead of using 'Haji'. The following example is correct:

- Yang Amat Mulia General Tengku Dato' (name) al-Haj.

== Malay royalty ==
The following titles are hereditary and reserved for the royal families of Brunei and nine royal states of Malaysia.

=== Brunei ===
According to royal customs established during the reign of Sultan Hassanal Bolkiah, and based on knowledge passed down by elders, any name, rank, title, position, or honorific must be preceded by a terasul before being mentioned or written. This tradition reflects the deep respect for hierarchical and cultural values in Brunei. Given that Brunei is an absolute monarchy, the correct use of official titles for members of the royal family is essential. Incorrect usage can cause discomfort or be perceived as disrespectful, emphasising the importance of adhering to these formal protocols.

Terasul for the Sultan:

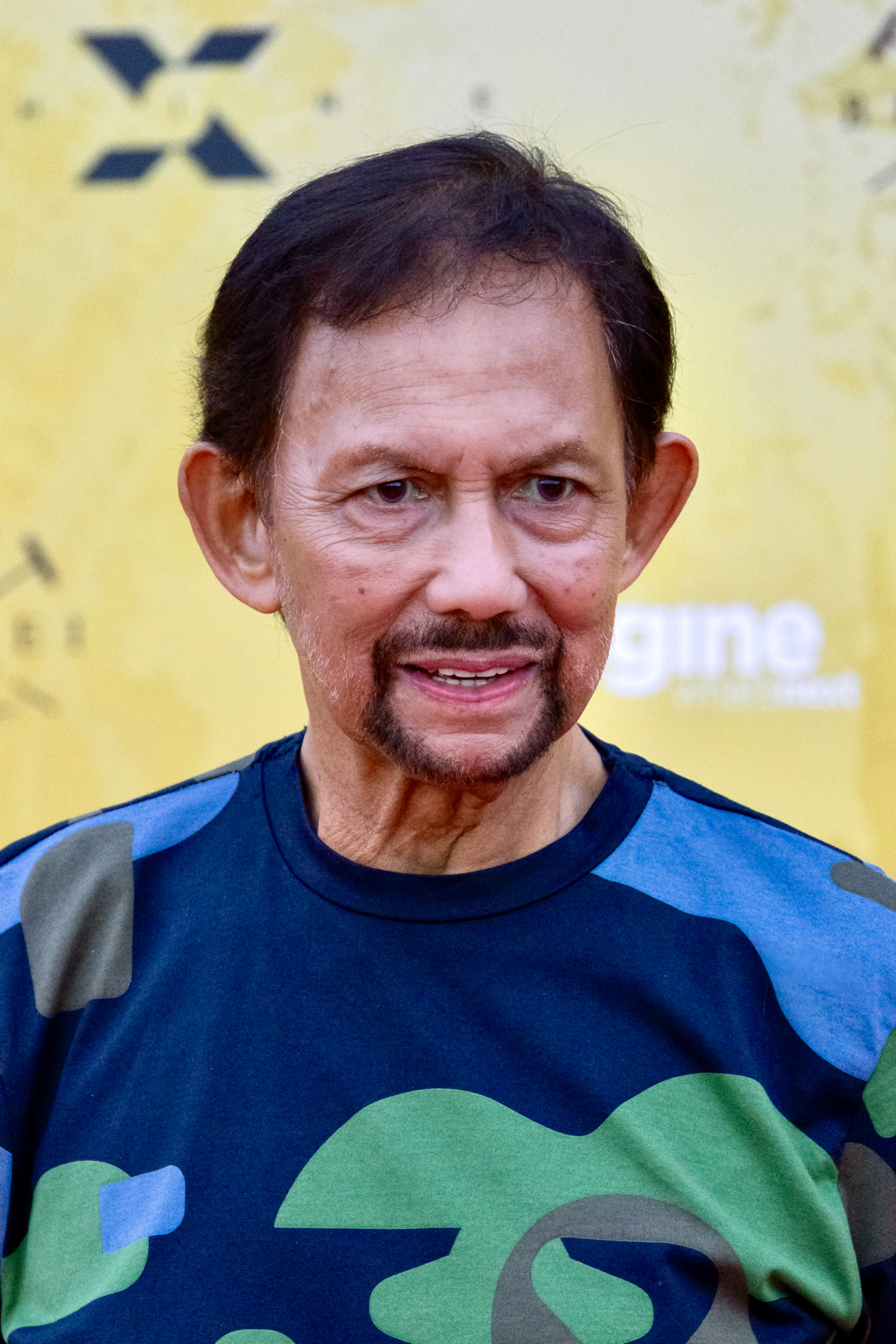
Kebawah Duli Yang Maha Mulia Paduka Seri Baginda Sultan Haji Hassanal Bolkiah, 29th Sultan of Brunei

- Before reaching puberty: Kebawah Duli Sultan (followed by the Sultan's given name).
- Before the coronation: Kebawah Duli Yang Maha Mulia Paduka Seri Sultan (followed by the Sultan's given name).
- After the coronation: Kebawah Duli Yang Maha Mulia Paduka Seri Baginda Sultan (followed by the Sultan's given name), Sultan and Yang Di-Pertuan.
- After the coronation and performing the Hajj: Kebawah Duli Yang Maha Mulia Paduka Seri Baginda Sultan Haji (Note: Sultan Omar Ali Saifuddien III, after performing the Hajj in September 1951, used the term Maulana as a substitute for Haji.) (followed by the Sultan's given name), Sultan and Yang Di-Pertuan.
- Upon abdication: Duli Yang Teramat Mulia Paduka Seri Begawan Sultan (followed by the Sultan's given name).
- Upon abdication after performing the Hajj: Duli Yang Teramat Mulia Paduka Seri Begawan Sultan Haji (Note: This terasul was used at the request of the late Sultan Omar Ali Saifuddien III himself upon his abdication from the throne.) (followed by the Sultan's given name).

Terasul for the Sultan's wife:

- Before being honoured: Kebawah Duli Yang Maha Mulia Paduka Seri Pengiran Isteri (followed by her given name).
- After being honoured: Kebawah Duli Yang Maha Mulia Paduka Seri Baginda Raja Isteri (followed by her given name).
- After being honoured and performing Hajj: Kebawah Duli Yang Maha Mulia Paduka Seri Baginda Raja Isteri Pengiran Anak Hajah (Note: For the Sultan's legitimate daughters, the word Puteri is added after the word Anak.) (followed by her given name).
- Second wife of the Sultan before his coronation: Kebawah Duli Yang Maha Mulia Paduka Seri Raja (Note: This terasul was used by Raja Buntar (the second wife of Sultan Muhammad Jamalul Alam I), daughter of Pengiran Tua Metussin bin Pengiran Anak Abdul Kahar bin Pengiran Temenggong Pengiran Abdul Rauf.) (followed by her name without the term 'Isteri').
- Second wife of the Sultan after his coronation: Duli Yang Maha Mulia Paduka Seri Pengiran Isteri (Note: According to royal custom, if the Sultan marries after his coronation, his wife is not given the title Raja Isteri because this title is reserved for the wife who was honoured during the coronation. However, she can be granted the title Raja Isteri if the Sultan undergoes another coronation to allow the Pengiran Isteri to be honoured. This custom was observed during the reign of Sultan Omar Ali Saifuddin I when Raja Isteri Nor Alam had passed away, and Sultan Omar Ali Saifuddin I intended to marry Raja Puteri. Raja Puteri requested the Sultan to undergo another coronation so she could be honoured as Raja Isteri.) (followed by her given name).
- Sultan's wife from common lineage: (Note: After being granted the title Pengiran Isteri or Pengiran Bini, her terasul depends on the title conferred by the Sultan.) Duli Yang Teramat Mulia Pengiran Isteri or Pengiran Bini (Note: The title Hajah is added if she has performed the obligatory Hajj.) (followed by her given name).
- After abdication from the throne: Duli Yang Teramat Mulia Paduka Suri Seri Begawan Raja (Note: This terasul was used at the request of the late Sultan Omar Ali Saifuddien III when he abdicated from the throne.) (followed by her given name).

Terasul for the Pengiran Muda Mahkota, 'Crown Prince' and his wife:

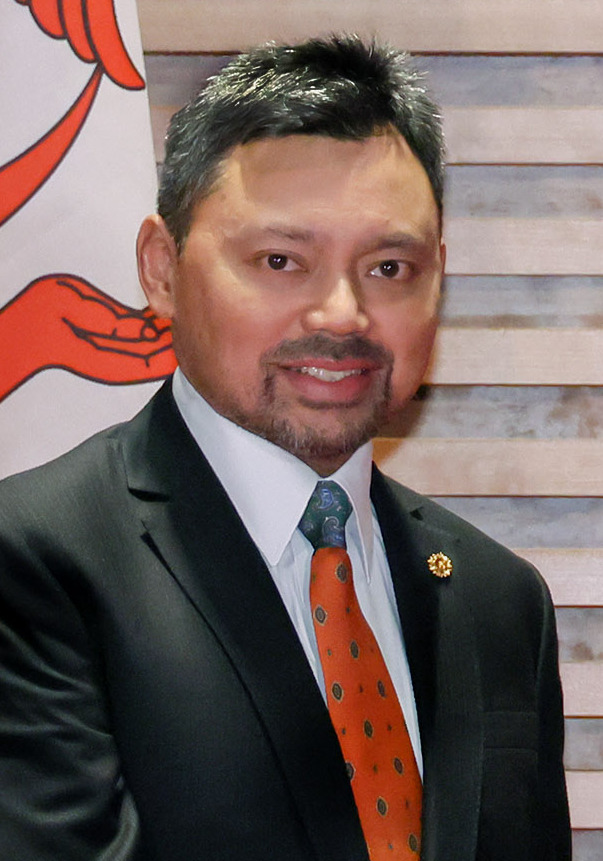
Duli Yang Teramat Mulia Paduka Seri Pengiran Muda Mahkota Pengiran Muda Haji Al-Muhtadee Billah, son of Sultan Hassanal Bolkiah

- Before performing the obligatory Hajj: Duli Yang Teramat Mulia Paduka Seri Pengiran Muda Mahkota (followed by his given name).
- After performing the obligatory Hajj: Duli Yang Teramat Mulia Paduka Seri Pengiran Muda Mahkota Pengiran Muda Haji (followed by his given name).
- Wife of the Pengiran Muda Mahkota: Duli Yang Teramat Mulia Paduka Seri Pengiran Anak Isteri (Note: The title Hajah is added if she has performed the obligatory Hajj.) (followed by her given name).
- Wife of the Pengiran Muda Mahkota from common lineage: After being officially declared and granted the title of either Pengiran Isteri, Pengiran Bini, or any other title, her terasul depends on the bestowed honour (followed by her given name).

Terasul for the gahara (Note: Gahara refers to the sons and daughters of the Sultan and their wives, the royal family and their wives, the children of Pengirans and their wives, where the wives are either from royal or Peranakan families, or from commoner backgrounds, who are granted the title "Pengiran" by the Sultan.) son of Sultan and his wife:

- Gahara son of Sultan: Yang Teramat Mulia Paduka Seri Duli Pengiran Muda (Note: The eldest is distinguished by the title Pengiran Muda Besar, while the others are referred to as Pengiran Muda Tengah, Pengiran Muda Iring, Pengiran Muda Damit, and the youngest is called Pengiran Muda Bongsu.) (followed by his given name).
- If he becomes a Wazir: Duli Yang Teramat Mulia Paduka Seri (followed by his title) Pengiran Muda (followed by his given name).
- Wife of the gahara son of Sultan: Yang Amat Mulia Pengiran Anak Isteri (followed by her given name).
- Wife of the gahara son of Sultan from common lineage: After being officially declared and granted the title of either Pengiran Isteri, Pengiran Bini, or any other title, her terasul depends on the bestowed honour (followed by her given name).

Terasul for the gahara daughter of Sultan:

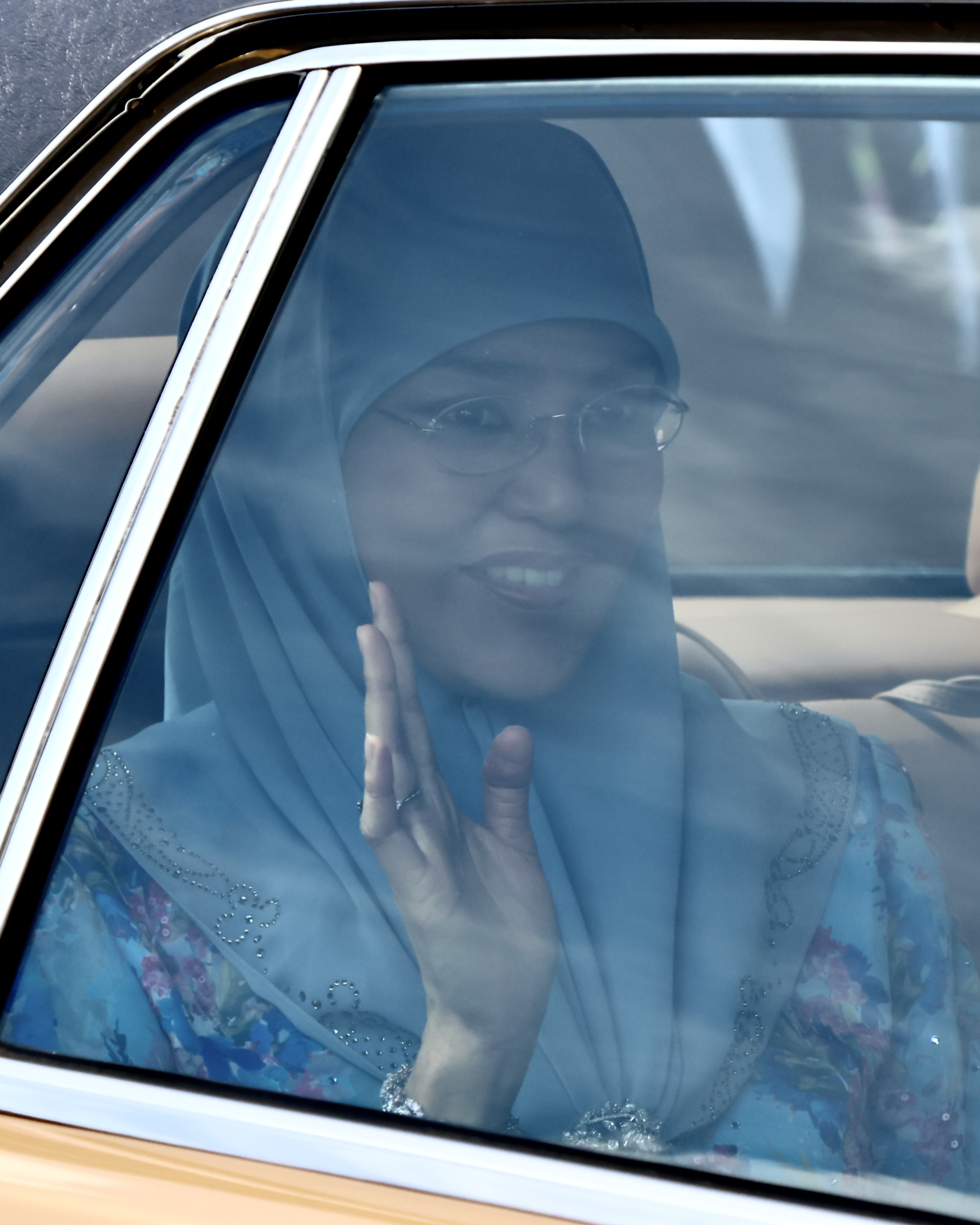
Yang Teramat Mulia Paduka Seri Pengiran Anak Puteri Hajah Majeedah Nuurul Bolkiah, daughter of Sultan Hassanal Bolkiah

- For the gahara daughter of Sultan: Yang Teramat Mulia Paduka Seri Pengiran Anak Puteri (followed by her given name).
- If married to a Wazir or Cheteria: Same as above, preceded by the phrase isteri kepada (followed by her husband's title).

Terasul for the children of gahara son of Sultan:

- For the male child of a gahara son: Yang Amat Mulia Pengiran Muda (followed by his given name).
- For the female child of a gahara son: Yang Amat Mulia Pengiran Anak (followed by her given name).

Terasul for the children of gahara daughter of Sultan:

- For the male child of a gahara daughter: Yang Amat Mulia Pengiran Anak (Note: For a gahara son who is the eldest to the Pengiran Muda Besar, he is known to be referred to as Pengiran Muda Besar Chuchu.) (followed by his given name).
- For the female child of a gahara daughter: Yang Amat Mulia Pengiran Anak (followed by her given name).

Terasul of the mother of Raja Isteri, 'Queen Consort':

- Yang Teramat Mulia Pengiran Babu Raja (followed by her given name).
- If the Queen Consort's mother is from a common lineage, or if she has been granted the title Pengiran or otherwise, the terasul to be used for her will depend on the title granted by the Sultan.

Terasul of the non-gahara children of Sultan:

- Yang Amat Mulia Pengiran Anak (followed by their given name).

Terasul of the non-gahara grandchildren of Sultan:

- Yang Mulia Pengiran Anak (followed by their given name).

Terasul of the Perdana Wazir and his wife:

- If he is the gahara son of the Sultan: Duli Yang Teramat Mulia Paduka Seri Pengiran Perdana Wazir Sahibul Himmah Wal-Waqar (Note: This terasul was first used on 13 March 1984. Sahibul Himmah Wal-Waqar means a Wazir who possesses determination, power, honour, and greatness. This title was introduced during the reign of Sultan Hassanal Bolkiah and was granted to Yang Teramat Mulia Paduka Seri Duli Pengiran Temenggong Sahibul Bahar Pengiran Muda Mohamed Bolkiah on 6 February 1970. This terasul was established based on the decision made by the Privy Council during its session on 7 July 1969.) (followed by his given name).
- If he is the non-gahara son of the Sultan: Yang Teramat Mulia Seri Paduka Pengiran Perdana Wazir Sahibul Himmah Wal-Waqar (followed by his given name).
- The Duli Pengiran Perdana Wazir's wife from Pengiran lineage: Yang Amat Mulia Pengiran Anak Isteri (Note: The terasul reading Yang Teramat Mulia Pengiran Anak Isteri Pengiran Anak Hajah Zariah is specifically for the individual as stated in the memorandum from the Office of the Secretary of State, reference number SUK/0/215/70/II, dated 2 August 1982.) (followed by her given name), wife of Duli Yang Teramat Mulia Paduka Seri Pengiran Perdana Wazir Sahibul Himmah Wal-Waqar.
- The Pengiran Perdana Wazir's wife from Pengiran lineage: Yang Amat Mulia Pengiran Isteri (followed by her given name).
- The Duli Pengiran Perdana Wazir or Pengiran Perdana Wazir's wife from common lineage: The terasul is decreed, subject to the Sultan's grant.

Terasul of the Wazir (Note: If the Wazir is a son of the Sultan who is gahara, the word Duli will be mentioned before Yang Teramat Mulia, and Seri Paduka will be replaced by Paduka Seri.) and his wife:

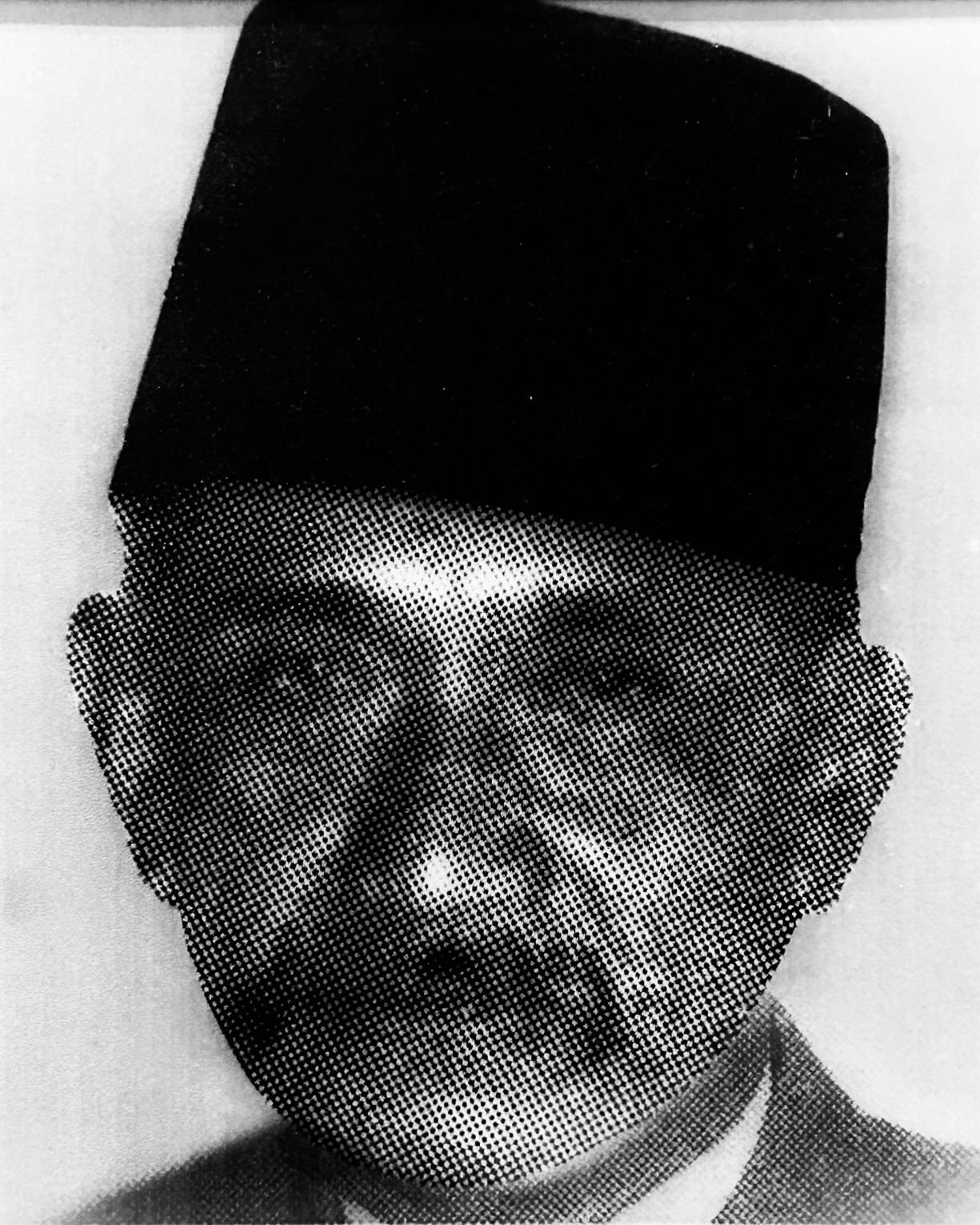
Yang Teramat Mulia Seri Paduka Pengiran Di-Gadong Sahibul Mal Pengiran Anak Khamis, non-gahara son of Sultan Hashim Jalilul Alam Aqamaddin

- Pengiran Bendahara: Yang Teramat Mulia Seri Paduka Pengiran Bendahara Seri Maharaja Permaisuaras (Note: This terasul means a Wazir who represents the Sultan and whose words are heard.) (followed by his given name).
- Pengiran Di-Gadong: Yang Teramat Mulia Seri Paduka Pengiran Di-Gadong Sahibul Mal (Note: This terasul means a Wazir who possesses the Sultan's treasury.) (followed by his given name).
- Pengiran Pemancha: Yang Teramat Mulia Seri Paduka Pengiran Pemancha Sahibul Rae' Wal-Mashuarah (Note: The terasul means a Wazir who possesses vision and the ability to counsel.) (followed by his given name).
- Pengiran Temenggong: Yang Teramat Mulia Seri Paduka Pengiran Temenggong Sahibul Bahar (Note: The terasul means a Wazir who commands the seas.) (followed by his given name).
- If the Wazir is a son of the Sultan and his wife is from Pengiran lineage: Yang Amat Mulia Pengiran Anak Isteri (followed by her given name).
- If all of Wazir's wives from Pengiran lineage: Yang Amat Mulia Pengiran Bini (followed by their given name).
- If the Wazir's wife from a common lineage: Yang Mulia (followed by her given name). Wife of Yang Teramat Mulia Seri Paduka Pengiran Bendahara, (Note: The wife of Yang Teramat Mulia Seri Paduka Pengiran Bendahara from common lineage was once granted the title Pengiran by Sultan Hashim Jalilul Alam Aqamaddin. Dayang Badariah binti Pehin Datu Perdana Manteri Haji Awang Abdul Rahman bin Radin Haji Othman Betawi became Pengiran Siti Aishah due to her marriage to Pengiran Anak Abdul Rahman bin Pengiran Muda Besar Omar 'Ali Saifuddien ibnu Sultan Hashim Jalilul Alam Aqamaddin. Sultan Muhammad Jamalul Alam II also granted the title to Dayang Fatimah binti Haji Awang Hasan bin Pehin Siraja Khatib Haji Awang Muhammad Daud bin Radin Haji Othman Betawi, who became Pengiran Fatimah.) Pengiran Di-Gadong, Pengiran Pemancha or Pengiran Temenggong (followed by their given name), unless there is a special decree.

Terasul of the Cheteria and his wife:

- Cheteria: Yang Amat Mulia Pengiran (followed by his title and given name).
- Wife of Cheteria if she is from Pengiran Peranakan Bertaras: Yang Amat Mulia Pengiran (followed by her given name).
- Wife of Cheteria if she is from Pengiran or common lineages: Yang Mulia (followed by her given name), wife of Pengiran (followed by the husband's title).

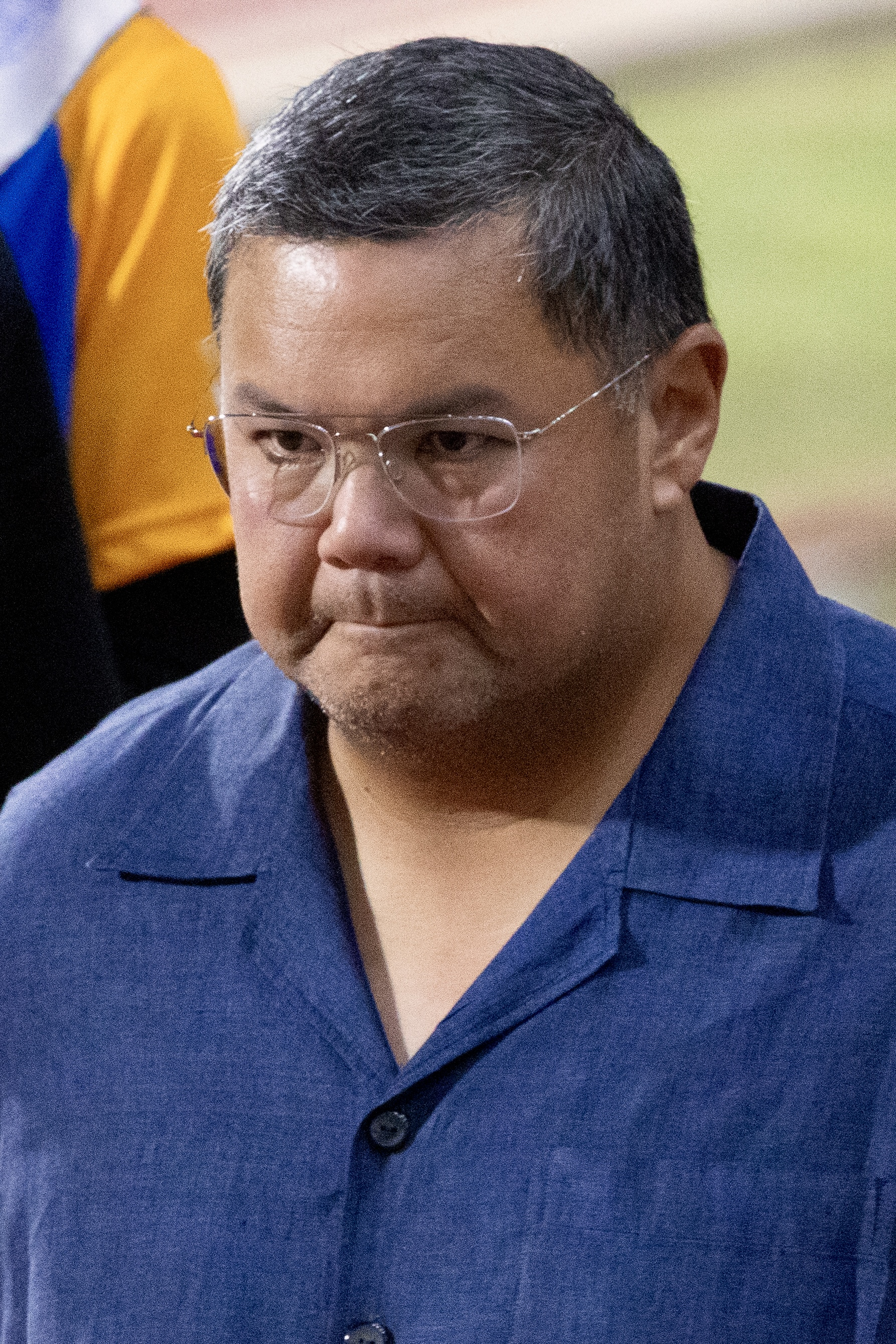
Yang Amat Mulia Pengiran Muda Abdul Hakeem, son of Duli Yang Teramat Mulia Seri Paduka Pengiran Di-Gadong Sahibul Mal Pengiran Muda Haji Jefri Bolkiah

Terasul of the gahara male and female child of Wazir:

- For the male child of Duli Pengiran Perdana Wazir or Wazir (gahara son of Sultan): Yang Amat Mulia Pengiran Muda (Note: The title Pengiran Muda was also granted to Pengiran Peranakan Bertaras with the approval of the Sultan, such as when Sultan Ahmad Tajuddin granted it to Yang Amat Mulia Pengiran Anak Hashim ibni Pengiran Bendahara Pengiran Anak Abdul Rahman, who became Pengiran Muda Hashim, during his marriage to Yang Teramat Mulia Paduka Seri Pengiran Anak Puteri Besar binti Sultan Muhammad Jamalul Alam II. Similarly, the title was granted to Yang Amat Mulia Pengiran Muda Abdul Kahar during his marriage to Yang Amat Mulia Pengiran Anak Saerah binti Sultan Ahmad Tajuddin.) (followed by his given name).
- If female: Yang Amat Mulia Pengiran Anak (followed by her given name).
- For the gahara male child of Pengiran Perdana Wazir (but the Perdana Wazir is a non-gahara son of the Sultan): Yang Amat Mulia Pengiran Anak (Note: The title Yang Amat Mulia Pengiran Anak was also granted by Sultan Hassanal Bolkiah to Yang Mulia Pengiran Haji Abdul Aziz bin Pengiran Jaya Negara Pengiran Haji Abu Bakar, who became Yang Amat Mulia Pengiran Anak Haji Abdul Aziz during his marriage to Yang Teramat Mulia Paduka Seri Pengiran Anak Puteri Masna binti Duli Yang Teramat Mulia Paduka Seri Begawan Sultan Haji Omar Ali Saifuddien Sa'adul Khairi Waddien.) (followed by his given name).
- For the gahara male child of Wazir (but the Wazir is a non-gahara son of the Sultan): Yang Mulia Pengiran Anak (followed by his given name).
- For the non-gahara child of Wazir: Yang Mulia Pengiran (followed by their given name).

Terasul of the children of Cheteria:

- For the gahara children of Cheteria (if the wife of the Cheteria is a gahara daughter of the Sultan): Yang Amat Mulia Pengiran Anak (followed by their given name).
- For the gahara and non-gahara child of Cheteria: Yang Mulia Pengiran (followed by their given name).

Terasul of the gahara of Pengiran Anak:

- For the children of Pengiran Anak whose wife is a Pengiran Anak: Yang Mulia Pengiran Anak (followed by their given name).
- For the children of Pengiran Anak whose wife is not a Pengiran Anak: Yang Mulia Pengiran (followed by their given name).

Terasul of the Pengiran Kebanyakan:

- For a male or female, whether gahara or not: Yang Mulia Pengiran (followed by the name of the individual).

Terasul of the Pehin Manteri:

- For the Pehin Datu Seri Maharaja: Yang Dimuliakan Lagi Dihormati.
- For the Pehin Datu Perdana Manteri: Yang Dimuliakan Lagi Dihormati.
- For the Pehin Orang Kaya Di-Gadong and Pehin Orang Kaya Di-Gadong Seri Lela: Yang Dimuliakan Lagi Dihormati.
- For the Pehin Manteri Berchiri: Yang Dimuliakan.
- For the Manteri Bertauliah: Yang Mulia.

Terasul of the senior government officials:

- For the cabinet ministers: Yang Berhormat.
- For the members of the Council of Ministers: According to the respective title and position. (Note: Subject to royal decree. Prior to independence in 1984, members of the Privy Council and members of the Legislative Council were granted the title Yang Berhormat.)
- For the high commissioners or ambassadors: Tuan Yang Terutama.

=== Malaysia ===
- Kebawah Duli Yang Maha Mulia (KDYMM) (literally 'He/She who is below the dust of The Almighty') is used for the Yang di-Pertuan Agong, and state rulers alike. The title is a reference to the rulers being subjected to the Law of God with their powers below that of Allah. However, the Yang di-Pertuan Agong also uses the prefix 'Seri Paduka Baginda' (literally, 'He, the Footwear of the Prophet') and in English, his title is often translated as 'His Majesty'. The title is a reference to the rulers being in comparison to the prophet Muhammad, where the word paduka is translated in Malay as a type of footwear. In this styling, the Supreme Ruler is only the level of footwear in comparison to the Prophet. However, the style differs from state to state as according to states' tradition.

==== Federal ====
Titles of Malaysian royalty and rulers:

- Yang di-Pertuan Agong (literally, 'He who is made Supreme Lord' but usually 'Supreme Head' or 'Paramount Ruler') is the official title of the ruler of all Malaysia, elected from among the nine heads of the royal families. The title is often glossed 'King' in English. He is styled as Kebawah Duli Yang Maha Mulia Seri Paduka Baginda (His Majesty).
- Timbalan Yang di-Pertuan Agong (literally, 'Deputy of He who is made Supreme Lord', but usually 'Deputy Supreme Head' or 'Deputy Paramount Ruler') is the official title of the deputy ruler of all Malaysia who is also elected from among the nine heads of the royal families. The title is often glossed 'Deputy King' in English. He is styled as Kebawah Duli Yang Maha Mulia (His Royal Highness).
- Raja Permaisuri Agong (literally, 'The Supreme Lady') is the official title of the consort of the ruler of Malaysia. The title is often glossed 'Queen' in English. She is styled as Kebawah Duli Yang Maha Mulia Seri Paduka Baginda (Her Majesty).
- Yang di-Pertua Negeri (YDPN) is not a royal title, but the title of 'The Head of the State' (the 'Supreme Head') for the state of Penang, Melaka, Sabah, and Sarawak, which do not have hereditary rulers. Yang di-Pertua Negeri is installed by the Yang di-Pertuan Agong. The title is sometimes translated as 'Governor' in English. They are styled Tuan/Puan Yang Terutama (His/Her Excellency).

==== Negeri Sembilan ====
- Yamtuan Besar, officially Yang di-Pertuan Besar (literally 'He who is made Chief Ruler',) is the title of the ruler of Negeri Sembilan. He is styled as Duli Yang Maha Mulia (His Royal Highness).
- Tunku Ampuan Besar ('The Chief Royal Consort') is the title of the queen consort of royal parentage for Negeri Sembilan. She is styled as Duli Yang Maha Mulia (Her Royal Highness).
- Che' Ampuan Besar is the title of the queen consort of non-royal blood (commoner). She is styled as Duli Yang Teramat Mulia (Her Royal Highness).
- Tunku Ampuan ('The Chief Dowager') is the title of the queen dowager. She is styled as Yang Maha Mulia (Her Royal Highness).
- Tunku Puan Besar ('The Senior Chief Dowager') is the title of the senior queen dowager. She is styled Yang Maha Mulia (Her Royal Highness).
- The children of rulers have the title and style of Yang Amat Mulia (His/Her Highness) Tunku.
- The fiefs of the state, the Undangs are for the areas (luak) of Jelebu, Johol, Sungai Ujong, and Rembau. They are all styled Yang Teramat Mulia (His Grace). Their spouses are titled Tok Puan with the style Yang Mulia (Her Grace).
- The Tunku Besar of Tampin, a semi-autonomous area ruled by the Al-Qadri family. He is styled Yang Teramat Mulia (His Grace). His spouse is accorded the title of Tunku Isteri (of royal parentage) and Cik Puan Isteri (of non-royal blood) with the style of Yang Mulia (Her Grace).
- The Tunku Besar (literally the 'Senior Prince') of Seri Menanti is the title of eldest son of the Yang di-Pertuan Besar. He is styled Yang Amat Mulia (His Highness).

==== Selangor ====
- Sultan and Yang di-Pertuan is the title of the ruler of Selangor. He is styled Duli Yang Maha Mulia (His Royal Highness). The style is also the title of the state anthem.
- Tengku Ampuan Selangor is the title of the queen consort of royal parentage. She is styled as Duli Yang Maha Mulia (Her Royal Highness).
- Tengku Permaisuri Selangor is the title for queen consort of non-royal blood. She is styled as Duli Yang Maha Mulia (Her Royal Highness).
- Che' Puan Besar Selangor is the title for second consort of the ruler (of non-royal blood) if he is still marries with queen consort. She is styled as Yang Teramat Mulia (Her Highness).
- Tengku Ampuan (literally 'Queen Dowager') is the title of the queen dowager is she of royal blood. She is styled as Yang Maha Mulia (Her Royal Highness).
- Paduka Bonda Raja (literally 'Royal Mother') is the title of the Sultan's mother who was not installed as a Tengku Ampuan. She is styled as Yang Maha Mulia (Her Royal Highness).
- Permaisuri is the title of the queen dowager if she is not of royal blood. She is styled Yang Amat Mulia (Her Highness).
- Raja Muda Selangor (literally means 'Younger King') is the title of the heir apparent. He is then styled Duli Yang Teramat Mulia (His Highness).
- Raja Puan Muda Selangor (literally 'Younger Lady King') is the title of the consort of the heir apparent if she is of royal blood. She is styled Duli Yang Teramat Mulia (Her Highness).
- Che' Puan Muda Selangor is the title of the consort of the heir apparent if she is not of royal blood. She is styled Yang Teramat Mulia (Her Highness).
- The other children of the Sultan is titled and styled Yang Amat Mulia (His/Her Highness) Tengku.
- The palace dignitaries or Orang Besar Istana whom are responsible for any engagement involving the palace is titled and styled as Yang Dimuliakan (His Highness) Tengku. His spouse is accorded the honorific prefix of To’ Puan.

==== Perlis ====
- Raja and Yang di-Pertuan is the title of the ruler of Perlis. He is styled as Duli Yang Maha Mulia (His Royal Highness).
- Raja Perempuan (literally 'Female Queen') is the title of the queen consort of Perlis. She is styled Duli Yang Maha Mulia (Her Royal Highness).
- Raja Perempuan Besar is the title of the queen dowager. She is styled Yang Maha Mulia (Her Royal Highness).
- Raja Muda (literally 'Younger King') is the title of the heir apparent. He is styled Duli Yang Teramat Mulia (His Royal Highness).
- Raja Puan Muda (literally 'Younger Lady King') is the title of the consort of the heir apparent. She is styled Duli Yang Teramat Mulia (Her Royal Highness).
- The other children of the Raja and Raja Muda are styled as Yang Amat Mulia (His/Her Highness) Syed/Sharifah, with the suffix house name of Jamalullail.

==== Terengganu ====
- Sultan and Yang di-Pertuan is the title of the ruler of the state of Terengganu. He is styled Kebawah Duli Yang Maha Mulia (His Royal Highness).
- Tengku Ampuan Besar is the title of the queen consort of the state for queens of royal blood. She is styled as Kebawah Duli Yang Maha Mulia (Her Royal Highness).
- Permaisuri is the title of the queen consort if she is not of royal blood initially used by Sultanah Nur Zahirah until it was changed by Sultan Mizan. A Permaisuri is styled Kebawah Duli Yang Maha Mulia (Her Royal Highness).
- Sultanah is a customarily title that is awarded to the consort of the Sultan. She is styled Kebawah Duli Yang Maha Mulia (Her Royal Highness).
- Tengku Ampuan is the title of the Queen dowager. She is styled as Yang Maha Mulia (Her Royal Highness).
- Tengku Ampuan Tua (literally 'Grand Queen dowager') is the title of the senior queen dowager. She is styled as Yang Maha Mulia (Her Royal Highness).
- Tengku Besar is the title of the Sultan's mother if she has not been crowned. She is styled as Yang Teramat Mulia (Her Highness).
- Yang di-Pertuan Muda (literally 'He who is made the young Lord') is the title of the heir apparent. He is styled Duli Yang Teramat Mulia (His Royal Highness).
- Tengku Puan Muda is the title of the consort of the heir apparent if she is of royal blood. She is styled Duli Yang Teramat Mulia (Her Royal Highness).
- To' Puan Seri is the honorific form of address for the consort of the heir apparent if she is not of royal blood. She is styled Yang Amat Berbahagia (The Most Honourable).
- The other children of the Sultan is styled and titled Yang Amat Mulia (His/Her Highness) Tengku.

==== Kedah ====
- Sultan and Yang di-Pertuan is the title of the ruler of the state of Kedah. He is styled Kebawah Duli Yang Maha Mulia (His Royal Highness).
- Sultanah is the title of the ruler's consort, of royal blood or not. She is styled Kebawah Duli Yang Maha Mulia (Her Royal Highness).
- Tunku Ampuan (Dowager Queen) was the title of the widow of the ruler who is of royal blood. She was styled Yang Maha Mulia (Her Royal Highness).
- Che Puan Besar (literally 'Grand Dowager') is the title of the widow if she is not of royal blood. She is styled Yang Maha Mulia (Her Royal Highness).
- Raja Muda (literally 'Crown Prince') is the title of the heir apparent. He is styled Duli Yang Teramat Mulia (His Royal Highness).
- Raja Puan Muda (literally 'Crown Princess') is the title of the consort of the heir apparent. She is styled Duli Yang Teramat Mulia (Her Royal Highness).
- Tunku Mahkota (literally 'Deputy Crown Prince') is the title of the second heir apparent. He is titled Duli Yang Amat Mulia (His Highness).
- Tunku Puan Mahkota (literally 'Deputy Crown Princess') is the title of the consort of the second heir apparent. She is titled Duli Yang Amat Mulia (Her Highness).
- The other children of the Sultan and Raja Muda are titled and styled Yang Teramat Mulia (His/Her Highness) Tunku.

==== Kelantan ====
- Al-Sultan and Yang di-Pertuan Kelantan is the title of the ruler of the state of Kelantan. He is styled Kebawah Duli Yang Maha Mulia (His Royal Highness).
- Raja Perempuan Kelantan (literally 'Queen Consort') is the title of the consort of the Sultan if she is of royal blood. She is styled Duli Yang Maha Mulia (Her Royal Highness).
- Sultanah Kelantan is the title of the consort of the Sultan if she is not of royal blood. She is styled Duli Yang Maha Mulia (Her Royal Highness).
- Raja Perempuan (literally 'Queen Dowager') is the title of the queen dowager if she is of royal blood. She is styled Yang Maha Mulia (Her Royal Highness).
- Tengku Mahkota Kelantan (literally 'Crown Prince') is the title of the heir apparent. He is styled Yang Teramat Mulia (His Highness).
- Tengku Ampuan Mahkota Kelantan (literally 'Crown Princess') is the title of the consort of the heir apparent if she is of royal blood. She is styled Yang Teramat Mulia (Her Highness).
- Che Puan Mahkota Kelantan (equivalent to 'Crown Princess') is the title of the consort of the heir apparent if she is not of royal blood. She is styled Yang Teramat Mulia (Her Highness).
- The other children of the Al-Sultan are titled Yang Amat Mulia (His/Her Highness) Tengku. If they hold certain palace positions, they are titled Yang Berhormat Mulia (His/Her Highness The Honourable) Tengku.

==== Pahang ====
- Sultan and Yang di-Pertuan is the title of the ruler of the state of Pahang. He is styled Kebawah Duli Paduka Baginda (His Royal Highness).
- Tengku Ampuan Pahang (literally 'Queen Consort') is the title of the consort of the Sultan if she is of royal blood. She is styled Kebawah Duli Paduka Baginda (Her Royal Highness).
- Sultanah Pahang is the title of the consort of the Sultan if she is not of royal blood. She is styled Duli Yang Maha Mulia (Her Royal Highness).
- Tengku Ampuan Besar ((literally 'Queen Dowager') is the title of the queen dowager if she is of royal blood. She is styled as Yang Maha Mulia (Her Royal Highness).
- Che Puan Besar (literally 'Grand Dowager') is the title of the widow if she is not of royal blood. She is styled Yang Amat Mulia (Her Highness).
- Tengku Mahkota Pahang (literally 'Crown Prince') is the title of the heir apparent. He is styled Kebawah Duli Paduka Mulia (His Royal Highness).
- Tengku Puan Pahang (literally 'Crown Princess') is the title of the consort of the heir apparent if she is of royal blood. She is styled Kebawah Duli Paduka Mulia (Her Royal Highness).
- Che Puan Pahang (equivalent to 'Princess Consort') is the title of the consort of the heir apparent if she is not of royal blood. She is styled Kebawah Duli Paduka Mulia (Her Royal Highness).
- The children of the Sultan are titled and styled Yang Amat Mulia (His/Her Highness) Tengku. The children of the Tengku Mahkota are titled and styled Yang Mulia (His/Her Highness).
- The other all descendants of the Sultan are titled Tengku.

==== Johor ====
- Sultan and Yang di-Pertuan is the title of the ruler of Johor. He is styled Duli Yang Maha Mulia (His Majesty).
- Permaisuri is the customarily title for a queen consort of royal blood (direct daughter of the sultan) outside the Johor Sultanate's blood line. She is styled Duli Yang Maha Mulia (Her Majesty).
- Sultanah is the title for his wife with non-royal blood or for his wife of noble birth (distant royal relatives). She is styled Duli Yang Maha Mulia (Her Majesty).
- Tunku Ampuan (archaic) is the title for the consort of the Sultan if she is from a junior branch of the Johor Royal Family. She was styled Duli Yang Maha Mulia (Her Royal Highness). This was last used in 1895 for Tunku Ampuan Ungku Maimunah.
- Tunku Puan is the title of the queen dowager of royal blood. She is styled Yang Amat Mulia (Her Highness).
- Enche' Besar is the title awarded to the mother of the Sultan if she is not of royal blood. She is styled Yang Amat Mulia (Her Highness).
- Tunku Mahkota (literally 'Crown Prince') is the title of the heir apparent. He is styled Duli Yang Amat Mulia (His Royal Highness).
- Isteri Tunku Mahkota (literally 'Consort of the Crown Prince') is the title for the consort of the heir apparent. She is styled Yang Amat Mulia (Her Highness).
- Che' Puan Mahkota (formerly Che’ Puan Besar) is the customarily honorific form of address for the consort of the heir apparent if she is not of royal blood. She is styled as Yang Amat Mulia (Her Highness).
- Raja Muda (literally 'Younger King') is the title of the first son of the heir apparent. The situation is similar to France where during the reign of Louis XIV, his son was titled the le Grand Dauphin and his grandson was also titled le Petit Dauphin. He is titled Duli Yang Amat Mulia (His Royal Highness).
- The other children of the Sultan are titled and styled Yang Amat Mulia (His/Her Highness) Tunku.
- Related Royal paternal hereditary titles to Tunku, is Ungku. Denotes particular lineages of the Royal Family of Johor with the style of Yang Mulia (His/ Her Highness).

==== Perak ====
- Sultan, Yang di-Pertuan dan Raja Pemerintah is the title of the ruler of Perak. He is styled Duli Yang Maha Mulia Paduka Seri (His Royal Highness).
- Raja Perempuan Perak is the title of the consort of the ruler if she is of royal blood. She is styled Duli Yang Maha Mulia (Her Royal Highness).
- Raja Permaisuri Perak is the title of the consort of the ruler if she is not of royal blood. She is styled Duli Yang Maha Mulia (Her Royal Highness).
- Che Puan Negara is the title of the second wife of the ruler. She is styled Yang Teramat Mulia (Her Highness).
- Raja Perempuan is the title of the queen dowager if she is of royal blood. Would be granted the style of Yang Maha Mulia (Her Royal Highness).
- Raja Permaisuri is the title of the queen dowager is she is not of royal blood. She is styled Yang Maha Mulia (Her Royal Highness).
- Raja Muda Perak is the title of the heir apparent. He is styled Duli Yang Teramat Mulia (His Royal Highness).
- Raja Puan Besar Perak is the title of the consort of the heir apparent if she is of royal blood. She is styled Duli Yang Teramat Mulia (Her Royal Highness).
- Che Puan Besar Perak is the title of the consort of the heir apparent if she is not of royal blood. She is styled Duli Yang Teramat Mulia (Her Royal Highness).
- Raja Di-Hilir Perak is the title of second heir apparent. He is styled Duli Yang Amat Mulia (His Highness).
- Raja Puan Muda Perak is the title of the consort of the second heir apparent if she is of royal blood. She is styled Duli Yang Amat Mulia (Her Highness).
- Che Puan Muda Perak is the title of the consort of the second heir apparent if she is not of royal blood. She is styled Duli Yang Amat Mulia (Her Highness).
- The other children of the Sultan and Raja Bergelar is styled Yang Teramat Mulia (His/Her Highness) Raja/Engku.

== Federal titles ==
In Malaysia, the Yang di-Pertuan Agong (King of Malaysia) grants honours to recipients nominated by the Government of Malaysia as awards which are honorary and non-hereditary. These honours may also be revoked by the Yang di-Pertuan Agong or returned by the individual. Some of the highest honours bestowed carries with them the titles of Tun, Tan Sri, or Datuk.

There is a maximum number of Malaysian subjects who may be award-holders at any one time. These numerical limits apply only to Malaysian subjects. Foreigners may be awarded such titles in a supernumerary and honorary capacity, and may use the title locally.

=== Tun ===
The Tun title has existed in Malay traditional society for hundreds of years. In ancient times, Tun was an honorific title used by noble people of royal lineage, inherited by the male descendants. Over time, the Tun title has become a title conferred by the Yang di-Pertuan Agong to the most-deserving recipient who has highly contributed to the nation.

Tun is the most senior federal title awarded to recipients of either the Seri Maharaja Mangku Negara (Grand Commander of the Order of the Defender of the Realm) (SMN) or Seri Setia Mahkota (Grand Commander of the Order of Loyalty to the Crown of Malaysia) (SSM). However, the SMN and SSM are not the highest federal awards, ranking fourth and fifth, respectively. There may not be more than 25 (SMN) and 35 (SSM) living holders of each of these awards respectively at any one time. The title for the wife of a Tun is called Toh Puan. The recipients and their wives are then bestowed with the style of Yang Amat Berbahagia or (The Most Honourable).

The SMN is usually awarded to newly appointed Yang di-Pertua Negeri (YDPN), and to all the retired Prime Ministers of Malaysia, with the exception of Tunku Abdul Rahman (he is the Prince of the state of Kedah), Najib Razak, Muhyiddin Yassin, and Ismail Sabri Yaakob.

Examples:

- Yang Amat Berbahagia (The Most Honourable) Tun Dr. Mahathir Mohamad SMN;
- Yang Amat Berbahagia (The Most Honourable) Tun Dr. Ling Liong Sik SSM.
- Yang Amat Berbahagia (The Most Honourable) Tun Ismail Mohamed Ali SSM.
- Yang Amat Berbahagia (The Most Honourable) Tun Dr. Siti Hasmah SSM.

=== Tan Sri ===
Tan Sri is the second-most senior federal title and a honorific, used to denote recipients of the Panglima Mangku Negara (Commander of the Order of the Defender of the Realm) (PMN) and the Panglima Setia Mahkota (Commander of the Order of Loyalty to the Crown of Malaysia) (PSM). The wife of a Tan Sri is called Puan Sri. The recipients and their wives are then bestowed with the style of Yang Berbahagia or (The Honourable).

Examples:

- Tan Sri Datuk Amar P. Ramlee
- Yang Berhormat Tan Sri Dato' Haji Muhyiddin Yassin PSM;
- Yang Berbahagia Tan Sri Datuk Seri Panglima Abdul Gani Patail PMN;
- Yang Berbahagia Tan Sri Dr Runme Shaw, K.St.J;
- Yang Berbahagia Tan Sri Dato' Seri Michelle Yeoh PSM;
- Yang Berbahagia Tan Sri Dato' Sri Dr Mohamed Shafee Abdullah PSM.

=== Datuk ===
Datuk is a federal title that has been conferred since 1965. It is limited to recipients of Panglima Jasa Negara (Commander of the Order of Meritorious Service) (PJN) and Panglima Setia Diraja (Commander of the Order of Loyalty to the Royal Family of Malaysia) (PSD). There may be up to 200 living PJN holders and 200 living PSD holders at any one time. The title of the wife of a male Datuk is Datin; women with the title can take either the title Datin or Datuk. The recipients and their wives are then bestowed with the style of Yang Berbahagia (The Honourable).

Examples:

- Yang Berbahagia Datuk Lee Chong Wei PJN;
- Yang Berbahagia Datuk Punch Gunalan PSD;
- Yang Berbahagia Datuk Ali Abdul Kadir;
- Yang Berbahagia Datuk Ahmad Fauzi Hasan;
- Yang Berbahagia Datuk Prof. Dr. Mohamad Akram Laldin.

=== Dato ===
In Brunei, the title Dato is now comparable to the Commonwealth's Sir and is frequently used with a great non-royal chief.

== State titles ==
In Malaysia, state honours are awarded by the respective heads of the thirteen states. Such titles are honorary and non-hereditary. State titles may be revoked or suspended by the head of state, or may be returned by the individual. Dato' Sri or Dato' Seri (sometimes Dato’ is spelled and pronounced Datuk in some states) is the highest state title conferred by the Ruler on the most deserving recipients who have contributed greatly to the nation or state. It ranks below the federal title Tun, and is an honour equivalent to federal title Tan Sri. The wife of a recipient is Datin Sri or Datin Seri. In many cases, the number of Malaysian nationals who may hold a state title or honour at one time is limited. Such limits do not apply to foreigners.

Title	Variant(s)	Awarding state(s)	Associated honours
Dato Sri	Pehin Sri	Sarawak	Knight Grand Commander of Most Exalted Order of the Star of Sarawak (SBS)
Dato Sri	Dato Sri	Sarawak	Knight Commander of the Most Exalted Order of the Star of Sarawak (PNBS)
Dato' Seri	Dato' Seri Utama	Kedah	Member of the Supreme Order of Sri Mahawangsa (DMK)
Dato' Seri	Dato' Seri Utama	Kedah	(SMDK)
Dato' Seri	Dato’ Seri Diraja	Kedah	Grand Commander of the Order of Loyalty to Sultan Abdul Halim Mu'adzam Shah (SHMS)
Dato' Seri	Dato’ Seri Wira	Kedah	Knight Grand Commander of the Glorious Order of the Crown of Kedah (SGMK)
Dato' Seri	Dato’ Seri	Kedah	Knight Grand Commander of the Exalted Order of the Crown of Kedah (SPMK)
Dato' Seri	Dato’ Seri	Kedah	Knight Grand Companion of the Order of Loyalty to the Royal House of Kedah (SSDK)
Dato' Seri	Dato’ Seri Utama	Negeri Sembilan	Principal Grand Knight of the Order of Loyalty to Negeri Sembilan (SUNS)
Dato' Seri	Dato’ Seri	Negeri Sembilan	Knight Grand Commander of the Grand Order of Tuanku Jaafar (SPTJ)
Dato' Seri	Dato’ Seri	Negeri Sembilan	Grand Knight of the Order of Loyalty to Tuanku Muhriz (SSTM)
Dato' Seri	Dato’ Seri	Negeri Sembilan	Grand Knight of the Order of Loyalty to Negeri Sembilan (SSNS)
Dato' Seri	Dato' Seri Utama	Penang	Knight Grand Commander of the Order of the Defender of State (DUPN)
Dato' Seri	Dato' Seri	Penang	Knight Commander of the Order of the Defender of State (DPPN)
Dato' Seri	Dato' Seri	Penang	Commander of the Order of the Defender of State (DGPN)
Dato' Seri	Dato’ Seri Diraja	Perak	Perak Family Order of Sultan Azlan Shah (Ordinary Class) (SPSA)
Dato' Seri	Dato’ Seri Diraja	Perak	Perak Family Order of Sultan Nazrin Shah (Ordinary Class) (SPSN)
Dato' Seri	Dato’ Seri	Perak	Grand Knight of the Azlanii Royal Family Order (DSA)
Dato' Seri	Dato’ Seri	Perak	Grand Knight of the Order of Cura Si Manja Kini (SPCM)
Dato' Seri	Dato’ Seri Panglima	Perak	Grand Knight of the Order of Taming Sari (SPTS)
Dato' Seri	Dato’ Seri	Perak	Knight Grand Commander of the Order of the Perak State Crown (SPMP)
Dato' Seri	Dato’ Seri DiRaja Bendahara Negara	Perlis	Member of the Order of Dato’ Bendahara Sri Jamalullail (DBSJ)
Dato' Seri	Dato’ Seri Diraja	Perlis	Knight Grand Companion of the Order of the Gallant Prince Syed Putra Jamalullail (SSPJ)
Dato' Seri	Dato’ Seri Diraja	Perlis	Knight Grand Companion of the Order of the Gallant Prince Syed Sirajuddin Jamalullail (SSSJ)
Dato' Seri	Dato’ Seri Setia DiRaja	Perlis	Knight Grand Companion of the Order of Prince Syed Sirajuddin Jamalullail of Perlis (SPSJ)
Dato' Seri	Dato’ Seri	Perlis	Knight Grand Commander of the Order of the Crown of Perlis (SPMP)
Dato' Seri	Dato’ Seri	Selangor	Knight Grand Commander of the Order of the Crown of Selangor (SPMS)
Dato' Seri	Dato’ Setia	Selangor	Knight Grand Companion of the Order of Sultan Sharafuddin Idris Shah (SSIS)
Dato' Seri	Dato’ Seri Utama	Terengganu	Knight of the Order of Sultan Mizan Zainal Abidin of Terengganu (SUMZ)
Dato' Seri	Dato’ Seri	Terengganu	Knight Grand Companion of the Order of Sultan Mizan Zainal Abidin of Terengganu (SSMZ)
Dato' Seri	Dato’ Seri	Terengganu	Member Grand Companion of the Order of Sultan Mahmud I of Terengganu (SSMT)
Dato' Sri	Dato' Sri Diraja	Pahang	Grand Royal Knight of the Grand Royal Order of Sultan Ahmad Shah of Pahang (SDSA)
Dato' Sri	Dato' Sri	Pahang	Grand Knight of the Order of Sultan Ahmad Shah of Pahang (SSAP)
Dato' Sri	Dato' Indera	Pahang	Grand Knight of the Order of the Crown of Pahang (SIMP)
Datuk Seri	Datuk Seri Utama	Federal Territory (Malaysia)	Grand Knight of Order of the Territorial Crown (SUMW)
Datuk Seri	Datuk Seri	Federal Territory (Malaysia)	Grand Commander of Order of the Territorial Crown (SMW)
Datuk Seri	Datuk Seri Utama	Malacca	Knight Grand Commander of Exalted Order of Malacca (DUNM)
Datuk Seri	Datuk Seri	Malacca	Grand Commander of Exalted Order of Malacca (DGSM)
Datuk Seri	Datuk Seri Panglima	Sabah	Grand Commander of Order of Kinabalu (SPDK)
Datuk	Datuk Patinggi	Sarawak	Knight Grand Commander of the Order of the Star of Hornbill Sarawak (DP)
Datuk	Datuk Amar	Sarawak	Knight Commander of the Order of the Star of Hornbill Sarawak (DA)
Dato	Datu	Sarawak	Order of Meritorious Service to Sarawak (DJBS)
Dato	Dato	Sarawak	Commander of the Most Exalted Order of the Star of Sarawak (PSBS)
Dato'	Dato'	Johor	Knight Grand Commander of the Order of the Crown of Johor (SPMJ)
Dato'	Dato’	Johor	Knight Grand Companion of the Order of Loyalty of Sultan Ismail of Johor (SSIJ)
Dato'	Dato’	Johor	Grand Knight of the Order of Sultan Ibrahim of Johor (SMIJ)
Dato'	Dato’	Johor	Knight Commander of the Order of the Crown of Johor (DPMJ)
Dato'	Dato’	Johor	Knight Companion of the Order of Loyalty of Sultan Ismail of Johor (DSIJ)
Dato'	Dato’	Johor	Knight of the Order of Sultan Ibrahim of Johor (DMIJ)
Dato'	Dato’ Paduka	Kedah	Knight Commander of the Order of Loyalty to Sultan Abdul Halim Mu'adzam Shah (DHMS)
Dato'	Dato’ Diraja	Kedah	(DMDK)
Dato'	Dato’ Wira	Kedah	Knight Commander of the Glorious Order of the Crown of Kedah (DGMK)
Dato'	Dato’	Kedah	Knight Commander of the Exalted Order of the Crown of Kedah (DPMK)
Dato'	Dato’	Kedah	Knight Companion of the Order of Loyalty to the Royal House of Kedah (DSDK)
Dato'	Dato’	Kelantan	Knight Grand Commander of the Order of the Crown of Kelantan (SPMK)
Dato'	Dato’	Kelantan	Knight Commander of the Order of the Crown of Kelantan (DPMK)
Dato'	Dato’	Kelantan	Knight Grand Commander of the Order of the Life of the Crown of Kelantan (SJMK)
Dato'	Dato’	Kelantan	Knight Commander of the Order of the Life of the Crown of Kelantan (DJMK)
Dato'	Dato’	Kelantan	Knight Grand Commander of the Order of the Noble Crown of Kelantan (SPKK)
Dato'	Dato’	Kelantan	Knight Commander of the Order of the Noble Crown of Kelantan (DPKK)
Dato'	Dato’	Kelantan	Knight Grand Commander of the Order of the Loyalty to the Crown of Kelantan (SPSK)
Dato'	Dato’	Kelantan	Knight Commander of the Order of the Loyalty to the Crown of Kelantan (DPSK)
Dato'	Dato’	Kelantan	Knight Grand Commander of the Order of the Services to the Crown of Kelantan (SPJK)
Dato'	Dato’	Kelantan	Knight Commander of the Order of the Services to the Crown of Kelantan (DPJK)
Dato'	Dato’	Negeri Sembilan	Knight of the Order of Loyalty to Negeri Sembilan (DSNS)
Dato'	Dato’	Negeri Sembilan	Knight Commander of the Order of Loyalty to Negeri Sembilan (DPNS)
Dato'	Dato’	Negeri Sembilan	Knight Commander of the Grand Order of Tuanku Jaafar (DPTJ)
Dato'	Dato’	Negeri Sembilan	Knight of the Order of Loyalty to Tuanku Muhriz (DSTM)
Dato'	Dato’	Negeri Sembilan	Knight of the Order of Loyal Service to Negeri Sembilan (DBNS)
Dato'	Dato'	Pahang	Knight Companion of the Order of Sultan Ahmad Shah of Pahang (DSAP)
Dato'	Dato'	Pahang	Knight Companion of the Order of the Crown of Pahang (DIMP)
Dato'	Dato'	Penang	Companion of the Order of the Defender of State (DMPN)
Dato'	Dato'	Penang	Officer of the Order of the Defender of State (DSPN)
Dato'	Dato’	Perak	Knight of the Order of Cura Si Manja Kini (DPCM)
Dato'	Dato’ Pahlawan	Perak	Knight Commander of the Order of Taming Sari (DPTS)
Dato'	Dato’	Perak	Knight Commander of the Order of the Perak State Crown (DPMP)
Dato'	Dato’ Paduka	Perlis	Knight Companion of the Order of the Gallant Prince Syed Sirajuddin Jamalullail (DSSJ)
Dato'	Dato’ Wira	Perlis	Grand Commander of the Order of Prince Syed Sirajuddin Jamalullail of Perlis (DWSJ)
Dato'	Dato’	Perlis	Knight Commander of the Order of the Crown of Perlis (DPMP)
Dato'	Dato’	Perlis	Knight Commander of the Order of the Gallant Prince Syed Sirajuddin Jamalullail (DSPJ)
Dato'	Dato’	Perlis	Knight Commander of the Order of the Gallant Prince Syed Putra Jamalullail (DPPJ)
Dato'	Dato’	Perlis	Knight Commander of the Order of Prince Syed Sirajuddin Jamalullail of Perlis (DPSJ)
Dato'	Dato’	Selangor	Knight Commander of the Order of the Crown of Selangor (DPMS)
Dato'	Dato’	Selangor	Knight Companion of the Order of Sultan Sharafuddin Idris Shah (DSIS)
Dato'	Dato’	Terengganu	Knight Grand Commander of the Order of the Crown of Terengganu (SPMT)
Dato'	Dato’	Terengganu	Knight Companion of the Order of Sultan Mizan Zainal Abidin of Terengganu (DSMZ)
Dato'	Dato’	Terengganu	Member Knight Companion of the Order of Sultan Mahmud I of Terengganu (DSMT)
Dato'	Dato’	Terengganu	Knight Commander of the Order of the Crown of Terengganu (DPMT)
Datuk	Datuk	Federal Territory (Malaysia)	Knight Commander of the Order of the Territorial Crown (PMW)
Datuk	Datuk Wira	Malacca	Knight Commander of the Exalted Order of Malacca (DCSM)
Datuk	Datuk	Malacca	Companion Class I of the Exalted Order of Malacca (DMSM)
Datuk	Datuk	Malacca	Companion Class II of the Exalted Order of Malacca (DPSM)
Datuk	Datuk	Sabah	Commander of the Order of Kinabalu (PGDK)
Datuk	Datuk	Sarawak	Grand Commander of the Order of the Star of Hornbill Sarawak (PGBK)

=== Pehin ===
This title is mainly used in Brunei Darussalam. An example of the title in Brunei would be Pehin Orang Kaya Laila Setia Bakti Di-Raja Dato Laila Utama Haji Awang Isa, the former Minister of Home Affairs and the current Special Adviser to the Sultan of Brunei. The titles refers to the traditional ministers posts in Brunei.

=== Pehin Sri ===
This title is mainly used in Sarawak. Awarded to individuals who have been appointed as Yang di-Pertua Negeri of Sarawak or equivalent or higher. An example of the title in Sarawak would be Tun Pehin Sri Dr. Haji Wan Junaidi Tuanku Jaafar, Yang di-Pertua Negeri of Sarawak.

=== Seri Setia ===
This title is mainly used in Malacca. Awarded to individuals who have been appointed as Yang di-Pertua Negeri of Malacca or equivalent or higher. An example of the title in Malacca would be Tun Seri Setia (Dr.) Haji Mohd Ali Rustam, Yang di-Pertua Negeri of Malacca.

=== JP ===
Justice of Peace (JP) ranks below all Dato' or Datuk. In Malaysia, Justices of Peace have largely been replaced in magistrates' courts by legally-qualified (first-class) stipendiary magistrates. However, state governments continue to appoint Justices of Peace as honours. In 2004, some associations of JPs pressed the federal government to allow JPs to sit as second-class magistrates to reduce the backlog of cases in the courts.

== Special cases ==
If a person has been awarded several honours from different states, the title used varies. For example, sometimes former Prime Minister, Mahathir Mohamad is usually referred to as YABhg Tun Dr. Mahathir Mohamad anywhere in Malaysia. However, different terms of address may be used in the states that he visits. In Sarawak, he will be referred to as YABhg Tun Pehin Sri Mahathir Mohamad as he received the Knight Grand Commander of the Order of the Star of Sarawak (SBS) from the Yang di-Pertua Negeri of Sarawak. While in Sabah, he is referred to as Tun Datuk Seri Panglima Dr. Mahathir Mohamad, as he received the Grand Commander of the Order of Kinabalu (SPDK) from the Yang di-Pertua Negeri of Sabah.

== Honorary styles ==
The following are used as styles, both before a person's title, and by themselves as forms of address:

- Tuan Yang Terutama (TYT) (lit. 'The Most Eminent Master') – the style of a state governor, equivalent to 'Your/His Excellency', and also as a title for serving Ambassadors to Malaysia, e.g. T.Y.T. Tuan Brian D. McFeeters. Previously, the archaic equivalent to the style His Excellency. This was used by Singapore, Indonesia, and in Malaysia; for other Republic's leaders, while the style for Governors / Yang di-Pertuas were Tuan Yang Terutama.
- Yang Amat Berhormat (YAB) (lit. 'The Right Honourable') – the style of the prime minister, the deputy prime minister, the Premier of Sarawak, the chief ministers and the Menteri Besars of the states, and Tuns who are members of parliament. It used to be 'the Right Honourable', but since Malaysia withdrew as a member of the Privy Council in 1985, the right to use 'Right Honourable' has been revoked.
- Yang Berhormat (YB) (lit. 'The Honourable') – the style of members of parliament and state legislative assemblymen. The prefix Yang Berhormat is also used for recipients of the First and Second Classes of the Johor's Orders of Chivalry who is titled Dato' for men and Datin Paduka for women, regardless of whether a member of parliament or not.
- Yang Berhormat Mulia (YBM) (lit. 'His/Her Noble Honour') – the style for a member of royalty who is also a member of parliament (e.g. Yang Berhormat Mulia Tengku Zulpuri Shah Raja Puji, the MP for Raub). This style is also used by royals with high ranking federal titles such as Tun (eg. Yang Berhormat Mulia Tun Raja Uda).
- Yang Amat Arif (YAA) (lit. 'The Very Wise') – the style of the Chief Justice of Malaysia, the President of the Court of Appeal of Malaysia, the Chief Judge of Malaya, and the Chief Judge of Sabah and Sarawak.
- Yang Arif (YA) (lit. 'The Wise') – the style of a judge of the Federal Court or Court of Appeal, as well a judicial commissioner or judge of the High Court of Malaya or the High Court of Sabah and Sarawak. It does not apply to session court judges or magistrates.
- Yang Amat Berbahagia (YABhg) (lit. 'The Most Honourable') – the style of persons with the titles Tun or Toh Puan, and the spouses of state governors, the spouse of the prime minister, the spouse of the deputy prime minister, as well as the spouses of state chief ministers.
- Yang Berbahagia (YBhg) (lit. 'The Honourable') (and variants thereof) – the styles of persons with a chivalrous title.
- Yang Hormat (YHmt) (The Honourable) – the style for recipients of the First and Second Classes of the Pahang's Orders of Chivalry.
- Yang Dihormati (YDhmti) (The Respected) – the wife of a recipient of the Johor State Order of Merit conferred by the Sultan of Johor, whose husband is titled The Honourable Dato', The Respected Datin wife's name with Dato' husband's name or Dato' husband's surname after the wife's name, for example.

The English versions of these styles follow Commonwealth usage. Thus the prime minister, cabinet ministers, senators, state executive councillors and judges of the High Court and above are styled the Honourable or the Right Honourable.

== Noble family hereditary titles ==
Malay noble titles are family hereditary titles which signify an individual’s social rank, lineage, and connection to ruling families within Malay society. Socially, they function as markers of identity and precedence as these titles are naturally used by Malay royal and aristocratic families. Bearers of the royal title Raja/Tengku/Tunku/Engku/Ungku/Megat/Puteri/Syed/Sharifah are formally addressed as His/Her Highness which is put before the respective hereditary title.

legally, the rights to use these titles are regulated by the Malaysian government and restricted to only individuals within the families. A title is put before a name (His/Her Highness + Title + Given name) eg., His Highness Tengku Iskandar.

Inheritance follows a paternal mechanism, whereby titles are transmitted through the male line. Accordingly, a marriage between a titled female and a non-titled male may result in their children bearing a lower title or cease to be passed down depending on the rank of the female's title.

Royal titles:

- Raja, (means king) royal title inherited by the children (male and female) of a royal father with the title Raja used by members of the Perak Royal Family. Engku is often used to politely address senior members of the Perak Royal Family.
- Megat, royal title inherited by the sons of a royal female titled Raja who marries a commoner husband. This title is used by Perak royalties indicating half-blood royalty. The sons of a Megat have the right to inherit this title. However, daughters of a Megat and also daughters of a female Raja who marries a commoner bear the title Puteri:
  - Puteri, (means Princess) female version title equivalent to Megat. Inherited by the daughters of a royal female titled Raja who marries a commoner husband indicating a Half-blood Royal. Additionally, the daughters of a Megat will also inherit the title Puteri. However, if a Puteri marries a commoner, their children will not bear nor inherit any title.
- Tunku, Tengku, (derived from Tuanku) royal title inherited through a royal father with such title used by members of the Johor, Pahang, Terengganu, Selangor, Kelantan, Negeri Sembilan and Kedah royal families.
- Engku, Ungku, royal title inherited (non ruling royal house) through a royal father with such title used by members of the Terengganu, Pahang and Johor.
- Pengiran, royal title equivalent to Raja/Tengku/Tunku, inherited through a royal father and used by members of Brunei Royal Family.

Noble titles:

- Syed, is a title inherited by male descendants, through the male line, from the Islamic prophet Muhammad via his grandsons Hassan and Hussein. This title is also used by the members of Perlis Royal Family, House of Jamullail, tracing the House's lineage back to Prophet Muhammad.
  - Sharifah, is the female version of Syed, inherited by female descendants of a Syed.
    - Meor is a title inherited by the male children of a Sharifah with a non-Syed husband.
- Wan, (derived from Pahlawan which means commander/warrior) historically a title granted to high-ranking nobilities eg., army chiefs, ministers, during the 16th century in Kedah, Pahang and some parts of Kelantan. Some families are able to retain this title until today, indicating their distant noble lineage. This title is inherited by the children (male and female) of a male Wan. The children of a female Wan and a non-Wan husband will inherit Che.
- Nik, historically a title used only by Kelanatanese high-ranking nobilities and some royalties in the 16th century Kelantan. Modern day Kelantanese royalties have changed their title into Tengku since the 18th century. The Nik family of Kelantan still retains this title in their names. This title is inherited by the children (male and female) of male Nik. The children of a female Nik and a non-Nik husband will inherit Wan.

== Other titles ==
- Haji (or Hajah for female) can be used by people who have completed the Hajj. This title is abbreviated as 'Hj.' or 'Hjh.'.
- Tuan literally means 'master'. Due to its colonial overtones, this term is mostly obsolete. In some states like Kelantan, Pattani means Prince / Princess. A hereditary (paternal) title from one of the lineages of the Royal Family. In addition Tuan as an equivalent of Sir, it is used in formal correspondence. When addressing an audience, the plural form 'tuan-tuan' (gentlemen) is used, usually combined as 'tuan-tuan dan puan-puan' (gentlemen and ladies).
- Encik (abbreviated 'En.') is equivalent to Mr., and can be used by all men. Warrant Officers in the Singapore Armed Forces are also referred to as Encik informally.
- Puan (abbreviated 'Pn.') can be used by all married women. It is equivalent to Madam, not Mrs., as most married women in Malay-speaking countries do not use the names or surnames of their husbands. For married women who use their husbands' names, they can be addressed as Puan (husband's name). It is also used in formal correspondence. When addressing an audience, the plural form 'puan-puan' (ladies) is used, usually combined with 'tuan-tuan' as 'tuan-tuan dan puan-puan'.
- Cik is equivalent to Miss, and can be used by all unmarried women.

== Related issues ==
Not all Datuks have lived exemplary lives, and some have been convicted of crimes. The various rulers have recently taken steps to ensure the integrity of the institution by means of consultation and the revoking of the given titles.

Mahathir Mohamad mentioned that one of the problems with titles in Malaysia is the numbers of them given out. He stated in an interview "Personally, I feel if you want to give value to anything, it must be limited... if you produce a million Ferrari cars, nobody will care about buying a Ferrari."

In the first government following the independence of Malaya in 1957, 5 of 15 cabinet Ministers were Datuks. The Minister of Finance of Malaysia at the time, Tan Siew Sin, held the title Justice of Peace. Later, he was granted a Federal award which carried the title Tun. The father of Malayan independence, Tunku Abdul Rahman Putra Al-Haj, received no awards and carried the title Tunku, which he inherited as the prince of the state of Kedah. He was honorarily referred to as Yang Teramat Mulia (YTM). The Senate held only 14 Datuks, and House of Representatives held only seven.

The Malacca government was criticised for awarding the Datuk title to a non-Malaysian Indian actor, Shah Rukh Khan, for making movies and promoting the Malacca state internationally.

In 2024, the Yang di-Pertuan Agong, Sultan Ibrahim Iskandar of Johor, stated "If a recipient is found to have tarnished the country’s image or commits a crime and has been punished by the court, then the award will be withdrawn. (Say) Goodbye to it." He also stated that "Accordingly, I have instructed the government to check the list of inmates in all prisons. I want any inmate with federal awards or honours to have their award withdrawn. This is only for federal awards and honours. As for awards conferred by other states, I do not interfere".

The Sultan Nazrin Shah of Perak has criticized the exploitation of Perak royal titles.

=== Johor ===
- The Sultan of Johor revoked the titles of four Dato's in 2010.

=== Malaysia ===
- In 2026, the Yang di-Pertuan Agong revoked Mohd Isa Abdul Samad's Panglima Setia Mahkota award, which carries the “Tan Sri” title.

=== Negeri Sembilan ===
- In 2018, the Yang di-Pertuan Besar of Negeri Sembilan revoked the state honours bestowed upon Mohammad Najib Abdul Razak and his wife, Rosmah Mansor.

=== Pahang ===
- The Sultan of Pahang revoked the titles of two Dato's in 2004.

=== Selangor ===
- The Dato's of Selangor attempted to set up an association of Selangor Dato's. It received approval from the registrar of societies, but was shelved when the Sultan forbade any Dato' from joining or otherwise risk losing their title.
- Four Datuks were removed in 2003 by the Sultan of Selangor.
- Dato' Seri Anwar Ibrahim had his title revoked by the Sultan of Selangor on 3 November 2014.
- In 2019, the Sultan of Selangor revoked the state honours bestowed upon Najib Razak and his wife, Rosmah Mansor, on 12 September 2022.

== See also ==
- Bendahara
- Datu – Philippine equivalent of Malay term Dato
- Datuak – traditional title in Minangkabau community
- Malay nobility
- Style (manner of address)
- Yang di-Pertuan Negara
