= Order of the Gallant Prince Syed Putra Jamalullail =

The Most Esteemed Order of the Gallant Prince Syed Putra Jamalullail Darjah Kebesaran Tuanku Syed Putra Jamalullail Yang Amat Dihormati

Awarded by Raja of Perlis
- Type: Order of chivalry
- Founded: 22 June 1995
- Royal house: House of Jamalullail
- Awarded for: recognising and rewarding meritorious contributions to Tuanku Sir Syed Putra
- Status: Made obsolete in 2001 but appointments revived in 2007
- Founder: Tuanku Sir Syed Putra Jamalullail
- Grand Master: Tuanku Syed Sirajuddin Putra Jamalullail
- Grades: Grand Companion (SSPJ); Companion (DSPJ); Lieutenant (DPPJ)
- Post-nominals: S.S.P.J.; D.S.P.J.; D.P.P.J.

Statistics
- First induction: 1995
- Last induction: 2000

Precedence
- Next (higher): Order of Prince Syed Sirajuddin Jamalullail of Perlis
- Next (lower): Order of the Crown of Perlis
- Grand Companion Companion Lieutenant; Ribbon bars

The Most Esteemed Order of the Gallant Prince Syed Putra Jamalullail (Malay: Darjah Kebesaran Tuanku Syed Putra Jamalullail Yang Amat Dihormati) is an order of chivalry in the state of Perlis which was established on 22 June 1995 by the Raja of Perlis, Tuanku Sir Syed Putra Jamalullail. The order was established to recognise and reward meritorious contributions by individuals to Raja Tuanku Sir Syed Putra Jamalullail and the House of Jamalullail. The order became obsolete following the death of Tuanku Syed Putra in 2000, however, the appointments were revived in 2007 by his son and the Raja of Perlis, Tuanku Syed Sirajuddin Putra Jamalullail.

== Classes ==
The Order of the Gallant Prince Syed Putra Jamalullail was conferred in three grades:

- Grand Companion (S.S.P.J.) with title Dato’ Seri Diraja
- Companion (D.S.P.J.) with title Dato’
- Lieutenant (D.P.P.J.) with title Dato’

== Recipients ==
- Ref:

=== Grand Companion (S.S.P.J.) ===
- 1995: Tuanku Syed Putra Jamalullail (Founder)
- 1995: Raja Perempuan Budriah
- 1995: Tengku Syed Sirajuddin Jamalullail
- 1995: Tuanku Tengku Fauziah
- 1995: Anwar Ibrahim
- 1996: Sharifah Jalina Jamalullail
- 1996: Tengku Syed Amir Abidin Jamalullail
- 1996: Tengku Sharifah Azwan Jamalullail
- 1996: Tengku Syed Badarudin Jamalullail
- 1996: Tengku Sharifah Salwa Jamalullail
- 1999: Tengku Syed Zainol Anwar Jamalullail
- 1999: Tengku Syed Razlan Jamalullail
- 1999: Syed Mahmood Syed Hussain

=== Companion (D.S.P.J.) ===
- 1999: Ruby Abdul Majeed
- 1999: Tengku Noor Zakiah
- 1999: Tengku Sharifah Hishmah
- 1999: Tengku Nor Zehan
- 1999: Tengku Ilham Malina

=== Lieutenant (D.P.P.J.) ===
- 1999: Khor Liang Tee
- 1999: Jaafar Abdul Wahid
- 1999: Rosli Ibrahim
- 1999: Mokhzani Ismail
- 1999: Azhar Mansor
- 1999: Idrus Kassim
- 1999: Talib bin Ali
- 1999: Hiroshi Masuzawa
- 2000: Ahmad Mahdzan Ayob
- 2000: Halipah Esa
- 2000: Wan Mohamad Nasir Wan Othman
- 2000: Jamaludin Ibrahim
- 2000: Ghazali Mat Ariff

== See also ==
- Orders, decorations, and medals of the Malaysian states and federal territories#Perlis
- Orders, decorations, and medals of Perlis
- List of post-nominal letters (Perlis)
