= Orders, decorations, and medals of Terengganu =

The following is the orders, decorations, and medals given by the sultan of Terengganu. When applicable, post-nominal letters and non-hereditary titles are indicated.

== Order of precedence for the wearing of order insignias, decorations, and medals ==
Precedence:

1.	Darjah Utama Kerabat Terengganu Yang Amat Mulia	D.K.T.	--
2.	Darjah Kerabat DiRaja Terengganu Yang Amat Mulia Darjah Yang Pertama	D.K.R. I	--
3.	Darjah Kebesaran Kerabat Terengganu Yang Amat Mulia Darjah Yang Pertama	D.K. I	--	Max. 16 pers.
4.	Darjah Kerabat DiRaja Terengganu Yang Amat Mulia Darjah Yang Kedua	D.K.R. II	--
5.	Darjah Kebesaran Kerabat Terengganu Yang Amat Mulia Darjah Yang Kedua	D.K. II	--	Max. 24 pers.
6.	Seri Utama Sultan Mizan Zainal Abidin Terengganu	S.U.M.Z.	Dato’ Seri Utama
7.	Seri Setia Sultan Mizan Zainal Abidin Terengganu	S.S.M.Z.	Dato’ Seri
8.	Seri Setia Sultan Mahmud Terengganu	S.S.M.T.	Dato’ Seri
9.	Seri Paduka Mahkota Terengganu	S.P.M.T.	Dato’	Max. 25 pers.
10.	Dato' Setia Sultan Mizan Zainal Abidin Terengganu	D.S.M.Z.	Dato’
11.	Dato' Setia Sultan Mahmud Terengganu	D.S.M.T.	Dato’
12.	Dato' Paduka Mahkota Terengganu	D.P.M.T.	Dato’	Max. 50 pers.
13.	Setia Sultan Mizan Zainal Abidin Terengganu	S.M.Z.	--
14.	Ahli Setia Sultan Mahmud Terengganu	A.S.M.	--
15.	Setia Mahkota Terengganu	S.M.T.	--	Max. 100 pers.
16.	Ahli Sultan Mizan Zainal Abidin Terengganu	A.M.Z	--
17.	Ahli Mahkota Terengganu	A.M.T.	--	Max. 200 pers.
18.	Bintang Keberanian Handal	B.K.H.	--
19.	Pingat Keberanian Handal	P.K.H.	--
20.	Pingat Pekerti Terpilih	P.P.T.	--
21.	Pingat Jasa Cemerlang	P.J.C.	--
22.	Pingat Jasa Kebaktian	P.J.K.	--
23.	Bintang Lama Berjawatan	B.L.B.	--
24.	Pingat Lama Berjawatan	P.L.B.	--

== Orders, decorations, and medals ==
The Most Exalted Supreme Royal Family Order of Terengganu - Darjah Utama Kerabat Diraja Terengganu Yang Amat Dihormati

- Founded by Sultan Mahmud al-Muktafi Billah Shah on 10 March 1981.
- Limited to ruling princes and awarded in one class, Member or Ahli - D.K.T.

The Most Distinguished Royal Family Order of Terengganu - Darjah Kerabat Diraja Terengganu Yang Amat Mulia

- Founded by Sultan Mizan Zainal Abidin on 6 July 2000 as a family order for members of the Trengganu and other Royal houses.
- Awarded in one class, Member or Ahli - D.K.R.

The Most Distinguished Family Order of Terengganu - Darjah Kebesaran Kerabat Terengganu Yang Amat Mulia

- Founded by Sultan Ismail Nasiruddin Shah on 19 June 1962 as a family order for members of the Trengganu and other royal houses.
- Awarded in two classes :
  - 1. First Class or Ahli Yang Pertama (Max. 16 recipients at any one time) - D.K. I
  - 2. Second Class or Ahli Yang Kedua (Max. 24 recipients) - D.K. II

The Most Select Order of Sultan Mizan Zainal Abidin of Terengganu - Darjah Kebesaran Sultan Mizan Zainal Abidin Terengganu Yang Amat Terpilih

- Founded by Sultan Sultan Mizan Zainal Abidin on 6 July 2001
- Awarded in a supreme class, Sri Utama (established 26 May 2005) - SUMZ and four ordinary classes :
  - 1. Grand Companion or Dato’ Sri Setia - S.S.M.Z.
  - 2. Companion or Dato’ Setia - D.S.M.Z.
  - 3. Officer or Setia - S.M.Z.
  - 4. Member or Ahli - A.M.Z.

The Most Revered Order of Sultan Mahmud I of Terengganu - Darjah Kebesaran Sultan Mahmud I Terengganu Yang Amat Terpuji

- Founded by Sultan Mahmud al-Muktafi Billah Shah on 28 February 1982.
- Awarded in three classes :
  - 1. Grand Companion or Darjah Seri Setia (Max. 16 recipients) - S.S.M.T.
  - 2. Companion or Darjah Dato’ Setia (Max. 32 recipients) - D.S.M.T.
  - 3. Member or Ahli Setia (Max. 60 recipients) - A.S.M.

The Most Distinguished Order of the Crown of Terengganu - Darjah Kebesaran Mahkota Terengganu Yang Amat Mulia

- Founded by Sultan Ismail Nasiruddin Shah on 19 June 1962.
- Awarded in four classes :
  - 1. Grand Commander or Dato’ Sri Paduka (Max. 25 recipients) - S.P.M.T.
  - 2. Commander or Dato’ Paduka (Max. 50 recipients) - D.P.M.T.
  - 3. Companion or Setia (Max. 100 recipients) - S.M.T.
  - 4. Member or Ahli (Max. 200 recipients) - A.M.T.

Conspicuous Gallantry Star - Bintang Keberanian Handal

- Instituted by Sultan Mahmud al-Muktafi Billah Shah on 7 July 1981 to reward supreme acts of gallantry within the borders of the state of Trengganu or by Trengganu subjects. Limited to officers.
- Awarded in a single class, silver star (B.K.H.).

Conspicuous Gallantry Medal - Pingat Keberanian Handal

- Instituted by Sultan Ismail Nasiruddin Shah on 22 June 1951 as a reward for supreme acts of gallantry within the borders of the state of Trengganu or by Trengganu subjects. Limited to non-commissioned officers and other ranks after 1981.
- Awarded in a single class, silver medal (P.K.H.).

Distinguished Service Medal - Pingat Jasa Cemerlang

- Instituted by Sultan Mahmud al-Muktafi Billah Shah on 10 March 1981 to reward distinguished services to the state.
- Awarded in a single class, silver medal (P.J.C.).

Distinguished Conduct Medal - Pingat Pekerti Terpilih

- Instituted by Sultan Ismail Nasiruddin Shah on 22 June 1951 as a reward for acts of bravery and distinguished conduct within the borders of the state of Trengganu or by Trengganu subjects.
- Awarded in a single class, nickel medal (P.P.T.).

Meritorious Service Medal - Pingat Jasa Kebaktian

- Instituted by Sultan Ismail Nasiruddin Shah on 22 June 1951 as a reward for meritorious services to the state.
- Awarded in a single class, bronze medal (P.J.K.).

Long Service and Good Conduct Star - Bintang Kerana Lama Berjawatan dan Baik Pekerti

- Instituted by Sultan Ismail Nasiruddin Shah on 10 January 1955 as a reward for twenty-one years of continuous long service and good conduct in state service, at the level of officer or executive, or above.
- Awarded in a single class, six pointed silver star (B.L.B.).

Long Service and Good Conduct Medal - Pingat Kerana Lama Berjawatan dan Baik Pekerti

- Instituted by Sultan Ismail Nasiruddin Shah on 10 January 1955 as a reward for twenty-one years of continuous long service and good conduct in state service, at the non-executive level or below.
- Awarded in a single class, a medal in white metal (P.L.B.).

Jubilee Medal - Pingat Jubli

- Instituted by Sultan Ismail Nasiruddin Shah to commemorate his silver jubilee in 1970.
- Awarded in a single class, silver medal.

Defence Medal - Pingat Pertahanan

- Instituted by Sultan Mahmud al-Muktafi Billah Shah in 1972 as a medal of service.
- Awarded in a single class, silver medal.

Installation Medal 1970 - Pingat Pertabalan 1970

- Instituted by Sultan Mahmud al-Muktafi Billah Shah to commemorate his installation as sultan in 1970.
- Awarded in a single class, silver medal.

Installation Medal 1998 - Pingat Pertabalan 1998

- Instituted by Sultan Mizan Zainal Abidin to commemorate his installation as sultan in 1998.
- Awarded in a single class, silver medal.

== See also ==
- Orders, decorations, and medals of the Malaysian states and federal territories#Terengganu
- List of post-nominal letters (Terengganu)
