= Order of precedence in Terengganu =

Relative preeminence of officials for ceremonial purposes

The Terengganu order of precedence is a nominal and symbolic hierarchy of important positions within the state of Terengganu. It has no legal standing but is used to dictate ceremonial protocol at events of a state nature.

== Order of precedence ==
Order of precedence in Terengganu is as follows:

No.	Description
1	His Royal Highness The Sultan
2	Her Royal Highness Sultanah
3	His Royal Highness The Regent
4	His Highness The Yang di-Pertuan Muda
5	Her Highness The Tengku Puan Muda (vacant as of 2021)
6	Tengku Ampuan Intan Zaharah (died on 24 January 2015)
7	Tengku Ampuan Bariah (died on 21 March 2011)
8	the Tengku Besar, the Sultan's mother
9	Chairman of the Council of Regency (vacant as of 2021)
10	Members of the Council of Regency (vacant as of 2021)
11	the Menteri Besar
12	the Sultan's children
13	the Tengku Sri Bendahara
14	the Tengku Sri Panglima Raja; the Tengku Sri Temenggong Raja; the Tengku Sri Paduka Raja; the Tengku Sri Laksamana Raja
15	Members of the extended State Royal Family
16	Distinguished Members of the Most Exalted Supreme Royal Family Order of Terengganu (DKT); Members of the Most Exalted Supreme Royal Family Order of Terengganu (DKR); Members of the Most Distinguished Family Order of Terengganu (DK)
17	First-class Members of the Most Distinguished Family Order of Terengganu (DK I); Second-class Members of the Most Distinguished Family Order of Terengganu (DK II)
18	Knight Grand Commander of the Most Select Order of Sultan Mizan Zainal Abidin of Terengganu (SUMZ)
19	Chairperson of the Royal Court
20	Speaker of the Legislative Assembly
20A	Former Menteris Besar (ordered by departure from office): 1. Wan Mokhtar Ahmad (2 December 1999); 2. Abdul Hadi Awang MP (25 March 2004); 3. Idris Jusoh MP (25 March 2008); 4. Ahmad Said MLA (12 May 2014); 5. Ahmad Razif Abdul Rahman MLA (10 May 2018)
20B	Judges of the High Court
21	State Secretary
22	State Legal Adviser
23	State Financial Officer
24	Members of the Executive Council; Members of the Royal Court; State Mufti
25	Chief of Ceremonies
26	Knight Commanders of the Most Select Order of Sultan Mizan Zainal Abidin of Terengganu (SSMZ)
27	the Kerabat
28	Grand Commanders of the Most Revered Order of Sultan Mahmud I of Terengganu (SSMT)
29	Grand Commanders of the Most Distinguished Order of the Crown of Terengganu (SPMT)
30	the Orang-orang Besar Raja
31	Leader of the Opposition of the Legislative Assembly
32	Chairperson of the State Public Service Commission
33	Chief Judge of the State High Syarie Court; Chairperson of the State Islamic and Malay Affairs Council
34	Commanders of the Most Select Order of Sultan Mizan Zainal Abidin of Terengganu (DSMZ)
35	Commanders of the Most Revered Order of Sultan Mahmud I of Terengganu (DSMT)
35A	Commander of the 8th Infantry Brigade
35B	State Police Chief
36	Members of the Legislative Assembly; Commanders of the Most Distinguished Order of the Crown of Terengganu (DPMT)
36A	Senators
36B	Members of the House of Representatives
37	JUSA Grade officers
38	Grade 54 officers
39	Deputy Chairperson of the State Islamic and Malay Affairs Council; Deputy Chairperson of the State Public Service Commission
40	Grade 52 officers
41	Members of the State Public Service Commission; Members of the State Islamic and Malay Affairs Council; Members of the State Fatwa Committee
42	Companions of the Most Select Order of Sultan Mizan Zainal Abidin of Terengganu (SMZ); Companions of the Most Revered Order of Sultan Mahmud I of Terengganu (SMT); Companions of the Most Distinguished Order of the Crown of Terengganu (PMT)
43	Grade 48 officers
44	Members of the Most Select Order of Sultan Mizan Zainal Abidin of Terengganu (AMZ); Members of the Most Distinguished Order of the Crown of Terengganu (AMT); Justices of the Peace
45	Headmen

== See also ==
- List of post-nominal letters (Terengganu)
