= List of post-nominal letters (Terengganu) =

This is a list of post-nominal letters used in Terengganu. The order in which they follow an individual's name is the same as the order of precedence for the wearing of order insignias, decorations, and medals. When applicable, non-hereditary titles are indicated.

Grades		Post-nominal	Title	Wife's title	Ribbon
The Most Exalted Supreme Royal Family Order of Terengganu (10/03/1981); Darjah Utama Kerabat Diraja Terengganu Yang Amat Dihormati
Member	Ahli	D.K.T.	--	--	
The Most Distinguished Royal Family Order of Terengganu (06/07/2000); Darjah Kerabat Diraja Terengganu Yang Amat Mulia
First Class	Ahli Yang Pertama	D.K.R. I	--	--	
Second Class	Ahli Yang Kedua	D.K.R. II	--	--	
The Most Distinguished Family Order of Terengganu (19/06/1962); Darjah Kebesaran Kerabat Terengganu Yang Amat Mulia
First Class	Ahli Yang Pertama	D.K. I	--	--	
Second Class	Ahli Yang Kedua	D.K. II	--	--	
The Most Select Order of Sultan Mizan Zainal Abidin of Terengganu (6/07/2001, SUMZ 26/05/2005); Darjah Kebesaran Sultan Mizan Zainal Abidin Terengganu Yang Amat Terpilih
Supreme Class	Sri Utama Sultan Mizan Zainal Abidin Terengganu	S.U.M.Z.	Dato' Seri Utama	To' Puan Seri Utama	
Knight Grand Companion	Dato' Sri Setia Sultan Mizan Zainal Abidin Terengganu	S.S.M.Z.	Dato' Seri	To' Puan Seri	
Knight Companion	Dato' Setia Sultan Mizan Zainal Abidin Terengganu	D.S.M.Z.	Dato'	To' Puan	
Companion	Setia Sultan Mizan Zainal Abidin Terengganu	S.M.Z.	--	--	
Member	Ahli Sultan Mizan Zainal Abidin Terengganu	A.M.Z.	--	--	
The Most Revered Order of Sultan Mahmud I of Terengganu (28/02/1982, obsolete honorific order); Darjah Kebesaran Sultan Mahmud I Terengganu Yang Amat Terpuji
Member Grand Companion	Ahli Sri Setia Sultan Mahmud I Terengganu	S.S.M.T.	Dato' Seri	To' Puan Seri	
Member Knight Companion	Ahli Dato' Setia Sultan Mahmud I Terengganu	D.S.M.T.	Dato'	To' Puan	
Member Companion	Ahli Setia Sultan Mahmud I Terengganu	A.S.M.	--	--	
The Most Distinguished Order of the Crown of Terengganu (19/06/1962); Darjah Kebesaran Mahkota Terengganu Yang Amat Mulia
Knight Grand Commander	Dato' Sri Paduka Mahkota Terengganu	S.P.M.T.	Dato'	To' Puan	
Knight Commander	Dato' Paduka Mahkota Terengganu	D.P.M.T.	Dato'	To' Puan	
Companion	Setia Mahkota Terengganu	S.M.T.	--	--	
Member	Ahli Mahkota Terengganu	A.M.T.	--	--	
Conspicuous Gallantry Star - Bintang Keberanian Handal
Silver Star	Bintang Keberanian Handal	B.K.H.	--	--	
Conspicuous Gallantry Medal - Pingat Keberanian Handal
Silver Star	Pingat Keberanian Handal	P.K.H.	--	--	
Distinguished Service Medal - Pingat Jasa Cemerlang
Silver Medal	Pingat Jasa Cemerlang	P.J.C.	--	--	
Distinguished Conduct Medal - Pingat Pekerti Terpilih
Nickel Medal	Pingat Pekerti Terpilih	P.P.T.	--	--	
Meritorious Service Medal - Pingat Jasa Kebaktian
Bronze Medal	Pingat Jasa Kebaktian	P.J.K.	--	--	
Long Service and Good Conduct Star - Bintang Kerana Lama Berjawatan dan Baik Pekerti
Six-pointed silver star	Bintang Kerana Lama Berjawatan dan Baik Pekerti	B.L.B.	--	--	
Long Service and Good Conduct Medal - Pingat Kerana Lama Berjawatan dan Baik Pekerti
Medal in white metal	Pingat Kerana Lama Berjawatan dan Baik Pekerti	P.L.B.	--	--	
Jubilee Medal - Pingat Jubli
Silver Medal	Pingat Jubli	--	--	--	
Defence Medal - Pingat Pertahanan
Silver Medal	Pingat Pertahanan	--	--	--	
Installation Medal 1970 - Pingat Pertabalan 1970
Silver Medal	Pingat Pertabalan 1970	--	--	--	
Installation Medal 1998 - Pingat Pertabalan 1998
Silver Medal	Pingat Pertabalan 1998	--	--	--	

== See also ==
- Orders, decorations, and medals of Terengganu
- Order of precedence in Terengganu
