= Orders, decorations, and medals of the Malaysian states and federal territories =

Malaysia federal award

The orders, decorations, and medals of the Malaysian states and federal territories, in which each state and federal territory of Malaysia has devised a system of orders and awards to honour residents for actions or deeds that benefit their local community or state, are in turn subsumed within the Malaysian honours system. Each state sets their own rules and criteria on eligibility and also how each medal is awarded and presented. Most of the orders allow for the recipient to wear their orders in public, and most grant the recipients the use of post-nominal letters in their names.

== States and federal territories orders, decorations, and medals ==
The State Honours are honours given by state rulers. Johor was the first state to have its own awards on 31 July 1886. Later, the other Malay states did the same.

=== Federal Territories ===
The orders, decorations, and medals given by Yang di-Pertuan Agong are:

Ribbon	Name (English/Malay)	Ranks / Letters	Honorific title	Instituted	Awarded to/for
Orders
	The Most Distinguished Order of the Territorial Crown; Darjah Yang Mulia Mahkota Wilayah	Grand Knight (S.U.M.W.)	Datuk Seri Utama	2008	Founded by Tuanku Mizan Zainal Abidin as a reward for contributions and services rendered within the three Federal Territories or by residents of these.
	The Most Distinguished Order of the Territorial Crown; Darjah Yang Mulia Mahkota Wilayah	Grand Commander (S.M.W.)	Datuk Seri	2008	Founded by Tuanku Mizan Zainal Abidin as a reward for contributions and services rendered within the three Federal Territories or by residents of these.
	The Most Distinguished Order of the Territorial Crown; Darjah Yang Mulia Mahkota Wilayah	Commander (P.M.W.)	Datuk	2008	Founded by Tuanku Mizan Zainal Abidin as a reward for contributions and services rendered within the three Federal Territories or by residents of these.
	The Most Distinguished Order of the Territorial Crown; Darjah Yang Mulia Mahkota Wilayah	Companion (J.M.W.)		2008	Founded by Tuanku Mizan Zainal Abidin as a reward for contributions and services rendered within the three Federal Territories or by residents of these.
	The Most Distinguished Order of the Territorial Crown; Darjah Yang Mulia Mahkota Wilayah	Officer (K.M.W.)		2008	Founded by Tuanku Mizan Zainal Abidin as a reward for contributions and services rendered within the three Federal Territories or by residents of these.
	The Most Distinguished Order of the Territorial Crown; Darjah Yang Mulia Mahkota Wilayah	Member (A.M.W.)		2008	Founded by Tuanku Mizan Zainal Abidin as a reward for contributions and services rendered within the three Federal Territories or by residents of these.
	The Most Distinguished Order of the Territorial Crown; Darjah Yang Mulia Mahkota Wilayah	Medal (P.P.W.)		2008	Founded by Tuanku Mizan Zainal Abidin as a reward for contributions and services rendered within the three Federal Territories or by residents of these.

=== Non royal states ===
==== Malacca ====
The orders, decorations, and medals given by Yang di-Pertua Negeri of Malacca are:

Orders
Ribbon	Name (English/Malay)	Ranks / Letters	Instituted	Awarded to/for
	Premier and Faithful Exalted Order of Malacca; Darjah Seri Paduka Setia Melaka	Knight Grand Commander (S.P.S.M.)	2020	Founded by Governor Mohd. Ali Rustam.
	Premier and Exalted Order of Malacca; Darjah Utama Negeri Melaka	Knight Grand Commander (D.U.N.M.)	1978	Founded by Governor Syed Zahiruddin.
	Exalted Order of Malacca; Darjah Seri Melaka	Grand Commander (D.G.S.M.); Darjah Gemilang Seri Melaka	1978, rev. 1983	Founded by Governor Syed Zahiruddin.
	Exalted Order of Malacca; Darjah Seri Melaka	Knight Commander (D.C.S.M.); Darjah Cemerlang Seri Melaka	1978	Founded by Governor Syed Zahiruddin.
	Exalted Order of Malacca; Darjah Seri Melaka	Companion 1st Class (D.M.S.M.); Darjah Mulia Seri Melaka	1978	Founded by Governor Syed Zahiruddin.
	Exalted Order of Malacca; Darjah Seri Melaka	Companion 2nd Class (D.P.S.M.); Darjah Pangkuan Seri Melaka	1978	Founded by Governor Syed Zahiruddin.
	Exalted Order of Malacca; Darjah Seri Melaka	Member (D.S.M.); Darjah Seri Melaka	1978	Founded by Governor Syed Zahiruddin.
Stars and Medals			1978	
Ribbon	Name (English/Malay)	Ranks / Letters	Instituted	Awarded to/for
	Distinguished Service Star; Bintang Cemerlang Melaka	B.C.M.		as a reward for distinguished service.
	Justice of the Peace; Jaksa Pendamai	J.P.	1978	Instituted by Governor Syed Zahiruddin.
	Supreme Gallantry Star; Bintang Gagah Perkasa	B.G.P.	1978	Instituted by Governor Syed Zahiruddin.
	Commendable Service Star; Bintang Khidmat Terpuji	B.K.T.	1978	Instituted by Governor Syed Zahiruddin.
	Meritorious Service Medal; Pingat Jasa Kebaktian	P.J.K.	1978	Instituted by Governor Syed Zahiruddin.
	Government Service Medal; Pingat Bakti Masyarakat	P.B.M.	1978	Instituted by Governor Syed Zahiruddin.
	Long Service Medal; Pingat Khidmat Lama	P.K.L.	1978	Instituted by Governor Syed Zahiruddin.
	Youth Service Medal; Pingat Bakti Belia	P.B.B.	1978	Instituted by Governor Syed Zahiruddin.

==== Penang ====
The orders, decorations, and medals given by Yang di-Pertua Negeri of Penang are:

Orders
Ribbon	Name (English/Malay)	Ranks / Letters	Instituted	Awarded to/for
	Order of the Defender of State; Darjah Pangkuan Negeri	Knight Grand Commander (D.U.P.N.)	1967	Founded by Governor Raja Uda as a reward for exceptional service by the people of Penang.
	Order of the Defender of State; Darjah Pangkuan Negeri	Knight Commander (D.P.P.N.)	2003	Founded by Governor Raja Uda as a reward for exceptional service by the people of Penang.
	Order of the Defender of State; Darjah Pangkuan Negeri	Commander (D.G.P.N.)	1996	Founded by Governor Raja Uda as a reward for exceptional service by the people of Penang.
	Order of the Defender of State; Darjah Pangkuan Negeri	Companion (D.M.P.N.)	1967	Founded by Governor Raja Uda as a reward for exceptional service by the people of Penang.
	Order of the Defender of State; Darjah Pangkuan Negeri	Officer (D.S.P.N.)	1976	Founded by Governor Raja Uda as a reward for exceptional service by the people of Penang.
	Order of the Defender of State; Darjah Pangkuan Negeri	Member (D.J.N.)	1967	Founded by Governor Raja Uda as a reward for exceptional service by the people of Penang.
Stars and Medals
Ribbon	Name (English/Malay)	Ranks / Letters	Instituted	Awarded to/for
	Distinguished Service Star; Bintang Cemerlang Negeri	B.C.N.	1996	Instituted by Governor Hamdan as a reward for long service and good conduct.
	Conspicuous Gallantry Medal; Pingat Gagah Perwira	P.G.P.	1959	Instituted by Governor Raja Uda as a reward for extreme bravery during wartime.
	Distinguished Conduct Medal; Pingat Kelakuan Terpuji	P.K.T.	1959	Instituted by Governor Raja Uda as a reward for contributions and good conduct.
	Meritorious Service Medal; Pingat Jasa Kebaktian	P.J.K.	1959	Instituted by Governor Raja Uda as a reward for civil servants.
	Community Service Medal; Pingat Jasa Masyarakat	P.J.M.	1969	Instituted by Governor Syed Sheh Hassan Barakbah as a reward for citizens and civil servants of the state government organs.
	Loyal Service Medal; Pingat Bakti Setia	P.B.S.	1963	Instituted by Governor Raja Uda as a reward for loyal service to the government and people of the state.

==== Sabah ====
The orders, decorations, and medals given by Yang di-Pertua Negeri of Sabah are:

Orders
Ribbon	Name (English/Malay)	Ranks / Letters	Instituted	Awarded to/for
	Order of Kinabalu; Darjah Yang Amat Mulia Kinabalu	Grand Commander (S.P.D.K.)	9 October 1963	Founded by Governor Mustapha as a reward for outstanding services for Sabah
	Order of Kinabalu; Darjah Yang Amat Mulia Kinabalu	Commander (P.G.D.K.)	9 October 1963	Founded by Governor Mustapha as a reward for outstanding services for Sabah
	Order of Kinabalu; Darjah Yang Amat Mulia Kinabalu	Companion (A.S.D.K.)	9 October 1963	Founded by Governor Mustapha as a reward for outstanding services for Sabah
	Order of Kinabalu; Darjah Yang Amat Mulia Kinabalu	Member (A.D.K.)	9 October 1963	Founded by Governor Mustapha as a reward for outstanding services for Sabah
	Order of Kinabalu; Darjah Yang Amat Mulia Kinabalu	Grand Star (B.S.K.)	9 October 1963	Founded by Governor Mustapha as a reward for outstanding services for Sabah
	Order of Kinabalu; Darjah Yang Amat Mulia Kinabalu	Star (B.K.)	9 October 1963	Founded by Governor Mustapha as a reward for outstanding services for Sabah
	Order of Kinabalu; Darjah Yang Amat Mulia Kinabalu	Certificate of Honour (S.K.)	9 October 1963	Founded by Governor Mustapha as a reward for outstanding services for Sabah
Stars and Medals
Ribbon	Name (English/Malay)	Ranks / Letters	Instituted	Awarded to/for
	"Let Sabah Prosper in Malaysia" 50th Anniversary Medal; Pingat Peringatan 50 Tahun Sabah Maju Jaya Dalam Malaysia	Gold medal	16 September 2013	Instituted by Governor Juhar Mahiruddin as a commemorate the 50 years of union with Malaysia.
	"Let Sabah Prosper in Malaysia" 50th Anniversary Medal; Pingat Peringatan 50 Tahun Sabah Maju Jaya Dalam Malaysia	Silver medal	16 September 2013	Instituted by Governor Juhar Mahiruddin as a commemorate the 50 years of union with Malaysia.

==== Sarawak ====
The orders, decorations, and medals given by Yang di-Pertua Negeri of Sarawak are:

Orders
Ribbon	Name (English/Malay)	Ranks / Letters	Instituted	Awarded to/for
	Most Exalted Order of the Star of Sarawak; Darjah Utama Yang Amat Mulia Bintang Sarawak	Knight Grand Commander (S.B.S.)	6 March 2003	Founded by Governor Abang Openg as a reward for exceptional service by the people of Sarawak
	Most Exalted Order of the Star of Sarawak; Darjah Utama Yang Amat Mulia Bintang Sarawak	Knight Commander (P.N.B.S.)	10 July 1964	Founded by Governor Abang Openg as a reward for exceptional service by the people of Sarawak
	Most Exalted Order of the Star of Sarawak; Darjah Utama Yang Amat Mulia Bintang Sarawak	Commander (P.S.B.S.)	6 March 2003	Founded by Governor Abang Openg as a reward for exceptional service by the people of Sarawak
	Most Exalted Order of the Star of Sarawak; Darjah Utama Yang Amat Mulia Bintang Sarawak	Companion (J.B.S.)	4 May 1970	Founded by Governor Abang Openg as a reward for exceptional service by the people of Sarawak
	Most Exalted Order of the Star of Sarawak; Darjah Utama Yang Amat Mulia Bintang Sarawak	Officer (P.B.S.)	10 July 1964	Founded by Governor Abang Openg as a reward for exceptional service by the people of Sarawak
	Most Exalted Order of the Star of Sarawak; Darjah Utama Yang Amat Mulia Bintang Sarawak	Member (A.B.S.)	10 July 1964	Founded by Governor Abang Openg as a reward for exceptional service by the people of Sarawak
	Most Exalted Order of the Star of Sarawak; Darjah Utama Yang Amat Mulia Bintang Sarawak	Herald (B.B.S.)	4 May 1970	Founded by Governor Abang Openg as a reward for exceptional service by the people of Sarawak
	Order of the Star of Hornbill Sarawak; Darjah Yang Amat Mulia Bintang Kenyalang Sarawak	Knight Grand Commander (D.P.)	26 June 1973	Founded by Governor Tuanku Bujang as a reward for significant contributions.
	Order of the Star of Hornbill Sarawak; Darjah Yang Amat Mulia Bintang Kenyalang Sarawak	Knight Commander (D.A.)	26 June 1973	Founded by Governor Tuanku Bujang as a reward for significant contributions.
	Order of the Star of Hornbill Sarawak; Darjah Yang Amat Mulia Bintang Kenyalang Sarawak	Commander (P.G.B.K.)	1 September 1988	Founded by Governor Tuanku Bujang as a reward for significant contributions.
	Order of the Star of Hornbill Sarawak; Darjah Yang Amat Mulia Bintang Kenyalang Sarawak	Companion (J.B.K.)	1 September 1988	Founded by Governor Tuanku Bujang as a reward for significant contributions.
	Order of the Star of Hornbill Sarawak; Darjah Yang Amat Mulia Bintang Kenyalang Sarawak	Officer (P.B.K.)	1 September 1988	Founded by Governor Tuanku Bujang as a reward for significant contributions.
	Order of the Star of Hornbill Sarawak; Darjah Yang Amat Mulia Bintang Kenyalang Sarawak	Member (A.B.K.)	1 September 1988	Founded by Governor Tuanku Bujang as a reward for significant contributions.
	Order of Meritorious Service to Sarawak; Darjah Jasa Bakti Sarawak	D.J.B.S.	4 September 1997	Founded by Governor Ahmad Zaidi Adruce as a reward for exemplary service to the State
	Civil Administration Medal; Pingat Pentadbiran Awam	Companion (J.P.C.)	Unknown	Founded by Governor Tuanku Bujang as a reward for exceptional service by Civil Servants.
	Civil Administration Medal; Pingat Pentadbiran Awam	Gold (P.P.C.)	26 June 1973	Founded by Governor Tuanku Bujang as a reward for exceptional service by Civil Servants.
	Civil Administration Medal; Pingat Pentadbiran Awam	Silver (P.P.B.)	26 June 1973	Founded by Governor Tuanku Bujang as a reward for exceptional service by Civil Servants.
	Civil Administration Medal; Pingat Pentadbiran Awam	Bronze (P.P.T.)	26 June 1973	Founded by Governor Tuanku Bujang as a reward for exceptional service by Civil Servants.
Stars and Medals
Ribbon	Name (English/Malay)	Ranks / Letters	Instituted	Awarded to/for
	Gallantry Service Medal; Pingat Jasa Keberanian	Gold medal	1993	Instituted by Governor Ahmad Zaidi Adruce as a reward for extreme bravery during wartime.
	Gallantry Service Medal; Pingat Jasa Keberanian	Silver medal	1993	Instituted by Governor Ahmad Zaidi Adruce as a reward for extreme bravery during wartime.
	Gallantry Service Medal; Pingat Jasa Keberanian	Bronze medal	1993	Instituted by Governor Ahmad Zaidi Adruce as a reward for extreme bravery during wartime.
	Sarawak Independence Diamond Jubilee Medal; Pingat Peringatan Jubli Intan Sarawak Merdeka	Gold medal	22 July 2023	Instituted by Governor Abdul Taib Mahmud as commemorate 60th anniversary of independence of Sarawak.
	Sarawak Independence Diamond Jubilee Medal; Pingat Peringatan Jubli Intan Sarawak Merdeka	Silver medal	22 July 2023	Instituted by Governor Abdul Taib Mahmud as commemorate 60th anniversary of independence of Sarawak.
	Sarawak Independence Diamond Jubilee Medal; Pingat Peringatan Jubli Intan Sarawak Merdeka	Bronze medal	22 July 2023	Instituted by Governor Abdul Taib Mahmud as commemorate 60th anniversary of independence of Sarawak.

=== Royal States ===
==== Johor ====
The orders, decorations, and medals given by the Sultan of Johor are:

Orders
Ribbon	Name (English/Malay)	Ranks / Letters	Instituted	Awarded to/for
	The Most Esteemed Royal Family Order of Johor; Darjah Kerabat Johor Yang Amat Dihormati	First Class or Pangkat Yang Pertama (D.K. I)	31 July 1886	Founded by Sultan Abu Bakar to reward meritorious contributions.
	The Most Esteemed Royal Family Order of Johor; Darjah Kerabat Johor Yang Amat Dihormati	Second Class or Pangkat Yang Kedua (D.K. II)	31 July 1886	Founded by Sultan Abu Bakar to reward meritorious contributions.
	The Most Honourable Order of the Crown of Johor; Darjah Mahkota Johor Yang Amat Mulia	Knight Grand Commander or Dato’ (S.P.M.J.)	31 July 1886	Founded by Sultan Abu Bakar as a reward for showing loyalty and meticulous service.
	The Most Honourable Order of the Crown of Johor; Darjah Mahkota Johor Yang Amat Mulia	Knight Commander or Dato’ (D.P.M.J.)	31 July 1886	Founded by Sultan Abu Bakar as a reward for showing loyalty and meticulous service.
	The Most Honourable Order of the Crown of Johor; Darjah Mahkota Johor Yang Amat Mulia	Companion or Setia (S.M.J.)	31 July 1886	Founded by Sultan Abu Bakar as a reward for showing loyalty and meticulous service.
	The Most Blessed Order of Loyalty of Sultan Ismail of Johor; Darjah Setia Sultan Ismail Johor Yang Amat Diberkati	Knight Grand Companion or Dato’ Sri Setia (S.S.I.J.)	28 October 1975	Founded by Sultan Ismail as a reward for contributions during his reign.
	The Most Blessed Order of Loyalty of Sultan Ismail of Johor; Darjah Setia Sultan Ismail Johor Yang Amat Diberkati	Knight Companion or Dato’ Setia (D.S.I.J.)	28 October 1975	Founded by Sultan Ismail as a reward for contributions during his reign.
	The Most Exalted Order of the Sultan Ibrahim Johor; Darjah Mulia Sultan Ibrahim Johor Yang Amat Disanjungi	Grand Knight or Dato’ Sri Mulia (S.M.I.J.)	30 March 2015	Founded by Sultan Ibrahim Ismail to reward meritorious and invaluable contributions during his reign.
	The Most Exalted Order of the Sultan Ibrahim Johor; Darjah Mulia Sultan Ibrahim Johor Yang Amat Disanjungi	Knight or Dato’ Mulia (D.M.I.J.)	30 March 2015	Founded by Sultan Ibrahim Ismail to reward meritorious and invaluable contributions during his reign.
	The Most Exalted Order of the Sultan Ibrahim Johor; Darjah Mulia Sultan Ibrahim Johor Yang Amat Disanjungi	Companion or Setia Mulia (S.I.J.)	30 March 2015	Founded by Sultan Ibrahim Ismail to reward meritorious and invaluable contributions during his reign.
Stars and Medals
Ribbon	Name (English/Malay)	Ranks / Letters	Instituted	Awarded to/for
	Iron Medal for Valour and Meritorious Conduct; Pingat Besi Kerana Keberanian dan Jasa	First Class or Pangkat Pertama (P.B. I)	1894	Instituted by Sultan Abu Bakar in 1894 and reformed by Sultan Ibrahim on 17 September 1958. As a reward for acts of supreme valour.
	Iron Medal for Valour and Meritorious Conduct; Pingat Besi Kerana Keberanian dan Jasa	Second Class or Pangkat Kedua (P.B. II)	1894	Instituted by Sultan Abu Bakar in 1894 and reformed by Sultan Ibrahim on 17 September 1958. As a reward for acts of bravery and life-saving.
	Medal for Long and Meritorious Service; Pingat Jasa dan Lama dalam Perkhidmatan	Silver Medal (P.J.P.)	17 September 1923	Instituted by Sultan Abu Bakar on 31 July 1886 and reformed by Sultan Ibrahim on 17 September 1923. Then as a reward for the members of the Johor Military and Volunteer Forces and marines, today awarded not only to the Royal Johor Military Forces but also to Malaysian Armed Forces personnel for service in the state.
	Medal for Long Service and Good Conduct; Pingat Kerana Lama dan Baik Dalam Pekerjaan	Silver Medal (P.L.P.)	31 July 1886	Instituted by Sultan Abu Bakar on 31 July 1886 and reformed by Sultan Ibrahim on 17 September 1923. As a reward for services rendered by the Royal Malaysia Police and federal, state and local civil service.
	Remembrance of Service Medal "Pingat Jasa Dikenang"	Silver Medal	4 October 2020	Instituted by Sultan Ibrahim Ismail as a reward for COVID-19 frontliners actively involved in the fight against the COVID-19 pandemic in the Johor state.
	Sultan Abu Bakar Medal; Pingat Abu Bakar Sultan	First Class in Gold (P.A.B.S.)	31 July 1886	Instituted by Sultan Abu Bakar to commemorate his Coronation on 31 July 1886.
	Sultan Ibrahim Medal; Pingat Ibrahim Sultan	First Class in Gold or Pangkat Pertama Emas (P.I.S.)	2 November 1895	Instituted by Sultan Ibrahim to commemorate his Coronation on 2 November 1895. Converted to a medal of merit on 17 September 1925 in celebration with his 30th anniversary on the throne, replacing the Sultan Abu Bakar Medal. Reserved for members of the Royal Family and elder statesmen.
	Sultan Ibrahim Medal; Pingat Ibrahim Sultan	Second Class in Silver or Pangkat Kedua Perak (P.I.S. II)	2 November 1895	Instituted by Sultan Ibrahim to commemorate his Coronation on 2 November 1895. Converted to a medal of merit on 17 September 1925 in celebration with his 30th anniversary on the throne, replacing the Sultan Abu Bakar Medal. Conferred in recognition of 20 years government service with loyalty, integrity and excellence by officers, staff and the public.
	Sultan Ibrahim Medal; Pingat Ibrahim Sultan	Third Class in Bronze or Pangkat Ketiga Gangsa - no post nominals permitted	2 November 1895	Instituted by Sultan Ibrahim to commemorate his Coronation on 2 November 1895. Converted to a medal of merit on 17 September 1925 in celebration with his 30th anniversary on the throne, replacing the Sultan Abu Bakar Medal. Conferred in recognition of 17 years government service with loyalty, integrity and excellence support staff.
	Star of Sultan Ismail; Bintang Sultan Ismail	First Class in Gold or Pangkat Pertama Emas (B.S.I.)	28 October 1977	Instituted by Sultan Ismail for contributions during his reign. Effectively function as the third and fourth classes of the Order of Loyalty of Sultan Ismail of Johor.
	Star of Sultan Ismail; Bintang Sultan Ismail	Second Class in Silver or Pangkat Kedua Perak (B.S.I. II)	28 October 1977	Instituted by Sultan Ismail for contributions during his reign. Effectively function as the third and fourth classes of the Order of Loyalty of Sultan Ismail of Johor.
	Sultan Ibrahim of Johor Medal; Pingat Sultan Ibrahim Johor	First Class in Gold or Pangkat Pertama Emas (P.S.I. I)	30 March 2015	Instituted by Sultan Ibrahim Ismail to commemorate his Coronation on 30 March 2015.
	Sultan Ibrahim of Johor Medal; Pingat Sultan Ibrahim Johor	Second Class in Silver or Pangkat Kedua Perak (P.S.I. II)	30 March 2015	Instituted by Sultan Ibrahim Ismail to commemorate his Coronation on 30 March 2015.
	Sultan Ibrahim of Johor Medal; Pingat Sultan Ibrahim Johor	Third Class in Bronze or Pangkat Ketiga Gangsa (P.S.I. III)	30 March 2015	Instituted by Sultan Ibrahim Ismail to commemorate his Coronation on 30 March 2015.
	Sultan Ibrahim Wedding Medal; Pingat Perkahwinan Sultan Ibrahim	First Class in Gold or Pangkat Pertama Emas	8 May 1932	Instituted by Sultan Ibrahim to commemorate his marriage to Sultanah Helen Ibrahim on 15 October 1930 and her Coronation as Sultanah on 18 November 1931.
	Sultan Ibrahim Wedding Medal; Pingat Perkahwinan Sultan Ibrahim	Second Class in Silver or Pangkat Kedua Perak	8 May 1932	Instituted by Sultan Ibrahim to commemorate his marriage to Sultanah Helen Ibrahim on 15 October 1930 and her Coronation as Sultanah on 18 November 1931.
	Sultan Ibrahim Wedding Medal; Pingat Perkahwinan Sultan Ibrahim	Third Class in Bronze or Pangkat Ketiga Gangsa	8 May 1932	Instituted by Sultan Ibrahim to commemorate his marriage to Sultanah Helen Ibrahim on 15 October 1930 and her Coronation as Sultanah on 18 November 1931.
	Sultan Ibrahim Diamond Jubilee Medal; Pingat Jubli Intan Sultan Ibrahim	First Class in Gold or Pangkat Pertama Emas	1955	Instituted by Sultan Ibrahim to commemorate his Diamond Jubilee in 1955.
	Sultan Ibrahim Diamond Jubilee Medal; Pingat Jubli Intan Sultan Ibrahim	Second Class in Silver or Pangkat Kedua Perak	1955	Instituted by Sultan Ibrahim to commemorate his Diamond Jubilee in 1955.
	Sultan Ibrahim Diamond Jubilee Medal; Pingat Jubli Intan Sultan Ibrahim	Third Class in Bronze or Pangkat Ketiga Gangsa	1955	Instituted by Sultan Ibrahim to commemorate his Diamond Jubilee in 1955.
	Sultan Ibrahim Memorial Medal; Pingat Memorial Sultan Ibrahim	Silver	8 May 1959	Instituted by Sultan Ismail to commemorate the life of his father, Sultan Ibrahim on 8 May 1959.
	Sultan Ismail Coronation Medal; Pingat Kemahkotaan Sultan Ismail	First Class in Gold or Pangkat Pertama Emas	10 February 1960	Instituted by Sultan Ismail to commemorate his Coronation on 10 February 1960.
	Sultan Ismail Coronation Medal; Pingat Kemahkotaan Sultan Ismail	Second Class in Silver or Pangkat Kedua Perak	10 February 1960	Instituted by Sultan Ismail to commemorate his Coronation on 10 February 1960.
	Sultan Ismail Coronation Medal; Pingat Kemahkotaan Sultan Ismail	Third Class in Bronze or Pangkat Ketiga Gangsa	10 February 1960	Instituted by Sultan Ismail to commemorate his Coronation on 10 February 1960.
	Sultan Iskandar Coronation Medal; Pingat Kemahkotaan Sultan Iskandar	First Class in Gold or Pangkat Pertama Emas	11 May 1981	Instituted by Sultan Iskandar to commemorate his Coronation on 11 May 1981.
	Sultan Iskandar Coronation Medal; Pingat Kemahkotaan Sultan Iskandar	Second Class in Silver or Pangkat Kedua Perak	11 May 1981	Instituted by Sultan Iskandar to commemorate his Coronation on 11 May 1981.
	Sultan Iskandar Coronation Medal; Pingat Kemahkotaan Sultan Iskandar	Third Class in Bronze or Pangkat Ketiga Gangsa	11 May 1981	Instituted by Sultan Iskandar to commemorate his Coronation on 11 May 1981.
	Sultan Ibrahim Ismail Coronation Medal; Pingat Kemahkotaan Sultan Ibrahim Ismail Johor	First Class in Gold or Pangkat Pertama Emas	23 March 2015	Instituted by Sultan Ibrahim to commemorate his Coronation on 23 March 2015.
	Sultan Ibrahim Ismail Coronation Medal; Pingat Kemahkotaan Sultan Ibrahim Ismail Johor	Second Class in Silver or Pangkat Kedua Perak	23 March 2015	Instituted by Sultan Ibrahim to commemorate his Coronation on 23 March 2015.
	Sultan Ibrahim Ismail Coronation Medal; Pingat Kemahkotaan Sultan Ibrahim Ismail Johor	Third Class in Bronze or Pangkat Ketiga Gangsa	23 March 2015	Instituted by Sultan Ibrahim to commemorate his Coronation on 23 March 2015.
	Remembrance of Service Medal; Pingat Jasa Dikenang	Silver medal	4 October 2020	Instituted by Sultan Ibrahim to appreciate the sacrifices of frontline workers in the state who are continuously working hard to combat the spread of the COVID-19 pandemic.

==== Kedah ====
The orders, decorations, and medals given by the Sultan of Kedah are:

Orders & Major Stars
Ribbon	Name (English/Malay)	Ranks / Letters	Instituted	Awarded to/for
	State of Kedah Star of Valour; Bintang Keberanian Negeri Kedah	Bronze Star (B.K.K.)	30 October 1952	Founded by Sultan Badlishah as a reward for acts of supreme valour performed by the military or civilians in circumstances of extreme danger during peacetime or war.
	The Most Illustrious Royal Family Order of Kedah; Darjah Kerabat Yang Amat Mulia Kedah	Member or Darjah Kerabat (D.K.)	21 February 1964	Founded by Sultan Abdul Halim Mu'adzam Shah.
	The Most Illustrious Halimi Family Order of Kedah; Darjah Kerabat Halimi Yang Amat Mulia Kedah	Member or Darjah Kerabat Halimi (D.K.H.)	January 1973	Founded by Sultan Abdul Halim Mu'adzam Shah.
	The Most Illustrious Sallehuddin Family Order of Kedah; Darjah Kerabat Sallehuddin Yang Amat Mulia Kedah	Member or Darjah Kerabat Sallehuddin (D.K.S.)	19 June 2022	Founded by Al-Aminul Karim Sultan Sallehuddin.
	The Kedah Supreme Order of Merit; Darjah Utama Untuk Jasa Kedah	D.U.K. (K.O.M.)	17 November 1953 (or 30 October 1952)	Founded by Sultan Badlishah. Limited to three living recipients.
	The Most Esteemed Supreme Order of Sri Mahawangsa; Darjah Utama Sri Mahawangsa Yang Amat Dihormati	Member or Dato’ Sri Utama (D.M.K.)	2005	Founded by Sultan Abdul Halim Mu'adzam Shah.
	State of Kedah Star of Gallantry; Bintang Perkasa Negeri Kedah	Silver star (B.P.K.)	30 October 1952	Founded by Sultan Badlishah as a reward for conspicuous acts of gallantry by the military, police or civilians, but of a standard less than the Star of Valour.
	The Most Esteemed Order of Loyalty to Sultan Sallehuddin of Kedah; Darjah Kebesaran Seri Setia Sultan Sallehuddin Kedah Yang Amat Dihormati	Knight Grand Companion or Dato' Seri Diraja (S.S.S.K.)	2018	Founded by Al-Aminul Karim Sultan Sallehuddin as a reward for contributions to the Community, the State and the Country.
	The Most Esteemed Order of Loyalty to Sultan Sallehuddin of Kedah; Darjah Kebesaran Seri Setia Sultan Sallehuddin Kedah Yang Amat Dihormati	Knight Commander or Dato' Paduka (D.P.S.S.)	2018	Founded by Al-Aminul Karim Sultan Sallehuddin as a reward for contributions to the Community, the State and the Country.
	The Most Esteemed Order of Loyalty to Sultan Sallehuddin of Kedah; Darjah Kebesaran Seri Setia Sultan Sallehuddin Kedah Yang Amat Dihormati	Knight Companion or Dato' (D.S.S.S.)	2018	Founded by Al-Aminul Karim Sultan Sallehuddin as a reward for contributions to the Community, the State and the Country.
	The Most Esteemed Order of Loyalty to Sultan Sallehuddin of Kedah; Darjah Kebesaran Seri Setia Sultan Sallehuddin Kedah Yang Amat Dihormati	Companion or Setia (S.S.S.)	2018	Founded by Al-Aminul Karim Sultan Sallehuddin as a reward for contributions to the Community, the State and the Country.
	The Most Esteemed Order of Loyalty to Sultan Sallehuddin of Kedah; Darjah Kebesaran Seri Setia Sultan Sallehuddin Kedah Yang Amat Dihormati	Star or Bintang (B.S.S.)	2018	Founded by Al-Aminul Karim Sultan Sallehuddin as a reward for contributions to the Community, the State and the Country.
	The Illustrious Order of Loyalty to Sultan Abdul Halim Mu'adzam Shah; Darjah Yang Mulia Sri Setia Sultan Abdul Halim Mu'adzam Shah	Grand Commander or Dato' Seri Diraja (S.H.M.S.)	2008	Founded by Sultan Abdul Halim Mu'adzam Shah.
	The Illustrious Order of Loyalty to Sultan Abdul Halim Mu'adzam Shah; Darjah Yang Mulia Sri Setia Sultan Abdul Halim Mu'adzam Shah	Knight Commander or Dato' Paduka (D.H.M.S.)	15 July 1983	Founded by Sultan Abdul Halim Mu'adzam Shah.
	The Illustrious Order of Loyalty to Sultan Abdul Halim Mu'adzam Shah; Darjah Yang Mulia Sri Setia Sultan Abdul Halim Mu'adzam Shah	Companion or Setia (S.M.S.)	15 July 1983	Founded by Sultan Abdul Halim Mu'adzam Shah.
	The Illustrious Order of Loyalty to Sultan Abdul Halim Mu'adzam Shah; Darjah Yang Mulia Sri Setia Sultan Abdul Halim Mu'adzam Shah	Star or Bintang (B.M.S.)	15 July 1983	Founded by Sultan Abdul Halim Mu'adzam Shah.
	The Glorious Order of the Crown of Kedah; Darjah Kebesaran Gemilang Sri Mahkota Kedah	Knight Grand Commander or Dato’ Seri Wira (S.G.M.K.)	2017	Founded by Al-Aminul Karim Sultan Sallehuddin.
	The Glorious Order of the Crown of Kedah; Darjah Kebesaran Gemilang Sri Mahkota Kedah	Knight Commander or Dato’ Wira (D.G.M.K.)	January 2001	Founded by Sultan Abdul Halim Mu'adzam Shah.
	The Glorious Order of the Crown of Kedah; Darjah Kebesaran Gemilang Sri Mahkota Kedah	Companion or Setia (G.M.K.)	January 2001	Founded by Sultan Abdul Halim Mu'adzam Shah.
	The Glorious Order of the Crown of Kedah; Darjah Kebesaran Gemilang Sri Mahkota Kedah	Member or Ahli (A.G.K.)	January 2001	Founded by Sultan Abdul Halim Mu'adzam Shah.
	The Most Illustrious Order of the Crown of Kedah; Darjah Yang Maha Mulia Sri Mahkota Kedah	Knight Grand Commander or Dato’ Seri (S.P.M.K.)	21 February 1964	Founded by Sultan Abdul Halim Mu'adzam Shah.
	The Most Illustrious Order of the Crown of Kedah; Darjah Yang Maha Mulia Sri Mahkota Kedah	Knight Commander or Dato’ (D.P.M.K.)	21 February 1964	Founded by Sultan Abdul Halim Mu'adzam Shah.
	The Most Illustrious Order of the Crown of Kedah; Darjah Yang Maha Mulia Sri Mahkota Kedah	Companion or Setia (S.M.K.)	21 February 1964	Founded by Sultan Abdul Halim Mu'adzam Shah.
	The Most Illustrious Order of the Crown of Kedah; Darjah Yang Maha Mulia Sri Mahkota Kedah	Member or Ahli (A.M.K.)	21 February 1964	Founded by Sultan Abdul Halim Mu'adzam Shah.
	The Illustrious Order of Loyalty to the Royal House of Kedah; Darjah Yang Mulia Setia Diraja	Knight Grand Companion or Dato’ Seri (S.S.D.K.)	21 September 1973	Founded by Sultan Abdul Halim Mu'adzam Shah.
	The Illustrious Order of Loyalty to the Royal House of Kedah; Darjah Yang Mulia Setia Diraja	Knight Companion or Dato’ (D.S.D.K.)	21 September 1973	Founded by Sultan Abdul Halim Mu'adzam Shah.
	The Illustrious Order of Loyalty to the Royal House of Kedah; Darjah Yang Mulia Setia Diraja	Companion or Setia (S.D.K.)	21 September 1973	Founded by Sultan Abdul Halim Mu'adzam Shah.
	The Glorious Order of the Loyal Warrior of Kedah; Darjah Kebesaran Setia Pahlawan Kedah	Knight Grand Commander or Dato' Seri Pahlawan (S.S.P.K.)	30 June 2024	Founded by Al-Aminul Karim Sultan Sallehuddin as a reward for uniformed service personnel for their contributions to the Community, the State and the Country.
	The Glorious Order of the Loyal Warrior of Kedah; Darjah Kebesaran Setia Pahlawan Kedah	Knight Commander or Dato' Pahlawan (D.S.P.K.)	1 November 2021	Founded by Al-Aminul Karim Sultan Sallehuddin as a reward for uniformed service personnel for their contributions to the Community, the State and the Country.
	The Glorious Order of the Loyal Warrior of Kedah; Darjah Kebesaran Setia Pahlawan Kedah	Commander or Dato' (D.D.S.P.)	1 November 2021	Founded by Al-Aminul Karim Sultan Sallehuddin as a reward for uniformed service personnel for their contributions to the Community, the State and the Country.
	The Glorious Order of the Loyal Warrior of Kedah; Darjah Kebesaran Setia Pahlawan Kedah	Member or Ahli (A.S.P.)	19 June 2023	Founded by Al-Aminul Karim Sultan Sallehuddin as a reward for uniformed service personnel for their contributions to the Community, the State and the Country.
Stars and Medals
Ribbon	Name (English/Malay)	Ranks / Letters	Instituted	Awarded to/for
	State of Kedah Gallantry Medal; Pingat Untuk Perkasa Negeri Kedah	Silver medal (P.P.K.)	30 October 1952	Instituted by Sultan Badlishah to reward acts of gallantry by non-commissioned officers and men of the security forces and police.
	Sultan Badlishah Medal for Faithful and Loyal Service; Pingat Sultan Badlishah Kerana Taat Setia	Silver medal (P.S.B.)	30 October 1952	Instituted by Sultan Badlishah to reward acts of loyalty, faithful service or gallantry directly connected to the person of the sultan.
	State of Kedah Distinguished Service Star; Bintang Perkhidmatan Yang Berbakti Negeri Kedah	Eight-pointed silver star (B.C.K.)	30 October 1952	Instituted by Sultan Badlishah to reward distinguished services to the state of Kedah. Although engraved "Kedah, For Distinguished Service" this decoration is also called Bintang Perkhidmatan Cemerlang or the Excellent Service Star.
	Justice of the Peace of Kedah; Jaksa Pendamai Kedah	J.P.	1953	Instituted by Sultan Badlishah
	State of Kedah Distinguished Service Medal; Pingat Perkhidmatan Yang Berbakti Negeri Kedah	Silver medal (P.C.K.)	30 October 1952	Instituted by Sultan Badlishah to reward distinguished services to the state of Kedah. Although engraved "Kedah, For Distinguished Service" this decoration is also called Pingat Perkhidmatan Cemerlang or the Excellent Service Medal.
	Public Service Star; Bintang Kebaktian Masyarakat	Silver star (B.K.M.)	21 January 1973	Instituted by Sultan Abdul Halim Mu'adzam Shah on as a reward for community service by those not in government employ.
	Meritorious Service Medal; Pingat Perkhidmatan Yang Jasa Kebaktian	Silver medal (P.J.K.)	30 October 1952	Instituted by Sultan Badlishah to reward services in the furtherance of the prosperity of the state or for substantial acts of public charity.
	Jerai Star for Vigour; Bintang Semangat Jerai	B.S.J.	?	Instituted by Sultan Abdul Hamid Halim Shah to reward those who have overcome adversity or disability with spirit, enthusiasm, vigour and a zest for life.
	Jerai Medal for Excellent Vigour; Pingat Cemerlang Semangat Jerai	Member or Ahli (A.S.J.)	?	Instituted by Sultan Abdul Hamid Halim Shah to reward achievement in a variety of areas of public endeavour, including sport, the arts and entertainment.
	Long Service and Good Conduct Star; Bintang Untuk Perkhidmatan Lama dan Kelakuan Baik	Six-pointed silver star (B.P.L.)	30 October 1952	Instituted by Sultan Badlishah to reward twenty-one years of continuous long service and good conduct in state service, at the level of officer or executive, or above.
(1931–1952)	Kedah Police Medal; Pingat Perkhidmatan Lama Polis	Silver medal (P.L.P.)	23 May 1931	Instituted by Sultan Abdul Hamid Halim Shah as a reward for long and distinguished services in the Kedah state police. Made obsolete in 1952.
(1931–1952)	Faithful Service Medal; Pingat Untuk Pekerjaan Taat Setia	Silver medal	23 May 1931	Instituted by Sultan Abdul Hamid Halim Shah on 23 May 1931 as a reward for long and faithful services to the Sultan and State of Kedah. Made obsolete in 1952, when living recipients were required to exchange their medals for the new Long Service and Good Conduct Star or Medal.
	Long Service and Good Conduct Medal; Pingat Untuk Perkhidmatan Lama dan Kelakuan Baik	Silver medal (P.P.L.)	30 October 1952	Instituted by Sultan Badlishah to reward twenty-one years of continuous long service and good conduct in state service, at the non-executive level or below.
	Installation Medal 1943; Pingat Pertabalan Negeri Kedah 1943	Silver-gilt medal	1943	Instituted by Sultan Badlishah to commemorate his installation as Sultan in 1943.
	Installation Medal 1943; Pingat Pertabalan Negeri Kedah 1943	Silver medal	1943	Instituted by Sultan Badlishah to commemorate his installation as Sultan in 1943.
	Installation Medal 1959; Pingat Pertabalan Negeri Kedah 1959	Silver-gilt medal	26 February 1959	Instituted by Sultan Abdul Halim Mu'adzam Shah to commemorate his installation as Sultan on 26 February 1959.
	Installation Medal 1959; Pingat Pertabalan Negeri Kedah 1959	Silver medal	26 February 1959	Instituted by Sultan Abdul Halim Mu'adzam Shah to commemorate his installation as Sultan on 26 February 1959.
	Silver Jubilee Remembrance Medal; Pingat Peringatan Jubli Perak	Silver medal (P.P.J.P.)	15 July 1983	Instituted by Sultan Abdul Halim Mu'adzam Shah to commemorate the twenty-fifth anniversary of his installation as Sultan on 15 July 1983.
	Golden Jubilee Remembrance Medal; Pingat Peringatan Jubli Mas	Silver medal (P.P.J.M.)	15 July 2008	Instituted by Sultan Abdul Halim Mu'adzam Shah to commemorate the fiftieth anniversary of his installation as Sultan on 15 July 2008.
	Installation Medal 2018; Pingat Pertabalan Negeri Kedah 2018	Silver medal	22 October 2018	Instituted by Al-Aminul Karim Sultan Sallehuddin to commemorate his installation as Sultan on 22 October 2018.

==== Kelantan ====
The orders, decorations, and medals given by the Sultan of Kelantan are:

Orders
Ribbon	Name (English/Malay)	Ranks / Letters	Instituted	Awarded to/for
	The Most Esteemed Royal Family Order of Kelantan (Star of Yunus); Darjah Kerabat Yang Amat Dihormati (Bintang Al-Yunusi)	D.K.	1916	Founded by Sultan Muhammad IV to reward meritorious contributions. Max. to 25 recipients at any one time and reserved for members of the royal families and state dignitaries.
	The Most Illustrious Order of the Crown of Kelantan (Star of Muhammad); Darjah Kebesaran Mahkota Kelantan Yang Amat Mulia (Bintang Al-Muhammadi)	Knight Grand Commander or Seri Paduka (S.P.M.K.)	1916	Founded by Sultan Muhammad IV as a reward for showing loyalty and meticulous service. Max. to 40 recipients.
	The Most Illustrious Order of the Crown of Kelantan (Star of Muhammad); Darjah Kebesaran Mahkota Kelantan Yang Amat Mulia (Bintang Al-Muhammadi)	Knight Commander or Dato Paduka (D.P.M.K.)	1916	Founded by Sultan Muhammad IV as a reward for showing loyalty and meticulous service. Max. to 60 recipients.
	The Most Illustrious Order of the Crown of Kelantan (Star of Muhammad); Darjah Kebesaran Mahkota Kelantan Yang Amat Mulia (Bintang Al-Muhammadi)	Commander or Paduka (P.M.K.)	1916	Founded by Sultan Muhammad IV as a reward for showing loyalty and meticulous service.
(1925–2006) (since 2006)	The Most Illustrious Order of the Life of the Crown of Kelantan (Star of Ismail); Darjah Kebesaran Jiwa Mahkota Kelantan Yang Amat Mulia (Bintang Al-Ismaili)	Knight Grand Commander or Seri Paduka (S.J.M.K.)	1925	Founded by Sultan Ismail as a reward for taking life-risking situations. Max. to 50 recipients.
(1925–2006) (since 2006)	The Most Illustrious Order of the Life of the Crown of Kelantan (Star of Ismail); Darjah Kebesaran Jiwa Mahkota Kelantan Yang Amat Mulia (Bintang Al-Ismaili)	Knight Commander or Dato Paduka (D.J.M.K.)	1925	Founded by Sultan Ismail as a reward for taking life-risking situations. Max. to 75 recipients.
(1925–2006) (since 2006)	The Most Illustrious Order of the Life of the Crown of Kelantan (Star of Ismail); Darjah Kebesaran Jiwa Mahkota Kelantan Yang Amat Mulia (Bintang Al-Ismaili)	Companion or Taulan (J.M.K.)	1925	Founded by Sultan Ismail as a reward for taking life-risking situations.
	The Most Valiant Order of the Noble Crown of Kelantan (Star of Yahya); Darjah Kebesaran Kshatria Mahkota Kelantan Yang Amat Perkasa (Bintang Al-Yahyawi)	Knight Grand Commander or Seri Paduka (S.P.K.K.)	1988	Founded by Sultan Ismail Petra as a reward for those who being loyal to the state. Max. to 40 recipients.
	The Most Valiant Order of the Noble Crown of Kelantan (Star of Yahya); Darjah Kebesaran Kshatria Mahkota Kelantan Yang Amat Perkasa (Bintang Al-Yahyawi)	Knight Commander or Dato Paduka (D.P.K.K.)	1988	Founded by Sultan Ismail Petra as a reward for those who being loyal to the state. Max. to 60 recipients.
	The Most Valiant Order of the Noble Crown of Kelantan (Star of Yahya); Darjah Kebesaran Kshatria Mahkota Kelantan Yang Amat Perkasa (Bintang Al-Yahyawi)	Commander or Paduka (P.K.K.)	1988	Founded by Sultan Ismail Petra as a reward for those who being loyal to the state.
	The Most Distinguished Order of Loyalty to the Crown of Kelantan (Star of Ibrahim); Darjah Kebesaran Setia Mahkota Kelantan Yang Amat Terbilang (Bintang Al-Ibrahimi)	Knight Grand Commander or Seri Paduka (S.P.S.K.)	10 December 1967	Founded by Sultan Yahya Petra to reward those who being loyal to the state. Max. to 50 recipients.
	The Most Distinguished Order of Loyalty to the Crown of Kelantan (Star of Ibrahim); Darjah Kebesaran Setia Mahkota Kelantan Yang Amat Terbilang (Bintang Al-Ibrahimi)	Knight Commander or Dato Paduka (D.P.S.K.)	10 December 1967	Founded by Sultan Yahya Petra to reward those who being loyal to the state. Max. to 75 recipients.
	The Most Distinguished Order of Loyalty to the Crown of Kelantan (Star of Ibrahim); Darjah Kebesaran Setia Mahkota Kelantan Yang Amat Terbilang (Bintang Al-Ibrahimi)	Commander or Paduka (P.S.K.)	10 December 1967	Founded by Sultan Yahya Petra to reward those who being loyal to the state.
	The Most Distinguished Order of Loyalty to the Crown of Kelantan (Star of Ibrahim); Darjah Kebesaran Setia Mahkota Kelantan Yang Amat Terbilang (Bintang Al-Ibrahimi)	Officer or Bentara (B.S.K.)	10 December 1967	Founded by Sultan Yahya Petra to reward those who being loyal to the state.
	The Most Distinguished Order of Loyalty to the Crown of Kelantan (Star of Ibrahim); Darjah Kebesaran Setia Mahkota Kelantan Yang Amat Terbilang (Bintang Al-Ibrahimi)	Member or Ahli (A.S.K.)	10 December 1967	Founded by Sultan Yahya Petra to reward those who being loyal to the state.
	The Most Loyal Order of the Services to the Crown of Kelantan (Star of Petra); Darjah Kebesaran Jasa Mahkota Kelantan (Bintang al-Petrawi)	Knight Grand Commander or Seri Paduka (S.P.J.K.)	15 May 2016	Founded by Sultan Muhammad V to reward outstanding services to the State and Royal Family
	The Most Loyal Order of the Services to the Crown of Kelantan (Star of Petra); Darjah Kebesaran Jasa Mahkota Kelantan (Bintang al-Petrawi)	Knight Commander or Dato Paduka (D.P.J.K.)	15 May 2016	Founded by Sultan Muhammad V to reward outstanding services to the State and Royal Family
	The Most Loyal Order of the Services to the Crown of Kelantan (Star of Petra); Darjah Kebesaran Jasa Mahkota Kelantan (Bintang al-Petrawi)	Commander or Paduka (P.J.K.)	15 May 2016	Founded by Sultan Muhammad V to reward outstanding services to the State and Royal Family
	The Most Loyal Order of the Services to the Crown of Kelantan (Star of Petra); Darjah Kebesaran Jasa Mahkota Kelantan (Bintang al-Petrawi)	Officer or Bentara (B.J.K.)	15 May 2016	Founded by Sultan Muhammad V to reward outstanding services to the State and Royal Family
	The Most Loyal Order of the Services to the Crown of Kelantan (Star of Petra); Darjah Kebesaran Jasa Mahkota Kelantan (Bintang al-Petrawi)	Member or Ahli (A.J.K.)	15 May 2016	Founded by Sultan Muhammad V to reward outstanding services to the State and Royal Family
	The Order of the Most Distinguished and Most Valiant Warrior; Darjah Pahlawan Yang Amat Gagah Perkasa Yang Amat Mulia	P.Y.G.P.	1919	Founded by Sultan Muhammad IV as a reward for individual acts of supreme gallantry and valour.
Stars and Medals
Ribbon	Name (English/Malay)	Ranks / Letters	Instituted	Awarded to/for
	Crown of Kelantan Decoration; Seri Mahkota Kelantan	S.M.K.	1916	Instituted by Sultan Muhammad IV as a reward for those whose civil servants do not qualify for the ordinary classes of the Order of the Crown of Kelantan. In reality this decoration functions as the fourth class of the Order of the Crown of Kelantan.
	Seri Kelantan Decoration; Seri Kelantan	S.K.	1916	Instituted by Sultan Muhammad IV as a reward for those whose civil servants do not qualify for the ordinary classes of the Order of the Crown of Kelantan. Originally a military decoration which now functions essentially as the fifth class of the Order of the Crown of Kelantan.
	Ahli Kelantan Decoration; Ahli Kelantan	A.K.	1925	Instituted by Sultan Ismail as a reward for those whose civil servants do not qualify for the ordinary classes of the Order of the Life of the Crown of Kelantan. In reality this decoration functions as the fourth class of the Order of the Life of the Crown of Kelantan.
	Meritorious Service Medal; Pingat Bakti	Silver medal (P.B.)	1925	Instituted by Sultan Ismail as a reward for general service and awarded principally to military officers.
	Medal of Loyalty to the Crown of Kelantan; Pingat Setia Mahkota Kelantan	P.S.	10 December 1967	Instituted by Sultan Yahya Petra as a medal of merit for civil servants.
	Loyal Service Medal; Pingat Taat	Silver medal (P.T.)	1925	Instituted by Sultan Ismail as a reward for long service awarded principally to military personnel.
	Good Conduct Medal; Pingat Perangai Baik	Silver medal (P.P.B.)	1939	Instituted by Sultan Ismail to reward long service and good conduct in government service.
	State Council Inauguration Commemorative Medal 1939; Pingat Peringatan Pembukaan Dewan Tinggi 1939	Silver medal (P.P.M.)	1939	Instituted by Sultan Ismail to commemorate the inauguration of the first Kelantan State Council in 1939.
	Sultan Ibrahim IV Coronation Medal; Pingat Kemahkotaan Sultan Ibrahim IV	Silver medal (P.P.I.)	25 October 1944	Instituted by Sultan Ibrahim IV to commemorate his Coronation on 25 October 1944.
	Sultan Yahya Petra Coronation Medal; Pingat Kemahkotaan Sultan Yahya Petra	Gold medal	17 July 1961	Instituted by Sultan Yahya Petra to commemorate his Coronation on 17 July 1961. Limited to rulers and royal families.
	Sultan Yahya Petra Coronation Medal; Pingat Kemahkotaan Sultan Yahya Petra	Silver medal	17 July 1961	Instituted by Sultan Yahya Petra to commemorate his Coronation on 17 July 1961. Awarded to ordinary recipients.
	Sultan Ismail Petra Coronation Medal; Pingat Kemahkotaan Sultan Ismail Petra	Gold medal	30 March 1980	Instituted by Sultan Ismail Petra to commemorate his Coronation on 30 March 1980. Limited for rulers and royal families.
	Sultan Ismail Petra Coronation Medal; Pingat Kemahkotaan Sultan Ismail Petra	Silver medal	30 March 1980	Instituted by Sultan Ismail Petra to commemorate his Coronation on 30 March 1980. Awarded to ordinary recipients.
	Silver Jubilee Medal; Pingat Jubli Perak	Gold medal (P.J.P.)	30 March 2004	Instituted by Sultan Ismail Petra to commemorate his Silver Jubilee on 30 March 2004. Limited for rulers and royal families.
	Silver Jubilee Medal; Pingat Jubli Perak	Silver medal (P.J.P.)	30 March 2004	Instituted by Sultan Ismail Petra to commemorate his Silver Jubilee on 30 March 2004. Awarded to ordinary recipients.
	Meritorious Service Medal; Pingat Kebaktian Perkhidmatan	P.K.P.	Unknown	as a reward for long service and good conduct.
	Sultan Muhammad V Proclamation Medal; Pingat Pemasyhuran Sultan Muhammad V	Gold medal	13 September 2010	Instituted by Sultan Muhammad V to commemorate his Proclamation on 13 September 2010. Limited for rulers and royal families.
	Sultan Muhammad V Proclamation Medal; Pingat Pemasyhuran Sultan Muhammad V	Silver medal	13 September 2010	Instituted by Sultan Muhammad V to commemorate his Proclamation on 13 September 2010. Awarded to ordinary recipients.

==== Negeri Sembilan ====
The orders, decorations, and medals given by the Yang di-Pertuan Besar of Negeri Sembilan are:

Orders
Ribbon	Name (English/Malay)	Ranks / Letters	Instituted	Awarded to/for
	The Most Illustrious Royal Family Order of Negeri Sembilan; Darjah Kerabat Negeri Sembilan Yang Amat Mulia	D.K.N.S.	24 May 1979	Founded by Tuanku Jaafar. Limited to heads of state and their consorts.
(1979–2010)	The Order of Negeri Sembilan; Darjah Negeri Sembilan	D.N.S.	24 May 1979	Founded by Tuanku Jaafar. Made obsolete in 2010.
	The Order of Negeri Sembilan; Darjah Negeri Sembilan	Paramount or Tertinggi (D.T.N.S.)	14 January 2010	Founded by Tuanku Muhriz. Limited to the rulers of the constituent negri.
	The Order of Negeri Sembilan; Darjah Negeri Sembilan	Illustrious or Mulia (D.M.N.S.)	14 January 2010	Founded by Tuanku Muhriz. Limited to the consorts of the rulers of the constituent negri.
	The Royal Family Order of Yamtuan Radin Sunnah; Darjah Kerabat Yamtuan Radin Sunnah	D.K.Y.R.	24 May 1979	Founded by Tuanku Jaafar to recognize legitimate members of the Royal Family descended from Yamtuan Radin Sunnah
(1979–2010); New insignia (since 2010)	The Most Esteemed Order of Loyalty to Negeri Sembilan; Darjah Setia Negeri Sembilan Yang Amat Dihormati	Principal Grand Knight or Dato’ Seri Utama - S.U.N.S. (previously Knight Grand Commander or Dato’ Seri Utama - S.P.N.S. )	24 May 1979	Founded by Tuanku Jaafar as a general order of merit to reward and recognise loyal service to the state in all fields of endeavour.
	The Most Esteemed Order of Loyalty to Negeri Sembilan; Darjah Setia Negeri Sembilan Yang Amat Dihormati	Knight Grand Companion or Dato' Seri - S.S.N.S.	2015	Founded by Tuanku Jaafar as a general order of merit to reward and recognise loyal service to the state in all fields of endeavour.
(1979–2010); New insignia (since 2010)	The Most Esteemed Order of Loyalty to Negeri Sembilan; Darjah Setia Negeri Sembilan Yang Amat Dihormati	Knight Commander or Dato’ - D.P.N.S. (previously Knight Companion or Dato’ - D.S.N.S. )	24 May 1979	Founded by Tuanku Jaafar as a general order of merit to reward and recognise loyal service to the state in all fields of endeavour.
(1979–2010); New insignia (since 2010)	The Most Esteemed Order of Loyalty to Negeri Sembilan; Darjah Setia Negeri Sembilan Yang Amat Dihormati	Companion (D.N.S.)	24 May 1979	Founded by Tuanku Jaafar as a general order of merit to reward and recognise loyal service to the state in all fields of endeavour.
(1979–2010); New insignia (since 2010)	The Most Esteemed Order of Loyalty to Negeri Sembilan; Darjah Setia Negeri Sembilan Yang Amat Dihormati	Member or Ahli (A.N.S.)	24 May 1979	Founded by Tuanku Jaafar as a general order of merit to reward and recognise loyal service to the state in all fields of endeavour.
	The Order of Loyalty to Tuanku Muhriz; Darjah Setia Tuanku Muhriz	Knight Grand Companion of the Order of Loyal Order to Tuanku Muhriz - Darjah Sri Setia Tuanku Muhriz Yang Amat Terbilang with the personal title of Dato’ Sri (S.S.T.M.)	14 January 2010	Founded by Tuanku Muhriz to supersede the Loyal Order of Tuanku Jaafar and to recognise and reward loyal and meritorious service to the reigning Yang di-Pertuan Besar.
	The Order of Loyalty to Tuanku Muhriz; Darjah Setia Tuanku Muhriz	Knight Companion of the Order of Loyal Order to Tuanku Muhriz - Darjah Setia Tuanku Muhriz Yang Amat Gemilang with the personal title of Dato’ (D.S.T.M.)	14 January 2010	Founded by Tuanku Muhriz to supersede the Loyal Order of Tuanku Jaafar and to recognise and reward loyal and meritorious service to the reigning Yang di-Pertuan Besar.
	The Order of Loyalty to Tuanku Muhriz; Darjah Setia Tuanku Muhriz	Companion (D.T.M.)	14 January 2010	Founded by Tuanku Muhriz to supersede the Loyal Order of Tuanku Jaafar and to recognise and reward loyal and meritorious service to the reigning Yang di-Pertuan Besar.
	The Order of Loyalty to Tuanku Muhriz; Darjah Setia Tuanku Muhriz	Officer or Setiawan (S.T.M.)	14 January 2010	Founded by Tuanku Muhriz to supersede the Loyal Order of Tuanku Jaafar and to recognise and reward loyal and meritorious service to the reigning Yang di-Pertuan Besar.
	The Order of Loyalty to Tuanku Muhriz; Darjah Setia Tuanku Muhriz	Herald or Pingat Bentara (B.T.M.)	14 January 2010	Founded by Tuanku Muhriz to supersede the Loyal Order of Tuanku Jaafar and to recognise and reward loyal and meritorious service to the reigning Yang di-Pertuan Besar.
	The Order of Loyal Service to Negeri Sembilan; Darjah Setia Bakti Negeri Sembilan	Knight or Dato’ (D.B.N.S.)	14 January 2010	Founded by Tuanku Muhriz to recognise and reward loyal service to the Yang di-Pertuan Besar and state of Negri Sembilan in the fields of politics, business or meritorious service by distinguished individuals.
(1984–2010)	The Most Blessed Grand Order of Tuanku Jaafar; Darjah Kebesaran Sri Tuanku Jaafar Yang Amat Terpuji	Knight Grand Commander or Dato’ Sri Paduka (S.P.T.J.)	18 July 1984	Founded by Tuanku Jaafar as a reward for loyal service to the YDP and to recognise meritorious service. Made obsolete on 14 January 2010.
(1984–2010)	The Most Blessed Grand Order of Tuanku Jaafar; Darjah Kebesaran Sri Tuanku Jaafar Yang Amat Terpuji	Knight Commander or Dato’ Paduka (D.P.T.J.)	18 July 1984	Founded by Tuanku Jaafar as a reward for loyal service to the YDP and to recognise meritorious service. Made obsolete on 14 January 2010.
	The Distinguished Conduct Order; Darjah Pekerti Terpilih	D.P.T.	14 January 2010	Founded by Tuanku Muhriz as a reward of merit for federal or state civil servants who have displayed distinguished conduct within their profession or occupation.
Stars and Medals
Ribbon	Name (English/Malay)	Ranks / Letters	Instituted	Awarded to/for
	Conspicuous Gallantry Medal; Pingat Keberanian Cemerlang	Silver medal (P.K.C.)	31 August 1950	Instituted by Tuanku Abdul Rahman to reward acts of conspicuous gallantry and heroism.
	Conspicuous Conduct Medal; Pingat Pekerti Cemerlang	Bronze medal (P.P.C.)	14 January 2010	Instituted by Tuanku Muhriz to reward acts of bravery.
	Distinguished Conduct Medal; Pingat Pekerti Terpilih	Bronze medal (P.P.T.)	31 August 1950	Instituted by Tuanku Abdul Rahman to reward acts of bravery.
	Medal for Outstanding Public Service; Pingat Khidmat Masyarakat Cemerlang	Bronze medal (P.M.C.)	24 May 1979	Instituted by Tuanku Jaafar to reward meritorious public service by those in public employ.
	Meritorious Service Medal; Pingat Jasa Kebaktian	Bronze medal (P.J.K.)	31 August 1950	Instituted by Tuanku Abdul Rahman to reward meritorious public service by those in public employ.
	Long Service Medal; Pingat Khidmat Lama	Bronze medal (P.K.L.)	11 January 1968	Instituted by Tuanku Jaafar to reward long service by state employees of not less than twenty-five years duration.
	Defence Medal; Pingat Pertahanan	Silver medal	1972	Instituted by Tuanku Jaafar as a service medal.
	Installation Medal 1961; Pingat Pertabalan 1961	Silver medal	17 April 1961	Instituted by Tuanku Munawir to commemorate his installation as Yang di-Pertuan Besar on 17 April 1961.
	Installation Medal 1968; Pingat Pertabalan 1968	Silver medal	8 April 1968	Instituted by Tuanku Jaafar to commemorate his installation as Yang di-Pertuan Besar on 8 April 1968.
	Silver Jubilee Medal; Pingat Jubli Perak	Silver medal	1992	Instituted by Tuanku Jaafar to commemorate the twenty-fifth anniversary of his installation as Yang di-Pertuan Besar in 1992.
	Installation Medal 2009; Pingat Pertabalan 2009	Silver medal	26 October 2009	Instituted by Tuanku Muhriz to commemorate his installation as Yang di-Pertuan Besar on 26 October 2009.

==== Pahang ====
The orders, decorations, and medals given by the Sultan of Pahang are:

Orders
Ribbon	Name (English/Malay)	Ranks / Letters	Instituted	Awarded to/for
	The Most Illustrious Royal Family Order of Pahang; Darjah Kerabat Yang Maha Mulia Utama Kerabat Diraja Pahang	Member or Ahli (D.K.P.)	24 October 1977	Founded by Sultan Ahmad Shah.
	The Most Esteemed Family Order of the Crown of Indra of Pahang; Darjah Kerabat Sri Indra Mahkota Pahang Yang Amat Dihormati	Member 1st class - D.K. I	25 May 1967	Founded by Sultan Abu Bakar.
	The Most Esteemed Family Order of the Crown of Indra of Pahang; Darjah Kerabat Sri Indra Mahkota Pahang Yang Amat Dihormati	Member 2nd class - D.K. II	25 May 1967	Founded by Sultan Abu Bakar.
	The Most Illustrious Order of Al-Sultan Abdullah of Pahang; Darjah Kebesaran Al-Sultan Abdullah Pahang Yang Amat Mulia	Knight Grand Companion or Dato' Sri Setia - S.A.A.S.	30 July 2024	Founded by Al-Sultan Abdullah
	The Most Illustrious Order of Al-Sultan Abdullah of Pahang; Darjah Kebesaran Al-Sultan Abdullah Pahang Yang Amat Mulia	Knight Companion or Dato' - D.S.A.S.	26 July 2025	Founded by Al-Sultan Abdullah
	The Most Illustrious Order of Al-Sultan Abdullah of Pahang; Darjah Kebesaran Al-Sultan Abdullah Pahang Yang Amat Mulia	Companion or Setia - S.A.S.	30 July 2024	Founded by Al-Sultan Abdullah
	The Grand Royal Order of Sultan Ahmad Shah of Pahang; Darjah Sri Diraja Sultan Ahmad Shah Pahang	Grand Royal Knight or Dato’ Sri Diraja - S.D.S.A.	23 October 2010	Founded by Sultan Ahmad Shah to commemorate of his eightieth birthday on 23 October 2010.
	The Most Illustrious Order of Sultan Ahmad Shah of Pahang; Darjah Kebesaran Sri Sultan Ahmad Shah Pahang Yang Amat Mulia	Knight Grand Companion or Dato’ Sri - S.S.A.P.	24 October 1977	Founded by Sultan Ahmad Shah.
	The Most Illustrious Order of Sultan Ahmad Shah of Pahang; Darjah Kebesaran Sri Sultan Ahmad Shah Pahang Yang Amat Mulia	Knight Companion or Dato’ (D.S.A.P.)	24 October 1977	Founded by Sultan Ahmad Shah.
	The Most Illustrious Order of Sultan Ahmad Shah of Pahang; Darjah Kebesaran Sri Sultan Ahmad Shah Pahang Yang Amat Mulia	Companion or Setia (S.A.P.)	24 October 1977	Founded by Sultan Ahmad Shah.
	The Most Illustrious Order of Sultan Ahmad Shah of Pahang; Darjah Kebesaran Sri Sultan Ahmad Shah Pahang Yang Amat Mulia	Member or Ahli (A.A.P.)	24 October 1977	Founded by Sultan Ahmad Shah.
	The Esteemed; Order of the Crown of Pahang; Darjah Kebesaran Mahkota Pahang Yang Dihormati	Knight Grand Companion or Dato’ Indera (S.I.M.P.)	27 December 1968	Founded by Sultan Abu Bakar.
	The Esteemed; Order of the Crown of Pahang; Darjah Kebesaran Mahkota Pahang Yang Dihormati	Knight Companion or Dato’ (D.I.M.P.)	27 December 1968	Founded by Sultan Abu Bakar.
	The Esteemed; Order of the Crown of Pahang; Darjah Kebesaran Mahkota Pahang Yang Dihormati	Companion or Setia (S.M.P.)	27 December 1968	Founded by Sultan Abu Bakar.
	The Esteemed; Order of the Crown of Pahang; Darjah Kebesaran Mahkota Pahang Yang Dihormati	Member or Ahli (A.M.P.)	27 December 1968	Founded by Sultan Abu Bakar.
Stars and Medals
Ribbon	Name (English/Malay)	Ranks / Letters	Instituted	Awarded to/for
	Conspicuous Gallantry Medal; Pingat Gagah Perwira	Silver medal (P.G.P.)	17 October 1951	Instituted by Sultan Abu Bakar to reward conspicuous acts of gallantry of the highest order.
	Distinguished Service Medal; Pingat Khidmat Cemerlang	Silver medal (P.K.C.)	20 October 1985	Instituted by Sultan Ahmad Shah as a reward for long and distinguished services to the state.
	Distinguished Conduct Medal; Pingat Kelakuan Terpuji	Bronze medal (P.K.T.)	17 October 1951	Instituted by Sultan Abu Bakar as a reward for distinguished conduct in the service of the state.
	Meritorious Service Medal; Pingat Jasa Kebaktian	Bronze medal (P.J.K.)	17 October 1951	Instituted by Sultan Abu Bakar as a reward for long and meritorious services to the state.
	Silver Jubilee Medal; Pingat Jubli Perak Pahang	Silver medal (P.J.P.)	29 May 1957	Instituted by Sultan Abu Bakar in commemoration the twenty-fifth anniversary of his installation as Sultan on 29 May 1957.
	Sultan Haji Ahmad Shah Installation Medal; Pingat Pertabalan Sultan Haji Ahmad Shah	Silver medal	8 May 1975	Instituted by Sultan Ahmad Shah to commemorate his installation as Sultan on 8 May 1975.
	Silver Jubilee Medal; Pingat Jubli Perak Pahang	Silver medal (P.J.P.)	1999	Instituted by Sultan Ahmad Shah to commemorate the twenty-fifth anniversary of his installation as Sultan in 1999.

==== Perak ====
The orders, decorations, and medals given by the Sultan of Perak are:

Orders
Ribbon	Name (English/Malay)	Ranks / Letters	Instituted	Awarded to/for
(1957–2001) (since 2001)	The Most Esteemed Royal Family Order of Perak; Darjah Kerabat Diraja Yang Amat Dihormati	D.K.	12 December 1957	Founded by Sultan Yusuf Izzuddin Shah. Conferred on members of the Perak and foreign Royal houses.
	The Most Esteemed Perak Family Order of Sultan Azlan Shah; Darjah Kerabat Sri Paduka Sultan Azlan Shah Perak Yang Amat Dihormati	Superior Class or Darjah Kerabat Sultan Azlan - D.K.S.A.	2000	Founded by Sultan Azlan Shah. Conferred on members of the Perak and foreign Royal Houses.
(2000–2011) (since 2011)	The Most Esteemed Perak Family Order of Sultan Azlan Shah; Darjah Kerabat Sri Paduka Sultan Azlan Shah Perak Yang Amat Dihormati	Ordinary Class or Datuk Sri Paduka Sultan Azlan - S.P.S.A.	2000	Founded by Sultan Azlan Shah. Conferred for distinguished services to the Sultan.
	The Most Esteemed Azlanii Royal Family Order; Darjah Yang Teramat Mulia Darjah Kerabat Azlanii	Member First Class - Darjah Kerabat Azlanii - D.K.A. I	2010	Founded by Sultan Azlan Shah.
	The Most Esteemed Azlanii Royal Family Order; Darjah Yang Teramat Mulia Darjah Kerabat Azlanii	Member Second Class - Darjah Kerabat Azlanii - D.K.A. II	2010	Founded by Sultan Azlan Shah.
	The Most Esteemed Azlanii Royal Family Order; Darjah Yang Teramat Mulia Darjah Kerabat Azlanii	Grand Knight - Darjah Dato' Seri Azlanii - D.S.A.	2009	Founded by Sultan Azlan Shah.
	The Most Esteemed Perak Family Order of Sultan Nazrin Shah; Darjah Kerabat Sri Paduka Sultan Nazrin Shah Perak Yang Amat Dihormati	Ordinary class or Dato' Seri DiRaja (S.P.S.N.)	2015	Founded by Sultan Nazrin Shah.
(1969–2000) (2001–2010) (since 2011)	The Most Illustrious Order of Cura Si Manja Kini (the Perak Sword of State); Darjah Kebesaran Negeri Perak Yang Amat Mulia Cura Si Manja Kini	Knight Grand Commander or Dato’ Seri (S.P.C.M.)	15 September 1969	Founded by Sultan Idris Shah II.
(1969–2000) (2001–2010) (since 2011)	The Most Illustrious Order of Cura Si Manja Kini (the Perak Sword of State); Darjah Kebesaran Negeri Perak Yang Amat Mulia Cura Si Manja Kini	Knight Commander or Dato’ (D.P.C.M.)	15 September 1969	Founded by Sultan Idris Shah II.
(1969–2000) (2001–2010) (since 2011)	The Most Illustrious Order of Cura Si Manja Kini (the Perak Sword of State); Darjah Kebesaran Negeri Perak Yang Amat Mulia Cura Si Manja Kini	Commander or Paduka (P.C.M.)	15 September 1969	Founded by Sultan Idris Shah II.
(1969–2000) (2001–2010) (since 2011)	The Most Illustrious Order of Cura Si Manja Kini (the Perak Sword of State); Darjah Kebesaran Negeri Perak Yang Amat Mulia Cura Si Manja Kini	Member or Ahli (A.C.M.)	19 April 1989	Founded by Sultan Idris Shah II.
(1977–2000) (2001–2013) (since 2014)	The Most Valliant Order of Taming Sari (the Perak State Kris); Darjah Kebesaran Taming Sari Negeri Perak Yang Amat Perkasa	Dato’ Seri Panglima (S.P.T.S.)	1977	Founded by Sultan Idris Shah II. Awarded to military and police personnel.
(1977–2000) (2001–2013) (since 2014)	The Most Valliant Order of Taming Sari (the Perak State Kris); Darjah Kebesaran Taming Sari Negeri Perak Yang Amat Perkasa	Dato’ Pahlawan (D.P.T.S.)	1977	Founded by Sultan Idris Shah II. Awarded to military and police personnel.
(1977–1989)	The Most Valliant Order of Taming Sari (the Perak State Kris); Darjah Kebesaran Taming Sari Negeri Perak Yang Amat Perkasa	Pirwira (Paduka) (P.T.S.)	1977	Founded by Sultan Idris Shah II. Awarded to military and police personnel.
(1977–1989)	The Most Valliant Order of Taming Sari (the Perak State Kris); Darjah Kebesaran Taming Sari Negeri Perak Yang Amat Perkasa	Hulubalang (H.T.S.)	1977	Founded by Sultan Idris Shah II. Awarded to military and police personnel.
(1977–1989)	The Most Valliant Order of Taming Sari (the Perak State Kris); Darjah Kebesaran Taming Sari Negeri Perak Yang Amat Perkasa	Kshatriya (K.T.S.)	1977	Founded by Sultan Idris Shah II. Awarded to military and police personnel.
(1977–1989)	The Most Valliant Order of Taming Sari (the Perak State Kris); Darjah Kebesaran Taming Sari Negeri Perak Yang Amat Perkasa	Perajurit (Ahli) (A.T.S.)	1977	Founded by Sultan Idris Shah II. Awarded to military and police personnel.
(1957–2001) (since 2001)	The Most Illustrious Order of the Perak State Crown; Darjah Kebesaran Mahkota Negeri Perak Yang Amat Mulia	Knight Grand Commander or Dato’ Seri (S.P.M.P.)	12 December 1957	Founded by Sultan Yusuf Izzuddin Shah.
(1957–2001) (since 2001)	The Most Illustrious Order of the Perak State Crown; Darjah Kebesaran Mahkota Negeri Perak Yang Amat Mulia	Knight Commander or Dato’ (D.P.M.P.)	12 December 1957	Founded by Sultan Yusuf Izzuddin Shah.
(1957–2001) (since 2001)	The Most Illustrious Order of the Perak State Crown; Darjah Kebesaran Mahkota Negeri Perak Yang Amat Mulia	Commander or Paduka (P.M.P.)	12 December 1957	Founded by Sultan Yusuf Izzuddin Shah.
(1957–2001) (since 2001)	The Most Illustrious Order of the Perak State Crown; Darjah Kebesaran Mahkota Negeri Perak Yang Amat Mulia	Member or Ahli (A.M.P.)	12 December 1957	Founded by Sultan Yusuf Izzuddin Shah.
Stars and Medals
Ribbon	Name (English/Malay)	Ranks / Letters	Instituted	Awarded to/for
	Conspicuous Gallantry Medal; Pingat Keberanian Handal	Star (P.K.H.)	15 January 1951	Instituted by Yusuf Izzuddin Shah as a reward for conspicuous gallantry and heroism. Awarded in a single class, originally a silver medal similar to the design of the P.P.T. but now a four-pointed enamelled. Bars may be awarded to signify subsequent acts of gallantry.
	Distinguished Conduct Medal; Pingat Pekerti Terpilih	Bronze medal (P.P.T.)	15 January 1951	Instituted by Sultan Yusuf Izzuddin Shah to reward conspicuous bravery. Bars may be awarded to signify subsequent acts of bravery.
	Meritorious Service Medal; Pingat Jasa Kebaktian	Bronze medal (P.J.K.)	15 January 1951	Instituted by Sultan Yusuf Izzuddin Shah to reward meritorious public service in state employ.
	Long Service Medal; Pingat Lama Perkhidmatan	Bronze medal (P.L.P.)	15 September 1969	Instituted by Sultan Idris Shah II to reward long service in state employ of at least twenty-five years continuous duration.
	Installation Medal 1963; Pingat Pertabalan 1963	Silver medal	26 October 1963	Instituted by Sultan Idris Shah II to commemorate his installation as Sultan on 26 October 1963.
	Installation Medal 1985; Pingat Pertabalan 1985	Silver medal	9 December 1985	Instituted by Sultan Azlan Shah to commemorate his installation as Sultan on 9 December 1985.
	Installation Medal 2015; Pingat Pertabalan 2015	Silver medal	6 May 2015	Instituted by Sultan Nazrin Shah to commemorate his installation as Sultan on 6 May 2015.
	Silver Jubilee Medal 2009; Pingat Jubli Perak 2009	Silver medal	2009	Instituted by Sultan Azlan Shah to commemorate his Silver Jubilee in 2009.

==== Perlis ====
The orders, decorations, and medals given by the Raja of Perlis are:

Orders
Ribbon	Name (English/Malay)	Ranks / Letters	Instituted	Awarded to/for
	The Most Esteemed Royal Family Order of Perlis; Darjah Kerabat Diraja Perlis Yang Amat Dihormati	Member or Ahli (D.K.P.)	17 May 2001	Founded by Raja Syed Sirajuddin. Without any title attached and at the personal discretion of the ruler.
	The Most Esteemed Perlis Family Order of the Gallant Prince Syed Putra Jamalullail; Darjah Kerabat Perlis Baginda Tuanku Syed Putra Jamalullail Yang Amat Dihormati	Member or Ahli (D.K.)	21 September 1965	Founded by Raja Syed Putra as a family order. Limited to members of the Perlis and allied Royal families.
	The Order of Dato’ Bendahara Sri Jamalullail; Darjah Kebesaran Dato’ Bendahara Sri Jamalullail	Dato’ Sri Diraja Bendahara Negara (D.B.S.J.)	2006	Founded by Raja Syed Sirajuddin as a special decoration of honour for distinguished statesmen.
	The Most Esteemed Order of the Gallant Prince Syed Sirajuddin Jamalullail; Darjah Kebesaran Baginda Tuanku Syed Sirajuddin Jamalullail Yang Amat Dihormati	Knight Grand Companion or Sri Setia (S.S.S.J.)	2001	Founded by Raja Syed Sirajuddin. With the title of Dato’ Sri Diraja.
	The Most Esteemed Order of the Gallant Prince Syed Sirajuddin Jamalullail; Darjah Kebesaran Baginda Tuanku Syed Sirajuddin Jamalullail Yang Amat Dihormati	Knight Companion or Dato’ Setia (D.S.S.J.)	2001	Founded by Raja Syed Sirajuddin.
	The Most Esteemed Order of the Gallant Prince Syed Sirajuddin Jamalullail; Darjah Kebesaran Baginda Tuanku Syed Sirajuddin Jamalullail Yang Amat Dihormati	Knight Commander or Dato’ Setia Paduka (D.S.P.J.)	2001	Founded by Raja Syed Sirajuddin.
	The Order of Prince Syed Sirajuddin Jamalullail of Perlis; Darjah Kebesaran Tuanku Syed Sirajuddin Jamalullail Perlis	Knight Grand Companion or Setia Paduka (S.P.S.J.)	2005	Founded by Raja Syed Sirajuddin. With the title of Dato’ Sri Diraja.
	The Order of Prince Syed Sirajuddin Jamalullail of Perlis; Darjah Kebesaran Tuanku Syed Sirajuddin Jamalullail Perlis	Dato’ Wira (D.W.S.J.)	2005	Founded by Raja Syed Sirajuddin.
	The Order of Prince Syed Sirajuddin Jamalullail of Perlis; Darjah Kebesaran Tuanku Syed Sirajuddin Jamalullail Perlis	Knight Commander or Dato’ Panglima (D.P.S.J.)	2005	Founded by Raja Syed Sirajuddin.
	The Order of Prince Syed Sirajuddin Jamalullail of Perlis; Darjah Kebesaran Tuanku Syed Sirajuddin Jamalullail Perlis	Companion or Sri (S.S.P.)	2005	Founded by Raja Syed Sirajuddin.
	The Most Esteemed Order of the Gallant Prince Syed Putra Jamalullail; Darjah Kebesaran Baginda Tuanku Syed Putra Jamalullail Yang Amat Dihormati	Knight Grand Companion or Dato’ Sri Setia (S.S.P.J.)	22 June 1995	Founded by Raja Syed Putra. With the title of Dato’ Sri Diraja. Made obsolete in 2001 but appointments revived in 2007.
	The Most Esteemed Order of the Gallant Prince Syed Putra Jamalullail; Darjah Kebesaran Baginda Tuanku Syed Putra Jamalullail Yang Amat Dihormati	Knight Companion or Dato’ Setia (D.S.P.J.)	22 June 1995	Founded by Raja Syed Putra. Made obsolete in 2001 but appointments revived in 2007.
	The Most Esteemed Order of the Gallant Prince Syed Putra Jamalullail; Darjah Kebesaran Baginda Tuanku Syed Putra Jamalullail Yang Amat Dihormati	Knight Commander or Dato’ Paduka (D.P.P.J.)	22 June 1995	Founded by Raja Syed Putra. Made obsolete in 2001 but appointments revived in 2007.
	The Most Illustrious Order of the Crown of Perlis (Star of Safi); Darjah Kebesaran Mahkota Perlis Yang Amat Mulia (Bintang al-Safi)	Knight Grand Commander or Dato’ Sri Paduka (S.P.M.P.)	21 September 1965	Founded by Raja Syed Putra. With the title of Dato’ Sri Diraja.
	The Most Illustrious Order of the Crown of Perlis (Star of Safi); Darjah Kebesaran Mahkota Perlis Yang Amat Mulia (Bintang al-Safi)	Knight Commander or Dato’ Paduka (D.P.M.P.)	21 September 1965	Founded by Raja Syed Putra.
	The Most Illustrious Order of the Crown of Perlis (Star of Safi); Darjah Kebesaran Mahkota Perlis Yang Amat Mulia (Bintang al-Safi)	Companion or Setia (S.M.P.)	21 September 1965	Founded by Raja Syed Putra.
	The Most Illustrious Order of the Crown of Perlis (Star of Safi); Darjah Kebesaran Mahkota Perlis Yang Amat Mulia (Bintang al-Safi)	Member or Ahli (A.M.P.)	21 September 1965	Founded by Raja Syed Putra.
	The Most Illustrious Order of the Crown of Perlis (Star of Safi); Darjah Kebesaran Mahkota Perlis Yang Amat Mulia (Bintang al-Safi)	Medal or Pingat (P.M.P.)	22 June 1995	Founded by Raja Syed Putra to recognise the services of grade 3 departmental heads and community leaders of equivalent rank.
	The Order for Dato’ Titleholders; Darjah Dato’ Bergelar	Silver-gilt badge	27 December 1987	Founded by Raja Syed Putra to accompany the award of certain titular honours, namely: Dato’ Kurnia Bakti; Dato’ Indera Perkasa; Dato’ Indera Dewa; Dato’ Indera Jaya; Dato’ Indera Pahlawan; Dato’ Lela Perkasa; Dato’ Alim Panglima; Dato’ Kaya Bakti; Dato’ Setia Jaya; Dato’ Alim Setia; Awarded in a single class, a silver-gilt badge enamelled in blue suspended from a broad, blue, silk riband with a gold central band, worn in the same manner as the sash of a grand cross.
Stars and Medals
Ribbon	Name (English/Malay)	Ranks / Letters	Instituted	Awarded to/for
	Conspicuous Gallantry Medal; Pingat Keberanian Handal	Silver medal (P.K.H.)	9 May 1951	Instituted by Raja Syed Putra to reward conspicuous acts of gallantry of the highest order.
	Distinguished Conduct Medal; Pingat Pekerti Terpilih	Bronze medal (P.P.T.)	9 May 1951	Instituted by Raja Syed Putra as a reward for distinguished conduct.
	Meritorious Service Medal; Pingat Jasa Kebaktian	Bronze medal (P.J.K.)	9 May 1951	Instituted by Raja Syed Putra as a reward for meritorious services in state employ, for those employed in state service in civil service grades three to seven.
	Meritorious Conduct Medal; Pingat Jasa Baik	Bronze medal (P.J.B.)	30 May 1968	Instituted by Raja Syed Putra as a reward for meritorious conduct in state employ, for those employed in state service in civil service grades eight to eleven.
	Long Service Medal; Pingat Perkhidmatan Lama	Silver medal (P.P.L.)	4 July 1962	Instituted by Raja Syed Putra as a reward for twenty-five years of long service in state employ.
	Installation Medal 2001; Pingat Pertabalan 2001	Silver medal	7 May 2001	Instituted by Tuanku Syed Sirajuddin Jamalullail to commemorate his installation as Raja in 2001.
	10th Reign Anniversary Medal; Pingat Peringatan 10 Tahun Pemerintahan	Silver medal	7 May 2011	Instituted by Tuanku Syed Sirajuddin Jamalullail to commemorate his 10th Reign Anniversary in 2011.
	Silver Jubilee Medal 2025; Pingat Jubli Perak 2025	Silver medal	17 April 2025	Instituted by Tuanku Syed Sirajuddin Jamalullail to commemorate his 25th Reign Anniversary in 2025.

==== Selangor ====
The orders, decorations, and medals given by the Sultan of Selangor are:

Orders
Ribbon	Name (English/Malay)	Ranks / Letters	Instituted	Awarded to/for
	The Most Esteemed Royal Family Order of Selangor; Darjah Kerabat Selangor Yang Amat Dihormati	First Class (D.K. I)	6 June 1961	Founded by Sultan Salahuddin Abdul Aziz Shah. Awarded to members of the Selangor and other Royal families, and to high officers of state.
	The Most Esteemed Royal Family Order of Selangor; Darjah Kerabat Selangor Yang Amat Dihormati	Second Class (D.K. II)	6 June 1961	Founded by Sultan Salahuddin Abdul Aziz Shah. Awarded to members of the Selangor and other Royal families, and to high officers of state.
	The Most Illustrious Order of the Crown of Selangor; Darjah Kebesaran Mahkota Selangor Yang Amat Mulia	Knight Grand Commander or Dato’ Seri (S.P.M.S.)	6 June 1961	Founded by Sultan Salahuddin Abdul Aziz Shah as a reward for general services to the sultan and state of Selangor.
	The Most Illustrious Order of the Crown of Selangor; Darjah Kebesaran Mahkota Selangor Yang Amat Mulia	Knight Commander or Dato’ (D.P.M.S.)	6 June 1961	Founded by Sultan Salahuddin Abdul Aziz Shah as a reward for general services to the sultan and state of Selangor.
	The Most Illustrious Order of the Crown of Selangor; Darjah Kebesaran Mahkota Selangor Yang Amat Mulia	Companion or Setia (S.M.S.)	6 June 1961	Founded by Sultan Salahuddin Abdul Aziz Shah as a reward for general services to the sultan and state of Selangor.
	The Most Illustrious Order of the Crown of Selangor; Darjah Kebesaran Mahkota Selangor Yang Amat Mulia	Member or Ahli (A.M.S.)	6 June 1961	Founded by Sultan Salahuddin Abdul Aziz Shah as a reward for general services to the sultan and state of Selangor.
	The Order of Sultan Sharafuddin Idris Shah; Darjah Kebesaran Sultan Sharafuddin Idris Shah	Knight Grand Companion or Dato’ Setia (S.S.I.S.)	14 December 2002	Founded by Sultan Sharafuddin Idris Shah.
	The Order of Sultan Sharafuddin Idris Shah; Darjah Kebesaran Sultan Sharafuddin Idris Shah	Knight Companion or Dato’ (D.S.I.S.)	14 December 2002	Founded by Sultan Sharafuddin Idris Shah.
	The Order of Sultan Sharafuddin Idris Shah; Darjah Kebesaran Sultan Sharafuddin Idris Shah	Companion or Setia (S.I.S.)	14 December 2002	Founded by Sultan Sharafuddin Idris Shah.
	The Order of Sultan Sharafuddin Idris Shah; Darjah Kebesaran Sultan Sharafuddin Idris Shah	Member or Ahli (A.I.S.)	14 December 2002	Founded by Sultan Sharafuddin Idris Shah.
(1985–2001)	The Order of Sultan Salahuddin Abdul Aziz Shah; Darjah Kebesaran Sultan Salahuddin Abdul Aziz Shah	Knight Grand Companion or Dato’ Seri (S.S.S.A.)	30 September 1985	Founded by Sultan Salahuddin Abdul Aziz Shah. Made obsolete in 2001.
(1985–2001)	The Order of Sultan Salahuddin Abdul Aziz Shah; Darjah Kebesaran Sultan Salahuddin Abdul Aziz Shah	Knight Companion or Dato’ (D.S.S.A.)	30 September 1985	Founded by Sultan Salahuddin Abdul Aziz Shah. Made obsolete in 2001.
(1985–2001)	The Order of Sultan Salahuddin Abdul Aziz Shah; Darjah Kebesaran Sultan Salahuddin Abdul Aziz Shah	Companion or Setia (S.S.A.)	30 September 1985	Founded by Sultan Salahuddin Abdul Aziz Shah. Made obsolete in 2001.
(1985–2001)	The Order of Sultan Salahuddin Abdul Aziz Shah; Darjah Kebesaran Sultan Salahuddin Abdul Aziz Shah	Member or Ahli (A.S.A.)	30 September 1985	Founded by Sultan Salahuddin Abdul Aziz Shah. Made obsolete in 2001.
Stars and Medals
Ribbon	Name (English/Malay)	Ranks / Letters	Instituted	Awarded to/for
	Distinguished Service Star; Bintang Perkhidmatan Cemerlang	Silver star (B.P.C.)	1982	Instituted by Sultan Salahuddin Abdul Aziz Shah as a reward for distinguished services to the state, in the rank of officer or executive, or above.
	Conspicuous Gallantry Medal; Pingat Keberanian Yang Terbilang	Silver medal (P.K.T.)	1951	Instituted by Sultan Hishamuddin Alam Shah as a reward for supreme acts of gallantry within the borders of the Selangor state.
	Distinguished Conduct Medal; Pingat Pekerti Yang Terpilih	Silver medal (P.P.T.)	1951	Instituted by Sultan Hishamuddin Alam Shah as a reward for acts of distinguished and gallant conduct within the state of Selangor.
	Meritorious Service Medal; Pingat Jasa Kebaktian	Silver medal (P.J.K.)	1951	Instituted by Sultan Hishamuddin Alam Shah as a reward for meritorious services to the state, including resourcefulness, devotion to duty, long service, exceptional ability or exemplary conduct.
	Distinguished Service Medal; Pingat Perkhidmatan Cemerlang	Silver medal (P.P.C.)	1982	Instituted by Sultan Salahuddin Abdul Aziz Shah as a reward for distinguished services to the state, by those in non-executive positions or below.
	Selangor Service Medal; Pingat Perkhidmatan Selangor	Silver medal (P.P.S.)	1977	Instituted by Sultan Salahuddin Abdul Aziz Shah as a reward for long, meritorious and faithful service to the state of not less than twenty years.
	Coronation Medal 1961; Pingat Kemahkotaan 1961	Silver medal.	28 June 1961	Instituted by Sultan Salahuddin Abdul Aziz Shah to commemorate his Coronation on 28 June 1961.
	Silver Jubilee Medal 1985; Pingat Jubli Perak 1985	Silver medal	1985	Instituted by Sultan Salahuddin Abdul Aziz Shah to commemorate his Silver Jubilee in 1985.
	Coronation Medal 2003; Pingat Kemahkotaan 2003	Silver medal.	2003	Instituted by Sultan Sharafuddin Idris Shah to commemorate his Coronation in 2003.
	Silver Jubilee Medal 2026; Pingat Jubli Perak 2026	Silver medal	25 October 2026	Instituted by Sultan Sharafuddin Idris Shah to commemorate his Silver Jubilee on 25 October 2026.

==== Terengganu ====
The orders, decorations, and medals given by the Sultan of Terengganu are:

Orders
Ribbon	Name (English/Malay)	Ranks / Letters	Instituted	Awarded to/for
	The Most Exalted Supreme Royal Family Order of Terengganu; Darjah Utama Kerabat Diraja Terengganu Yang Amat Dihormati	Member or Ahli (D.K.T.)	10 March 1981	Founded by Sultan Mahmud al-Muktafi Billah Shah. Limited to ruling princes.
	The Most Distinguished Royal Family Order of Terengganu; Darjah Kerabat Diraja Terengganu Yang Amat Mulia	Member or Ahli (D.K.R.)	6 July 2000	Founded by Sultan Mizan Zainal Abidin as a family order for members of the Trengganu and other Royal houses.
	The Most Distinguished Family Order of Terengganu; Darjah Kebesaran Kerabat Terengganu Yang Amat Mulia	First Class Member or Ahli Yang Pertama (D.K. I)	19 June 1962	Founded by Sultan Ismail Nasiruddin Shah as a family order for members of the Trengganu and other Royal houses. Max. 16 recipients at any one time.
	The Most Distinguished Family Order of Terengganu; Darjah Kebesaran Kerabat Terengganu Yang Amat Mulia	Second Class Member or Ahli Yang Kedua (D.K. II)	19 June 1962	Founded by Sultan Ismail Nasiruddin Shah. Max. 24 recipients.
	The Most Select Order of Sultan Mizan Zainal Abidin of Terengganu; Darjah Kebesaran Sultan Mizan Zainal Abidin Terengganu Yang Amat Terpilih	Supreme Class or Dato' Seri Utama (S.U.M.Z.)	26 May 2005	Founded by Sultan Mizan Zainal Abidin.
	The Most Select Order of Sultan Mizan Zainal Abidin of Terengganu; Darjah Kebesaran Sultan Mizan Zainal Abidin Terengganu Yang Amat Terpilih	Knight Grand Companion or Dato' Seri (S.S.M.Z.)	6 July 2001	Founded by Sultan Mizan Zainal Abidin.
(2001–2012) (since 2012)	The Most Select Order of Sultan Mizan Zainal Abidin of Terengganu; Darjah Kebesaran Sultan Mizan Zainal Abidin Terengganu Yang Amat Terpilih	Knight Companion or Dato' (D.S.M.Z.)	6 July 2001	Founded by Sultan Mizan Zainal Abidin.
	The Most Select Order of Sultan Mizan Zainal Abidin of Terengganu; Darjah Kebesaran Sultan Mizan Zainal Abidin Terengganu Yang Amat Terpilih	Companion or Setia (S.M.Z.)	6 July 2001	Founded by Sultan Mizan Zainal Abidin.
	The Most Select Order of Sultan Mizan Zainal Abidin of Terengganu; Darjah Kebesaran Sultan Mizan Zainal Abidin Terengganu Yang Amat Terpilih	Member or Ahli (A.M.Z.)	6 July 2001	Founded by Sultan Mizan Zainal Abidin.
	The Most Revered Order of Sultan Mahmud I of Terengganu; Darjah Kebesaran Sultan Mahmud I Terengganu Yang Amat Terpuji	Knight Grand Companion or Dato' Seri (S.S.M.T.)	28 February 1982	Founded by Sultan Mahmud al-Muktafi Billah Shah. Max. 16 recipients.
	The Most Revered Order of Sultan Mahmud I of Terengganu; Darjah Kebesaran Sultan Mahmud I Terengganu Yang Amat Terpuji	Knight Companion or Dato' (D.S.M.T.)	28 February 1982	Founded by Sultan Mahmud al-Muktafi Billah Shah. Max. 32 recipients.
	The Most Revered Order of Sultan Mahmud I of Terengganu; Darjah Kebesaran Sultan Mahmud I Terengganu Yang Amat Terpuji	Member or Ahli (A.S.M.)	28 February 1982	Founded by Sultan Mahmud al-Muktafi Billah Shah. Max. 60 recipients.
	The Most Distinguished Order of the Crown of Terengganu; Darjah Kebesaran Mahkota Terengganu Yang Amat Mulia	Knight Grand Commander or Dato' (S.P.M.T.)	19 June 1962	Founded by Sultan Ismail Nasiruddin Shah. Max. 25 recipients.
	The Most Distinguished Order of the Crown of Terengganu; Darjah Kebesaran Mahkota Terengganu Yang Amat Mulia	Knight Commander or Dato' (D.P.M.T.)	19 June 1962	Founded by Sultan Ismail Nasiruddin Shah. Max. 50 recipients.
	The Most Distinguished Order of the Crown of Terengganu; Darjah Kebesaran Mahkota Terengganu Yang Amat Mulia	Companion or Setia (S.M.T.)	19 June 1962	Founded by Sultan Ismail Nasiruddin Shah. Max. 100 recipients.
	The Most Distinguished Order of the Crown of Terengganu; Darjah Kebesaran Mahkota Terengganu Yang Amat Mulia	Member or Ahli (A.M.T.)	19 June 1962	Founded by Sultan Ismail Nasiruddin Shah. Max. 200 recipients.
Stars and Medals
Ribbon	Name (English/Malay)	Ranks / Letters	Instituted	Awarded to/for
	Conspicuous Gallantry Star; Bintang Keberanian Handal	Silver star (B.K.H.)	7 July 1981	Instituted by Sultan Mahmud al-Muktafi Billah Shah to reward supreme acts of gallantry within the borders of the state of Trengganu or by Trengganu subjects. Limited to officers.
	Conspicuous Gallantry Medal; Pingat Keberanian Handal	Silver medal (P.K.H.)	22 June 1951	Instituted by Sultan Ismail Nasiruddin Shah as a reward for supreme acts of gallantry within the borders of the state of Trengganu or by Trengganu subjects. Limited to non-commissioned officers and other ranks after 1981.
	Distinguished Conduct Medal; Pingat Pekerti Terpilih	Nickel medal (P.P.T.)	22 June 1951	Instituted by Sultan Ismail Nasiruddin Shah as a reward for acts of bravery and distinguished conduct within the borders of the state of Trengganu or by Trengganu subjects.
	Distinguished Service Medal; Pingat Jasa Cemerlang	Silver medal (P.J.C.)	10 March 1981	Instituted by Sultan Mahmud al-Muktafi Billah Shah to reward distinguished services to the state.
	Meritorious Service Medal; Pingat Jasa Kebaktian	Bronze medal (P.J.K.)	22 June 1951	Instituted by Sultan Ismail Nasiruddin Shah as a reward for meritorious services to the state.
	Long Service and Good Conduct Star; Bintang Kerana Lama Berjawatan dan Baik Pekerti	Six-pointed silver star (B.L.B.)	10 January 1955	Instituted by Sultan Ismail Nasiruddin Shah as a reward for twenty-one years of continuous long service and good conduct in state service, at the level of officer or executive, or above.
	Long Service and Good Conduct Medal; Pingat Kerana Lama Berjawatan dan Baik Pekerti	Medal in white metal (P.L.B.)	10 January 1955	Instituted by Sultan Ismail Nasiruddin Shah as a reward for twenty-one years of continuous long service and good conduct in state service, at the non-executive level or below.
	Jubilee Medal; Pingat Jubli	Silver medal	1970	Instituted by Sultan Ismail Nasiruddin Shah to commemorate his Silver Jubilee in 1970.
	Defence Medal; Pingat Pertahanan	Silver medal	1972	Instituted by Sultan Ismail Nasiruddin Shah in 1972 as a medal of service.
	Installation Medal 1981; Pingat Pertabalan 1981	Silver medal	1981	Instituted by Sultan Mahmud al-Muktafi Billah Shah to commemorate his installation as Sultan in 1981.
	Installation Medal 1999; Pingat Pertabalan 1999	Silver medal	1999	Instituted by Sultan Mizan Zainal Abidin to commemorate his installation as Sultan in 1999.
	Silver Jubilee Medal 2023; Pingat Jubli Perak 2023	Silver medal	2023	Instituted by Sultan Mizan Zainal Abidin to commemorate his 25th reign anniversary in 2023.

== See also ==
- Orders, decorations, and medals of Malaysia
