= Wan Mokhtar Ahmad =

Malaysian politician (1932–2020)

Yang Berbahagia Tan Sri Dato' Seri Wan Mokhtar Wan Ahmad PSM SSMT SPMT DA DPMJ KMN JP PJK
- وان مختار وان أحمد

10th Menteri Besar of Terengganu
- In office 1 September 1974 – 2 December 1999
- Monarchs: Ismail Nasiruddin (1974–1979); Mahmud (1979–1998); Mizan Zainal Abidin (1998–1999)
- Preceded by: Nik Hassan Wan Abdul Rahman
- Succeeded by: Abdul Hadi Awang

Member of the Malaysian Parliament for Kemaman
- In office 25 April 1964 – 23 August 1974
- Preceded by: Wan Yahya Wan Mohamed (Alliance–UMNO)
- Succeeded by: Wan Abdul Kadir Ismail (BN–UMNO)
- Majority: 7,081 (1964); 894 (1969)

Member of the Terengganu State Legislative Assembly for Cukai
- In office 24 August 1974 – 29 November 1999
- Preceded by: Teh Hassan (Alliance–UMNO)
- Succeeded by: Awang Jusoh (PAS)

Malaysian Ambassador to Saudi Arabia
- In office 23 November 2000 – 1 June 2005
- Monarch: Sirajuddin
- Prime Minister: Mahathir Mohamad (2000–03); Abdullah Ahmad Badawi (2003–05)
- Preceded by: Shapi Abu Samah
- Succeeded by: Ismail Ibrahim

Personal details
- Born: Wan Mokhtar bin Wan Ahmad; 21 March 1932 Kuala Terengganu, Terengganu, Unfederated Malay States, British Malaya (now Malaysia)
- Died: 21 September 2020 (aged 88) Prince Court Medical Centre, Ampang, Kuala Lumpur
- Resting place: Section 21 Muslim Cemetery, Shah Alam, Selangor
- Party: United Malays National Organisation (UMNO)
- Other political affiliations: Alliance Party; Barisan Nasional (BN)
- Spouse: Aishahtun Mohd Fadlullah Suhaimi (died 2018)
- Children: 5
- Education: Al-Azhar University

Wan Mokhtar bin Wan Ahmad (21 March 1932 – 21 September 2020) was a Malaysian politician who served as the 11th Menteri Besar of Terengganu. In office for 25 years, he was the longest-serving head of the Terengganu state government (1974 - 1999). He also served as Member of Parliament (MP) for Kemaman (1964 - 1974) and Member of the Terengganu State Legislative Assembly (MLA) for Cukai (1974 - 1999).

Wan Mokhtar was a member of the United Malays National Organisation (UMNO) in the then-ruling Alliance and Barisan Nasional (BN) coalition. He was an ally of the similarly longest-serving Prime Minister Mahathir Mohamad. In 1987, he was elected the vice-president of UMNO, alongside Anwar Ibrahim, under Mahathir's running team.

His political prominence in the state came to an end in the 1999 state election, when the then-opposition Pan-Malaysian Islamic Party (PAS) ousted the Barisan Nasional (BN) state government with a landslide victory. He also lost his Chukai state seat then. He was then appointed as the Malaysian Ambassador to Saudi Arabia from 2000 to 2005.

== Personal life ==
Wan Mokhtar was married to Aishahtun Mohd Fadlullah Suhaimi (1937–2018) and the couple had five children. One of his sons, Wan Abdul Hakim was elected in the 2013 state election as the MLA for the Air Putih state assembly constituency for one term from 2013 to 2018 before being defeated in the next state elections.

== Death ==
On 21 September 2020, Wan Mokhtar died at 6:20 a.m. at Prince Court Medical Centre, Kuala Lumpur due to heart complications. He was 88 years old and is survived by his 5 children. He was laid to rest at the Section 21 Muslim Cemetery in Shah Alam, Selangor.

== Election results ==
Parliament of Malaysia
Year	Constituency	Candidate	Votes	Pct	Opponent(s)	Votes	Pct	Ballots cast	Majority	Turnout
1964	P029 Kemaman	Wan Mokhtar Ahmad (UMNO)	10,153	64.20%	Wan Hamid Wan Ibrahim (SF)	3,072	19.43%	16,556	7,081	75.21%
1964	P029 Kemaman	Wan Mokhtar Ahmad (UMNO)	10,153	64.20%	Syed Noh Alwee (PMIP)	2,589	16.37%	16,556	7,081	75.21%
1969	P029 Kemaman	Wan Mokhtar Ahmad (UMNO)	9,428	52.49%	Wan Yahya Wan Mohamed (PMIP)	8,534	47.51%	18,872	894	70.02%

Terengganu State Legislative Assembly
Year	Constituency	Candidate	Votes	Pct	Opponent(s)	Votes	Pct	Ballots cast	Majority	Turnout
1974	N28 Chukai	Wan Mokhtar Ahmad (UMNO)	3,429	59.54%	Mohamad Bin Abdul Rahman (PSRM)	1,858	32.26%	5,759	1,571	69.19%
1978	N28 Chukai	Wan Mokhtar Ahmad (UMNO)								
1982	N28 Chukai	Wan Mokhtar Ahmad (UMNO)								
1986	N31 Cukai	Wan Mokhtar Ahmad (UMNO)	5,562	67.13%	Awang Dagang Yusof (PAS)	2,566	30.97%	8,650	2,996	72.17%
1986	N31 Cukai	Wan Mokhtar Ahmad (UMNO)	5,562	67.13%	Zainal Abidin Mustaffa (SDP)	158	1.91%	8,650	2,996	72.17%
1990	N31 Cukai	Wan Mokhtar Ahmad (UMNO)	6,206	58.39%	Alias Abdul Rahman (S46)	4,422	41.60%	10,962	1,784	77.70%
1995	N31 Cukai	Wan Mokhtar Ahmad (UMNO)	7,256	60.77%	Alias Abdul Rahman (S46)	4,685	39.23%	12,196	2,571	76.30%
1999	N31 Cukai	Wan Mokhtar Ahmad (UMNO)	6,128	48.28%	Awang Jusoh (PAS)	6,564	51.72%	12,894	436	78.47%

== Honours ==
=== Honours of Malaysia ===
- Malaysia
  - Commander of the Order of Loyalty to the Crown of Malaysia (PSM) – Tan Sri (1988)
  - Officer of the Order of the Defender of the Realm (KMN) (1971)
  - Recipient of the Malaysian Commemorative Medal (Silver) (PPM) (1965)
- Johor
  - Knight Commander of the Order of the Crown of Johor (DPMJ) – Dato' (1983)
- Sarawak
  - Knight Commander of the Order of the Star of Hornbill Sarawak (DA) – Datuk Amar (1981)
- Terengganu
  - Knight Grand Companion of the Order of Sultan Mahmud I of Terengganu (SSMT) – Dato' Seri (1983)
  - Knight Grand Commander of the Order of the Crown of Terengganu (SPMT) – Dato' (1976)
  - Meritorious Service Medal (PJK)
