= Tengku Muhammad Ismail =

Crown Prince of Terengganu (born 1998)

Tengku Muhammad Ismail تڠكو محمد إسماعيل
- Regent of Terengganu; Yang di-Pertuan Muda of Terengganu
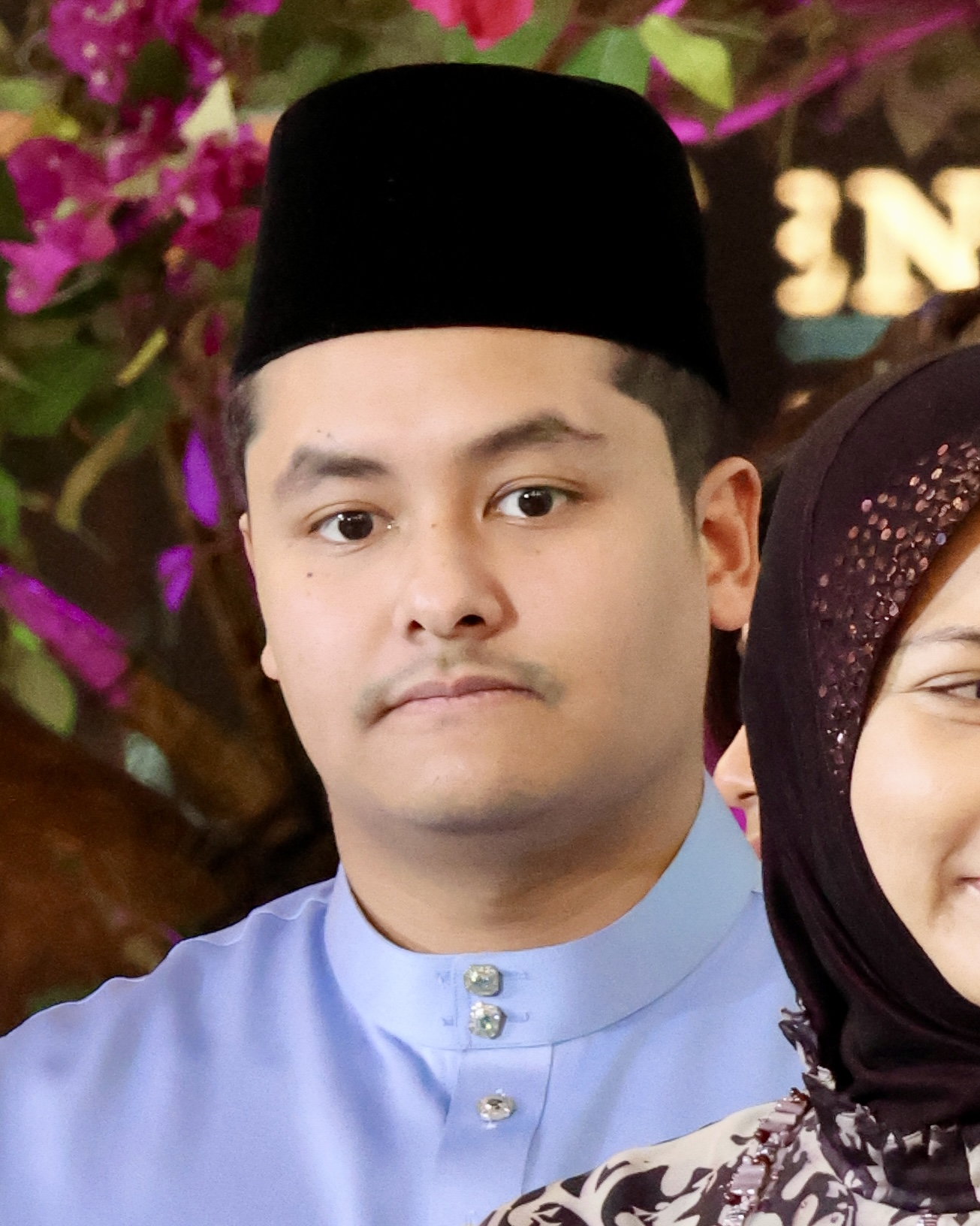
- Muhammad Ismail in 2023

Yang di-Pertuan Muda of Terengganu
- Tenure: 12 January 2006 – present
- Proclamation: 12 January 2006
- Predecessor: Tengku Mizan Zainal Abidin
- Born: Tengku Muhammad Ismail bin Tengku Mizan Zainal Abidin; 1 March 1998 (age 28); Kuala Terengganu, Terengganu, Malaysia
Regnal name
- Tengku Muhammad Ismail ibni Al-Wathiqu Billah Sultan Mizan Zainal Abidin
- House: Bendahara dynasty
- Father: Sultan Mizan Zainal Abidin
- Mother: Sultanah Nur Zahirah
- Religion: Sunni Islam
- Military career
- Allegiance: Malaysia
- Branch: Malaysian Army
- Service years: 2019–present
- Rank: Captain
- Unit: 512th Territorial Army Regiment

Tengku Muhammad Ismail ibni Al-Wathiqu Billah Sultan Mizan Zainal Abidin (Jawi: تڠكو محمد إسماعيل ابن الواثق بالله سلطان ميزان زين العابدين; né Tengku Muhammad Ismail bin Tengku Mizan Zainal Abidin, born 1 March 1998) is a member of the Terengganu royal family who is the Regent and Yang di-Pertuan Muda of Terengganu and heir apparent to the Terengganu throne. He is the eldest son of Sultan Mizan Zainal Abidin. He was the Regent of Terengganu when his father reigned as the 13th Yang di-Pertuan Agong of Malaysia from 2006 to 2011.

== Biography ==
Tengku Muhammad Ismail was born on 1 March 1998 as the eldest son and second child of Tengku Mizan Zainal Abidin, the then Yang di-Pertuan Muda (Crown Prince) of Terengganu and To’ Puan Seri Rozita binti Adil Bakeri. His father became the Sultan of Terengganu shortly after his birth, after which his mother became known as Permaisuri Nur Zahirah (née Rozita binti Adil Bakeri), the Permaisuri of Terengganu.

He was educated at Garden International School in Kuala Lumpur. He continued his studies in the United Kingdom.

He was appointed as the Yang di-Pertuan Muda (Crown Prince) of Terengganu on 12 January 2006.

After Sultan Mizan was elected as Yang di-Pertuan Agong, he appointed Tengku Muhammad Ismail, then aged eight, as Regent of Terengganu on 12 November 2006. Because of Tengku Muhammad Ismail's young age, a Regency Advisory Council was established to discharge his duties for him. The council's members were Tengku Baderulzaman, Sultan Mizan's younger brother, Tengku Sulaiman Sultan Ismail, Sultan Mizan's uncle, and Federal Court judge Abdul Kadir Sulaiman. He was proclaimed as regent during a ceremony on 12 December.

As regent, he presided over the swearing in of Menteri Besar Ahmad Said following the 2008 general election.

On 26 August 2010, upon reaching the age of 12 (baligh, the Islamic age of puberty), Tengku Muhammad Ismail was formally proclaimed as Regent during a ceremony at Istana Maziah. A Regency Representative Council was formed to discharge his duties as regent while he left the country to pursue his studies. The council consisted of Sultan Mizan's brother Tengku Mustaffa Kamel, and previous members of the Regency Advisory Council, Tengku Sulaiman and Abdul Kadir Sulaiman.

On 10 February 2025, Tengku Muhammad Ismail started his posting at State Economic Planning Unit (UPEN), before continuing on to his second posting at the Office of the Director of Land and Mines (PTG). Besides working for UPEN and PTG, he was also posted at the Kuala Nerus District and Land Office and at the Islamic Religious and Malay Customs Council (MAIDAM).

On 15 April 2026, Tengku Muhammad Ismail was appointed as Regent of Terengganu. The appointment was made as Sultan Mizan would be resting from all official duties and engagements on the advice of medical officers.

== Interests ==
Like his father, Tengku Muhammad Ismail is an equestrian, and has participated in international events. In June 2010, he finished in second place in the 90 km race at the RTES/D'Armor French Open in Corlay.

== Titles, styles, honours and recognitions ==
Styles of Tengku Muhammad Ismail
- Reference style: His Royal Highness
- Spoken style: Your Royal Highness
- Alternative style: Tuanku

The full title and style of Tengku Muhammad Ismail is:

His Royal Highness Tengku Muhammad Ismail ibni Al-Wathiqu Billah Sultan Mizan Zainal Abidin, D.K.R., D.K., S.S.M.Z., Regent of Terengganu

=== Honours of Terengganu ===
- Member of the Royal Family Order of Terengganu (DKR, 14 December 2011)
- First Class of the Family Order of Terengganu (DK I, 12 December 2006)
- Knight Grand Companion of the Order of Sultan Mizan Zainal Abidin of Terengganu (SSMZ) – Dato' Seri (12 December 2006)
- Recipient of the Sultan Mizan Zainal Abidin Coronation Medal (4 March 1999)
- Recipient of Sultan Mizan Zainal Abidin Silver Jubilee Medal (2023)

=== Honours of Malaysia ===
- Malaysia
  - Recipient of the 13th Yang di-Pertuan Agong Installation Medal (26 April 2007)
  - Recipient of the 15th Yang di-Pertuan Agong Installation Medal (24 April 2017)
- Kedah
  - Recipient of the Sultan Sallehuddin Installation Medal (22 October 2018)

Malaysian royalty
First Heir apparent	Line of succession to the throne of Terengganu; 1st position	Succeeded by Tengku Muhammad Mua'az
