= Order of the Crown of Terengganu =

Honorific order of the Sultanate of Terengganu

Order of the Crown of Terengganu Darjah Kebesaran Mahkota Terengganu Yang Amat Mulia

Awarded by Sultan of Terengganu
- Type: Order
- Status: Currently constituted
- Sovereign: Mizan Zainal Abidin of Terengganu
- Grades: Grand Commander (SPMT); Commander (DPMT); Officer (SMT); Member (AMT)

Precedence
- Next (higher): Order of Sultan Mizan Zainal Abidin of Terengganu -- Order of Sultan Mahmud I of Terengganu (dormant)
- Next (lower): Conspicuous Gallantry Star
- -- Ribbon bar of the order

The Most Distinguished Order of the Crown of Terengganu (Bahasa Melayu: Darjah Kebesaran Mahkota Terengganu Yang Amat Mulia) is an honorific order of the Sultanate of Terengganu.

== History ==
It was founded by Sultan Ismail Nasiruddin of Terengganu on 19 June 1962.

== Classes ==
It is awarded in four classes:

- Grand Commander or Dato' Sri Paduka (Max. 25 recipients) - S.P.M.T.
- Commander or Dato' Paduka (Max. 50 recipients) - D.P.M.T.
- Companion or Setia (Max. 100 recipients) - S.M.T.
- Member or Ahli (Max. 200 recipients) - A.M.T.

Ribbon pattern of the ranks
| S.P.M.T. | D.P.M.T. | S.M.T. | A.M.T. |

== Recipients ==
- Ismail Nasiruddin of Terengganu, the 4th Yang di-Pertuan Agong of Malaysia and the 16th Sultan of Terengganu
- Abdul Razak Hussein, the 2nd Prime Minister of Malaysia
- Mahmud of Terengganu, the 17th Sultan of Terengganu
- Mizan Zainal Abidin of Terengganu, the 18th and current Sultan of Terengganu
- Wan Mokhtar Ahmad, the 11th Menteri Besar of Terengganu
- Ahmad Sarji Abdul Hamid, the 9th Chief Secretary to the Government of Malaysia
- Salleh Abas, former Lord President of the Supreme Court
- Mohamed Rahmat, former Minister of Communications and Multimedia (Malaysia)
- Ismail Omar, the ninth Inspector-General of Police (Malaysia)
- Raja Mohamed Affandi, former Chief of Army (Malaysia) and Chief of Defence Forces (Malaysia)
- Vincent Tan, the founder of Berjaya Corporation Berhad
- Azizulhasni Awang, the first and the only Malaysian cyclist to win two medal at the Summer Olympics. Cycling sports only, not the entire Malaysia history of Olympics achievement.

== See also ==
- Orders, decorations, and medals of the Malaysian states and federal territories#Terengganu
- List of post-nominal letters (Terengganu)
