= Royal Family Order of Terengganu =

Royal Family Order of Terengganu Darjah Kerabat Diraja Terengganu Yang Amat Mulia

Awarded by Sultan of Terengganu
- Type: Order
- Status: Currently constituted
- Sovereign: Mizan Zainal Abidin of Terengganu
- Grades: Member or Ahli (D.K.R.)

Precedence
- Next (higher): Supreme Royal Family Order of Terengganu
- Next (lower): Family Order of Terengganu
- Ribbon bar of the order

The Most Distinguished Royal Family Order of Terengganu (Bahasa Melayu: Darjah Kerabat Diraja Terengganu Yang Amat Mulia) is an honorific order of the Sultanate of Terengganu, who is the constitutional head of Terengganu state in Malaysia.

== History ==
It was founded by Sultan Mizan Zainal Abidin of Terengganu on 6 July 2000 as a family order for members of the Terengganu and other Royal houses.

== Classes ==
It is awarded in one class:

- Member (Ahli) - D.K.R.

== Recipients ==
- Tengku Muhammad Ismail
- King Rama IX of Thailand
- Queen Sirikit of Thailand
