= Supreme Royal Family Order of Terengganu =

Supreme Royal Family Order of Terengganu Darjah Utama Kerabat Diraja Terengganu Yang Amat Dihormati

Awarded by Sultan of Terengganu
- Type: Order
- Status: Currently constituted
- Sovereign: Mizan Zainal Abidin of Terengganu
- Grades: Member or Ahli (D.K.T.)

Precedence
- Next (higher): None
- Next (lower): Royal Family Order of Terengganu
- Ribbon bar of the order

The Most Exalted Supreme Royal Family Order of Terengganu (Bahasa Melayu: Darjah Utama Kerabat Diraja Terengganu Yang Amat Dihormati) is an honorific order of the Sultanate of Terengganu

== History ==
It was founded by Sultan Mahmud of Terengganu on 10 March 1981.

== Classes ==
It is awarded and limited to ruling princes, in one class:

- Member (Ahli) - D.K.T.

== Insignia ==
The sash is worn from the left shoulder to the right hip.

== Recipients ==
- Sultan Hassanal Bolkiah of Brunei (1980)

=== Grand Masters ===
- Mahmud of Terengganu
- Mizan Zainal Abidin of Terengganu

=== Supreme Royal Family Order ===
- Mahmud of Terengganu
- Mizan Zainal Abidin of Terengganu
- Tengku Muhammad Ismail
