= 1976 in Malaysia =

- Decades: 1960s; 1970s; 1980s; 1990s
- See also: Other events of 1976; History of Malaysia • Timeline • Years

This article lists important figures and events in Malaysian public affairs during the year 1976, together with births and deaths of notable Malaysians.

== Incumbent political figures ==
=== Federal level ===
- Yang di-Pertuan Agong: Sultan Yahya Petra
- Raja Permaisuri Agong: Raja Perempuan Zainab
- Prime Minister:
  - Abdul Razak Hussein (until 14 January)
  - Hussein Onn (from 15 January)
- Deputy Prime Minister: Mahathir Mohamad (from 5 March)
- Lord President: Mohamed Suffian Mohamed Hashim

=== State level ===
- Sultan of Johor: Sultan Ismail
- Sultan of Kedah: Sultan Abdul Halim Muadzam Shah
- Sultan of Kelantan: Tengku Ismail Petra (Regent)
- Raja of Perlis: Tuanku Syed Putra
- Sultan of Perak: Sultan Idris Shah II
- Sultan of Pahang: Sultan Ahmad Shah (Deputy Yang di-Pertuan Agong)
- Sultan of Selangor: Sultan Salahuddin Abdul Aziz Shah
- Sultan of Terengganu: Sultan Ismail Nasiruddin Shah
- Yang di-Pertuan Besar of Negeri Sembilan: Tuanku Jaafar
- Yang di-Pertua Negeri (Governor) of Penang: Tun Sardon Jubir
- Yang di-Pertua Negeri (Governor) of Malacca: Tun Syed Zahiruddin bin Syed Hassan
- Yang di-Pertua Negeri (Governor) of Sarawak: Tun Tuanku Bujang Tuanku Othman
- Yang di-Pertua Negeri (Governor) of Sabah: Tun Mohd Hamdan Abdullah

== Events ==
- 14 January – Abdul Razak Hussein, second Malaysian prime minister died in London, United Kingdom due to leukaemia. On 16 January, his body was brought back to Malaysia and laid to rest at Makam Pahlawan near Masjid Negara, Kuala Lumpur.
- 15 January – Hussein Onn replaced Tun Abdul Razak as prime minister.
- 21 February – Subang Jaya, a new township in Petaling Jaya, Selangor developed by Sime Darby was established.
- 28 February – Yahya Petra of Kelantan was installed as the sixth Yang di-Pertuan Agong.
- 5 March – Mahathir Mohamad was appointed Deputy Prime Minister of Malaysia.
- 8 April – The 20-storey Campbell Shopping Complex, Kuala Lumpur's very first high-rise shopping complex was completely destroyed in a fire. It was Malaysia's first towering inferno and the worst fire disaster involving a high-rise building to date.
- 27 April – A Royal Malaysian Air Force RMAF's Sikorsky S-61 Nuri helicopter was shot down by communist terrorists in Gubir, Kedah killing eleven Malaysian Armed Forces (MAF) military personnel. This was the first person killed in action (KIA) in RMAF history.
- 6 June – Ten passengers, including Sabah chief minister and former state Yang di-Pertua Negeri (Governor), Tun Fuad Stephens, and one crew were killed in a plane crashes 1976 near Kota Kinabalu. Tun Fuad Stephens' body was interred at State Mausoleum near Sabah State Mosque, Kota Kinabalu.
- 18 October – The 25th anniversary of the Employees Provident Fund was celebrated.
- 21 October – The opening of Sultan Abu Bakar Museum in Pekan District, Pahang.
- 14 December – The Kuala Lumpur Stock Exchange (KLSE) was incorporated.

== Births ==
- 23 January – Shahrol Yuzy – Malaysian motorcycle Grand Prix rider
- 6 February – Choong Tan Fook – Badminton player (doubles)
- 28 May – Chew Choon Eng – Badminton player (doubles)
- 21 June – Wan Saiful Wan Jan – politician
- 20 July – Alex Yoong – F1 and A1GP driver
- 31 August – Ah Niu – Malaysian Chinese singer

== Deaths ==
- 14 January – Abdul Razak Hussein, 2nd Prime Minister of Malaysia (b. 1922).
- 14 March – Wan Abdul Kadir Ismail, UMNO Member of Parliament for Kemaman (b. 1929).
- 9 May – Athi Nahappan, MIC Member of the Dewan Negara (b. 1925).
- 6 June – Tun Fuad Stephens, 1st & 5th Chief Minister of Sabah (b. 1920).
- 16 October – Raja Uda, 1st Yang di-Pertuan Negeri of Penang (b. 1894).

== See also ==
- 1976
- 1975 in Malaysia | 1977 in Malaysia
- History of Malaysia
