= 1975 in Malaysia =

- Decades: 1960s; 1970s; 1980s; 1990s
- See also: Other events of 1975; History of Malaysia • Timeline • Years

This article lists important figures and events in Malaysian public affairs during the year 1975, together with births and deaths of notable Malaysians.

== Incumbent political figures ==
=== Federal level ===
- Yang di-Pertuan Agong:
  - Sultan Abdul Halim Muadzam Shah (until 21 September)
  - Sultan Yahya Petra (from 21 September)
- Raja Permaisuri Agong:
  - Sultanah Bahiyah (until 21 September)
  - Raja Perempuan Zainab (from 21 September)
- Prime Minister: Abdul Razak Hussein
- Deputy Prime Minister: Hussein Onn
- Lord President: Mohamed Suffian Mohamed Hashim

=== State level ===
- Sultan of Johor: Sultan Ismail
- Sultan of Kedah: Tunku Abdul Malik (Regent until 21 September)
- Sultan of Kelantan: Tengku Ismail Petra (Regent from 21 September)
- Raja of Perlis: Tuanku Syed Putra
- Sultan of Perak: Sultan Idris Shah II
- Sultan of Pahang: Sultan Ahmad Shah (Deputy Yang di-Pertuan Agong)
- Sultan of Selangor: Sultan Salahuddin Abdul Aziz Shah
- Sultan of Terengganu: Sultan Ismail Nasiruddin Shah
- Yang di-Pertuan Besar of Negeri Sembilan: Tuanku Jaafar
- Yang di-Pertua Negeri (Governor) of Penang:
  - Tun Syed Sheikh Barabakh (until April)
  - Tun Sardon Jubir (from April)
- Yang di-Pertua Negeri (Governor) of Malacca:
  - Tun Haji Abdul Aziz bin Abdul Majid (until May)
  - Tun Syed Zahiruddin bin Syed Hassan (from May)
- Yang di-Pertua Negeri (Governor) of Sarawak: Tun Tuanku Bujang Tuanku Othman
- Yang di-Pertua Negeri (Governor) of Sabah:
  - Tun Fuad Stephens (until June)
  - Tun Mohd Hamdan Abdullah (from June)

== Events ==
- 18 February – Communist terrorists sabotaged the railway track which derailed the goods train at Rimba Mas near Padang Besar, Perlis.
- 1–15 March – The 3rd Hockey World Cup was held in Kuala Lumpur.
- 31 March – Communist terrorists staged a mortar attack on the Royal Malaysian Air Force base in Sempang Airport, Kuala Lumpur, damaging a Caribou light transport aircraft.
- 1 May – The 25th anniversary of Malaysian Trade Union Congress was celebrated.
- 17 May – Special Branch officer, Leong Ming Kong was assassinated by communist rebels in Langkap, Perak.
- 20 May – Communist terrorists killed police detective, Ong Teng Chin in Ipoh, Perak.
- June – The piling works for the Kompleks Tun Abdul Razak (KOMTAR) in Penang were completed.
- 19 June – Eight members of the security forces and three civilians were killed in an ambush by Communist terrorists in Kubang Pasu, Kedah.
- 30 June – World Heavyweight Champion, Muhammad Ali arrived in Malaysia for the boxing match against Joe Bugner.
- 1 July – World Heavyweight Champion, Muhammad Ali defeated Joe Bugner in a 15-round boxing match at Merdeka Stadium, Kuala Lumpur.
- 5 August – The AIA building hostage crisis occurred at AIA building in Kuala Lumpur, led by 5 members of the Japanese Red Army.
- 15 August – Communist terrorist fired rockets at the State Security Council's Military representative's house in Ipoh, Perak.
- 25 August – The International Women's Year was commemorated.
- 27 August – The Tugu Negara (National Monument) was bombed by communist terrorists.
- 3 September – Communist terrorists threw four hand grenades at the Police Field Force (PFF) Brigade headquarters at Jalan Pekeliling, Kuala Lumpur, killing two and injuring 51 PFF personnel.
- 21 September – Sultan Yahya Petra of Kelantan was elected as the sixth Yang di-Pertuan Agong.
- 22 September – The International Quran Recital Competition was held in Kuala Lumpur.
- 22 October – The 50th anniversary of the Rubber Research Institute of Malaysia was celebrated.
- 13 November – Tan Sri Khoo Chong Kong, a Perak state police chief was assassinated by the communist rebels in Ipoh, Perak.

== Births ==
- 1 April – Norshida Ibrahim, politician
- 23 June – Lee Kiat Lee, politician
- 28 June – Ning Baizura – Singer
- 23 October – Roslin Hashim – Badminton player
- 24 November – Lee Wan Wah – Badminton player (doubles)
- Unknown date – Abdul Malik Mydin – Solo swimmer

== Deaths ==
- 23 April – Walter Loh Poh Khan, MCA Member of Parliament for Selayang (b. 1930).
- 10 May – Abdul Aziz Abdul Majid, 3rd Yang di-Pertuan Negeri of Malacca (b. 1908).
- 11 June – Meor Samsudin Meor Yahya, former UMNO Member of Parliament for Sungai Perak Ulu (b. 1917).
- 26 June – Chik Mohamad Yusuf, 3rd Speaker of the Dewan Rakyat (b. 1907).
- 4 July – S. P. Seenivasagam, 3rd President of the People's Progressive Party and Member of the Dewan Negara (b. 1918).
- 8 October – Tun Syed Sheikh Barabakh, 3rd Yang di-Pertuan Negeri of Penang (b. 1906).
- 13 November – Tan Sri Khoo Chong Kong, Perak State police chief (b. 1925).

== See also ==
- 1975
- 1974 in Malaysia | 1976 in Malaysia
- History of Malaysia
