= 1974 in Malaysia =

- Decades: 1960s; 1970s; 1980s; 1990s
- See also: Other events of 1974; History of Malaysia • Timeline • Years

This article lists important figures and events in Malaysian public affairs during the year 1974, together with births and deaths of notable Malaysians.

== Incumbent political figures ==
=== Federal level ===
- Yang di-Pertuan Agong: Sultan Abdul Halim Muadzam Shah
- Raja Permaisuri Agong: Sultanah Bahiyah
- Prime Minister: Abdul Razak Hussein
- Deputy Prime Minister: Hussein Onn
- Lord President: Azmi Mohamed then Mohamed Suffian Mohamed Hashim

=== State level ===
- Sultan of Johor: Sultan Ismail
- Sultan of Kedah: Tengku Abdul Malik (Regent)
- Sultan of Kelantan: Sultan Yahya Petra (Deputy Yang di-Pertuan Agong)
- Raja of Perlis: Tuanku Syed Putra
- Sultan of Perak: Sultan Idris Shah II
- Sultan of Pahang:
  - Sultan Abu Bakar (until 7 May)
  - Sultan Ahmad Shah (from 7 May)
- Sultan of Selangor: Sultan Salahuddin Abdul Aziz Shah
- Sultan of Terengganu: Sultan Ismail Nasiruddin Shah
- Yang di-Pertuan Besar of Negeri Sembilan: Tuanku Jaafar
- Yang di-Pertua Negeri (Governor) of Penang: Tun Syed Sheikh Barabakh
- Yang di-Pertua Negeri (Governor) of Malacca: Tun Haji Abdul Aziz bin Abdul Majid
- Yang di-Pertua Negeri (Governor) of Sarawak: Tun Tuanku Bujang Tuanku Othman
- Yang di-Pertua Negeri (Governor) of Sabah: Tun Fuad Stephens

== Events ==
- 1 January – The first piling works for the KOMTAR building in Penang were undertaken.
- 3 January - Detective Police Constable Lau See Kaw was shot dead by communist gunmen at Malim Nawar, Perak.
- 10 January - Detective Police Constable Othman Bin Ahmad was ambushed by six criminals at a sugar cane plantation in Cuping, Perlis. He fought and killed one of the criminals. He was awarded the Seri Pahlawan Gagah Perkasa.
- 28 January – The 1974 Federal Territory of Kuala Lumpur Agreement was signed at Istana Negara, Kuala Lumpur by Yang di-Pertuan Agong Tuanku Abdul Halim Muadzam Shah and Sultan Salahuddin Abdul Aziz Shah of Selangor.
- 1 February – Kuala Lumpur became an independent Federal Territory. Previously, it had been part of the state of Selangor.
- 20 April - Detective Sergeant Lee Yoon Chin was shot dead by communist gunmens at Malacca.
- 27 April - Detective Police Constable Ong Soon Chua was shot dead by communist gunmens at Chemor, Perak.
- 25–27 April – The 7th Annual Meeting of the Board of Governors of the Asian Development Bank was held in Kuala Lumpur.
- 26 May – Communist Party of Malaya (CPM) assault group attacked and destroyed the equipment used in building the East-West Highway from Gerik, Perak to Jeli, Kelantan, delaying the completion of the project by two years.
- 28 May – Malaysia established diplomatic ties with the People's Republic of China. Prime Minister Tun Abdul Razak visited China for the first time and met Chairman Mao Zedong and Premier Zhou Enlai in Beijing.
- 1 June – Barisan Nasional (National Front) (BN), Malaysia's largest political party, was formed, replacing Parti Perikatan (Alliance Party).
- 7 June – Tan Sri Abdul Rahman Hashim, Inspector General of Police was assassinated by the communist rebels in Kuala Lumpur.
- 17 August – Petronas, the first Malaysian petroleum and gas company was founded.
- 24 August – The 1974 Malaysian General Elections.
- 1 September – The 25th anniversary of the National Electricity Board was celebrated.
- 1–16 September – Malaysia participated in the 1974 Asian Games in Tehran, Iran, taking one Silver and five Bronze medals.
- 23 September – Student unrest at the University of Malaya (UM).
- 9 October – The Centenary of the Universal Postal Union.
- 31 October – The 4th World Conference of Tin was held in Kuala Lumpur.
- 1 December – Bank Simpanan Nasional (National Savings Bank) (BSN) was founded.

== Births ==
- 20 January – Tengku Muhammad Faiz Petra – Tengku Mahkota (Crown Prince) of Kelantan
- 9 February – Erra Fazira – Beauty queen, model, singer and actress
- 10 August – Shamsilah Siru – Politician
- 20 September – Azman Ibrahim – Politician
- 25 October – T. Gopinath Naidu – Malaysian Footballer

== Deaths ==
- 5 May – Sultan Abu Bakar of Pahang
- 7 June – Tan Sri Abdul Rahman Hashim – Inspector General of Police

== See also ==
- 1974
- 1973 in Malaysia | 1975 in Malaysia
- History of Malaysia
