= 1971 in Malaysia =

- Decades: 1960s; 1970s; 1980s; 1990s
- See also: Other events of 1971; History of Malaysia • Timeline • Years

This article lists important figures and events in Malaysian public affairs during the year 1971, together with births and deaths of notable Malaysians. Parliamentary government was restored on 5 February, after its 1969 suspension due to race riots.

== Incumbent political figures ==
=== Federal level ===
- Yang di-Pertuan Agong: Sultan Abdul Halim Muadzam Shah
- Raja Permaisuri Agong: Sultanah Bahiyah
- Prime Minister: Tun Abdul Razak
- Deputy Prime Minister: Tun Dr Ismail
- Lord President: Azmi Mohamed

=== State level ===
- Sultan of Johor: Sultan Ismail
- Sultan of Kedah: Tunku Abdul Malik (Regent)
- Sultan of Kelantan: Sultan Yahya Petra (Deputy Yang di-Pertuan Agong)
- Raja of Perlis: Tuanku Syed Putra
- Sultan of Perak: Sultan Idris Shah II
- Sultan of Pahang: Sultan Abu Bakar
- Sultan of Selangor: Sultan Salahuddin Abdul Aziz Shah
- Sultan of Terengganu: Sultan Ismail Nasiruddin Shah
- Yang di-Pertuan Besar of Negeri Sembilan: Tuanku Jaafar
- Yang di-Pertua Negeri (Governor) of Penang: Tun Syed Sheh Barakbah
- Yang di-Pertua Negeri (Governor) of Malacca:
  - Tun Haji Abdul Malek bin Yusuf (until August)
  - Tun Haji Abdul Aziz bin Abdul Majid (from August)
- Yang di-Pertua Negeri (Governor) of Sarawak: Tun Tuanku Bujang Tuanku Othman
- Yang di-Pertua Negeri (Governor) of Sabah: Tun Pengiran Ahmad Raffae

== Events ==
- 5 January – Kuala Lumpur hit by flash floods. 22 people were killed.
- 5 February – The Parliament government was restored after it was suspended during the Incident of 13 May 1969.
- 20 February – Tuanku Abdul Halim Muadzam Shah of Kedah was installed as the fifth Yang di-Pertuan Agong.
- 28 March – The 25th anniversary of the installation of Raja Syed Putra as Raja Perlis was celebrated.
- 3 April – Malaysia Airlines Systems (MAS) was founded.
- 15-16 April – Malaysia, United Kingdom, Singapore, Australia, and New Zealand sign the Five Power Defence Arrangements. The agreement comes into effect on 1 November the same year.
- 15 May – Central Bank of Malaysia building officially opened.
- 11 July – The Malaysian New Economic Policy was launched.
- 9 September – The Star, a Malaysian newspaper, was founded.
- 13 September – The 17th Commonwealth Parliamentary Conference was held in Kuala Lumpur.
- December – Flash floods hit Temerloh, Pahang.
- 6–13 December – 1971 Southeast Asian Peninsular Games
- 16 December – The 25th anniversary of the installation of Sultan Ismail Nasiruddin Shah as Sultan of Terengganu was celebrated.

== Births ==
- 24 January – Rosman Alias – social media influencer
- 10 May – Amy Mastura – Malaysian singer and actress
- 4 June – Tengku Permaisuri Norashikin – former Radio Televisyen Malaysia (RTM) newscaster and current consort of Sultan Sharafuddin Idris Shah of Selangor
- 1 August – Rohani Abu Bakar – social media influencer
- 20 August – Hans Isaac – Malaysian entertainer
- 1 November – Azman Adnan – Malaysian footballer
- 18 November – Permaisuri Siti Aishah of Selangor and 11th Raja Permaisuri Agong
- 1 December – Jason Keng-Kwin Chan, Malaysian-Australian actor
- Unknown date – Wazi Abdul Hamid – Malaysian motorcycle cub prix rider

== Deaths ==
- 1 April – Mahmud Mat, 1st Menteri Besar of Pahang (b. 1894).
- 15 June – Nordin Ahmad, Malay film actor and director (b. 1929).
- 11 July – Hamzah Abdullah, 1st Menteri Besar of Selangor (b. 1890).

== See also ==
- 1971
- 1970 in Malaysia | 1972 in Malaysia
- History of Malaysia
