= 1972 in Malaysia =

- Decades: 1960s; 1970s; 1980s; 1990s
- See also: Other events of 1972; History of Malaysia • Timeline • Years

This article lists important figures and events in Malaysian public affairs during the year 1972, together with births and deaths of notable Malaysians.

== Incumbent political figures ==
=== Federal level ===
- Yang di-Pertuan Agong: Sultan Abdul Halim Muadzam Shah
- Raja Permaisuri Agong: Sultanah Bahiyah
- Prime Minister: Tun Abdul Razak
- Deputy Prime Minister: Tun Dr Ismail
- Lord President: Azmi Mohamed

=== State level ===
- Sultan of Johor: Sultan Ismail
- Sultan of Kedah: Tunku Abdul Malik (Regent)
- Sultan of Kelantan: Sultan Yahya Petra (Deputy Yang di-Pertuan Agong)
- Raja of Perlis: Tuanku Syed Putra
- Sultan of Perak: Sultan Idris Shah II
- Sultan of Pahang: Sultan Abu Bakar
- Sultan of Selangor: Sultan Salahuddin Abdul Aziz Shah
- Sultan of Terengganu: Sultan Ismail Nasiruddin Shah
- Yang di-Pertuan Besar of Negeri Sembilan: Tuanku Jaafar
- Yang di-Pertua Negeri (Governor) of Penang: Tun Syed Sheikh Barabakh
- Yang di-Pertua Negeri (Governor) of Malacca: Tun Haji Abdul Aziz bin Abdul Majid
- Yang di-Pertua Negeri (Governor) of Sarawak: Tun Tuanku Bujang Tuanku Othman
- Yang di-Pertua Negeri (Governor) of Sabah: Tun Pengiran Ahmad Raffae

== Events ==
- 31 January – Pacific Area Tourist Association Conference was held in Kuala Lumpur.
- 1 February – Kuala Lumpur was accorded city status. Tan Sri Dato' Lokman Yusof became the first Mayor of Kuala Lumpur (Datuk Bandar Kuala Lumpur).
- February – Queen Elizabeth II of the United Kingdom made her first official visit to Malaysia. She visited General Hospital at Kota Kinabalu. The hospital was then renamed in her honour (Hospital Queen Elizabeth). It is the only hospital in Malaysia named after her.
- March – Lee Kuan Yew's first visit to Malaysia after Singapore's separation from Malaysia on August 9 1965.
- 18 April – The Rajang Area Security Command (RASCOM) was established during the Sarawak Communist Insurgency.
- 19 June – TV Pendidikan, Malaysia's first and only educational TV network was officially launched.
- 2–11 August – Malaysia competed for the first time at the Summer Paralympics in Heidelberg, West Germany, with a team of four.
- 13 September – About 27 people were killed in a river ferry disaster on Kerian River at the Perak-Kedah border.

== Births ==
- 18 January – Eja (Siti Shahrizah bt Saifuddin) – Malaysian model and actress
- 26 February – Victor Wong – Malaysian Chinese singer
- 10 July – Rosnah Shirlin, Malaysian politician
- 27 July – Sheikh Muszaphar Shukor – first Malaysian angkasawan (Cosmonaut)
- 28 November – Kazim Elias – Malaysian preacher and Islamic consultant

== Deaths ==
- 15 April – Khaw Kai Boh, Deputy President of the Malaysian Chinese Association and former Minister for Housing and Local Government (b. 1918).
- 9 May – Sulaiman Mohamed Attas, UMNO Member of Parliament for Rembau–Tampin (b. 1912).
- 15 May – Tan Sri Dato' Lokman Yusof, 1st Mayor of Kuala Lumpur (b. 1910).
- 13 December – Abu Bakar Baginda, 8th Menteri Besar of Selangor (b. 1899).

== See also ==
- 1972
- 1971 in Malaysia | 1973 in Malaysia
- History of Malaysia
