= 1979 in Malaysia =

- Decades: 1960s; 1970s; 1980s; 1990s
- See also: Other events of 1979; History of Malaysia • Timeline • Years

This article lists important figures and events in Malaysian public affairs during the year 1979, together with births and deaths of notable Malaysians and Malaysia-related figures.

== Incumbent political figures ==
=== Federal level ===
- Yang di-Pertuan Agong:
  - Sultan Yahya Petra (until 29 March)
  - Sultan Ahmad Shah (from 29 March)
- Raja Permaisuri Agong:
  - Raja Perempuan Zainab (until 29 March)
  - Tengku Ampuan Afzan (from 29 March)
- Prime Minister: Hussein Onn
- Deputy Prime Minister: Mahathir Mohamad
- Lord President: Mohamed Suffian Mohamed Hashim

=== State level ===
- Sultan of Johor: Sultan Ismail
- Sultan of Kedah: Sultan Abdul Halim Muadzam Shah
- Sultan of Kelantan:
  - Tengku Ismail Petra (Regent until 29 March)
  - Sultan Ismail Petra (from 29 March)
- Raja of Perlis: Tuanku Syed Putra
- Sultan of Perak: Sultan Idris Shah II
- Sultan of Pahang: Tengku Abdullah (Regent from 29 March)
- Sultan of Selangor: Sultan Salahuddin Abdul Aziz Shah
- Sultan of Terengganu:
  - Sultan Ismail Nasiruddin Shah (until 20 September)
  - Sultan Mahmud Al-Muktafi Billah Shah (from 20 September)
- Yang di-Pertuan Besar of Negeri Sembilan: Tuanku Jaafar (Deputy Yang di-Pertuan Agong)
- Yang di-Pertua Negeri (Governor) of Penang: Tun Sardon Jubir
- Yang di-Pertua Negeri (Governor) of Malacca: Tun Syed Zahiruddin bin Syed Hassan
- Yang di-Pertua Negeri (Governor) of Sarawak: Tun Abang Muhammad Salahuddin
- Yang di-Pertua Negeri (Governor) of Sabah: Tun Mohd Adnan Robert

== Events ==
- January - Go-slow at Subang Airport.
- February – Malaysian Industrial Development Authority (MIDA) was established.
- 29 March – Sultan Yahya Petra ibni Almarhum Sultan Ibrahim Petra of Kelantan and the Yang di-Pertuan Agong died. His body was brought back to Kelantan and laid to rest at Kelantan Royal Mausoleum, Langgar, Kota Bharu.
- 26 April – Sultan Ahmad Shah of Pahang was elected as the seventh Yang di-Pertuan Agong.
- April – Matsushita Electric Industrial Co., Ltd. of Japan opened its factories in Shah Alam, Selangor.
- 7 May – RTM2 commenced colour television broadcasts.
- 22 May – The Amanah Saham Nasional Berhad was founded
- 5 September – Establishment of Sekolah Menengah Sains Sultan Mahmud
- September – Opening of the Karak Highway and Genting Sempah Tunnel.

== Births ==
- 11 January – Siti Nurhaliza – Singer
- 5 April – Nisha Ayub – transgender rights activist
- 30 May – Que Haidar – Actor
- 30 May – Hardi Jaafar – footballer
- 2 June – Siti Zalina Ahmad – Lawn bowler
- 9 July – Gary Chaw – singer-songwriter
- 24 September – Shukor Adan – footballer
- 29 September – Hairuddin Omar – footballer
- 30 September – Vince Chong – Reality TV Star
- 29 October – Maya Karin – Singer and actress
- 11 November – Farah Asyikin Zulkifli – Singer, songwriter of Malaysian Idol S2 and One in a Million (season 1)

== Deaths ==
- 8 March – Ibrahim Yaacob, founder of the Kesatuan Melayu Muda (b. 1911).
- 29 March – Yahya Petra of Kelantan, 27th Sultan of Kelantan and 6th Yang di-Pertuan Agong of Malaysia (b. 1917).
- 30 March – E. E. C. Thuraisingham, 1st local Member (Minister) for Education in the Communities Liaison Committee (b. 1898).
- 27 April – Shariff Dol, Malay film actor (b. 1926).
- 18 May – Tun V. T. Sambanthan, 5th President of the Malaysian Indian Congress and former Minister of Works, Posts and Telecommunications (b. 1919).
- 20 September – Ismail Nasir Shah of Terengganu, 16th Sultan of Terengganu and 4th Yang di-Pertuan Agong of Malaysia (b. 1907).
- 12 October – V. Manickavasagam, 6th President of the Malaysian Indian Congress (b. 1926).
- 25 October – Gerald Templer, 3rd British High Commissioner for Malaya (b. 1898).
- 18 November – Dato Wong Shee Fun, founding member of the Malaysian Chinese Association and the Johor State Branch of the Malaysian Chinese Association (b. 1898).

== See also ==
- History of Malaysia
