= 1978 in Malaysia =

- Decades: 1960s; 1970s; 1980s; 1990s
- See also: Other events of 1978; History of Malaysia • Timeline • Years

This article lists important figures and events in Malaysian public affairs during the year 1978, together with births and deaths of notable Malaysians.

== Incumbent political figures ==
=== Federal level ===
- Yang di-Pertuan Agong: Sultan Yahya Petra
- Raja Permaisuri Agong: Raja Perempuan Zainab
- Prime Minister: Hussein Onn
- Deputy Prime Minister: Mahathir Mohamad
- Lord President: Mohamed Suffian Mohamed Hashim

=== State level ===
- Sultan of Johor: Sultan Ismail
- Sultan of Kedah: Sultan Abdul Halim Muadzam Shah
- Sultan of Kelantan: Tengku Ismail Petra (Regent)
- Raja of Perlis: Tuanku Syed Putra
- Sultan of Perak: Sultan Idris Shah II
- Sultan of Pahang: Sultan Ahmad Shah (Deputy Yang di-Pertuan Agong)
- Sultan of Selangor: Sultan Salahuddin Abdul Aziz Shah
- Sultan of Terengganu: Sultan Ismail Nasiruddin Shah
- Yang di-Pertuan Besar of Negeri Sembilan: Tuanku Jaafar
- Yang di-Pertua Negeri (Governor) of Penang: Tun Sardon Jubir
- Yang di-Pertua Negeri (Governor) of Malacca: Tun Syed Zahiruddin bin Syed Hassan
- Yang di-Pertua Negeri (Governor) of Sarawak: Tun Abang Muhammad Salahuddin
- Yang di-Pertua Negeri (Governor) of Sabah:
  - Tun Datuk Ahmad Koroh (until November)
  - Tun Mohd Adnan Robert (from November)

== Events ==
- 8 July – 1978 Malaysian General Elections
- 7 December – Shah Alam became the capital of Selangor
- 28 December – Colour television was introduced by Radio Television Malaysia on RTM1

== Births ==
- 3 January - Erry Putra - Singer, actor
- 28 March – Shalin Zulkifli – Bowling queen
- 18 April – Fazley Yaakob – celebrity chef
- 13 June – Faizal Yusof – Malaysian actor (died 2011)
- 6 July – Daphne Iking – Celebrity
- 4 December – Jaclyn Victor – Singer and winner of Malaysian Idol (season 1)

== Deaths ==
- 25 February – Ahmad Tuan Hussien, islamic religious teacher and former PAS Member of Parliament for Krian (b. 1906).
- 6 March – K. L. Devaser, 4th President of the Malaysian Indian Congress (b. 1912).
- 8 March – Ngau Ken Lock, MCA Member of the Dewan Negara (b. 1912).
- 12 April – Wee Kheng Chiang, businessman and founder of United Overseas Bank and CIMB (b. 1890).
- 28 May – Chan Kwong Hon, MCA Member of the Dewan Negara (b. 1908).
- 25 June – Ahmad Koroh, 5th Yang di-Pertuan Negeri of Sabah (b. 1925).
- 8 November – Abdul Kadir Shamsuddin, 4th Chief Secretary to the Government of Malaysia (b. 1920).

== See also ==
- 1978
- 1977 in Malaysia | 1979 in Malaysia
- History of Malaysia
