= 1977 in Malaysia =

- Decades: 1960s; 1970s; 1980s; 1990s
- See also: Other events of 1977; History of Malaysia • Timeline • Years

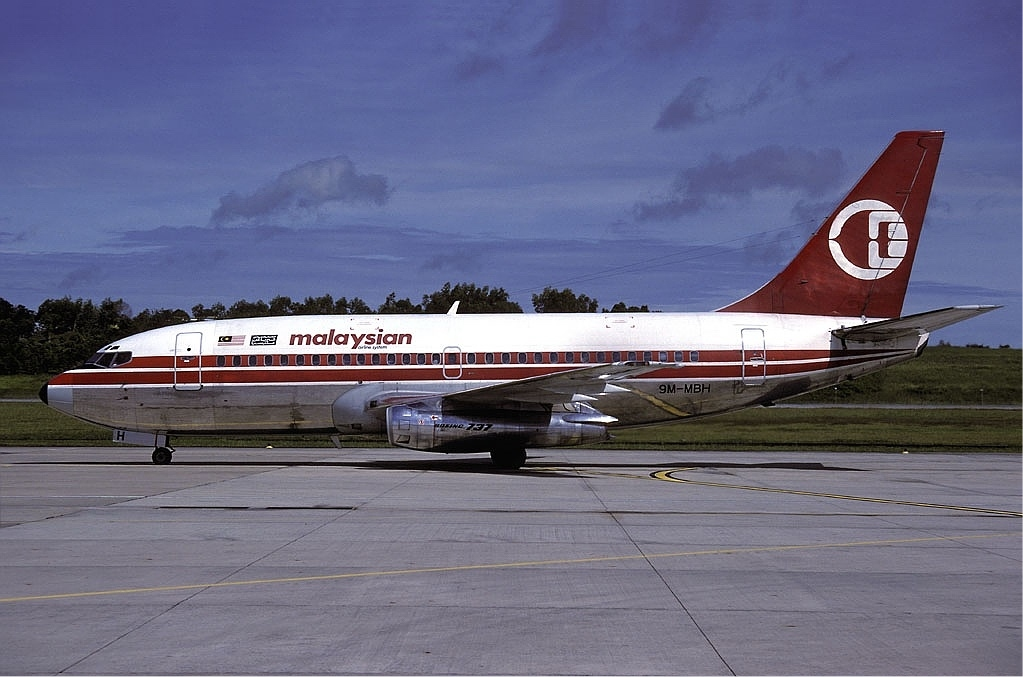
The Boeing 737-200 of the Malaysian Airline System Flight 653 is hijacked and crashes in Tanjung Kupang, Johor, killing all 100 on board.

This article lists important figures and events in Malaysian public affairs during the year 1977, together with births and deaths of notable Malaysians. MAS Flight 653 was hijacked and crashed in Johor on 16 December, killing 100 people.

== Incumbent political figures ==
=== Federal level ===
- Yang di-Pertuan Agong: Sultan Yahya Petra
- Raja Permaisuri Agong: Raja Perempuan Zainab
- Prime Minister: Hussein Onn
- Deputy Prime Minister: Mahathir Mohamad
- Lord President: Mohamed Suffian Mohamed Hashim

=== State level ===
- Sultan of Johor: Sultan Ismail
- Sultan of Kedah: Sultan Abdul Halim Muadzam Shah
- Sultan of Kelantan: Tengku Ismail Petra (Regent)
- Raja of Perlis: Tuanku Syed Putra
- Sultan of Perak: Sultan Idris Shah II
- Sultan of Pahang: Sultan Ahmad Shah (Deputy Yang di-Pertuan Agong)
- Sultan of Selangor: Sultan Salahuddin Abdul Aziz Shah
- Sultan of Terengganu: Sultan Ismail Nasiruddin Shah
- Yang di-Pertuan Besar of Negeri Sembilan: Tuanku Jaafar
- Yang di-Pertua Negeri (Governor) of Penang: Tun Sardon Jubir
- Yang di-Pertua Negeri (Governor) of Malacca: Tun Syed Zahiruddin bin Syed Hassan
- Yang di-Pertua Negeri (Governor) of Sarawak:
  - Tun Tuanku Bujang Tuanku Othman (until February)
  - Tun Abang Muhammad Salahuddin (from February)
- Yang di-Pertua Negeri (Governor) of Sabah:
  - Tun Mohd Hamdan Abdullah (Until November)
  - Tun Datuk Ahmad Koroh (From November)

== Events ==
- 24 January – Former Selangor Menteri Besar, Datuk Harun Idris was found guilty and sentenced by the High Court to six months jail for forgery and fined RM 15,000 or six months jail for abetting criminal breach of trust involving nearly RM 6.5 million worth of Bank Rakyat's stocks and shares
- 1 February test colour by RTM
- 24 April – Five children were killed in a saloon racing car accident at the Batu Tiga Circuit during the Malaysian Grand Prix.
- 11 May – The Tugu Negara (National Monument) was finally repaired and restored to its original state.
- June – Construction began on the North–South Expressway project.
- 7 July – The 25th anniversary of Federal Land Development Authority (FELDA) was celebrated.
- 8 August – The 10th anniversary of Association of Southeast Asian Nations (ASEAN) was celebrated.
- 15 August – Communist Party of Malaya (CPM) assault group launched an ambush on the East–West Highway from Gerik, Perak to Jeli, Kelantan. Five soldiers from the 11th Battalion of the Askar Wataniah (Territorial Army) were ambushed by 30 Communist terrorists during left Post 8 for Post 5 on patrol and to obtain supplies.
- 27 September – Japan Airlines Flight 715 crashed at Subang, Selangor, killing 34 of the 79 people on board.
- 8 November – A State of emergency was declared in the state of Kelantan following a political impasse and street violence.
- 19–26 November – The 1977 Southeast Asian Games were held in Kuala Lumpur.
- 4 December – Malaysian Airline System Flight 653 was hijacked and crashed in Tanjung Kupang, Johor, killing all 100 people on board.

== Births ==
- 17 February – Wong Choong Hann – Badminton player
- Unknown date – Azmyl Yunor – Singer-songwriter

== Deaths ==
- 14 January – Tan Sri Syed Jaabar Albar, 6th Youth Chief of the United Malays National Organisation (b. 1914)
- 6 July – Tun Abdul Malek Yusuf, 2nd Yang di-pertua Negeri of Malacca (b. 1899)
- 13 August – Lim Swee Aun, former Vice-President of the Malayan Chinese Association (b. 1915)
- 10 October – Tun Mohd Hamdan Abdullah, 4th Yang di-Pertua Negeri of Sabah (b. 1922)
- 29 October – Talib Karim, 3rd Chief Minister of Malacca (b. 1911)
- 4 December – Dato' Ali Ahmad, 5th Minister of Agriculture and Rural Development (b. 1930)
- 20 December – Tan Sri Nik Ahmad Kamil Nik Mahmud, 4th Speaker of the Dewan Rakyat (b. 1909)

== See also ==
- 1977
- 1976 in Malaysia | 1978 in Malaysia
- History of Malaysia
