= 1973 in Malaysia =

- Decades: 1960s; 1970s; 1980s; 1990s
- See also: Other events of 1973; History of Malaysia • Timeline • Years

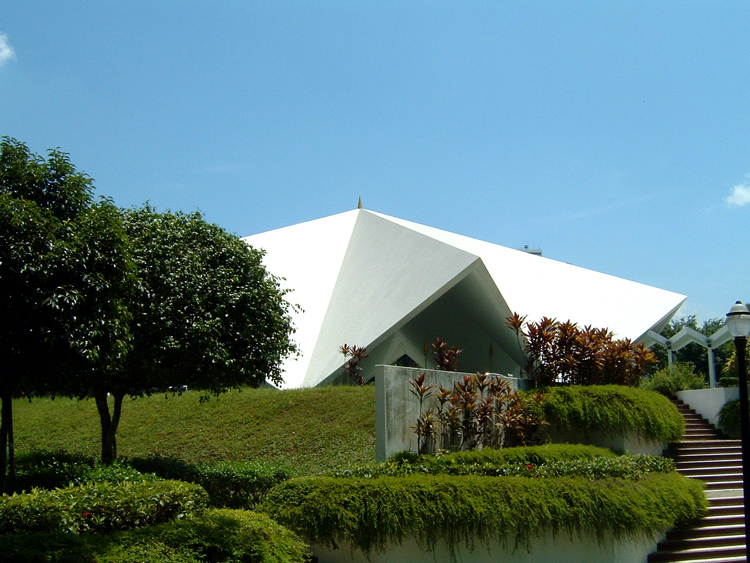
Makam Pahlawan, near Masjid Negara, Kuala Lumpur, where Malaysian leaders are buried.

This article lists important figures and events in Malaysian public affairs during the year 1973, together with births and deaths of notable Malaysians.

== Incumbent political figures ==
=== Federal level ===
- Yang di-Pertuan Agong: Sultan Abdul Halim Muadzam Shah
- Raja Permaisuri Agong: Sultanah Bahiyah
- Prime Minister: Abdul Razak Hussein
- Deputy Prime Minister:
  - Tun Dr Ismail (until 2 August)
  - Hussein Onn (from 3 August)
- Lord President: Azmi Mohamed

=== State level ===
- Sultan of Johor: Sultan Ismail
- Sultan of Kedah: Tunku Abdul Malik (Regent)
- Sultan of Kelantan: Sultan Yahya Petra (Deputy Yang di-Pertuan Agong)
- Raja of Perlis: Tuanku Syed Putra
- Sultan of Perak: Sultan Idris Shah II
- Sultan of Pahang: Sultan Abu Bakar
- Sultan of Selangor: Sultan Salahuddin Abdul Aziz Shah
- Sultan of Terengganu: Sultan Ismail Nasiruddin Shah
- Yang di-Pertuan Besar of Negeri Sembilan: Tuanku Jaafar
- Yang di-Pertua Negeri (Governor) of Penang: Tun Syed Sheikh Barabakh
- Yang di-Pertua Negeri (Governor) of Malacca: Tun Haji Abdul Aziz bin Abdul Majid
- Yang di-Pertua Negeri (Governor) of Sarawak: Tun Tuanku Bujang Tuanku Othman
- Yang di-Pertua Negeri (Governor) of Sabah:
  - Tun Pengiran Ahmad Raffae (until March)
  - Tun Fuad Stephens (from March)

== Events ==
- 30 Jan - A.R. tompel, Actor and Director died at 54 after hit by car at Setapak.
- February – KFC Malaysia opened its first restaurant at Jalan Tuanku Abdul Rahman, Kuala Lumpur.
- 7–8 February – A Malay farmer Idrus bin Hassan killed eight people and wounded four others in Batu Titian Akar near Rembau, Negeri Sembilan, before being shot dead by police.
- 21 May – Official opening of the Rantau Panjang – Sungai Golok Bridge of Malaysia-Thailand border in Kelantan.
- 29 May – P. Ramlee, singer and actor, died at the age of 44 from a heart attack. He was buried at Jalan Ampang Muslim Cemetery, Kuala Lumpur.
- 2 July – Social Security Organisation (SOCSO) established.
- 22 June - A grenade exploded on a Butterworth-bound train pulling into the Batu Gajah railway station, killing 2, including a soldier and injuring 11.
- 6 July – Official opening of the Kuala Lumpur Hilton by Prime Minister Tun Abdul Razak.
- 1 August – The 25th anniversary of the World Health Organization (WHO) was celebrated.
- 2 August – Tun Dr Ismail the deputy prime minister died due to heart attack. He was buried in Makam Pahlawan, near Masjid Negara, Kuala Lumpur. He was the first national leader to be buried here.
- 15 September – The 50th anniversary of the International Criminal Police Organization (Interpol) was celebrated.
- 1 October – Malaysia Airline System was established.
- 18 October – 42 people, mostly Indians, were crushed to death when a 200-foot-long limestone slab fell off a cliff, collapsed and crashed onto a village at Gunung Cheroh, Ipoh, Perak.
- 21 October – A peace declaration was signed between the Malaysian government and the North Kalimantan Communist Party (NKCP) at Simanggang, Sarawak. After the signing, the district and division of Simanggang were later renamed Sri Aman ("town of peace").
- 22 October -Detective Sergeant Chong Kek Oh was shot dead by communist gunmens at Sungai Siput, Perak.
- 27 December - M.V Pulau Kidjang. Sarawak's worst maritime tragedies. Sarawak Titanic

== Births ==
- 22 March – Tuanku Zara Salim Davidson, Raja Permaisuri of Perak
- 22 August – Roslina Bakar, sport shooter
- Unknown date – Angie Cheung, Malaysian actress and former Miss Chinese Malaysia

== Deaths ==
- 30 Jan - Aman Ramlie bin Jaafar, Actor, Director, Comedian
- 8 April – Tengku Ampuan Jemaah of Selangor, Second Raja Permaisuri Agong
- 29 May – Tan Sri P. Ramlee, actor, singer, director, musician
- 2 August – Tun Dr. Ismail Abdul Rahman, 2nd Deputy Prime Minister of Malaysia
- 23 October – Tan Sri Zainal Abidin Ahmad (Za'aba), Malay writer and linguist

== See also ==
- 1972 in Malaysia | 1974 in Malaysia
- History of Malaysia
