= 1980 in Malaysia =

- Decades: 1960s; 1970s; 1980s; 1990s; 2000s
- See also: Other events of 1980; History of Malaysia • Timeline • Years

This article lists important figures and events in Malaysian public affairs during the year 1980, together with births and deaths of notable Malaysians.

== Incumbent political figures ==
=== Federal level ===
- Yang di-Pertuan Agong: Sultan Ahmad Shah
- Raja Permaisuri Agong: Tengku Ampuan Afzan
- Prime Minister: Hussein Onn
- Deputy Prime Minister: Mahathir Mohamad
- Lord President: Mohamed Suffian Mohamed Hashim

=== State level ===
- Sultan of Johor: Sultan Ismail
- Sultan of Kedah: Sultan Abdul Halim Muadzam Shah
- Sultan of Kelantan: Sultan Ismail Petra
- Raja of Perlis: Tuanku Syed Putra
- Sultan of Perak: Sultan Idris Shah II
- Sultan of Pahang: Tengku Abdullah (Regent)
- Sultan of Selangor: Sultan Salahuddin Abdul Aziz Shah
- Sultan of Terengganu: Sultan Mahmud Al-Muktafi Billah Shah
- Yang di-Pertuan Besar of Negeri Sembilan: Tuanku Jaafar
- Yang di-Pertua Negeri (Governor) of Penang: Tun Sardon Jubir
- Yang di-Pertua Negeri (Governor) of Malacca: Tun Syed Zahiruddin bin Syed Hassan
- Yang di-Pertua Negeri (Governor) of Sarawak: Tun Abang Muhammad Salahuddin
- Yang di-Pertua Negeri (Governor) of Sabah: Tun Mohd Adnan Robert

== Events ==
- February – Johore Safari World, Malaysia's first safari park was opened to public.
- 30 March – Sultan Ismail Petra was crowned as the Sultan of Kelantan
- 5 June – 8 died in the powerful explosions and fire inferno at Port Klang, Selangor.
- 10 July – Sultan Ahmad Shah of Pahang was installed as seventh Yang di-Pertuan Agong.
- 19 July – Malaysia boycotted the 1980 Moscow Olympic Games in Soviet Union.
- 31 August – Colour television launched in Sabah and Sarawak by Radio Televisyen Malaysia (RTM)
- September – The Heavy Industries Corporation of Malaysia Berhad (HICOM) was established.
- 24 October – The Malaysian Highway Authority was founded.

== Births ==
- 15 January – Qabil Ambak – Equestrian
- 2 February – Josiah Ng – Track cyclist
- 1 July – Mizz Nina, Malaysian fashion designer
- 29 August – Lim Keng Liat – Swimmer
- 15 September – Faiz Khaleed – first Malaysian astronaut

== Death ==
- 20 February – Udo Omar – Malay film actor, known for his role as 'Haji Bakhil' in P. Ramlee's film Labu dan Labi (1962)

== See also ==
- 1979
- 1979 in Malaysia | 1981 in Malaysia
- History of Malaysia
