= 1981 in Malaysia =

- Decades: 1960s; 1970s; 1980s; 1990s; 2000s
- See also: Other events of 1981; History of Malaysia • Timeline • Years

This article lists important figures and events in Malaysian public affairs during the year 1981, together with births and deaths of notable Malaysians.

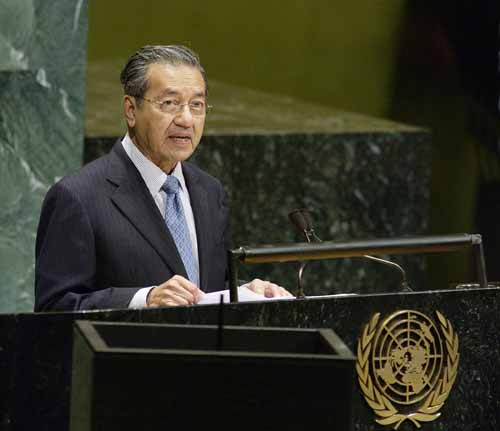
Tun Dr Mahathir Mohamad became Malaysia's fourth Prime Minister on 17 July

== Incumbent political figures ==
=== Federal level ===
- Yang di-Pertuan Agong: Sultan Ahmad Shah
- Raja Permaisuri Agong: Tengku Ampuan Afzan
- Prime Minister:
  - Hussein Onn (until 16 July)
  - Mahathir Mohamad (from 17 July)
- Deputy Prime Minister: Dato' Musa Hitam
- Lord President: Mohamed Suffian Mohamed Hashim

=== State level ===
- Sultan of Johor:
  - Sultan Ismail (until 10 May)
  - Sultan Iskandar (from 11 May)
- Sultan of Kedah: Sultan Abdul Halim Muadzam Shah
- Sultan of Kelantan: Sultan Ismail Petra
- Raja of Perlis: Tuanku Syed Putra
- Sultan of Perak: Sultan Idris Shah II
- Sultan of Pahang: Tengku Abdullah (Regent)
- Sultan of Selangor: Sultan Salahuddin Abdul Aziz Shah
- Sultan of Terengganu: Sultan Mahmud Al-Muktafi Billah Shah
- Yang di-Pertuan Besar of Negeri Sembilan: Tuanku Jaafar (Deputy Yang di-Pertuan Agong)
- Yang di-Pertua Negeri (Governor) of Penang:
  - Tun Sardon Jubir (until May)
  - Tun Dr Awang Hassan (from May)
- Yang di-Pertua Negeri (Governor) of Malacca: Tun Syed Zahiruddin bin Syed Hassan
- Yang di-Pertua Negeri (Governor) of Sarawak:
  - Tun Abang Muhammad Salahuddin (until February)
  - Tun Abdul Rahman Ya'kub (from February)
- Yang di-Pertua Negeri (Governor) of Sabah: Tun Mohd Adnan Robert

== Events ==
- 20 April – The Amanah Saham Nasional scheme was launched.
- 10 May – Sultan Ismail Al-Khalidi of Johor died at the age of 86. He was buried at the Mahmoodiah Royal Mausoleum in Johor Bahru. His son, Tunku Mahmood Iskandar was proclaimed as the 24th Sultan of Johor and 4th in the modern Sultan of Johor.
- 3 June – Soldier Kanang anak Langkau was awarded the Seri Pahlawan Gagah Perkasa (SP) from the Yang di-Pertuan Agong, Sultan Ahmad Shah of Pahang for his bravery and sacrifice for fighting against Communist terrorists during the Insurgency.
- June – The new Amanah Saham Nasional Berhad building at Jalan Tun Razak, Kuala Lumpur was officially opened.
- 11 June – Wong Swee Chin, known as Botak Chin was executed by hanging at Pudu Prison, Kuala Lumpur.
- 16 July – Hussein Onn resigned as prime minister due to ill health. Mahathir Mohamad became the fourth Malaysian prime minister.
- 18 July – Tun Musa Hitam was appointed Deputy Prime Minister.
- 23 July – Work Minister S. Samy Vellu announced that the Penang Bridge, Penang would be constructed using the cable-stayed concrete girder method of the San Francisco Golden Gate Bridge instead of the steel-tied arch in the style of the Sydney Harbour Bridge.
- 9 August – Chinese Premier Zhao Ziyang visited Malaysia and met with Prime Minister Mahathir Mohamad.
- 7 September – Permodalan Nasional Berhad leads a "Dawn Raid" on the London Stock Exchange with 51 per cent of Guthrie shares acquired in just 10 minutes.
- 17 September – The new Rajang Area Security Command (RASCOM) headquarters was officially opened in Sibu, Sarawak.
- 11 October – A Malay rubber tapper named Jaafar Patola killed six people and wounded 25 others in Parit Setan, a village near Benut, Johor before being shot dead by police.

== Births ==
- 24 January – Lynn Leong – Squash player
- 25 August – Mawi – Singer
- 2 September – Indra Putra Mahayuddin – Footballer
- 11 November – Wong Pei Tty – Badminton player (doubles)
- 29 November – Nicholas Teo – Malaysian Chinese singer
- 12 December – Akmal Rizal Ahmad Rakhli – Footballer

== Deaths ==
- 7 April – H. M. Busra – Malay film actor
- 10 May – Sultan Ismail of Johor
- 11 June – Botak Chin – Malaysian criminal and gangster
- 8 July – Temenggong Jugah Anak Barieng – first Sarawak minister in federal cabinet

== See also ==
- 1981
- 1980 in Malaysia | 1982 in Malaysia
- History of Malaysia
