= 1982 in Malaysia =

- Decades: 1960s; 1970s; 1980s; 1990s; 2000s
- See also: Other events of 1982; History of Malaysia • Timeline • Years

This article lists important figures and events in Malaysian public affairs during the year 1982, together with births and deaths of notable Malaysians.

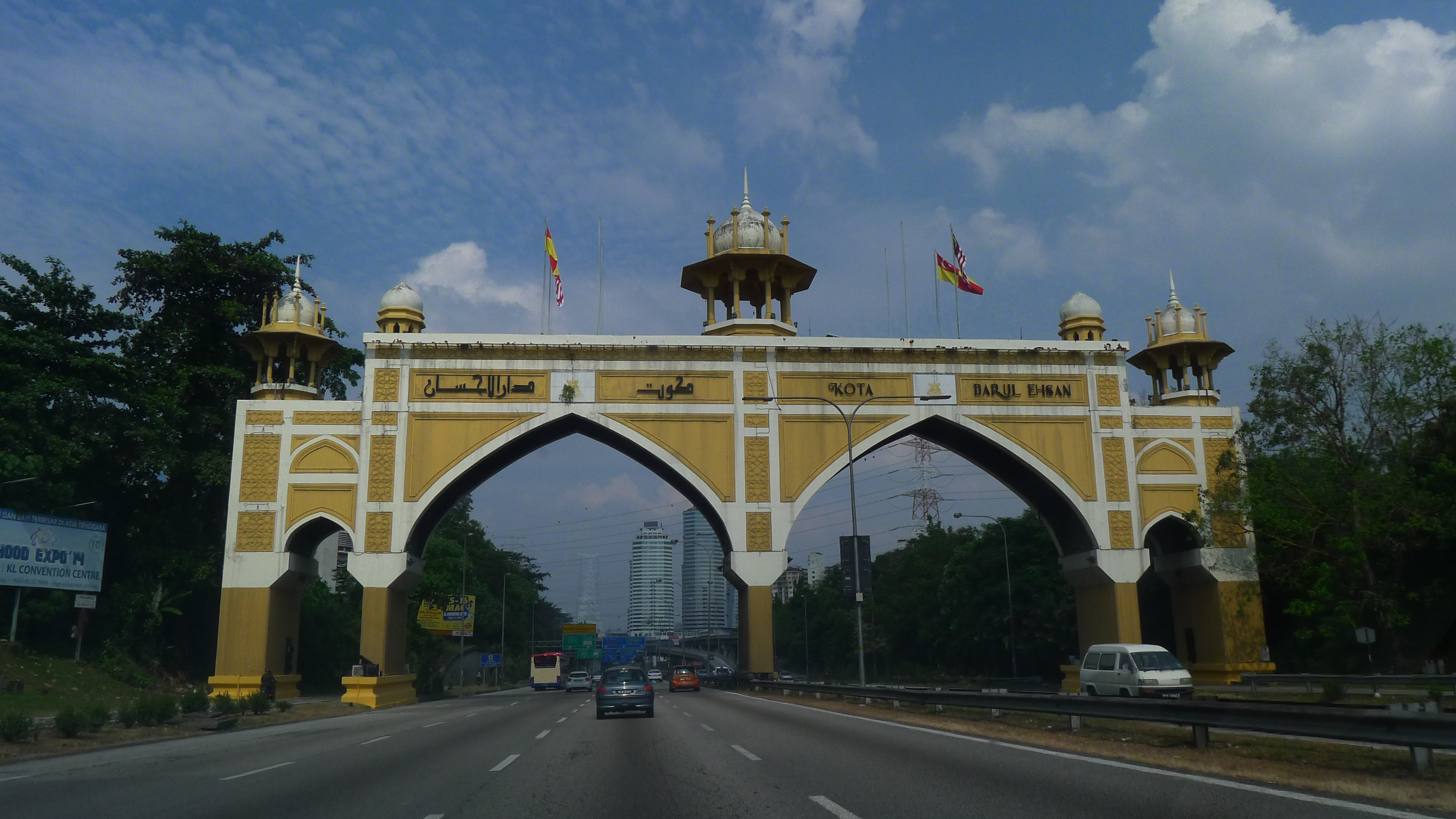
The Kota Darul Ehsan arch.

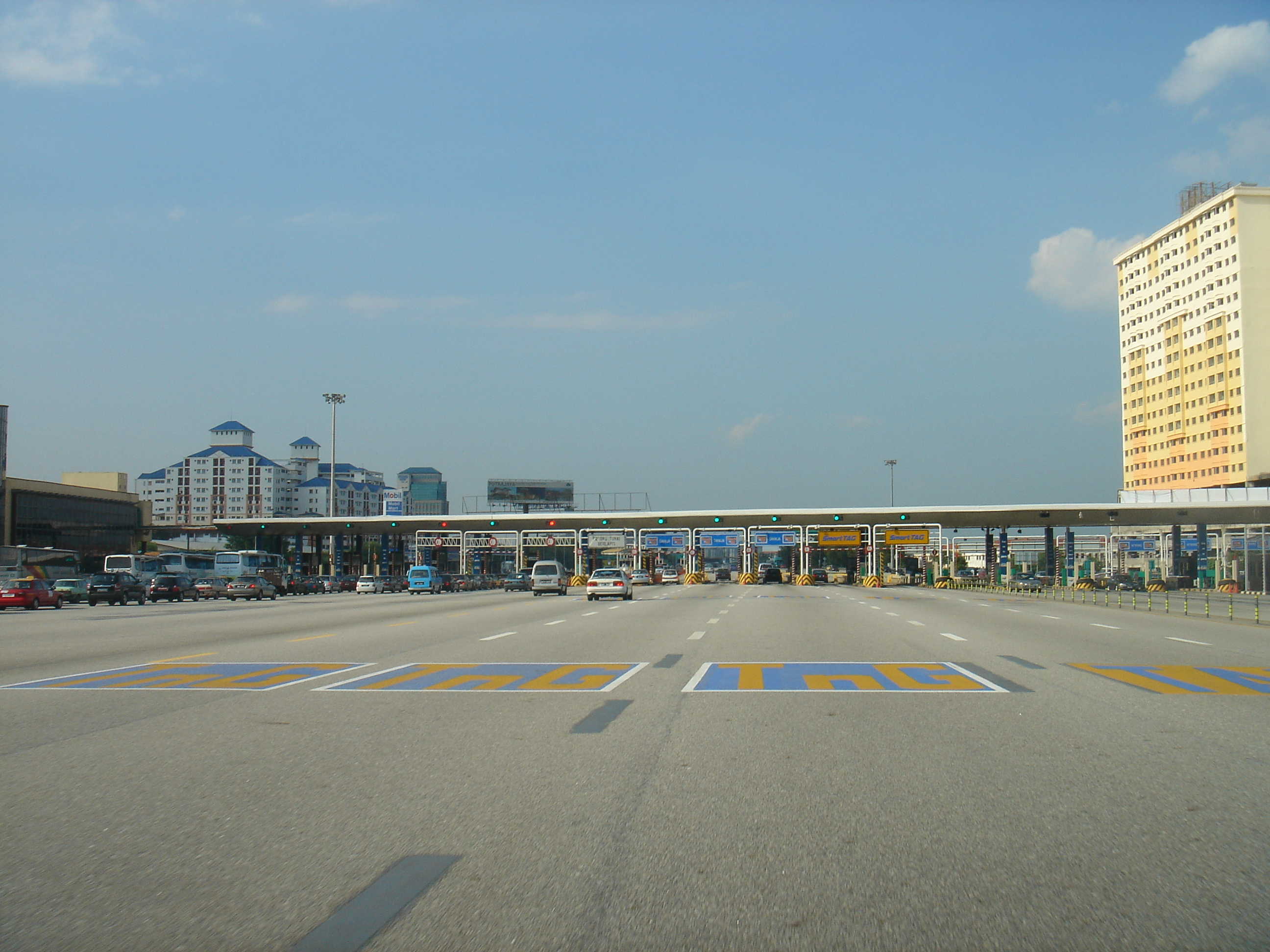
Sungai Besi toll plaza on the Kuala Lumpur–Seremban Expressway.

== Incumbent political figures ==
=== Federal level ===
- Yang di-Pertuan Agong: Sultan Ahmad Shah of Pahang
- Raja Permaisuri Agong: Tengku Ampuan Afzan of Pahang
- Prime Minister: Dato' Sri Dr Mahathir Mohamad
- Deputy Prime Minister: Dato' Musa Hitam
- Lord President: Mohamed Suffian Mohamed Hashim then Azlan Shah

=== State level ===
- Sultan of Johor: Sultan Iskandar
- Sultan of Kedah: Sultan Abdul Halim Muadzam Shah
- Sultan of Kelantan: Sultan Ismail Petra
- Raja of Perlis: Tuanku Syed Putra
- Sultan of Perak: Sultan Idris Shah II
- Sultan of Pahang: Tengku Abdullah (Regent)
- Sultan of Selangor: Sultan Salahuddin Abdul Aziz Shah
- Sultan of Terengganu: Sultan Mahmud Al-Muktafi Billah Shah
- Yang di-Pertuan Besar of Negeri Sembilan: Tuanku Jaafar (Deputy Yang di-Pertuan Agong)
- Yang di-Pertua Negeri (Governor) of Penang: Tun Dr Awang Hassan
- Yang di-Pertua Negeri (Governor) of Malacca: Tun Syed Zahiruddin bin Syed Hassan
- Yang di-Pertua Negeri (Governor) of Sarawak: Tun Abdul Rahman Ya'kub
- Yang di-Pertua Negeri (Governor) of Sabah: Tun Mohd Adnan Robert

== Events ==
- 1 January – The time zone in Peninsular Malaysia and Singapore changed to GMT+08:00, and it has not changed since.
- 1 January – The metric system of weights and measurements was introduced to replace the British imperial systems.
- 2 January – The clock-in punchcard system for civil servants begins.
- 3 January – Kota Darul Ehsan, the biggest arch in Malaysia was opened.
- 10 January – The former Defence Minister, Tan Sri Ghazalie Shafie survived a plane crash.
- February – The construction of the Penang Bridge projects began.
- 1 February – Official opening of the Bandar Tun Razak (formerly Kampung Konggo) by the Prime Minister, Mahathir Mohamad in conjunction with the 10th anniversary of the Federal Territory of Kuala Lumpur.
- 13 February – The first section of the North–South Expressway, Kuala Lumpur–Seremban Expressway toll sections from Sungai Besi to Labu was opened to traffic.
- 16 February – A measure of speed is essayed, with the Poslaju service to Singapore.
- March – The second version of Malaysian Ringgit RM 1 notes was introduced.
- April – The 1982 Malaysian General Elections. The State Assemblyman for Tampin, Negeri Sembilan, Datuk Mohd Taha Talib was found murdered. The Culture, Youth and Sports Minister Mokhtar Hashim was arrested and later convicted in connection with the murder.
- 29 April – McDonald's Malaysia opened its first restaurant at Jalan Bukit Bintang, Kuala Lumpur.
- 3 June – Deputy Prime Minister Musa Hitam declares he will take a $1,000 pay cut.
- 1 July – Official opening of the East–West Highway from Gerik, Perak to Jeli, Kelantan.
- 31 August – Malaysia celebrated its Silver Jubilee after 25 years of independence

== Births ==
- 10 January – Quincy Tan – Malaysian Chinese singer-songwriter
- 12 January – Nik Nazmi Nik Ahmad – Politician and writer
- 18 June – Chin Eei Hui – Badminton player (doubles)
- 1 July – Daniel Lee Chee Hun – Malaysian Chinese singer
- 13 September – Hafiz Hashim – Badminton player
- 21 October – Lee Chong Wei – Badminton player
- 24 October – Mohamed Fairuz Fauzy – Malaysian A1GP driver

== Deaths ==
- 16 March – Tun Syed Nasir Ismail, 5th Speaker of the Dewan Rakyat (b. 1921).
- 11 December – Mohamed Ghazali bin Jawi, 2nd & 6th Menteri Besar of Perak (b. 1924).

=== Dates unknown ===
- Khadijah Sidek, Malay nationalist and politician (b. 1918).
- Sulaiman Bulon, former Alliance Party Member of Parliament for Bagan Datuk (b. 1923).

== See also ==
- 1982
- 1981 in Malaysia | 1983 in Malaysia
- History of Malaysia
