= Public Prosecutor v Khong Teng Khen =

Constitutional law case in Malaysia

Public Prosecutor v Khong Teng Khen & Anor (1976) 2 MLJ 166 is a case concerning constitutional law in Malaysia. In Khong Teng Khen, it was held by the Federal Court that the Essential (Special Cases) Regulations 1975 (ESCAR) was in line with and valid under the Constitution of Malaysia. The case was heard by Lord President of the Federal Court Mohamed Suffian Mohamed Hashim and Federal Justice Wan Sulaiman, who were in the majority, with Federal Justice Ong Hock Sim who dissented.

== Background ==
The accused had been charged with possessing firearms and ammunition in a security area proclaimed by the government, in violation of section 57(1) of the Internal Security Act (ISA). After a preliminary inquiry, the case was committed to trial in the High Court.

The Attorney General later certified the accused as fit and proper persons to be tried under the special rules of evidence of the ESCAR. The counsel for the accused submitted that the trial should follow the ordinary rules of evidence of the Criminal Procedure Code instead of the ESCAR, claiming that the ESCAR was unconstitutional because it was a regulation promulgated by the Yang di-Pertuan Agong (King) after a new session of Parliament had convened. This was an alleged contravention of Article 150 of the Constitution.

To address this question of constitutional law, the trial judge referred the matter to the Federal Court.

=== ESCAR ===
ESCAR was issued to specifically handle "security offences"; the ISA defined a number of security offences, but the Attorney General could also certify any case as a security offence, and thus subject it to ESCAR. The special rules provided for by ESCAR permit witnesses to give evidence in camera, do not permit a jury trial, and require the trial judge to impose the maximum sentence possible under the law if the accused is found guilty. (In the case of Khong Teng Khen, the maximum sentence for the charges of the accused was the death penalty.) The nature of these rules has led to some groups, such as Amnesty International, to condemn the ESCAR as breaching "international standards of fair trial".

== Decision ==
In a 2-1 decision, the Federal Court held that the ESCAR was a constitutional law. Lord President Suffian and Federal Justice Wan Sulaiman were of the opinion that the ESCAR was promulgated on the basis of the authority granted to the Agong by section 2 of the Emergency (Essential Powers) Ordinance 1969, which allowed the Agong to promulgate law even when Parliament was in session. (The Ordinance had been promulgated to deal with the May 13 Incident in 1969, when racial rioting broke out in the federal capital of Kuala Lumpur, leading to a declaration of a state of emergency nationwide.) As a result, the provisions of Article 150 were irrelevant. Lord President Suffian said at the time:

...in my judgment the fact whether or not at the time they were made Parliament was in existence or was sitting is irrelevant. His Majesty has the power to make Ordinances under clause (2) of Article 150 only when Parliament is not sitting. In the case of regulations under s. 2 of the [Emergency (Essential Powers)] Ordinance they may be made by His Majesty whether or not Parliament is sitting.

It could be suggested that the state of emergency ESCAR had been promulgated to address was over, and as a result, ESCAR was automatically null and void, but Federal Justice Wan Sulaiman insisted that the existence of a state of emergency was not a question the courts were qualified to answer:

The ultimate right to decide if an emergency exists or has ceased to exist ... remains with Parliament, and it is not the function of any court to debate on that issue.

=== Dissent ===
The dissenting judge, Federal Justice Ong Hock Sim, was strongly critical of the decision. In his dissent, he wrote:

The 1975 Regulations, in my view, are a denial of Parliamentary rule. They are an abrogation of the Rule of Law. If these regulations are held valid, there appears no control as to the regulations the Executive may issue under the guise of an Emergency which had ceased to exist when Parliament was reconvened on February 20, 1971.

== Legacy ==
Legal scholars have been critical of the decision in Khong Teng Khen. One has said:

The provision of Article 150(2) in 1976 was clear in that the Agong had the authority to promulgate ordinances having the force of law 'until both Houses of Parliament are sitting'. No doubt under s. 2 of the 1969 Ordinance he was authorised to make [any] regulations whatsoever, but when Parliament resat on 20 February 1971 for the first time since the May 1969 disturbances, his ordinance-making power ceased by virtue of clause (2) of Article 150 as it stood in 1976.

Ong's dissent was later favoured by the Judicial Committee of the Privy Council in the case of Teng Cheng Poh v. Public Prosecutor, which overruled Khong Teng Khen. In Teng Cheng Poh, the Privy Council held that the ESCAR was ultra vires (in contravention of) the Constitution, and thus null and void. However, the ESCAR was later revived by Parliament as part of the Emergency (Essential Powers) Act (EEPA).

== See also ==
- Johnson Tan Han Seng v. Public Prosecutor
