= Johnson Tan Han Seng v Public Prosecutor =

Johnson Tan Han Seng v. Public Prosecutor [1977] 2 MLJ 66 is a Malaysian case concerning the lapsing of a Proclamation of Emergency by the Yang di-Pertuan Agong (King). The case was heard by the Federal Court, which unanimously held that the question of a Proclamation of Emergency's validity was political, not judicial, and as such the courts had no standing to decide the validity of a state of emergency.

== Background ==
Article 150 of the Constitution permits the Agong, on the advice of the Prime Minister, to proclaim a state of emergency in the country. The Proclamation of Emergency may be revoked by either the Agong or by both houses of Parliament. Clause (7) specifies that the proclamation may also be terminated after the passage of six months from the date which the Proclamation of Emergency states it shall cease to be in force. However, no Proclamation of Emergency has ever specified such a date; therefore, the state of emergency would exist until Parliament or the Agong revoked it.

In 1969, the May 13 Incident of racial rioting in the federal capital, Kuala Lumpur, caused the Agong to proclaim a nationwide emergency on May 15 of that year. During the period of emergency, the Agong promulgated a number of ordinances by way of the legislative powers granted to him through the Constitution. These legislative powers were only valid during the state of emergency, but the ordinances issued would persist after the emergency unless repealed by Parliament. One ordinance promulgated during the period of emergency in 1969 was the Emergency (Essential Powers) Ordinance No. 1.

In 1975, the Agong, who had been granted further legislative powers by the Emergency (Essential Powers) Ordinance, promulgated the Essential (Special Cases) Regulations 1975 (ESCAR). ESCAR provides for special rules governing trials classified as security cases — these rules, among other things, permit witnesses to give evidence in camera, forbid a jury trial, and mandate the maximum permissible sentence for a crime if the accused is found guilty.

Tan was tried under ESCAR, but challenged ESCAR's applicability on the grounds that there was no state of emergency in 1975, when ESCAR was promulgated. His argument was that the state of emergency in 1969 had long ceased to exist, rendering the Proclamation of Emergency irrelevant and of no effect — and thereby rendering ESCAR null and void.

== Decision ==
The judges of the Federal Court who heard the case — Lord President of the Federal Court Mohamed Suffian Mohamed Hashim, Federal Justice Wan Sulaiman and Federal Justice Raja Azlan Shah — unanimously held that the question was a "political" and not a judicial one. Lord President Suffian cited as persuasive precedent the decision of Justice Krishna Iyer in the Indian case Bhutnath v. State of West Bengal, where Iyer stated:

It was argued that there was no real emergency and yet the Proclamation remained unretracted with consequential peril to fundamental rights. In our view this is a political, not justiciable issue and the appeal should be to the polls and not to the courts. The traditional view that political question[s] fall outside the area of judicial review, is not a constitutional taboo but a pragmatic response of the court to the reality of its inadequacy to decide such issues and to the scheme of the Constitution which has assigned to each branch of the government in the larger sense a certain jurisdiction. ... The rule is one of self-restraint and of subject matter, political sense and respect for other branches of government like the legislature and the executive.

== Legacy ==
The decision in Johnson Tan reaffirmed that of Public Prosecutor v. Khong Teng Khen & Anor., a 1976 case where ESCAR's constitutionality had been challenged on similar grounds. In that case, Federal Justice Wan Sulaiman had held:

The ultimate right to decide if an emergency exists or has ceased to exist ... remains with Parliament, and it is not the function of any court to debate on that issue.

Despite the judgements in these two cases, in 1978, the Judicial Committee of the Privy Council overruled Khong Teng Khen by ruling in Teng Cheng Poh v. Public Prosecutor that ESCAR was ultra vires (in contravention of) the Constitution. Despite this, ESCAR was later revived by Parliament as part of the Emergency (Essential Powers) Act (EEPA).

Legal scholars have disapproved of the judgment in Johnson Tan, arguing that:

To simply group all matters under the purview of emergency proclamations as being political and therefore non-justiciable is as much as saying what the executive wants the executive gets; that the courts [get] to decide what is allocated to them; that it is Parliament that is supreme and not the Constitution as provided under Article 4. This case therefore would only appear to stand for the proposition that whatever political considerations are translated into Acts of Parliament, even if they have the effect of curtailing the courts' jurisdiction or the elementary rights of individuals, the courts would simply have to accept it as being political decisions, and therefore not interfere in any way.

Those critical of Johnson Tan cite the 1976 case of Cheah Soon Hoong v. Public Prosecutor, where an inferior court had held that the 1969 Proclamation of Emergency had lapsed, and also the non-binding obiter dictum of Lord Reid in the British case of Re Earl of Antrim and Eleven Other Irish Peers, where Lord Reid held:

A statutory provision becomes obsolete if the state of things on which its existence depended has ceased to exist so that its object is no longer attainable.

Despite these criticisms, under the legal principle of stare decisis, Johnson Tan remains binding law in Malaysia, allowing a Proclamation of Emergency to remain in force after the circumstances it was meant for have expired.

== See also ==
- Public Prosecutor v. Khong Teng Khen & Anor.
