= Lord President =

The title Lord President may refer to one of several offices:

- Lord President of the Council, the presiding officer of the Privy Council of the United Kingdom
- Lord President of the Court of Session, the Chief Justice and Lord Justice General of Scotland
- Lord President of the Supreme Court, the title of the head of the judiciary (now Chief Justice) of Malaysia until 1994
- Lord President of the Council of the North, the historical office of the English monarch's representative in the north of England
- Lord President of Munster
- Lord President of Connaught
- Lord President of Wales
- Lord President of the Federal Court of Malaysia, now Chief Justice of Malaysia

== In fiction ==
- Lord President of the High Council of Time Lords, the most senior office of the Time Lords in the Doctor Who universe
