= Raja Uda =

Malaysian statesman

Yang Berhormat Mulia Tun Dato' Seri Utama Sir Raja Uda Raja Muhammad SMN DUPN KBE CMG CBE PPM
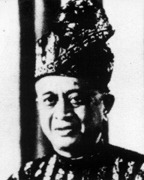

1st Governor of Penang
- In office 30 August 1957 – 30 August 1967
- Chief Minister: Wong Pow Nee
- Preceded by: Office established
- Succeeded by: Syed Sheh Shahabudin

2nd and 4th Menteri Besar of Selangor
- In office September 1954 – August 1955
- Monarch: Hisamuddin Alam Shah
- Preceded by: Othman bin Muhammad
- Succeeded by: Abdul Aziz bin Abdul Majid
- In office July 1949 – March 1953
- Monarch: Hisamuddin Alam Shah
- Preceded by: Hamzah bin Abdullah
- Succeeded by: Othman bin Muhammad

Personal details
- Born: Raja Uda bin Raja Muhammad; 15 December 1894 Jugra, Kuala Langat, Selangor, Federated Malay States, British Malaya (now Malaysia)
- Died: 16 October 1976 (aged 81) Petaling Jaya, Selangor, Malaysia
- Resting place: Royal Mausoleum, Klang, Selangor
- Party: Independent; UMNO-aligned
- Spouse(s): Raja Maslamah binti Raja Busu; Tengku Badariah binti Al-Marhum Sultan Alaeddin Sulaiman Shah; Tengku Nor Saadah binti Al-Marhum Sultan Alaeddin Sulaiman
- Parents: Raja Muhammad bin Raja Usman bin Raja Umar bin Raja Busu Hassan ibni Almarhum Raja Muda Nala ibni Almarhum Sultan Salehuddin (father); Raja Embut Long binti Raja Barkat (mother)
- Profession: Politician

Raja Uda bin Raja Muhammad (15 December 1894 – 16 October 1976) was a Malaysian statesman during the country's struggle for independence and its early years of nationhood. He was a civil servant under the British colonial administration, and eventually rose to important administrative positions within the government. Upon the independence of Malaya in 1957, he became the first Yang di-Pertua Negeri (Governor) of Penang, one of the four states in Malaysia without a hereditary ruler.

Uda was also the grandfather of Malaysian political blogger Raja Petra Kamaruddin.

== Biography ==
Raja Uda was a member of the House of Opu Daeng Chelak, being a distant cousin of Sultan Hisamuddin Alam Shah and a direct descendant of the first Sultan of Selangor. He married both of Sultan Hisamuddin's sisters namely, Tengku Badariah binti Sultan Alaeddin Sulaiman Shah and Tengku Nor Saadah.

Educated at the Malay College Kuala Kangsar, Raja Uda joined the colonial government service in 1910 at the age of 16. In 1939, he was appointed as secretary to the British Resident of Selangor. He was Menteri Besar of Selangor twice, from 1949 to 1953, and again from 1954 to 1955. In between, Raja Uda served as Malayan High Commissioner in the United Kingdom. He was involved in negotiations with the British to establish the Member System in the 1950s.

In 1951, Raja Uda was appointed a CMG and appointed an Honorary Knight Commander of the Most Excellent Order of the British Empire in 1953. Following the first ever general election in 1955, Raja Uda was appointed Speaker of the Federal Legislative Council.

On August 30, 1957, the day before independence, Raja Uda was appointed the first Governor of the state of Penang and served for ten years.

Raja Tun Uda died on 16 October 1976, and he was buried at the Selangor royal mausoleum near Sultan Sulaiman Mosque in Klang, Selangor.

== Legacy ==
Several projects and institutions were named after him, including:

- The neighbourhood of Kampung Raja Uda, Port Klang, Selangor
  - Kampung Raja Uda Komuter station
- Raja Uda MRT station
- Perpustakaan Raja Tun Uda or Raja Tun Uda Library in Section 13, Shah Alam, Selangor.
- The Weld Quay in George Town, Penang was renamed Pengkalan Raja Tun Uda.
- Sekolah Menengah Kebangsaan Raja Tun Uda (SMKRaTU) in Bayan Lepas, Penang
- Masjid Jamek Raja Tun Uda, the first mosque built in Shah Alam, Selangor located at Section 16.

Streets

- Jalan Raja Uda in Butterworth, Penang
- Jalan Raja Uda in Kuala Lumpur

== Honours ==
=== Honour of Malaysia ===
- Malaya
  - Grand Commander of the Order of the Defender of the Realm (SMN) – Tun (1958)
- Malaysia
  - Recipient of the Malaysian Commemorative Medal (Gold) (PPM) (1965)
- Penang
  - Grand Master and Grand Principal of the Order of the Defender of State (DUPN) – Dato' Seri Utama (1 August 1967–30 August 1967)

=== Foreign Honours ===
- United Kingdom
  - Recipient of the King George VI Coronation Medal (1937)
  - Honorary Commander of the Order of the British Empire (CBE) (1945)
  - Honorary Companion of the Order of St Michael and St George (CMG) (1951)
  - Honorary Knight Commander of the Order of the British Empire (KBE) – Sir (1953)

== Notes ==
New creation	Yang di-Pertua Negeri of Penang; 1957–1967	Succeeded by Syed Sheh Shahabudin
