= Syed Sheh Shahabudin =

Malaysian politician (1912–1969)

Yang Amat Berbahagia Tun Dato' Seri Utama Syed Sheh Shahabudin SMN DUPN
- سيد شيه سيد عبدﷲ شهاب الدين

2nd Governor of Penang
- In office 31 August 1967 – 31 January 1969
- Preceded by: Raja Uda Raja Muhammad
- Succeeded by: Syed Sheh Hassan Barakbah

Personal details
- Born: 28 February 1912 Alor Setar, Kedah, Unfederated Malay States
- Died: 31 January 1969 (aged 56) Seri Mutiara, Georgetown, Penang, Malaysia
- Resting place: Kedah Royal Mausoleum, Langgar, Kedah
- Party: United Malays National Organisation
- Spouse: Tunku Habsah Sultan Abdul Hamid Halim Shah
- Relations: Tunku Abdul Rahman (brother-in-law)

Syed Sheh bin Syed Abdullah Shahabudin (28 February 1912 – 31 January 1969) was the Governor of the Malaysian state of Penang from 1967 to 1969.

== Honours ==
=== Honours of Malaysia ===
- Malaya
  - Commander of the Order of the Defender of the Realm (PMN) – Tan Sri (1962)
- Malaysia
  - Grand Commander of the Order of the Defender of the Realm (SMN) – Tun (1968)
- Penang
  - Grand Master of the Order of the Defender of State (DUPN) – Dato' Seri Utama

=== Foreign honours ===
- Japan
  - Gold and Silver Star of the Order of the Rising Sun (1964)

Preceded by Raja Uda Raja Muhammad	Yang di-Pertua Negeri of Penang; 1967–1969	Succeeded by Syed Sheh Hassan Barakbah
