= Campbell Shopping Complex fire =

1976 fire in Kuala Lumpur, Malaysia

- Date: 8 April 1976
- Time: 10:30 pm
- Duration: 30 hours
- Location: Jalan Campbell, Kuala Lumpur; 3.16°N 101.7°E
- Type: Highrise fire
- Cause: Electrical short circuit
- Deaths: 1
- Property damage: 156 shops and 41 offices destroyed

The Campbell Shopping Complex fire was a disaster in Malaysia which took place on 8 April 1976 at Jalan Campbell (now Jalan Dang Wangi), Kuala Lumpur. The entire shopping complex, including its 20-storey office tower block, was destroyed in a fire. It is the worst fire disaster involving a high-rise building to date in Malaysia, burning for more than 24 hours.

== Background ==
The Campbell Shopping Complex itself (and Malaysia's oldest surviving mall to date) was opened in May 1973 and was, at that time, Kuala Lumpur's first high-rise shopping complex. The incident occurred at a time when the Hollywood blockbuster movie The Towering Inferno was aired.

== Fire ==
The fire, which started at 10:30 pm, lasted for nearly 30 hours, claiming the life of one victim, Yap Leong Hoe, 59, as well as total monetary losses of RM50 million. The cause of the fire was an electrical short circuit. Ultimately, 156 shops and 41 offices were destroyed.

== Aftermath ==
There was a proposal to have the tower block of the complex demolished shortly after the fire because it was initially thought that the intense heat from the blaze might have weakened the reinforced concrete structure of the building thus posing a hazard. However, examinations done by competent engineers proved otherwise. It was under repair and reconstructed at a cost of RM10 million for a number of years after the blaze before it was reopened to the public around 1979.

The Fire Protection Association of Malaysia (FPAM) was formed the same year after the incident occurred. The incident also highlighted the standards of fire safety in high-rise buildings in the country as well as the limited fire-fighting capabilities at that time. Laws were eventually passed to ensure that high-rise premises must meet certain standards of fire safety, e.g., the issuing of certificates before they can be deemed fit for dwelling or commercial purposes.
