= Syed Sheh Barakbah =

Malaysian politician (1906–1975)

Yang Amat Berbahagia Tun Syed Sheh Syed Hassan Barakbah SMN SSM DUPN SPMK PSB
- سيد شيه الحج سيد حسن برکبه
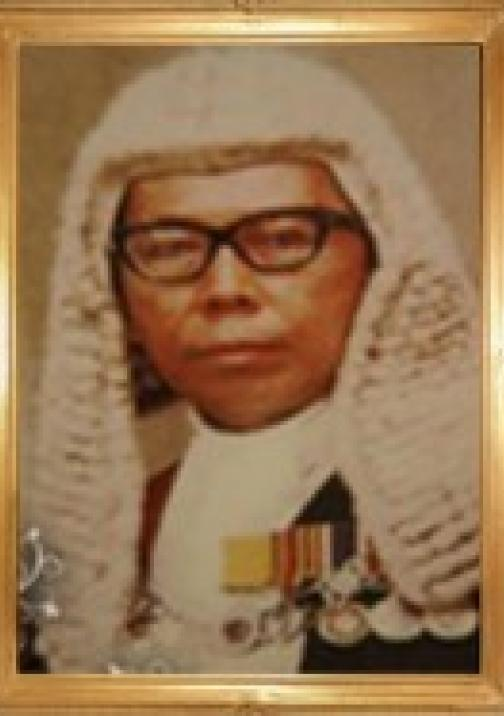
- Official portrait, 1966

3rd Governor of Penang
- In office 1 February 1969 – 1 February 1975
- Preceded by: Syed Sheh Shahabudin
- Succeeded by: Sardon Jubir

2nd President of the Dewan Negara
- In office 27 January 1969 – 5 February 1969
- Preceded by: Abdul Rahman Mohamed Yassin
- Succeeded by: Mohamed Noah Omar

2nd Lord President of the Federal Court
- In office 1966–1968
- Preceded by: James Beveridge Thomson
- Succeeded by: Azmi Mohamed

Personal details
- Born: 10 November 1906 Alor Setar, Kedah, Siam (now Malaysia)
- Died: 8 October 1975 (aged 68) Alor Setar, Kedah, Malaysia
- Resting place: Kedah Royal Mausoleum, Langgar, Kedah
- Education: Sultan Abdul Hamid College
- Alma mater: Inner Temple (LLB)
- Occupation: Politician
- Profession: Judge

Tun Syed Sheh bin Syed Hassan Barakbah (10 November 1906 – 8 October 1975) was a prominent Malaysian judge and politician. He was the second Lord President of the Federal Court, and the first Malaysian to hold that office. After his career in the judiciary, he briefly served as President of the Dewan Negara and later Governor of the Malaysian state of Penang. He is the shortest-serving President of the Dewan Negara in the history of Malaysia.

== Early life and education ==
Born in Alor Star, Kedah, Sheh was of Hadhrami-Malay descent; his Arab ancestors had migrated from Hadhramaut and settled in Kedah for several generations. Being of the Barakbah clan, he is related to Sharifah Rodziah Syed Alwi Barakbah, the third wife of the first Prime Minister of Malaysia, Tunku Abdul Rahman.

Sheh received his education at the Sultan Abdul Hamid College before continuing his studies in England sponsored by the Kedah State Government's scholarship. He was accepted to read law at the Inner Temple and graduated in 1934 with a Bachelor of Laws (LLB) degree.

== Career ==
Sheh began his career in the judiciary as a special magistrate in the Colonial Legal Service in 1946. After independence, he served as a judge on the Court of Appeal and in 1963, was appointed Chief Justice of Malaya. In 1968, Sheh succeeded Tun Sir James Thomson as Lord President of the Federal Court, then the highest office in the Malaysian judiciary. He was the first Malaysian to serve in that capacity.

After retiring as Lord President, Sheh was appointed a Senator in the Dewan Negara, the upper house of the Parliament of Malaysia. He became President of the Dewan Negara in 1969, serving for little over a week until early February. He retired from the Senate later that month and was appointed the third Governor of the state of Penang by Yang di-Pertuan Agong Tuanku Ismail Nasiruddin. He served two terms (four years, then two years) until February 1975.

In becoming Lord President, President of the Dewan Negara and Governor of Penang, Sheh has served in senior positions in the Malaysian executive, legislative and judicial branches of government.

== Death ==
Sheh died on 8 October 1975, in Alor Star, Kedah.

== Legacy ==
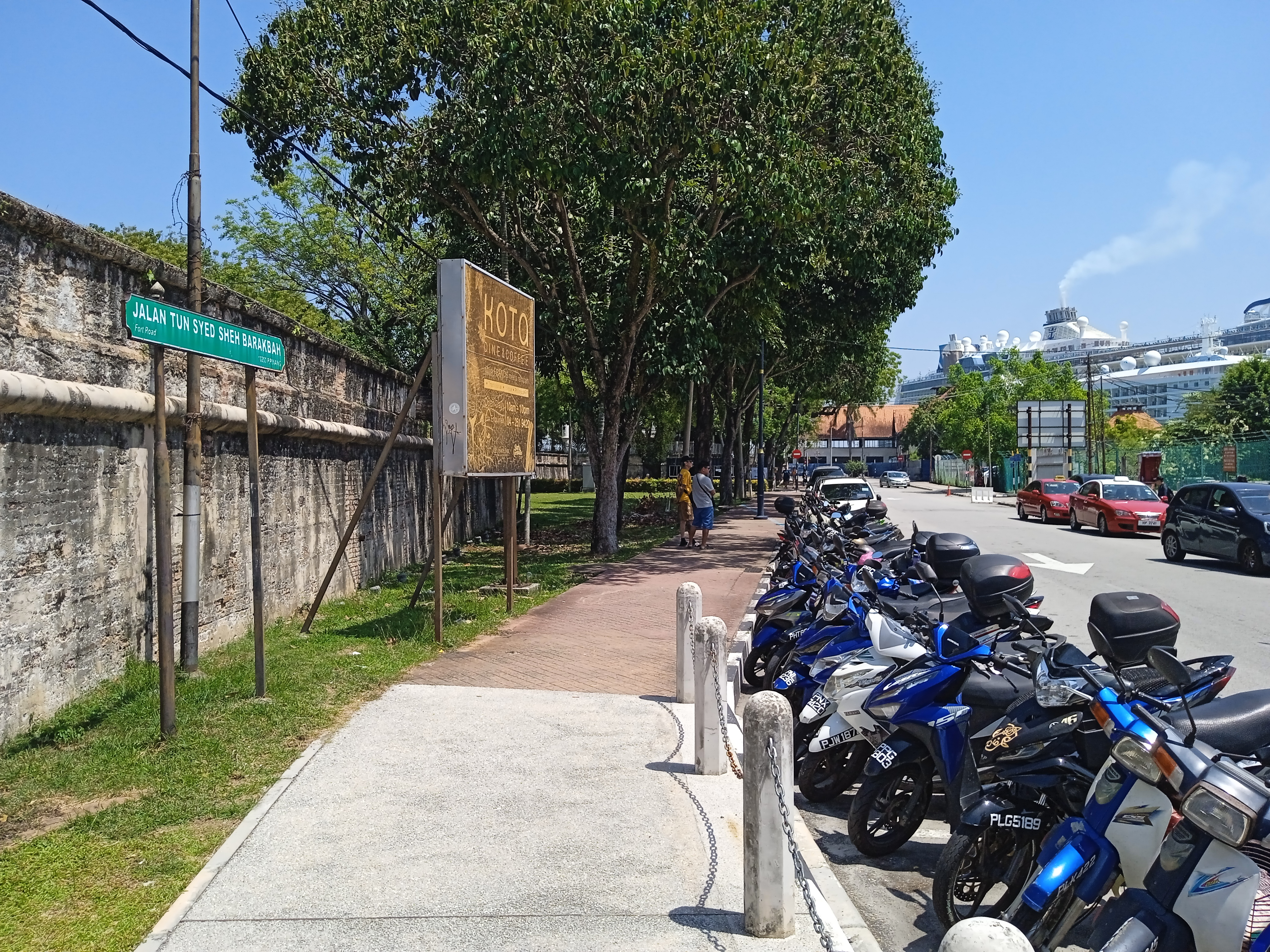
Jalan Tun Syed Sheh Barakbah

The Esplanade Road in George Town, Penang was renamed as Jalan Tun Syed Sheh Barakbah.

== Honours ==
=== Honours of Malaysia ===
- Malaysia
  - Commander of the Order of the Defender of the Realm (PMN) – Tan Sri (1965)
  - Grand Commander of the Order of Loyalty to the Crown of Malaysia (SSM) – Tun (1967)
  - Grand Commander of the Order of the Defender of the Realm (SMN) – Tun (1971)
- Kedah
  - Knight Grand Commander of the Order of the Crown of Kedah (SPMK) – Dato' Seri (1969)
- Penang
  - Knight Grand Commander of the Order of the Defender of State (DUPN) – Dato' Seri Utama

=== Foreign honours ===
- Brunei
  - Officer of the Order of Setia Negara Brunei (PSB)

Preceded by Syed Sheh Shahabudin	Yang di-Pertua Negeri of Penang; 1969–1975	Succeeded by Sardon Jubir
Preceded by James Beveridge Thomson	Lord President of the Federal Court; 1966–1968	Succeeded by Azmi Mohamed
