= T. Gopinath Naidu =

Malaysian footballer (1973 – 2025)

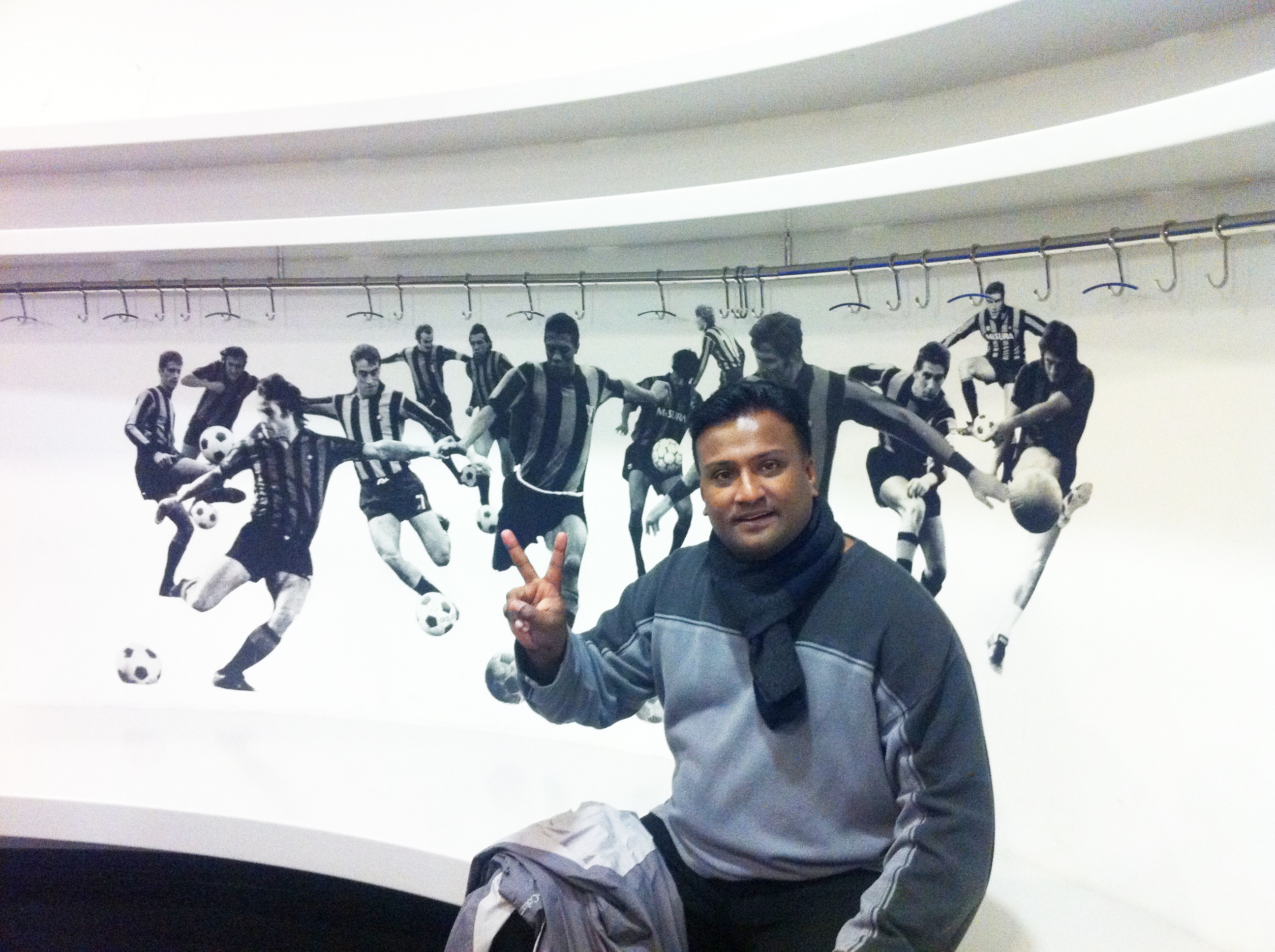
Gopinath Naidu in San Siro.

T. Gopinath Naidu (25 October 1974 – 24 May 2025) was a Malaysian footballer who was a striker for Kuala Lumpur FA, Perak FA and the Malaysia national football team.

== Career ==
Gopinath Naidu started his football career with Kuala Lumpur's youth team in 1986. At that time he was only 12 and he represented the state and country in various age group tournaments. He won top-scorer and best player awards at the Malaysia national tournaments and internationally. His impressive performance with Kuala Lumpur's youth team and Malaysian's national youth team earned him an attachment with Aston Villa at that time being managed by former Kuala Lumpur coach Josef Venglos and Ron Atkinson. Later, he moved to Bayer Leverkusen under Reinhard Saftig where he gained experience playing with players such as Brazilian Jorginho, Christian Worns, Ulf Kirsten, Dwight Yorke, Paul McGrath, Steve Staunton, Bryan Robson, Brazilians Branco, Juninho and others.

He also trained under several notable coaches, including Dettmar Cramer, Eckhard Krautzun, Claude Le Roy, Ken Shellito, Colin Harvey, Dick Bate and local coaches such as M. Karathu, Chow Kwai Lam, Khaidir Buyong, B. Sathianathan, Dato and Ahmad Shafie.

In 1992, he was offered a professional playing contract with Kuala Lumpur by President Elyas Omar who was the mayor of Kuala Lumpur. During this period, he played against several top players and teams such as Aston Villa, Inter Milan, Arsenal, Bayern Munich, Middlesbrough, Monaco, AEK Athens, FC Kaiserslautern and Everton.

While he was reaching his peak he sustained a serious knee injury which he underwent surgeries in Germany, Hong Kong and Malaysia. He returned and played for Kuala Lumpur, winning the 1993 and 1994 Malaysia FA Cup, which gained him the title as a top scorer. This resulted in him being recruited to play the 1994 Asian Games in Hiroshima and the pre-qualifying for the 1996 Summer Olympics Atlanta team under Claude Le Roy in 1994.

He continued playing for the Malaysian League for Kuala Lumpur, and later for Perak. However, due to his serious anterior knee cruciate ligament injuries throughout his football career, Gopi made the decision to retire as a professional footballer. After retirement from football, he moved to Hong Kong in 1998 and was attached with East Asia sports consultancy.

== Personal life and death ==
Gopinath Naidu was the father of two children. He died on 24 May 2025, at the age of 50.

== Gallery ==
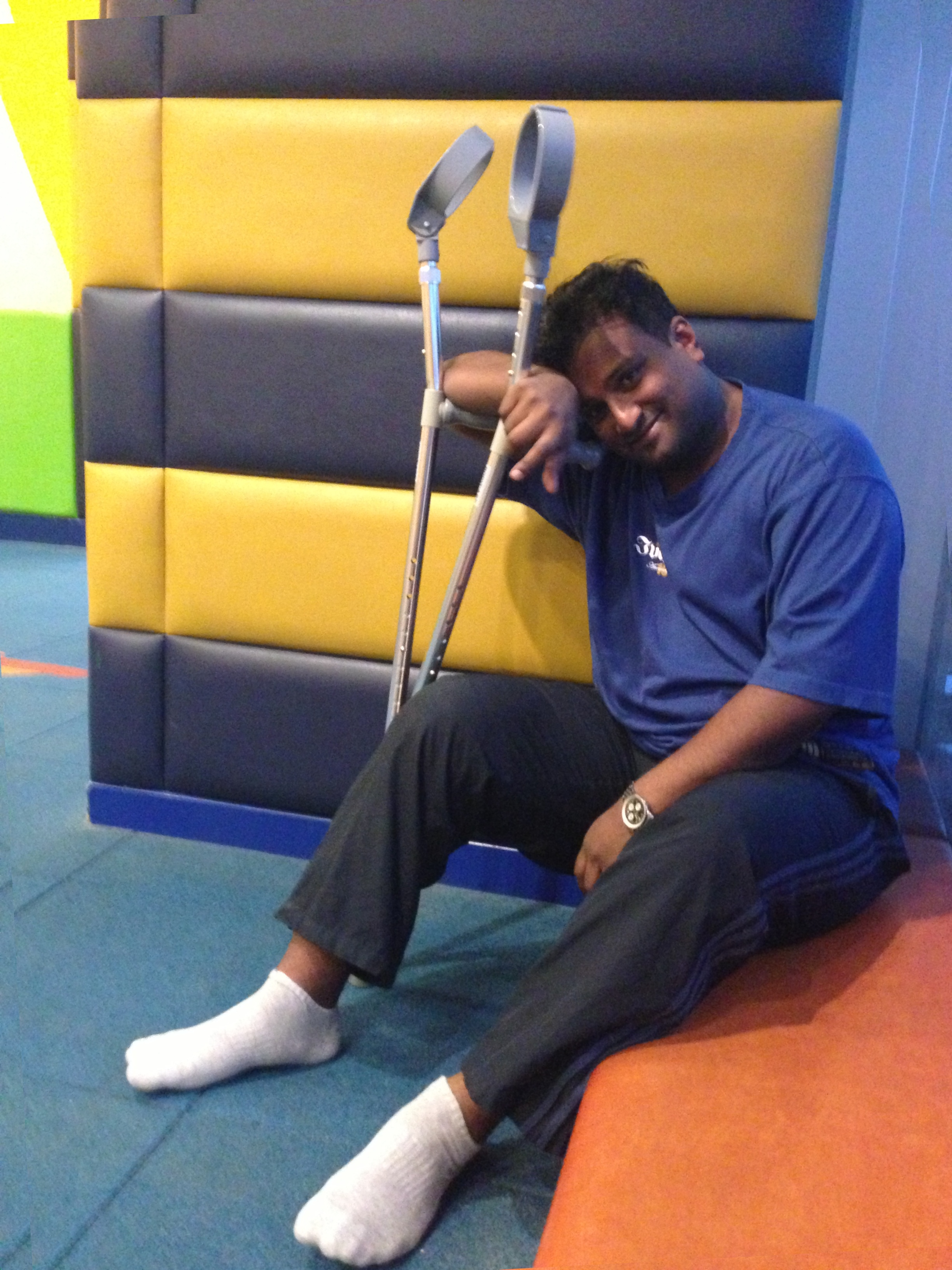
Gopinath Naidu.
