= Kazim Elias =

Malaysian popular Islamic cleric

Yang Berbahagia Ustaz Dato' Kazim Elias DPMP PMW
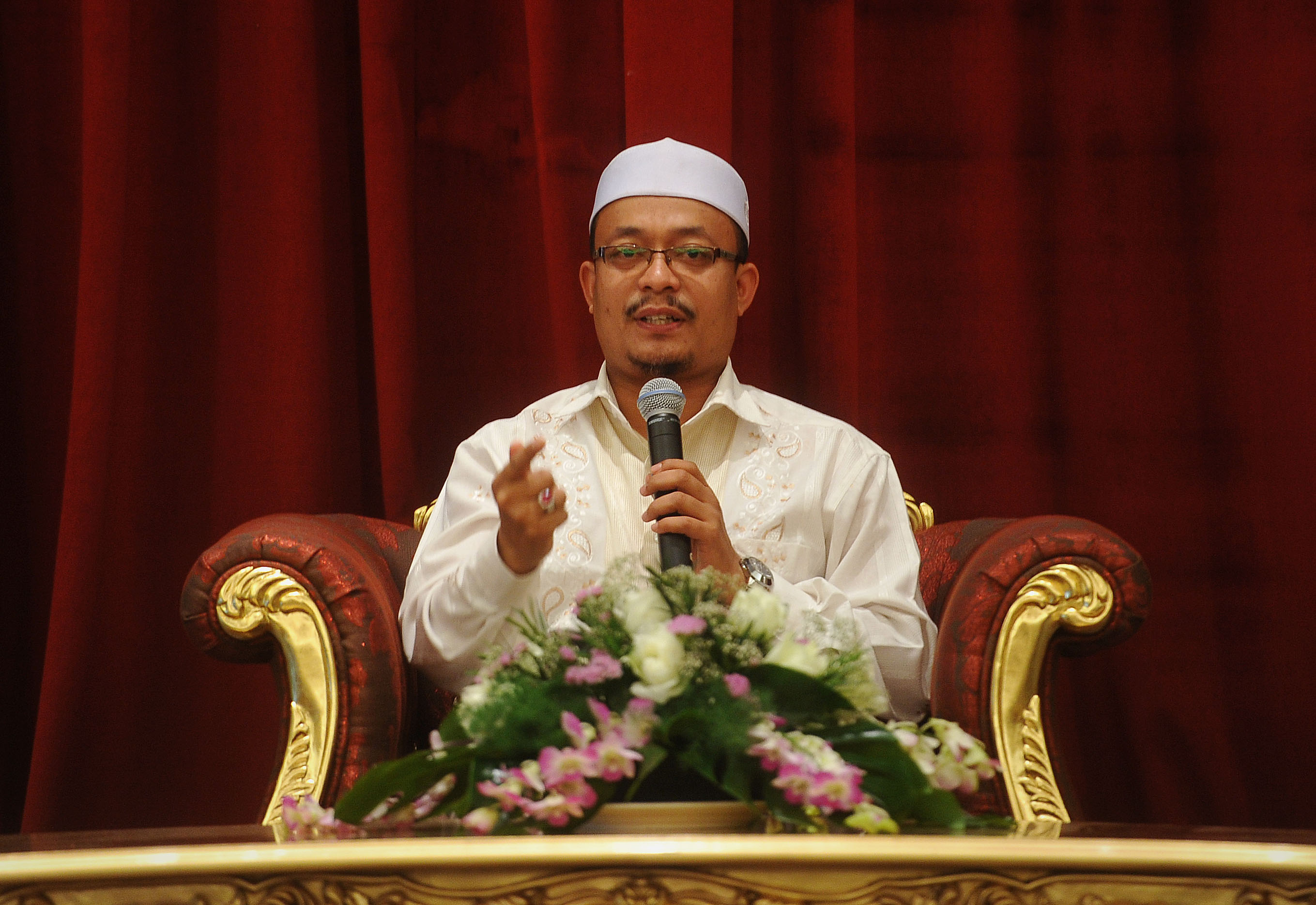
- Elias in 2013

Personal life
- Born: Mohammad Kazim bin Elias; November 28, 1972 (age 53) Mukim Selama, Perak, Malaysia
- Notable work: Allah Sedang Menguji Kita
- Occupation: Preacher, lecturer, writer, islamic consultant, actor

Religious life
- Religion: Islam

Ustaz Dato' Mohammad Kazim bin Elias (born November 28, 1972), better known as Ustaz Dato' Kazim Elias, is a Malaysian popular independent preacher, writer, lecturer and Islamic consultant from Malaysia.

== Honours ==
=== Honours of Malaysia ===
- Federal Territory (Malaysia)
  - Knight Commander of the Order of the Territorial Crown (PMW) – Datuk (2015)
- Perak
  - Knight Commander of the Order of the Perak State Crown (DPMP) – Dato' (2015)
