= 1971 Kuala Lumpur floods =

Flash flood disaster in Malaysia

The 1971 Kuala Lumpur floods was a major flash flood disaster in Malaysia that occurred in January 1971. The flooding was the result of heavy monsoon rains, which swelled the Klang, Batu, and Gombak rivers. 32 people were killed and 180,000 people were affected. The Malaysian Prime Minister Tun Abdul Razak declared a state of national disaster in Western Malaysia.

The floods were the worst in the country since 1926. As a result of the flooding, the Kuala Lumpur Flood Mitigation Programme was set up.
