= Lord President of the Supreme Court =

The title of Lord President of the Supreme Court was formerly the title of the head of the judiciary in Malaysia, until 1994 when the office was renamed "Chief Justice of the Federal Court".

The lord president was head of the highest court in Malaysia after the abolition of appeals from Malaysia to the Judicial Committee of the Privy Council in 1985. Below him were the chief justices of the High Courts of Malaya and Borneo (and, until 1969, Singapore: see Law of Singapore).

== History ==
=== Origins ===
The office of Lord President of the Federal Court was created with the formation of Malaysia in 1963. The first Lord President of the Federal Court was Tun Sir James Thomson, previously Chief Justice of Malaya, and a Scotsman. It is after the Scottish office of Lord President of the Court of Session that the office was named.

When the right of appeal to the Judicial Committee of the Privy Council was abolished in 1985, the Federal Court was renamed the Supreme Court and the title was changed accordingly.

=== The 1988 constitutional crisis ===
In 1988, Lord President Tun Salleh Abas was brought before a tribunal convened by the Prime Minister Dr Mahathir Mohamad on the grounds of misconduct. The Supreme Court in the years leading up to 1988 had been fiercely independent and increasingly active, and was at the time due to hear an appeal to determine the future of the ruling party UMNO, which had been declared an illegal society by the High Court of Malaya on the grounds of procedural irregularity. As a result of criticisms of the judiciary made by the Prime Minister, a letter of protest was written by Tun Salleh to the Yang di-Pertuan Agong on behalf of the judiciary. This letter was later used as grounds for the convening of the tribunal.

When the Supreme Court granted an injunction prohibiting the tribunal as constituted from hearing the misconduct allegations, five Supreme Court Justices were suspended (and two were subsequently removed), and the injunction overturned. The tribunal later removed Tun Salleh Abas from the office of Lord President, in which office he was succeeded by the then-Chief Justice of Malaya, Tun Hamid Omar, who had been the chairman of the tribunal.

The 1988 constitutional crisis was widely considered to be the greatest blow to judicial independence in Malaysian history, and at the time led to the Bar Council of Malaysia refusing to recognise the new Lord President. Around the same time, the Federal Constitution was amended to divest the courts of the "judicial power of the Federation", granting them instead such judicial powers as the Parliament of Malaysia might grant them.

=== Renaming of the office ===
In 1994, in a move regarded as a further downgrading of the judiciary, the office of Lord President was renamed "Chief Justice of the Federal Court", and the offices of Chief Justices of the High Courts in Malaya and in Borneo renamed "Chief Judge of the High Court in Malaya" and "Chief Judge of the High Court in Sabah and Sarawak" respectively. The Supreme Court reverted to the name of Federal Court.

== List of lords president of Malaysia ==
- Sir James Thomson: 1963 to 1966
- Syed Sheh Hassan Barakbah: 1966 to 1968
- Azmi Mohamed: 1968 to 1974
- Mohamed Suffian Mohamed Hashim: 1974 to 1982
- Azlan Shah (later 34th Sultan of Perak and 9th Yang di-Pertuan Agong of Malaysia): 1982 to 1984
- Mohamed Salleh Abas: 1984 to 1988
- Abdul Hamid Omar: 1988 to 1994

== See also ==
- Courts of Malaysia
