= Azmi Mohamed (judge) =

Yang Amat Berbahagia Tun Azmi Mohamed SSM PMN
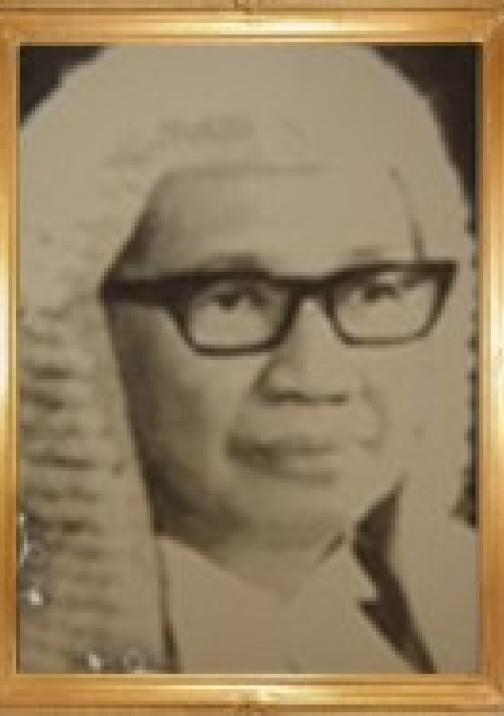

Lord President of the Federal Court
- In office 1968–1974
- Preceded by: Syed Sheh Hassan Barakbah
- Succeeded by: Mohamed Suffian Mohamed Hashim

Personal details
- Born: Azmi bin Mohamed

Tun Azmi bin Mohamed was the former Lord President of the Federal Court. His son, Zaki Azmi was the sixth Chief Justice of Malaysia.

== Honours ==
=== Honours of Malaysia ===
- Malaysia
  - Commander of the Order of the Defender of the Realm (PMN) – Tan Sri (1967)
  - Grand Commander of the Order of Loyalty to the Crown of Malaysia (SSM) – Tun (1970)

Preceded by Syed Sheh Hassan Barakbah	Lord President of the Federal Court; 1968–1974	Succeeded by Mohamed Suffian Mohamed Hashim
