= Raja Perempuan Zainab II =

Raja Permaisuri Agong from 1975 to 1979

Zainab II زينب

Queen consort of Malaysia
- Tenure: 21 September 1975 – 29 March 1979
- Installation: 28 February 1976
- Predecessor: Tuanku Bahiyah
- Successor: Tengku Afzan

Raja Perempuan of Kelantan
- Tenure: 10 July 1960 – 29 March 1979
- Coronation: 17 July 1961
- Predecessor: Tengku Zainab binti Al-Marhum Tengku Zainal Abidin
- Successor: Tengku Anis binti Al-Marhum Tengku Abdul Hamid
- Born: 7 August 1917; Kota Bharu, Kelantan, Unfederated Malay States, British Malaya
- Died: 10 January 1993 (aged 75); Istana Negeri, Kubang Kerian, Kelantan, Malaysia
- Burial: Langgar Royal Mausoleum, Kota Bharu, Kelantan
- Spouse: Sultan Yahya Petra (m. 1939; died 1979)
- Issue: Tengku Merjan; Tengku Rozan; Tengku Salwani; Tengku Rohani; Tengku Ismail Petra
Names
- Tengku Zainab binti Tengku Mohamed Petra
Regnal name
- Raja Perempuan Zainab II
- House: Long Yunus
- Father: Tengku Mohamed Petra bin Tengku Idris
- Mother: Tengku Kembang Petri binti al-Marhum Sultan Muhammad IV
- Religion: Sunni Islam

Raja Perempuan Zainab II (Jawi: راج ڤرمڤوان زينب; born Tengku Zainab binti Tengku Mohamed Petra; 7 August 1917 – 10 January 1993) was the Raja Perempuan (Queen dowager) from 1979 until her death in 1993. She was previously the Raja Perempuan (Queen consort) of Kelantan from 1960 until the death of her husband in 1979. She also served as the 6th Raja Permaisuri Agong (Queen of Malaysia) from 20 September 1975 to 29 March 1979.

Born on 7 August 1917 in Kota Bharu, Kelantan, she was the consort of the 27th Sultan of Kelantan, Sultan Yahya Petra and the mother of the 28th Sultan of Kelantan, Sultan Ismail Petra.

== Marriage and queenship ==
Tengku Zainab, daughter of Almarhum Tengku Mohamed Petra, the Tengku Sri Utama Raja and Almarhumah Tengku Kembang Petri, the Tengku Maharani Putri, married Sultan Yahya Petra ibni Almarhum Sultan Ibrahim Petra of Kelantan on 4 June 1939, who at the time held the title as Tengku Temenggong of Kelantan. She was then conferred the title Tengku Puan Temenggong of Kelantan.

She was given the title Tengku Ampuan Mahkota (Crown Princess) of Kelantan by Sultan Ibrahim on 9 August 1956 when her husband was proclaimed as the Tengku Mahkota (Crown Prince) of Kelantan. On the same day she was conferred the S.P.M.K. Order.

In 1960, her husband Sultan Yahya Petra became the Sultan of Kelantan and as his wife she was proclaimed the title of Raja Perempuan (Queen consort) of Kelantan. Tengku Zainab was conferred the Darjah Kerabat (D.K. – Royal Family Order) on the first anniversary of Sultan Yahya Petra's installation.

She served as Raja Permaisuri Agong of Malaysia during her husband's reign as the Yang di-Pertuan Agong from 1975 to 1979.

On his death on 29 March 1979, she returned to Kelantan where she guided her only son, Sultan Ismail Petra, in the performance of his duties.

Tengku Zainab was conferred the title "Yang Maha Mulia Raja Perempuan Zainab II" by her son, His Royal Highness Sultan Ismail Petra, after he was proclaimed as the Sultan of Kelantan in 1979, succeeding the late Sultan Yahya Petra. She took the regnal name of “Raja Perempuan Zainab II” as her stepmother-in-law was also known as Raja Perempuan Zainab I.

== Duties and interests ==
Tengku Zainab accompanied Sultan Yahya Petra on his official visits to several countries which gave her the opportunity to fulfill her responsibility as the Raja Perempuan and the Raja Permaisuri Agong.

Tengku Zainab was a kind person who loved doing charity work. She was once the president of various social organisations such as the Girl Guides of Kelantan and the Women's Institution.

Tengku Zainab gave special attention to ‘house-keeping’ such as decorating the palace and preparing food for the royal family. She also loved doing handicraft, collecting antiques and gardening.

== Death ==
Tengku Zainab died on 10 January 1993 at the Kubang Kerian State Palace at the age of 75. She was laid to rest at the Kelantan Royal Mausoleum.

== Awards and recognitions ==
=== Honours of Kelantan ===
- Knight Grand Commander of the Order of the Crown of Kelantan (SPMK) - Dato' (9 August 1956)
- Recipient of the Royal Family Order of Kelantan (DK) (10 July 1960)

=== Honours of Malaysia ===
- Recipient of the Order of the Crown of the Realm (DMN) (28 February 1976)

=== Places named after her ===
Several places named after her, including:

- Raja Perempuan Zainab II Mosque in Kubang Kerian, Kota Bharu, Kelantan
- Jalan Raja Perempuan Zainab II (Federal Route 131) in Kubang Kerian, Kota Bharu, Kelantan
- Raja Perempuan Zainab II Hospital in Kota Bharu, Kelantan
- SK Zainab (2), a primary school in Kota Bharu, Kelantan
- SMK Zainab (2), a secondary school in Kota Bharu, Kelantan

== See also ==
- Yang Di-Pertuan Agong
- Raja Permaisuri Agong

Malaysian royalty
Preceded by Tuanku Bahiyah (Sultanah of Kedah)	Raja Permaisuri Agong (Queen of Malaysia)	Succeeded by Tengku Afzan (Tengku Ampuan of Pahang)
