= Yahya Petra of Kelantan =

King of Malaysia from 1975 to 1979

Yahya Petra: يحيى ڤيترا
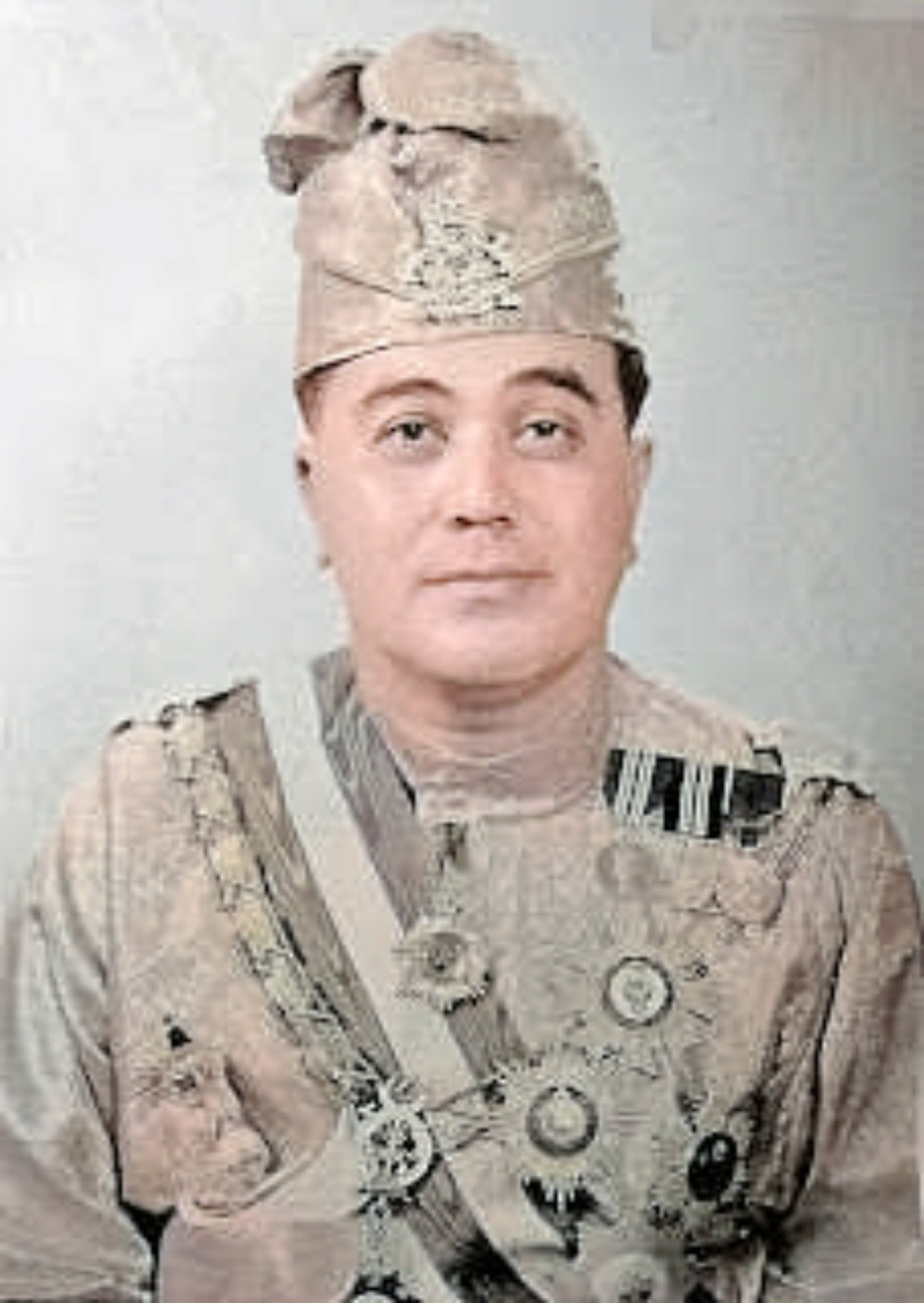
- Yahya Petra in 1960

King of Malaysia
- Reign: 21 September 1975 – 29 March 1979
- Installation: 28 February 1976
- Predecessor: Abdul Halim
- Successor: Ahmad Shah

Sultan of Kelantan
- Reign: 10 July 1960 – 29 March 1979
- Coronation: 17 July 1961
- Predecessor: Ibrahim
- Successor: Ismail Petra
- Born: 10 December 1917; Istana Balai Besar, Kota Bharu, Kelantan, Unfederated Malay States
- Died: 29 March 1979 (aged 61); Istana Negara, Kuala Lumpur, Malaysia
- Burial: 30 March 1979; Langgar Royal Mausoleum, Kota Bharu, Kelantan, Malaysia
- Spouse: Tengku Zainab binti Tengku Muhammad Petra (m. 1939) Tengku Alexandria binti Tengku Yusof (before 1979)
- Issue: Tengku Merjan; Tengku Rozan; Tengku Salwani; Tengku Rohani; Tengku Ismail Petra; Tengku Mohamed; Tengku Maziah; Tengku Zubaidah
Names
- Tengku Yahya Petra ibni Tengku Ibrahim
Regnal name
- Sultan Yahya Petra ibni Almarhum Sultan Ibrahim
- House: Long Yunus
- Father: Sultan Ibrahim Ibni Almarhum Sultan Muhammad IV
- Mother: Che Puan Besar Embong Binti Daud
- Religion: Sunni Islam

Yahya Petra ibni Almarhum Sultan Ibrahim GCMG (Jawi: سلطان يحيى ڤيترا ابن المرحوم سلطان إبراهيم; 10 December 1917 – 29 March 1979) was the 27th sultan of Kelantan from 1960, and the sixth Yang di-Pertuan Agong, the constitutional monarch of Malaysia, from 1975, until his death in 1979.

== Early life ==
He was born on 10 December 1917, as Tengku Yahya Petra at the Istana Balai Besar in Kota Bharu, Kelantan. He was the second son of Sultan Ibrahim (b. 1897; r. 1944–1960) by his third wife, Cik Embong binti Encik Daud (1899–1971).

Tengku Yahya Petra was raised by his childless uncle, Tengku Ismail (later Sultan Ismail). He was sent to the Francis Light School in Penang before continuing his studies in England. His uncle, Sultan Ismail, appointed him Tengku Temenggong Kelantan on 21 July 1939. He was later promoted to Tengku Bendahara Kelantan on 6 February 1945 by his father, Sultan Ibrahim. He served in various Kelantan civil service posts from 1941 to 1948.

== Kelantan succession dispute ==
Tengku Indra Petra was the eldest son of Sultan Ibrahim and elder brother of Sultan Yahya Petra. After Sultan Ibrahim succeeded his brother Sultan Ismail, Tengku Indra Petra was appointed heir apparent with the title of Raja Muda Kelantan on 25 October 1944. However, due to conflict with his father, he was dismissed from the post and removed from the line of succession by his father's decree on 1 February 1948. On the same day, Sultan Yahya Petra replaced his brother as heir apparent with the new title of Tengku Mahkota Kelantan.

Tengku Indra Petra became a politician and was elected a Member of Parliament in the 1955 Malayan general election. Tengku Indra's descendants have since disputed their family's exclusion from Kelantan's line of succession.

Tengku Indra Petra did not preside over the installation of Sultan Yahya Petra's successor, Sultan Ismail Petra, It was Tengku Panglima Raja Tengku Ahmad (the father of the former Sultanah of Johor, Sultanah Zanariah binti Tengku Ahmad) who presided over the installations of Sultan Yahya Petra and Sultan Ismail Petra.

== Accession ==
Sultan Yahya Petra (as he became) succeeded his father a day after the latter's death on 9 July 1960. He was crowned on 17 July 1961 at Istana Balai Besar in Kota Bharu.

== Election as Deputy Yang di-Pertuan Agong ==
Sultan Yahya Petra served as the Deputy Yang di-Pertuan Agong, the federal deputy king, between 21 September 1970 and 20 September 1975.

== Election as Yang di-Pertuan Agong ==
During the election of the sixth Yang di-Pertuan Agong (King of Malaysia), the most senior ruler Sultan Ismail of Johor declined to be considered. Sultan Yahya Petra also declined nomination at first due to having suffered a serious stroke, but changed his mind and was duly elected. His term began from 21 September 1975.

== Kingship ==
Malaysia's second prime minister Abdul Razak Hussein died on 14 January 1976 less than four months into Sultan Yahya Petra's reign as Yang di-Pertuan Agong.

In 1977 a state of emergency was declared in his own state following a political crisis and violence.

== Death and funeral ==
Sultan Yahya Petra died of an apparent heart attack at 3:45 pm at the National Palace on 29 March 1979. His coffin lay in state at the National Palace for a day and was then taken by plane to Kota Bharu where it was buried at the Kelantan Royal Mausoleum.

== Family life ==
He married Tengku Zainab binti Tengku Sri Utama Raja Tengku Muhammad Petra (1917–1993), who was styled Raja Perempuan Zainab II (her stepmother-in-law was Raja Perempuan Zainab I, consort of Sultan Ibrahim) and Raja Permaisuri Agong on 4 June 1939. Sultan Yahya Petra and Raja Perempuan Zainab II had one son and six daughters. However, two of their daughters died when they were young. He was also married to Tengku Alexandria binti Tengku Yusof and was given a son and two daughters.

== Issue ==
Name	Birth Date	Birth Place	Death Date	Death Place	Marriage Date	Spouse	Their children	Their grandchildren
Tengku Merjan	23 February 1940		15 October 2020 (aged 80)	Raja Perempuan Zainab II Hospital, Kota Bharu, Kelantan	22 January 1960	Tengku Abdul Aziz bin Tengku Muhammad Hamzah	Tengku Mohamad Rizam; Tengku Ramizan; Tengku Mohamad Rizal; Tengku Mohamad Ridzman	nine grandchildren
Tengku Rozan	25 December 1942		24 October 2026 (aged 83)	Raja Perempuan Zainab II Hospital, Kota Bharu, Kelantan	23 April 1969: Divorced	Tengku Mohamed Nasrun bin Tengku Yusof	Tengku Rozanna Petri; Tengku Rozlynda Petri	three grandchildren
Tengku Salwani	26 August 1944	Istana Batu, Kota Bharu, Kelantan	17 August 2026 (aged 81)	Raja Perempuan Zainab II Hospital, Kota Bharu, Kelantan	20 October 1966: Divorced	Raja Aman Shah bin Raja Shahar Shah	Raja Amir Saifuddin Shah	None
Tengku Rohani	14 October 1947		31 December 2021 (aged 74)	Raja Perempuan Zainab II Hospital, Kota Bharu, Kelantan	None	None	None	None
Tengku Ismail Petra	11 November 1949	Istana Jahar, Kota Bharu, Kelantan	28 September 2019 (aged 69)	Raja Perempuan Zainab II Hospital, Kota Bharu, Kelantan	4 December 1968	Tengku Anis binti Tengku Abdul Hamid	Tengku Muhammad Faris Petra; Tengku Muhammad Faiz Petra; Tengku Muhammad Fakhry Petra; Tengku Amalin A’ishah Putri	five grandchildren
Tengku Mohamed	1967		8 June 2025 (aged 57–58)	Raja Perempuan Zainab II Hospital, Kota Bharu, Kelantan	unknown	unknown	four children	unknown
Tengku Maziah					unknown	Azman bin Ismail	two children	unknown
Tengku Zubaidah					unknown	Nordin bin Talib	unknown	unknown

== Awards and recognitions ==
Sultan Yahya Petra held the rank of Marshal of the Royal Malaysian Air Force.

=== Honours of Kelantan ===
- Recipient (21 July 1939) and Grand Master (1960–1979) of the Royal Family Order of Kelantan or "Star of Yunus" (DK)
- Knight Grand Commander (SPMK, 9 August 1950) and Grand Master (1960–1979) of the Order of the Crown of Kelantan or "Star of Muhammad"
- Knight Grand Commander (SJMK, 9 August 1959) and Grand Master (1960–1979) of the Order of the Life of the Crown of Kelantan or "Star of Ismail"
- Founding Grand Master and Knight Grand Commander of the Order of the Loyalty to the Crown of Kelantan or "Star of Ibrahim" (SPSK, 10 December 1967 – 29 March 1979)
- Grand Master of the Order of the Most Distinguished and Most Valiant Warrior (PYGP, 9 July 1960 – 29 March 1979)

=== Honours of Malaysia ===
- Malaysia
  - Recipient of Order of the Royal House of Malaysia (DKM) (1975-1979)
  - Recipient (17 July 1961) and Grand Master (1975-1979) of the Order of the Crown of the Realm (DMN)
  - Grand Master (1975–1979) of the Order of the Defender of the Realm
  - Grand Master (1975–1979) of the Order of Loyalty to the Crown of Malaysia
  - Grand Master (1975–1979) of the Order of Merit of Malaysia
  - Grand Master (1979–1979) of the Order of the Royal Household of Malaysia
  - Grand Commander of the Order of the Defender of the Realm (SMN) – Tun (31 August 1958)
  - Recipient of the Malaysian Commemorative Medal (Gold) (PPM) (1965)
- Kedah
  - Member of the Royal Family Order of Kedah (DK) (5 July 1969)
- Pahang
  - Member 1st class of the Family Order of the Crown of Indra of Pahang (DK I)
- Perlis
  - Recipient of the Perlis Family Order of the Gallant Prince Syed Putra Jamalullail (DK) (13 February 1978)
- Selangor
  - First Class of the Royal Family Order of Selangor (DK I) (21 July 1966)
- Terengganu
  - Member first class of the Family Order of Terengganu (DK I) (23 June 1964)
- Sarawak
  - Knight Grand Commander of the Order of the Star of Hornbill Sarawak (DP) – Datuk Patinggi

=== Foreign ===
- Brunei
  - First Class of the Family Order of Laila Utama (DK) – Dato Laila Utama (1961)
- United Kingdom
  - Honorary Companion of the Order of St Michael and St George (CMG) (1952)
  - Recipient of the Queen Elizabeth II Coronation Medal (1953)
  - Honorary Knight Grand Cross of the Order of St Michael and St George (GCMG) (1972)

=== Places named after him ===
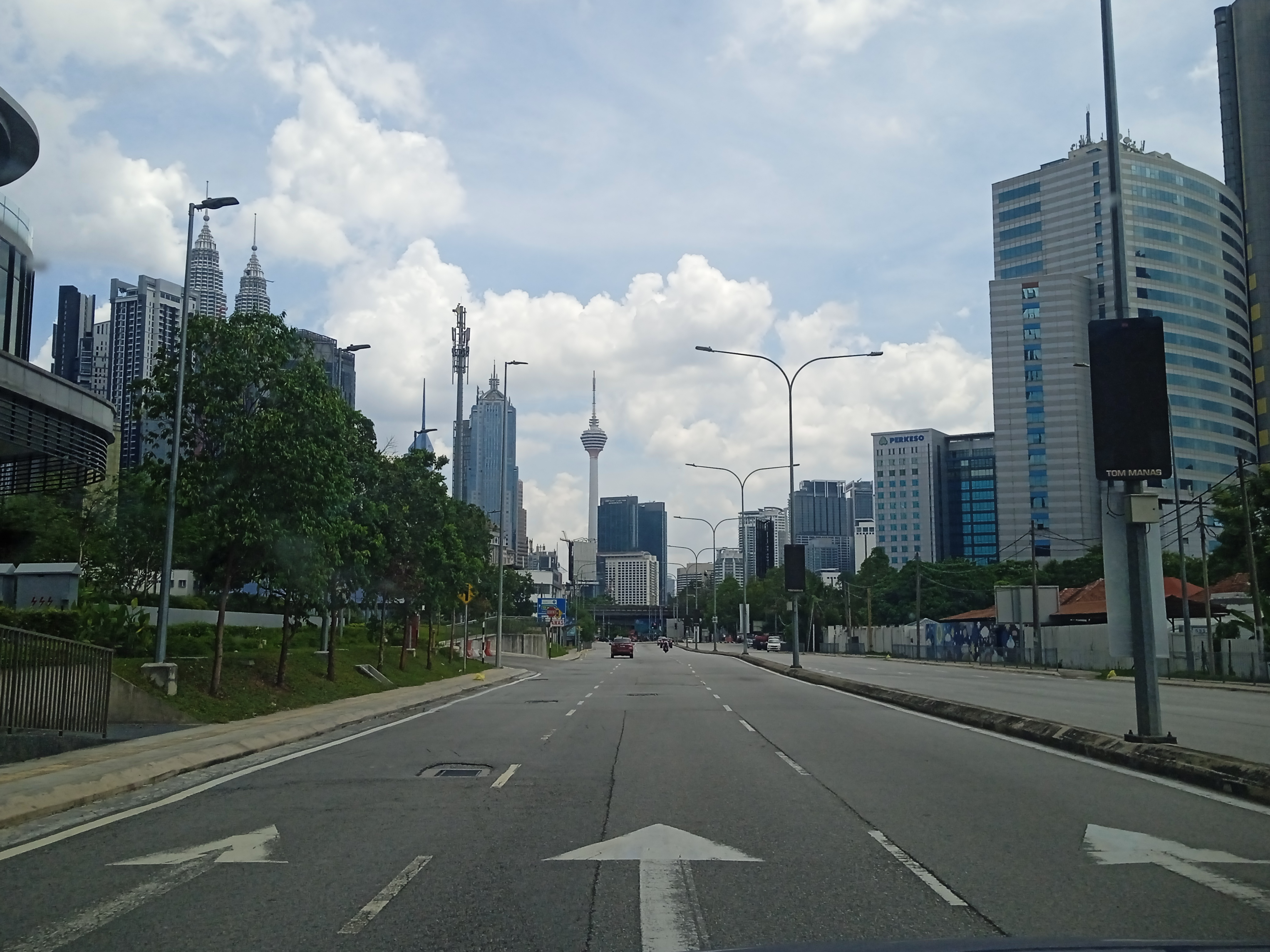
Jalan Sultan Yahya Petra, major road in Kuala Lumpur

Several places were named after him, including:

- Petra Jaya, a suburb in Kuching, Sarawak
- Jalan Sultan Yahya Petra, Kuala Lumpur (formerly Jalan Semarak/Jalan Henry Gurney)
- Jalan Tuanku Yahya Petra, the main road on Penang Hill
- Jalan Sultan Yahya Petra in Kota Bharu, Kelantan
- Sultan Yahya Petra Mosque in Machang, Kelantan
- SK Sultan Yahya Petra (1), a primary school in Kuala Krai, Kelantan
- SK Sultan Yahya Petra (2), a primary school in Kuala Krai, Kelantan
- SMK Sultan Yahya Petra 1, a secondary school in Kuala Krai, Kelantan
- SMK Sultan Yahya Petra 2, a secondary school in Kuala Krai, Kelantan
- Sultan Yahya Petra Bridge in Kota Bharu, Kelantan
- Sultan Yahya Petra Second Bridge in Kota Bharu, Kelantan

== Notes ==
Regnal titles
Preceded by Tuanku Abdul Halim (Sultan of Kedah)	Yang di-Pertuan Agong (King of Malaysia); 1975–1979	Succeeded by Sultan Ahmad Shah (Sultan of Pahang)
Preceded by Ibrahim IV of Kelantan	Sultan of Kelantan; 1960–1979	Succeeded by Ismail II Petra of Kelantan
