= Mohamed Suffian Mohamed Hashim =

Malaysian barrister

Yang Amat Berbahagia Tun Mohamed Suffian Mohamed Hashim SSM PSM SPCM DIMP JMN SMB PJK
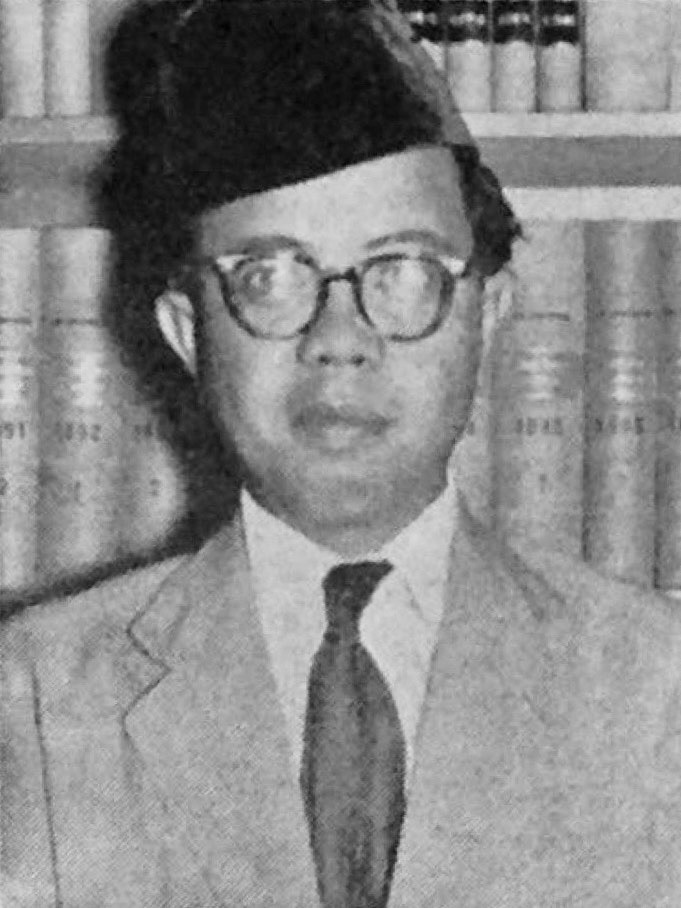
- Suffian in c. 1959

Lord President of the Federal Court
- In office 1 May 1974 – 12 November 1982
- Preceded by: Azmi Mohamed
- Succeeded by: Raja Azlan Shah

Personal details
- Born: 12 November 1917 Kota Lama Kiri, Kuala Kangsar, Perak, Federated Malay States, British Malaya (now Malaysia)
- Died: 26 September 2000 (aged 82) Petaling Jaya, Selangor, Malaysia
- Resting place: Al-Ghufran Royal Mausoleum, Kuala Kangsar, Perak
- Education: Gonville and Caius College, Cambridge
- Profession: Barrister

Mohamed Suffian bin Mohamed Hashim (12 November 1917 – 26 September 2000) was a Malaysian barrister, eventually serving as Lord President of the Federal Court from 1974 to 1982. He had previously served as Chief Justice of Malaya.

Suffian was born in 1917 in Kota Lama Kiri, a small village on the banks of Sungai Perak near Kuala Kangsar and went to the Malay School, Lenggong and Clifford School, Kuala Kangsar, before going to England on a Queen's scholarship in 1936.

During World War II, unable to return home from England because of the Japanese Occupation, he worked as a news broadcaster and commentator with the All-India Radio, New Delhi, and later with the BBC in London where he acquired an interest in current affairs and in lucid writing.

== Education ==
Suffian read law at Gonville and Caius College, Cambridge before becoming a member of Middle Temple. He also held an honorary LL.D. from the National University of Singapore and an honorary D.Litt. from University of Malaya.

== Legacy ==
Suffian was widely regarded as a respected judicial figure who was a fierce defender of judiciary's independence.

=== 1982 Braddell Memorial Lecture ===
When speaking of the Malaysian judiciary to a Singapore audience he said:

In a multi-racial and multi-religious society like yours and mine, while we judges cannot help being Malay or Chinese or Indian; or being Muslim or Buddhist or Hindu or whatever, we strive not to be too identified with any particular race or religion – so that nobody reading our judgment with our name deleted could with confidence identify our race or religion, and so that the various communities, especially minority communities, are assured that we will not allow their rights to be trampled underfoot.

=== 1988 Judicial crisis ===
A one-sided public tribunal ratified the sacking of Salleh, while a second tribunal removed two of the senior judges from office. Few Malaysians dared speak out, but Suffian, to whom many turned for an impartial opinion, did not hold back. He said

"Those who stand by and do nothing to protect the independence of the judiciary, will in the end get the judiciary they deserve - one powerless to stand between them and tyranny."

Suffian had a long association with the Constitution of Malaysia, first with its drafting and then with its operation as a member of the Legal Department, and finally with its interpretation from 1961 when he was elevated to the bench of the Federal Court.

He had served as the Pro-Chancellor of University of Malaya.

== Publications ==
- Mohamed Hashim, Mohamed Suffian (1980). Parliamentary System Versus Presidential System: The Malaysian Experience. Malayan Law Journal.
- Mohamed Hashim, Mohamed Suffian (1982). Four Decades in the Law, Looking back. Malayan Law Journal. ISBN 978-9971700287.
- Mohamed Hashim, Mohamed Suffian (1988). An Introduction to the Legal System of Malaysia. Oxford Fajar.

== Personal life ==
Suffian married, in 1946, Dora Evelina ("Bunny") Grange (d.1997), an English farmer's daughter whom he had met at Cambridge in 1939. He had no children of his own.

== Death ==
He died on 26 September 2000 and was buried at the Al-Ghufran Royal Mausoleum near Ubudiah Mosque in Kuala Kangsar, Perak.

== Honours ==
=== Honours of Malaysia ===
- Malaya
  - Companion of the Order of the Defender of the Realm (JMN) (1961)
- Malaysia
  - Commander of the Order of Loyalty to the Crown of Malaysia (PSM) – Tan Sri (1967)
  - Grand Commander of the Order of Loyalty to the Crown of Malaysia (SSM) – Tun (1975)
- Pahang
  - Knight Companion of the Order of the Crown of Pahang (DIMP) – Dato' (1969)
- Perak
  - Knight Grand Commander of the Order of Cura Si Manja Kini (SPCM) – Dato' Seri (1978)

=== Foreign honours ===
- Brunei
  - Third Class of the Order of Seri Paduka Mahkota Brunei (SMB) (23 September 1959)

=== Magsaysay Award ===
- In 1975, his outstanding record as a public servant won international recognition in Manila, the Philippines, where he received a Magsaysay Award, regarded as the Asian equivalent of the Nobel Prize.

== Bibliography ==
- An Introduction to the Constitution of Malaysia, Tun Mohamed Suffian Hashim, 1976.
- "BIOGRAPHY of Mohamed Suffian Bin Hashim". Retrieved 25 December 2006.

Preceded by Mohamed Azmi Mohamed	Lord President of the Federal Court; 1974–1982	Succeeded by Raja Azlan Shah
