= Yang di-Pertuan Besar =

Title given to the head of state

Yang di-Pertuan Besar or Yamtuan Besar (Malay: Yang di-Pertuan Besar, literally "He Who Is Made Chief Ruler") is a title given to the head of state in parts of the Malay Archipelago.

== In Malaysia ==
- Also known as Yamtuan Besar of Negeri Sembilan, it is the title of the elected monarch of the state of Negeri Sembilan in Malaysia. The monarch is himself one of the nine Malay rulers and electors of the federal Yang di-Pertuan Agong (King of Malaysia).
- It is a subsidiary title of the Sultan of Kedah, the Sultan of Kelantan, the Sultan of Perak and the Sultan of Terengganu.
- Other historical figures, especially the monarchs of the ancient Johor Empire (c. 17th–19th century), had the title used to differentiate from the "Yang di-Pertuan Muda" ("Under King"), who was usually Bugis rather than Malay. However, this was a secondary title, with the primary title being sultan.
- In Terengganu, after Sultan Zainal Abidin I died, his youngest son, Sultan Mansur Riayat Shah I was enthroned as Sultan with the title Yang di-Pertuan Kecil (during his minority), while his oldest son, Ku Tanang Wangsa held the Yang di-Pertuan Besar title equivalent to Regent.

== In Indonesia ==
- In colonial Indonesia, the governor-general of the Dutch East Indies was styled: Yang Mulia Sri Paduka Yang Dipertuan Besar.
- Secondary title of the Sultans of Asahan (in Sumatra), Sultan of Riau-Lingga and Sultan of Siak Sri Indrapura (the latter two are located Sumatra, which were broke off from the Johor Empire)
- The original title of the Tuan Besar of Kubu (in the Indonesian province of Borneo)
