= Yang di-Pertua Negeri =

Title of some State rulers in Malaysia

The Governor, officially Yang di-Pertua Negeri (Jawi: يڠ دڤرتوا نݢري, lit. 'He Who is Made Head of the State') is the constitutional head of state for the four Malaysian states without a ruler, namely Penang, Malacca, Sabah and Sarawak. This is in contrast with the ruler (Malay: Raja), who serves as the constitutional monarch and head of state of the nine Malay states. These rulers are the Sultans of Johor, Kedah, Kelantan, Pahang, Perak, Selangor and Terengganu; the Raja of Perlis; and the Yang di-Pertuan Besar of Negeri Sembilan.

== Terminology and functions ==
The Yang di-Pertua Negeri (Governor) is appointed to a renewable four-year terms by the King of Malaysia after consulting with the chief minister, or in the case of Sarawak, the premier.

There are two major distinctions between the constitutional roles of the Malay rulers and the Yang di-Pertua Negeri. While the Yang di-Pertua Negeri are members of the Conference of Rulers, they cannot participate in the election of the Yang di-Pertuan Agong, discussions related to the privileges of the Malay rulers and matters concerning the observance of Islam. In addition, the Yang di-Pertua Negeri does not function as Head of Islam in their states; the role is fulfilled by the Yang di-Pertuan Agong. Stylistically, states with rulers appoint menteri besar (first minister) while the Yang di-Pertua Negeri appoints chief ministers or premier of their respective states. This convention was first started with the former Straits Settlements: Penang and Malacca, and subsequently extended to the Borneo States of Sabah and Sarawak. However, in 2022, Sarawak deviated from this convention by changing the title of chief minister to premier to reflect its status as one of the Borneo states which are of a different constitutional position than the States of Malaya as they are asymmetrically accorded more autonomy. This move is similar to how Singapore retained the title of Prime Minister for the head of government (which was first established after it gained self-independence from the United Kingdom in 1959) when it became a state of the federation as it was the state with the most autonomy. Sabah, as of yet, remains the title of chief minister.

== Powers and responsibilities ==
Yang di-Pertua Negeri functions as the head of state in a parliamentary democracy. Their discretionary roles include appointing the head of government, the chief minister (Malay: Ketua Menteri) or premier, who is usually the leader of the party with a majority in the state legislature, and withholding consent to dissolve the state legislature. On all other matters, they must act on the advice of the chief minister/premier, such as appointing the members of the Executive Council in Penang and Malacca, and the Cabinet in Sabah and Sarawak, conferring state honours and granting pardons for offences committed in their state—except pardons for court martial and syariah offences, which are granted by the Yang di-Pertuan Agong.

== History ==
Prior to 1976, the heads of state of Penang, Malacca and Sarawak were titled as "Governor" (Malay: "Gabenor"), whereas the head of state of Sabah was titled "Yang di-Pertua Negara" (lit. 'He Who is Made Leader of the Nation') in both languages. Meanwhile, the head of state in Singapore was titled "Yang di-Pertuan Negara" (lit. 'He Who is Made Ruler of the Nation' in Malay) in both English and Malay which was also first established after achieving self-independence in 1959.

After the formation of Malaysia in 1963, upon adopting new state constitutions, Sarawak retained the title of Governor passed down from the British colonial rule, Sabah created a new title called the Yang di-Pertua Negara, while Singapore retained the title of Yang di-Pertuan Negara passed down from the period self-governance.

After the Federation of Malaya achieved independence in 1957, "Governor" referred to the heads of state of the former Straits Settlements, Penang and Malacca. When Malaysia was formed, the previous definition of Governor was extended to the states of Sabah, Sarawak and Singapore in the newly promulgated Federal Constitution. This means that constitutionally speaking, the heads of state in all the states without a ruler: Penang, Malacca, Sabah, Sarawak and Singapore, were of the same constitutional role, regardless of the style of name. When Singapore was expelled from Malaysia to become an independent republic, the office of Yang di-Pertuan Negara was eventually replaced with the office of President.

Since 1976, the title for the heads of state of Penang, Malacca, Sabah and Sarawak were made uniform as Yang di-Pertua Negeri for their governorships.

== List of the current Yang di-Pertua Negeri ==
The following is a table of Yang di-Pertua Negeri (Governor) of each state:

| State | Portrait | Yang di-Pertua Negeri (Birth) | Term of office | | List of Yang di-Pertua Negeri |
| State | Portrait | Yang di-Pertua Negeri (Birth) | Took office | Time in office | List of Yang di-Pertua Negeri |
|---|---|---|---|---|---|
| Malacca | | Tun Seri Setia Dr. Mohd Ali Mohd Rustam (born 1949) | 4 June 2020 | 6 years, 106 days | List |
| Penang | | Tun Dato' Seri DiRaja; Ramli Ngah Talib (born 1941) | 1 May 2025 | 1 year, 140 days | List |
| Sabah | | Tun Datuk Seri Panglima; Musa Aman (born 1951) | 1 January 2025 | 1 year, 260 days | List |
| Sarawak | | Tun Pehin Sri Dr. Haji; Wan Junaidi Tuanku Jaafar (born 1946) | 26 January 2024 | 2 years, 235 days | List |

== See also ==
- Yang di-Pertuan Agong
- Yang di-Pertuan Besar
- Yang di-Pertuan Negara
