= 1964 in Malaysia =

- Decades: 1960s; 1970s; 1980s
- See also: Other events of 1964; History of Malaysia • Timeline • Years

This article lists important figures and events in Malaysian public affairs during the year 1964, together with births and deaths of significant Malaysians.

== Incumbent political figures ==
=== Federal level ===
- Yang di-Pertuan Agong: Tuanku Syed Putra of Perlis
- Raja Permaisuri Agong: Tengku Budriah of Perlis
- Prime Minister: Tunku Abdul Rahman Putra Al-Haj
- Deputy Prime Minister: Datuk Abdul Razak
- Lord President: James Beveridge Thomson

=== State level ===
- Sultan of Johor: Sultan Ismail
- Sultan of Kedah: Sultan Abdul Halim Muadzam Shah
- Sultan of Kelantan: Sultan Yahya Petra
- Raja of Perlis: Tuanku Syed Sirajuddin (Regent)
- Sultan of Perak: Sultan Idris Shah II
- Sultan of Pahang: Sultan Abu Bakar
- Sultan of Selangor: Sultan Salahuddin Abdul Aziz Shah
- Sultan of Terengganu: Sultan Ismail Nasiruddin Shah (Deputy Yang di-Pertuan Agong)
- Yang di-Pertuan Besar of Negeri Sembilan: Tuanku Munawir
- Yang di-Pertua Negeri (Governor) of Penang: Tun Raja Uda
- Yang di-Pertua Negeri (Governor) of Malacca: Tun Haji Abdul Malek bin Yusuf
- Yang di-Pertua Negeri (Governor) of Sarawak: Tun Abang Haji Openg
- Yang di-Pertua Negeri (Governor) of Sabah: Tun Datu Mustapha
- Yang di-Pertua Negeri (Governor) of Singapore: Tun Yusof Ishak

== Events ==
- February – Construction of the Pekeliling Flats commenced.
- March – The 1964 General Elections.
- July – Famous Malay film actor, director and songwriter, P. Ramlee and his wife Saloma were moved from Singapore to Kuala Lumpur.
- 21 July – The Singapore Race Riots.
- 16 September - Malaysia (1st Anniversary) 1964 - Setahun Di Malaysia

First Anniversary of Malaysia day Malaysia's Seyear Day

- 10 October – Eleanor Roosevelt was commemorated on a Malaysian stamp.
- 10–24 October – Malaysia competed at the 1964 Summer Olympics in Rome, Italy. 62 competitors took part in ten sports.

== Births ==
- 2 January – Noriah Kasnon, politician (died 2016)
- 12 February – Azhar Idrus, Malaysian Islamic preacher and lecturer
- 15 April – Bob Lokman, actor, comedian and lyricist (died 2022)
- 30 April – Tony Fernandes, Malaysian entrepreneur and the founder of Tune Air Sdn. Bhd (Air Asia)
- 4 June – Normala Samsudin, former TV3 newscaster and personality
- 5 July – Lee Ee Hoe, businessman
- 8 July – Rodziah Ismail, politician
- 21 August – Salamiah Mohd Nor, politician

== Deaths ==
- 6 May – Zulkifli Muhammad, former Deputy President of the Malaysian Islamic Party and Member of Parliament for Bachok (b. 1927).
- 31 May – Ong Seok Kim, entrepreneur and philanthropist (b. 1884).
- 20 June – Loke Wan Tho, business magnate and founder of Cathay Organisation (b. 1915).
- 16 August – Nik Mahmud Nik Ismail, 10th Menteri Besar of Kelantan (b. 1882).
- 1 September – Mohamed Noordin Mastan, UMNO Member of Parliament for Seberang Selatan (b. 1902).

== See also ==
- 1964
- 1963 in Malaysia | 1965 in Malaysia
- History of Malaysia
