= 1895 in Malaya =

- Decades
- See also: Other events of 1895; History of Malaysia • Timeline • Years

Events from the year 1895 in Malaya.

== Incumbents ==
- Monarch – Victoria

== Events ==
- February 1895 – Pudu Prison has its final construction stage and is completed in the same year, used as the central prison in Selangor and Federated Malay States. Ellen serves as the prison's governor.

1:2. Flag of the Federated Malay States (1895–1946)

- 1895 – British Government establishes the Federated Malay States, that including the four states in Malaya:
- Perak;
- Selangor;
- Negeri Sembilan;
- Pahang.

== Births ==
- 12 February – Onn Jaafar, 7th Menteri Besar of Johor and 1st President of United Malays National Organisation (d. 1962)
- 24 August – Tuanku Abdul Rahman, 1st Yang di-Pertuan Agong of Malaya (d. 1960)
- 16 September – Zainal Abidin Ahmad, Malaysian writer and linguist (d. 1973)
- 1 December – Sulaiman Badrul Alam Shah of Terengganu, 15th Sultan of Terengganu (d. 1942)

== Deaths ==
- 4 June – Sultan Abu Bakar, 1st Sultan of Modern Johor (b. 1833)

== See also ==
- 1894 in Malaya
- 1896 in Malaya
- History of Malaysia
