= 1962 in Malaya =

- Decades: 1940s; 1950s; 1960s
- See also: Other events of 1962; History of Malaysia • Timeline • Years

This article lists important figures and events in Malayan public affairs during the year 1962, together with births and deaths of significant Malayans.

== Incumbent political figures ==
=== Federal level ===
- Yang di-Pertuan Agong: Tuanku Syed Putra of Perlis
- Raja Permaisuri Agong: Tuanku Budririah of Perlis
- Prime Minister: Tunku Abdul Rahman Putra Al-Haj
- Deputy Prime Minister: Datuk Abdul Razak

=== State level ===
- Sultan of Johor: Sultan Ismail
- Sultan of Kedah: Sultan Abdul Halim Muadzam Shah
- Sultan of Kelantan: Sultan Yahya Petra
- Raja of Perlis: Tuanku Syed Sirajuddin (Regent)
- Sultan of Perak: Sultan Yusuf Izzuddin Shah
- Sultan of Pahang: Sultan Abu Bakar
- Sultan of Selangor: Sultan Salahuddin Abdul Aziz Shah
- Sultan of Terengganu: Sultan Ismail Nasiruddin Shah (Deputy Yang di-Pertuan Agong)
- Yang di-Pertuan Besar of Negeri Sembilan: Tuanku Munawir
- Yang di-Pertua Negeri (Governor) of Penang: Raja Tun Uda
- Yang di-Pertua Negeri (Governor) of Malacca: Tun Leong Yew Koh

(Source: Malaysian Department of Informations)

== Events ==
- 19 January – Dato' Onn Jaafar the founder of UMNO died. His body was laid to rest at Makam Mahmoodiah, Johor Bahru.
- 19 January – Parti Negara was dissolved after the death of Dato' Onn Jaafar.
- February – The Cobbold Commission was established.
- 7 April – The World United Against Malaria campaign was commemorated on a Malayan stamp.
- 10 April – Stadium Negara, Malaya's first indoor stadium was officially opened.
- 21 April – The United Democratic Party (Malaysia) was founded (dissolved in 1968).
- 17 May – The Institut Pendidikan Guru Kampus Pendidikan Teknik Cheras was established.
- 1 October – Free primary education was introduced in Malaya.
- 24 August – 4 September – Malaya competed at the 1962 Asian Games held in Jakarta, Indonesia and ranked eighth overall with two gold medals, four silver medals and nine bronze medals.
- 1 September – The Singaporean integration referendum was held in preparation for the formation of Malaysia.
- 13 September – Tan Sri Aishah Ghani became the first woman appointed as senator.
- 11 September – Tun Abdul Razak Hussein represented the country at the Commonwealth Prime Minister's Conference in London.
- 22 November – 1 December – Malaya competed at the 1962 British Empire and Commonwealth Games in Perth, Western Australia and won a bronze medal in weightlifting sports.
- 24 December - Beginning of a three-week strike by staff of the Malayan Railways over wages. It is the longest industrial action in Malayan history to date. The strike ended on 16 January the following year.
- Unknown date – Darul Aman Stadium, Kedah was officially opened.
- Unknown date – Minconsult, a private limited engineering consultancy was founded. One of its notable projects was Sultan Salahuddin Abdul Aziz Power Station.
- Unknown date – SMK Aminuddin Baki, Johor Bahru was established.
- Unknown date – Tasek Corporation Berhad was founded as Tasek Cement Limited, one of Malaysia's largest cement producers.

== Sports ==
- 8–9 September – 1962 Merdeka Tournament
- 16–17 September – 1962 Malayan Grand Prix. The first Malaysian Grand Prix held.
- Unknown date – 1962 Malaysia Cup

== Births ==
- 22 January – Sultan Mizan Zainal Abidin of Terengganu – 13th Yang di-Pertuan Agong (2006–2011)
- 29 January – Karamjit Singh – Malaysian Number 1 rally driver
- 19 March – Norsehah binti Abu Bakar – Freedom Group singer (died 2006)
- 22 March – Zambry Abdul Kadir – Menteri Besar of Perak (2009–2018)
- 18 April – Nassier Wahab – Singer (died 2019)
- 12 May – Nordin Mohamed Jadi – Former Malaysian track sprinter
- 15 May – Suhaimi Sulaiman – TV personality
- 15 May – Zulkiflee Anwar Haque (Zunar) – Cartoonist
- 27 May – Wahid Omar – Malaysia lecturer
- 29 May – Razif Sidek – Badminton player
- 29 July – Nor Zamani Abdol Hamid – Politician
- 6 August – Michelle Yeoh – International actress
- 24 August – Saw Teong Hin – Director
- 1 September – Robert Tawik – Politician
- 2 October – Aziz M. Osman – Actor and director
- 3 October – Siti Ashah Ghazali – Politician
- 6 October – Adham Baba – Politician
- 10 October – Ogy Ahmad Daud – Actress
- 6 November – Aznil Nawawi – Popular host TV
- 5 December – Jafri Malin Abdullah – Scientist

== Deaths ==
- 15 January – Shenton Thomas, last Governor of the Straits Settlements and 9th High Commissioner for the Federated Malay States (b. 1879).
- 19 January – Dato' Onn Jaafar, 7th Menteri Besar of Johor and 1st President of the United Malays National Organisation (b. 1895).
- 25 February – Tengku Muhammad Hamzah Tengku Zainal Abidin, 12th Menteri Besar of Kelantan (b. 1909).
- 14 May – Heah Joo Seang, politician, business leader, rubber magnate and philanthropist (b. 1899).
- 24 August – Mohamed Sulong Mohd. Ali, UMNO Member of Parliament for Lipis (b. 1908).
- 27 September – Mohamad Sheriff Osman, 1st Menteri Besar of Kedah (b. 1890).
- 30 September – Yong Mun Sen, watercolour artist (b. 1896).
- 14 November – Dato' Sayyid Alwi Thahir al-Haddad, former Johor State Mufti (b. 1884).

== See also ==
- 1962
- 1961 in Malaya | 1963 in Malaysia
- History of Malaysia
