= 1965 in Malaysia =

- Decades: 1960s; 1970s; 1980s
- See also: Other events of 1965; History of Malaysia • Timeline • Years

This article lists important figures and events in Malaysian public affairs during the year 1965, together with births and deaths of significant Malaysians. Singapore left the Federation of Malaysia on 9 August.

Flag of Singapore, Singapore was expelled from the Federation of Malaysia on 9 August 1965.

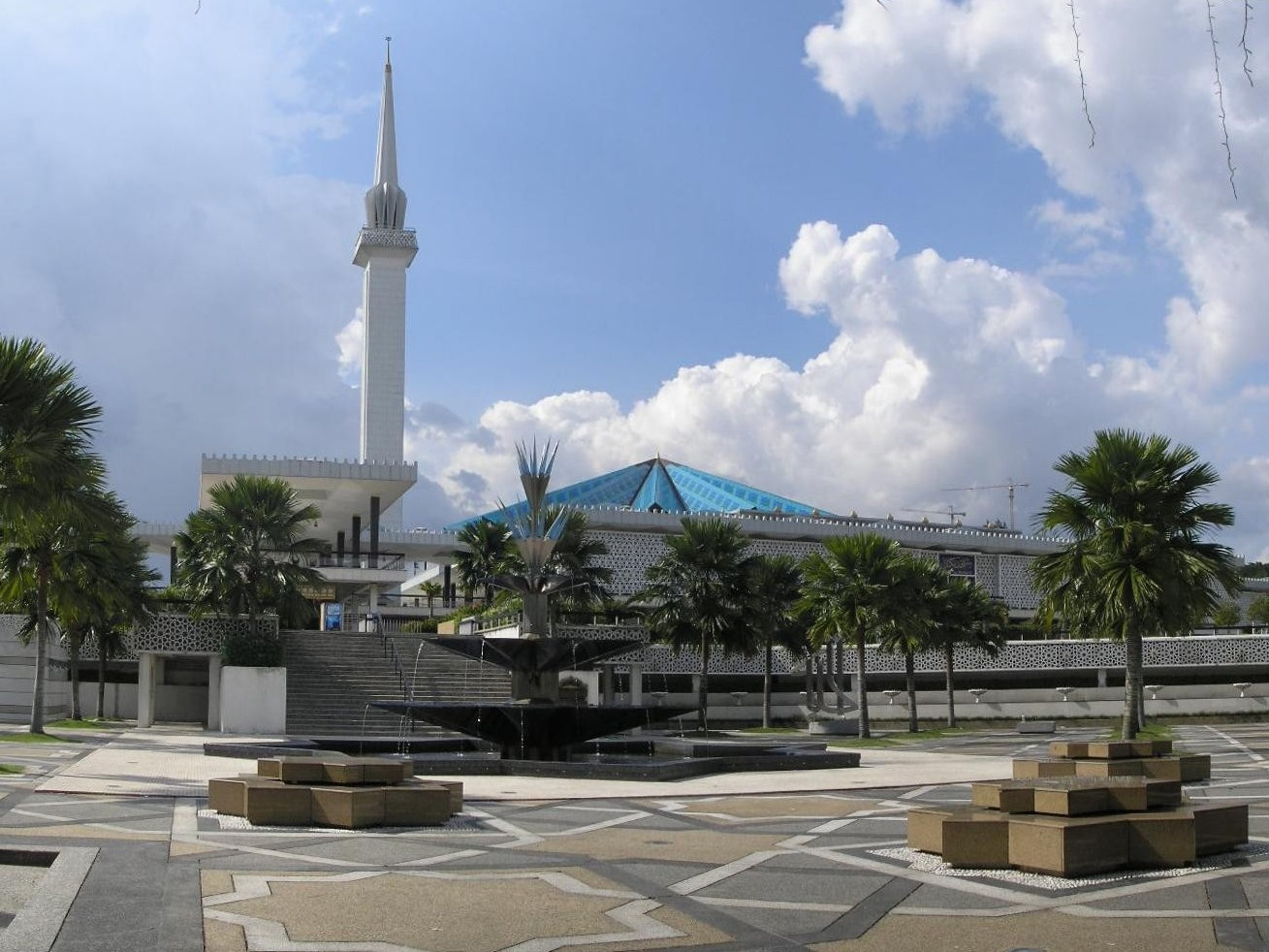
The Masjid Negara, National Mosque of Malaysia, one of the largest mosques in East Asia

== Incumbent political figures ==
=== Federal level ===
- Yang di-Pertuan Agong:
  - Tuanku Syed Putra of Perlis (until 20 September)
  - Sultan Ismail Nasiruddin Shah of Terengganu (from 21 September)
- Raja Permaisuri Agong:
  - Tengku Budriah of Perlis (until 20 September)
  - Tengku Ampuan Intan Zaharah of Terengganu (from 21 September)
- Prime Minister: Tunku Abdul Rahman Putra Al-Haj
- Deputy Prime Minister: Datuk Abdul Razak
- Lord President: James Beveridge Thomson

=== State level ===
- Sultan of Johor: Sultan Ismail
- Sultan of Kedah: Sultan Abdul Halim Muadzam Shah (Deputy Yang di-Pertuan Agong)
- Sultan of Kelantan: Sultan Yahya Petra
- Raja of Perlis: Tuanku Syed Sirajuddin (Regent until 21 September)
- Sultan of Perak: Sultan Idris Shah II
- Sultan of Pahang: Sultan Abu Bakar
- Sultan of Selangor: Sultan Salahuddin Abdul Aziz Shah
- Sultan of Terengganu: Tengku Mahmud (Regent)
- Yang di-Pertuan Besar of Negeri Sembilan: Tuanku Munawir
- Yang di-Pertua Negeri (Governor) of Penang: Raja Tun Uda
- Yang di-Pertua Negeri (Governor) of Malacca: Tun Haji Abdul Malek bin Yusuf
- Yang di-Pertua Negeri (Governor) of Sarawak: Tun Abang Haji Openg
- Yang di-Pertua Negara (Governor) of Sabah:
  - Tun Datu Mustapha (until March)
  - Tun Pengiran Ahmad Raffae (until March)
- Yang di-Pertuan Negera (Governor) of Singapore: Tun Yusof Ishak (until 9 August)

== Events ==
- January – The International School of Kuala Lumpur (ISKL) was established.
- 17 May – Centenary of the International Telecommunication Union was celebrated.
- 29 May – A man named Pusok Anak Ngaik killed 14 people and wounded four others in Bukit Merah, a village near Sandakan, Sabah.
- 22 June – The Central Electricity Board (CEB) was renamed the Lembaga Letrik Negara (National Electricity Board) (LLN).
- August – Opening of the Jalan Kinabalu Flyover. It was the first flyover built in Malaysia after independence.
- 7 August – Tunku Abdul Rahman, Prime Minister of Malaysia, recommended the expulsion of Singapore from the Federation of Malaysia, negotiating its separation with Lee Kuan Yew, Prime Minister of the State of Singapore. The latter signed the agreement to secede.
- 9 August – Singapore was expelled from the Federation of Malaysia.
- 27 August – The National Mosque of Malaysia in Kuala Lumpur was officially opened.
- 30 August – The Subang Airport near Subang, Selangor was officially opened.
- 9 September – Malaysian national birds were recognized in a Malaysian stamp series.
- 21 September – Sultan Ismail Nasiruddin Shah of Terengganu was elected as the fourth Yang di-Pertuan Agong
- 14–21 December – The 1965 Southeast Asian Peninsular Games were held.

== Births ==
- 6 August – Dato' Seri Dr Mohd Khir Toyo – Menteri Besar of Selangor (2000–2008)
- 18 June – Hani Mohsin – Celebrity and the host of the TV gameshow of Wheel of Fortune's Malaysia version Roda Impian

== See also ==
- 1965
- 1964 in Malaysia | 1966 in Malaysia
- History of Malaysia
