= 1947 in Malaya =

- Decades: 1930s; 1940s; 1950s; 1960s
- See also: Other events of 1947; History of Malaysia • Timeline • Years

This article lists important figures and events in the public affairs of British Malaya during the year 1947, together with births and deaths of prominent Malayans. As the Malayan Union, Malaya was a British colony .

== Incumbent political figures ==
=== Central level ===
- Governor of Malaya Union :
  - Edward Gent

=== State level ===
- Perlis :
  - Raja of Perlis : Syed Harun Putra Jamalullail
- Johore :
  - Sultan of Johor : Sultan Ibrahim Al-Masyhur
- Kedah :
  - Sultan of Kedah : Sultan Badlishah
- Kelantan :
  - Sultan of Kelantan : Sultan Ibrahim
- Terengganu :
  - Sultan of Terengganu : Sultan Ismail Nasiruddin Shah
- Selangor :
  - Sultan of Selangor : Sultan Sir Hishamuddin Alam Shah Al-Haj
- Penang :
  - Monarchs : King George VI
  - Residents-Commissioner : Sydney Noel King
- Malacca :
  - Monarchs : King George VI
  - Residents-Commissioner :
    - Edward Victor Grace Day (until unknown date)
    - John Falconer (from unknown date)
- Negri Sembilan :
  - Yang di-Pertuan Besar of Negeri Sembilan : Tuanku Abdul Rahman ibni Almarhum Tuanku Muhammad
- Pahang :
  - Sultan of Pahang : Sultan Abu Bakar
- Perak :
  - British Adviser of Perak : Arthur Vincent Aston
  - Sultan of Perak : Sultan Abdul Aziz Al-Mutasim Billah Shah Ibni Almarhum Raja Muda Musa I

== Events ==
- 1 May – Malaysia Airlines was established as Malayan Airways.
- 15 June – Hin Hua High School was founded.
- 23 August to 27 September – First post-World War II census is held, marking the final census under British rule
- 1 September – Marine Operation Force was established as Marine Police Force.
- 9 October – Eleven people are killed and ten are wounded in a stabbing at Bangi Komuter station.
- Unknown date – Tunku Kurshiah College was established as Malay Girls College.
- Unknown date – Malaysian Bar was founded. E. D. Shearn was appointed as first president.

== Births ==
- 3 February – Wan A. Rafar – Poet and essay writer
- 26 February – Zahari Hasib – Poet (died 2012)
- 15 May – Muhyiddin Yassin – Malaysian politician and former 10th Deputy Prime Minister of Malaysia (2009-2015)
- 2 June – Md Hashim bin Hussein – 18th Commander of Malaysian Armed Forces (1999-2002)
- 10 August – Anwar Ibrahim – Malaysian politician and former 7th Deputy Prime Minister of Malaysia (1993-1998)
- 11 August – Yahaya Ahmad – Former Chairman of DRB-HICOM (died 1997)
- 24 August – Nor Mohamed Yakcop – Politician
- 27 August – Zeti Akhtar Aziz – Former Governor Central Bank of Malaysia
- 13 September – Abdul Ajib Ahmad – Politician and former Menteri Besar of Johor (1982-1985; died 2011)
- 16 October – Patrick Teoh – Actor and radio announcer
- 17 October – Zahari Affandi – Writer and journalist
- 21 December - Abdul Muluk Daud – Writer
- Unknown date – Abdul Kadir Jasin – Author
- Unknown date – Chandra Muzaffar – Political analyst
- Unknown date – Samsudin Osman – Former Secretary of State

== See also ==
- 1947
- 1946 in Malaya | 1948 in Malaya
- History of Malaysia
