= 1940 in British Malaya =

- Decades: 1930s; 1940s; 1950s; 1960s
- See also: Other events of 1940; History of Malaysia • Timeline • Years

This article lists important figures and events in the public affairs of British Malaya during the year 1940, together with births and deaths of prominent Malayans.

== Incumbent political figures ==
=== Central level ===
  - Monarch : King George VI
- High Commissioner to the Malay States :
  - Shenton Whitelegge Thomas
- Federal Secretary of the Federated of Malay States :
  - Hugh Fraser
- Governor of Straits Settlements :
  - Shenton Whitelegge Thomas

=== State level ===
==== Straits Settlements ====
- (Straits Settlements) Penang :
  - Residents-Councillors : Arthur Mitchell Goodman
- (Straits Settlements) Malacca :
  - Residents-Councillors :

==== Federated Malay States ====
- Selangor :
  - British Residents of Selangor : G. M. Kidd
  - Sultan of Selangor : Sultan Sir Hishamuddin Alam Shah Al-Haj
- (Negeri Sembilan) Negri Sembilan :
  - British Residents of Negri Sembilan : John Vincent Cowgill
  - Yang di-Pertuan Besar of Negri Sembilan : Tuanku Abdul Rahman ibni Almarhum Tuanku Muhammad
- Pahang :
  - British Residents of Pahang : C. C. Brown
  - Sultan of Pahang : Sultan Abu Bakar
- Perak :
  - British Residents of Perak : Marcus Rex
  - Sultan of Perak : Sultan Abdul Aziz Al-Mutasim Billah Shah Ibni Almarhum Raja Muda Musa I

==== Other states ====
- Perlis :
  - Raja of Perlis : Syed Alwi Syed Saffi Jamalullail
- Johore :
  - Sultan of Johor : Sultan Ibrahim Al-Masyhur
- Kedah :
  - Sultan of Kedah : Abdul Hamid Halim Shah
- Kelantan :
  - Sultan of Kelantan : Sultan Ismail Sultan Muhammad IV
- (Terengganu) Trengganu :
  - Sultan of Trengganu : Sulaiman Badrul Alam Shah

== Events ==
- 25 October – Chinese High School was established in Batu Pahat, Johor.
- Unknown date – Kinta Rubber Works, the first manufacturer of rubber products in Malaysia was established in Ipoh, Perak.
- Unknown date – Lam Eng Rubber (M) company, a Malaysian manufacturer of natural rubber, was founded.
- Unknown date – Malaysian Nature Society was founded.
- Unknown date – The Board of Commissioners of Currency, Malaya printed an issue of paper money with denominations of one, five and ten dollars; the colours of these banknotes were green, blue, and purple, respectively.

== Births ==
- 11 March – Haron Din – Politician (died 2016)
- 28 June – Karpal Singh – Malaysian politician and lawyer (died 2014)
- 29 July – Mohamad Aziz – Politician
- 17 August – Joseph Pairin Kitingan – Former 7th Chief Minister of Sabah
- 15 September – Abu Hassan Omar – 12th Menteri Besar Selangor
- 24 December – Endon Mahmood – Wife to former Prime Minister of Malaysia, Tun Abdullah Ahmad Badawi (died 2005)
- Unknown date – Asmah Haji Omar – Writer
- Unknown date – Wan Chik Daud – Actor

== Deaths ==
- 19 January – Leong Sin Nam, businessman and tin miner owner (b. 1880).
- 4 October – Leong Kan, merchant and tin miner (b. 1890).
