= 1963 in Malaysia =

- Decades: 1960s; 1970s; 1980s
- See also: Other events of 1963; History of Malaysia • Timeline • Years

This article lists important figures and events in Malayan and Malaysia public affairs during the year 1963, together with births and deaths of significant Malaysians. The Federation of Malaya merged with North Borneo, Sarawak and Singapore to form Malaysia on 16 September.

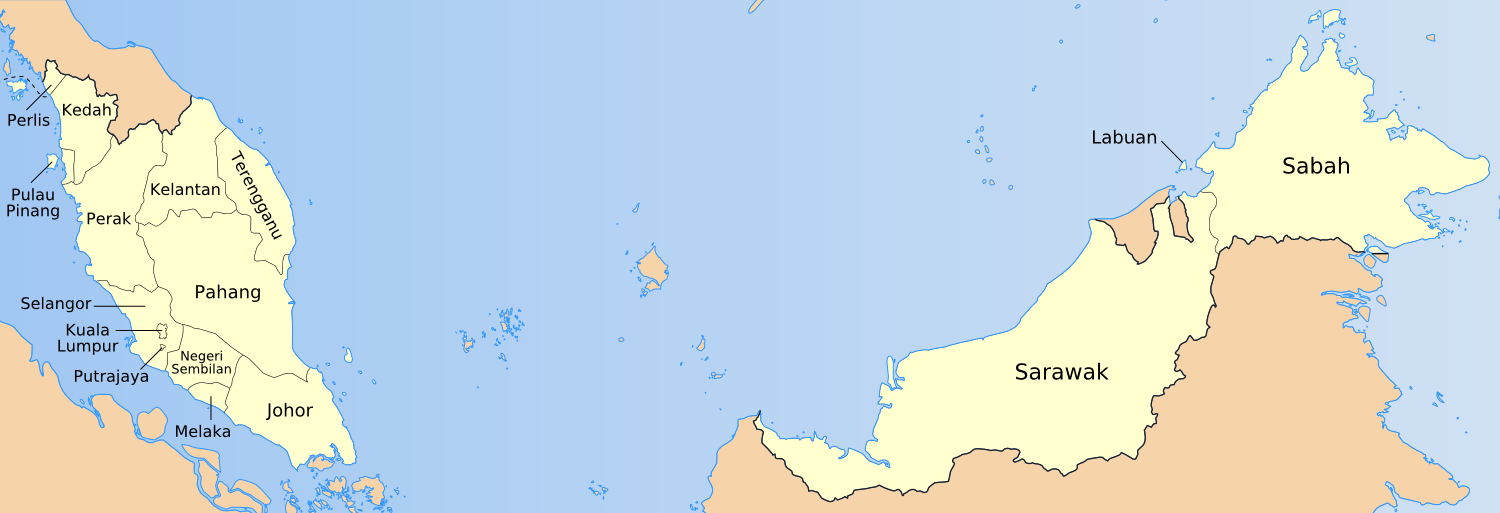
Map of the states of Malaysia

Flag of Malaysia (since 16 September 1963)

Coat of arms of Malaysia (1963–1965)

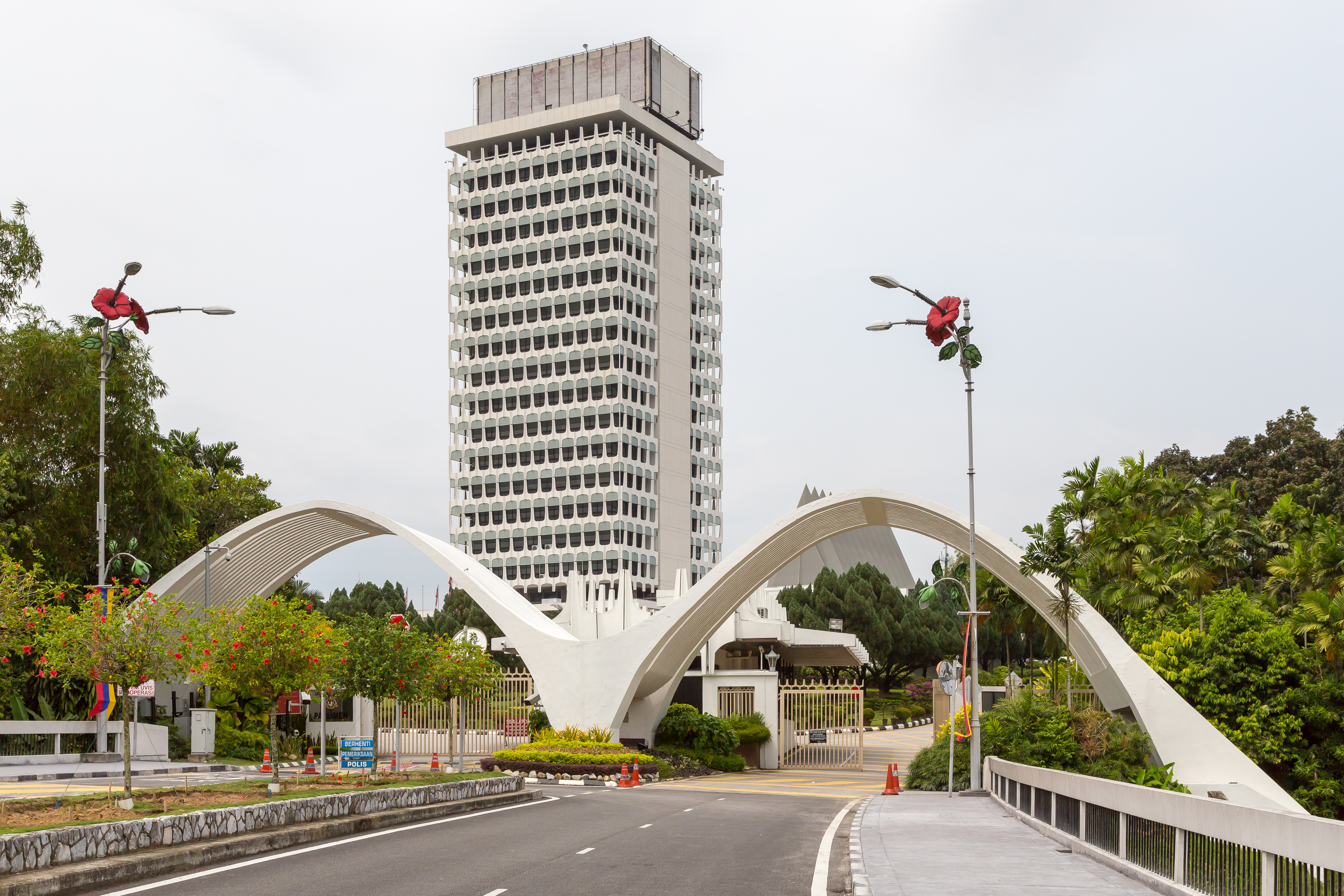
The Malaysian Parliament building.

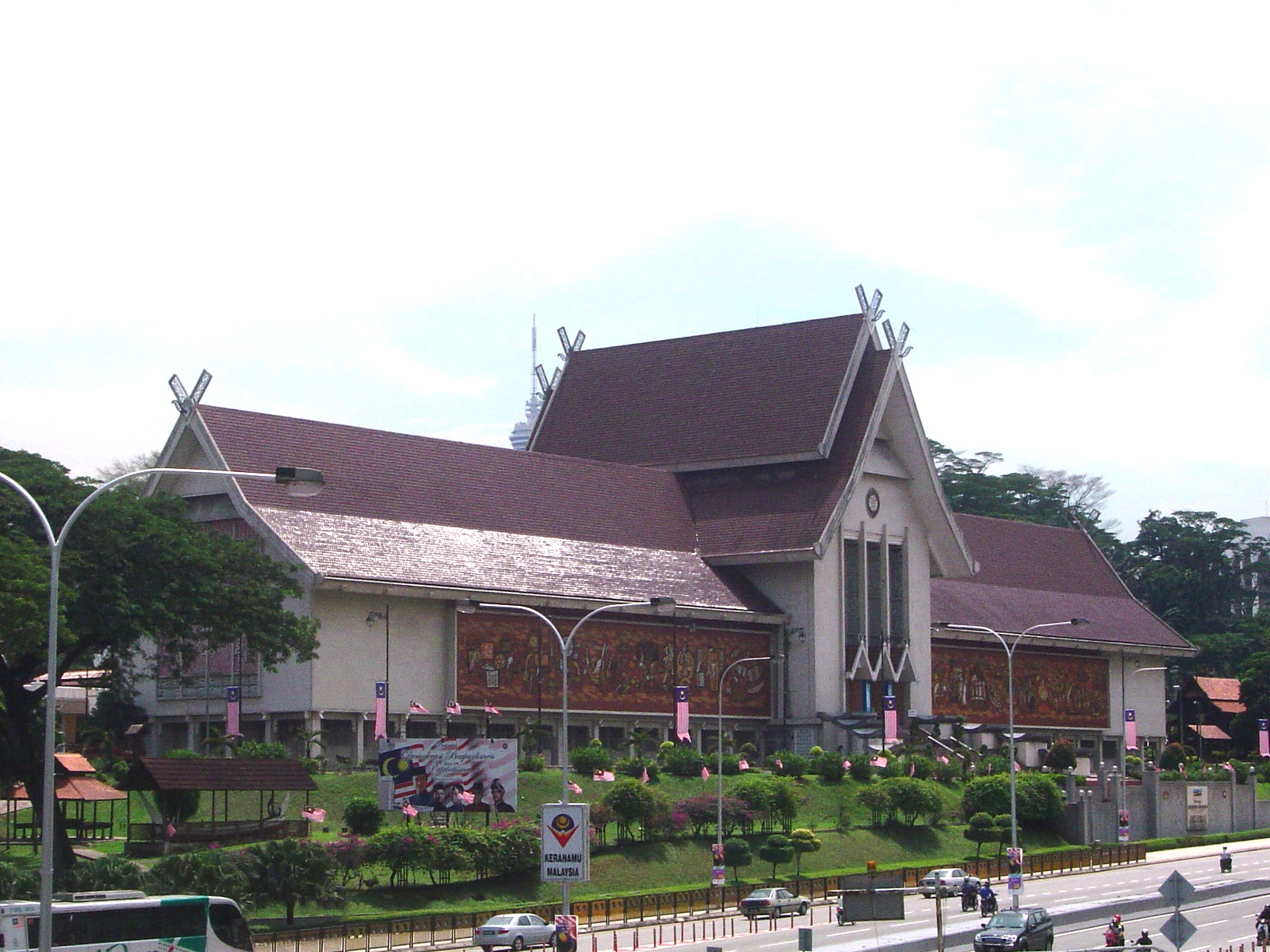
The Muzium Negara.

== Incumbent political figures ==
=== Federal level ===
- Yang di-Pertuan Agong: Tuanku Syed Putra of Perlis
- Raja Permaisuri Agong: Tengku Budriah of Perlis
- Deputy Yang di-Pertuan Agong: Sultan Ismail Nasiruddin Shah of Terengganu
- Prime Minister: Tunku Abdul Rahman Putra Al-Haj
- Deputy Prime Minister: Tun Abdul Razak Hussein
- President of the Dewan Negara: Abdul Rahman Mohamed Yassin
- Speaker of the Dewan Rakyat: Mohamed Noah Omar
- Lord President: James Beveridge Thomson

=== State level ===
- Johor
  - Sultan of Johor: Sultan Ismail Al-Khalidi
  - Menteri Besar of Johor: Hassan Yunus
- Kedah
  - Sultan of Kedah: Sultan Abdul Halim Mu'adzam Shah
  - Menteri Besar of Kedah: Syed Omar Syed Abdullah Shahabuddin
- Kelantan
  - Sultan of Kelantan: Sultan Yahya Petra
  - Menteri Besar of Kelantan: Ishak Lotfi Omar
- Perlis
  - Raja of Perlis: Tuanku Syed Sirajuddin (Regent)
  - Menteri Besar of Perlis: Sheikh Ahmad Mohd Hashim
- Perak
  - Sultan of Perak:
    - Sultan Yusuf Izzuddin Shah (until 4 January)
    - Sultan Idris Al-Mutawakil Alallahi Shah (from 5 January)
  - Menteri Besar of Perak: Shaari Shafie
- Pahang
  - Sultan of Pahang: Sultan Abu Bakar Ri'ayatuddin Al-Mu'azzam Shah
  - Menteri Besar of Pahang: Wan Abdul Aziz Ungku Abdullah
- Selangor
  - Sultan of Selangor: Sultan Salahuddin Abdul Aziz Shah
  - Menteri Besar of Selangor: Abu Bakar Baginda
- Terengganu
  - Sultan of Terengganu: Sultan Ismail Nasiruddin Shah
  - Menteri Besar of Terengganu: Ibrahim Fikri Mohammad
- Negeri Sembilan
  - Yang di-Pertuan Besar of Negeri Sembilan: Tuanku Munawir
  - Menteri Besar of Negeri Sembilan: Mohammad Said Muhammad
- Penang
  - Governor of Penang: Raja Uda Raja Muhammad
  - Chief Minister of Penang: Wong Pow Nee
- Malacca
  - Governor of Malacca: Tun Abdul Malek bin Yusuf
  - Chief Minister of Malacca: Abdul Ghafar Baba
- Sarawak
  - Governor of Sarawak: Tun Abang Haji Openg bin Abang Saipee
  - Chief Minister of Sarawak: Stephen Kalong Ningkan
- Sabah
  - Governor of Sabah: Tun Datu Mustapha Datu Harun
  - Chief Minister of Sabah: Fuad Stephens
- Singapore
  - Yang di-Pertuan Negara of Singapore: Yusof Ishak
  - Prime Minister of Singapore: Lee Kuan Yew

(Source: Malaysian Department of Informations)

== Events ==
- 21 March – Freedom from Hunger campaign was commemorated on a Malayan stamp.
- May – A&W's first store in Asia Pacific and Malaysia opened at Kuala Lumpur's Batu Road.
- June – Shah Alam was established as a planned city.
- 26 June – The Cameron Highlands Hydroelectric Scheme was established.
- 27 July – The Indonesia–Malaysia confrontation began. War broke out.
- 11 March – The National Language Act 1963 was gazetted.
- 31 August – The Muzium Negara (National Museum) officially opened.
- 16 September – The Federation of Malaysia was formed through the merging of the Federation of Malaya and the British crown colonies of North Borneo, Sarawak and Singapore.
  - 7:30am – Proclamation of Malaysia ceremonies were held in Kuala Lumpur (Peninsular Malaysia), Kota Kinabalu (Sabah) Kuching (Sarawak) and Singapore.
- 3 October – The 4th World Orchids Conference was held in Singapore.
- 26 October – Sultan Idris Al-Mutawakil Alallahi Shah was installed as the 33rd Sultan of Perak.
- 4 November – The 9th Commonwealth Parliamentary Conference was held in Kuala Lumpur.
- 14 November – The National Zoo of Malaysia (Zoo Negara) was officially opened.
- 21 November – The Malaysian Houses of Parliament officially opened.
- 22 November - Malayan Film Unit (MFU) renamed as Filem Negara Malaysia (FNM).
- 28 December – The launch of Television Malaysia by Tunku Abdul Rahman Putra Al-Haj.

== Births ==
- 9 February – Eric Moo – Singer-songwriter, actor and record producer.
- 1 June
  - Mohd Misbahul Munir Masduki – Politician.
  - Ahmad Johnie Zawawi – Politician.
- 2 June – Teng Chang Khim – Politician.
- 7 July – Jamal Jamaluddin – Sinar FM radio announcer.
- 21 December – Chua Tian Chang – Politician.
- 31 December – Azalina Othman Said – Politician.

== Deaths ==
- 4 January – Sultan Yusuf Izzuddin Shah of Perak, 32nd Sultan of Perak (b. 1890).
- 12 January – Tun Leong Yew Koh, 1st Governor of Malacca and former Minister of Justice (b. 1888).
- 11 February – Lim Lean Teng, businessman and founder of Han Chiang High School (b. 1870).
- 9 March – Ong Keng Seng, Chinese community leader, businessman and philanthropist (b. 1898).
- 17 April – Nik Mohamed Adeeb Nik Mohamed, Member of the Dewan Negara (b. 1917).
- 9 May – Charles Vyner Brooke, last White Rajah of Sarawak (b. 1874).
- 6 November – Dato' Suleiman Abdul Rahman, Ex-Minister of the Interior and former Malaysian High Commissioner to Australia (b. 1912).

== See also ==
- 1963
- 1962 in Malaya | 1964 in Malaysia
- History of Malaysia
