= 1967 in Malaysia =

- Decades: 1960s; 1970s; 1980s
- See also: Other events of 1967; History of Malaysia • Timeline • Years

This article lists important figures and events in Malaysian public affairs during the year 1967, together with births and deaths of notable Malaysians.

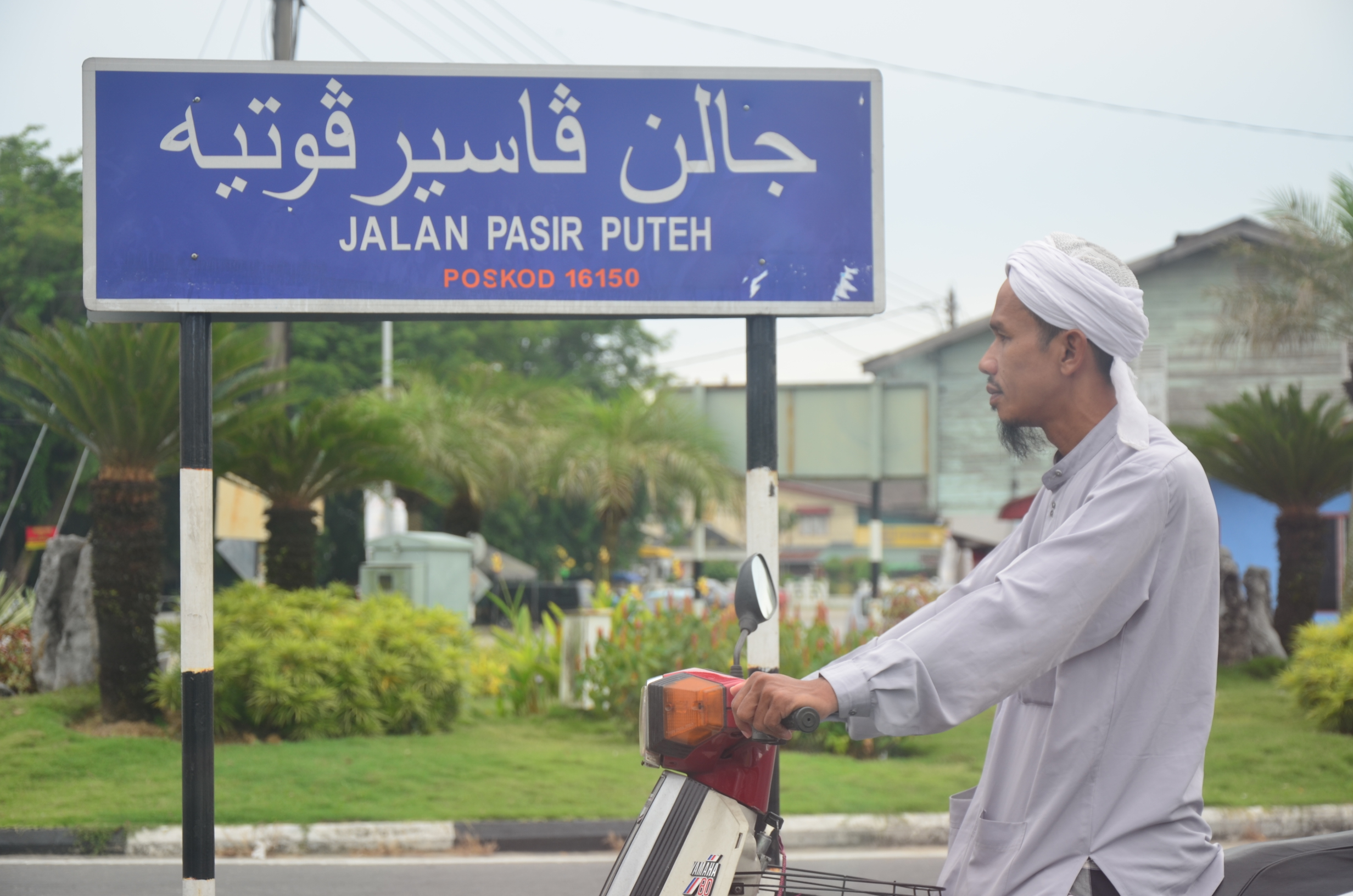
Bahasa Melayu became Malaysia's national language on 1 September 1967

== Incumbent political figures ==
=== Federal level ===
- Yang di-Pertuan Agong: Sultan Ismail Nasiruddin Shah of Terengganu
- Raja Permaisuri Agong: Tengku Ampuan Intan Zaharah of Terengganu
- Prime Minister: Tunku Abdul Rahman Putra Al-Haj
- Deputy Prime Minister: Datuk Abdul Razak
- Lord President: Syed Sheh Hassan Barakbah

=== State level ===
- Sultan of Johor: Sultan Ismail
- Sultan of Kedah: Sultan Abdul Halim Muadzam Shah (Deputy Yang di-Pertuan Agong)
- Sultan of Kelantan: Sultan Yahya Petra
- Raja of Perlis: Tuanku Syed Putra
- Sultan of Perak: Sultan Idris Shah
- Sultan of Pahang: Sultan Abu Bakar
- Sultan of Selangor: Sultan Salahuddin Abdul Aziz Shah
- Sultan of Terengganu: Tengku Mahmud (Regent)
- Yang di-Pertuan Besar of Negeri Sembilan:
  - Tuanku Munawir
  - Tuanku Jaafar
- Yang di-Pertua Negeri (Governor) of Penang:
  - Raja Tun Uda (until May)
  - Tun Syed Sheikh Barabakh (from May)
- Yang di-Pertua Negeri (Governor) of Malacca: Tun Haji Abdul Malek bin Yusuf
- Yang di-Pertua Negeri (Governor) of Sarawak: Tun Abang Haji Openg
- Yang di-Pertua Negeri (Governor) of Sabah: Tun Pengiran Ahmad Raffae

== Events ==
- 8 February – Tunku Abdul Rahman celebrated his 64th birthday.
- February – The Institut Teknologi MARA (ITM) was established, replacing RIDA Training Centre
- March – Batu Tiga Circuit (Shah Alam), the first Malaysian race track circuit, was officially opened.
- 30 March – Malaysia-Hong Kong Link of SEACOM Telephone Cable was officially opened.
- 2 May – US-made Sikorsky S-61 military transport helicopter renamed Nuri was used by the Royal Malaysian Air Force for the first time.
- 10 June – Malaysia won the third Thomas Cup.
- 12 June – The Malaysian ringgit (Malaysian dollar) was officially introduced, replacing the Malaya and British Borneo dollar.
- 1 July – Full immigration control at Malaysia-Singapore border imposed.
- 8 August – Malaysia a full member at the formation of ASEAN.
- 31 August – The 10th anniversary of Malaysia's independence was celebrated.
- 1 September – Bahasa Malaysia (Malay Language) became the National Language of Malaysia. The National Language Act 1967 was gazetted.
- 8 September – Centenary of Sarawak Council celebrated.
- 2 December – Malaysian Stamp Centenary celebrated.

== Births ==
- 1 March – Rosyam Nor – Malay actor
- Unknown date – Sazali Abdul Samad – Malaysian bodybuilder

== Deaths ==
- 14 April – Tuanku Munawir ibni Almarhum Tuanku Abdul Rahman, 9th Yang di-Pertuan Besar of Negeri Sembilan (b. 1922).
- 2 June – Lee Kong Chian, businessman, philanthropist and Chinese community leader (b. 1893).
- 3 July – Abdul Samad Gul Ahmad Mianji, PAS Member of Parliament for Pasir Mas Hulu (b. 1935).
- 21 July – Hussein Hassan, UMNO Member of Parliament for Raub (b. 1917).
- 2 September – Ahmad Abdullah, PAS Member of Parliament for Kelantan Hilir (b. 1926).
- 7 December – Syed Omar Shahabuddin, 3rd Menteri Besar of Kedah (b. 1902).

== See also ==
- 1967
- 1966 in Malaysia | 1968 in Malaysia
- History of Malaysia
