= 1966 in Malaysia =

- Decades: 1960s; 1970s; 1980s
- See also: Other events of 1966; History of Malaysia • Timeline • Years

This article lists important figures and events in Malaysian public affairs during the year 1966, together with births and deaths of significant Malaysians.

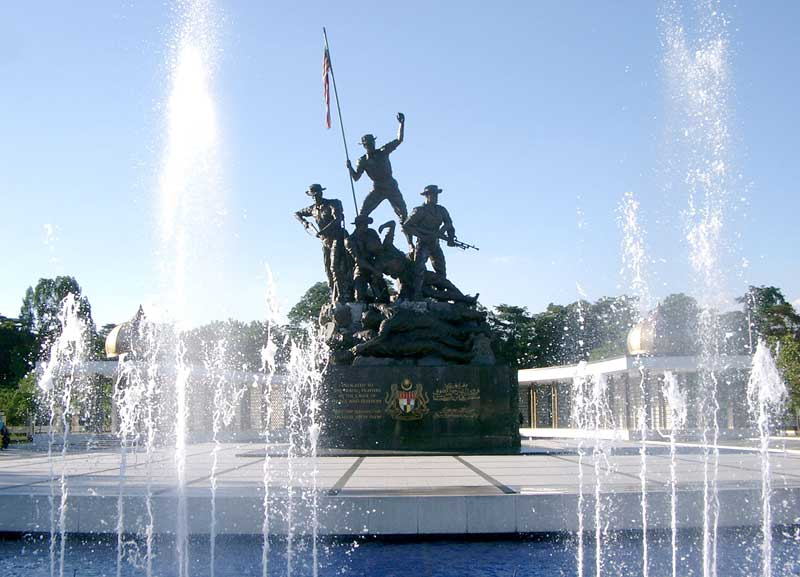
Tugu Negara, the Malaysian National Monument

== Incumbent political figures ==
=== Federal level ===
- Yang di-Pertuan Agong: Sultan Ismail Nasiruddin Shah of Terengganu
- Raja Permaisuri Agong: Tengku Intan Zaharah of Terengganu
- Prime Minister: Tunku Abdul Rahman Putra Al-Haj
- Deputy Prime Minister: Datuk Abdul Razak
- Lord President: James Beveridge Thomson then Syed Sheh Hassan Barakbah

=== State level ===
- Sultan of Johor: Sultan Ismail
- Sultan of Kedah: Sultan Abdul Halim Muadzam Shah (Deputy Yang di-Pertuan Agong)
- Sultan of Kelantan: Sultan Yahya Petra
- Raja of Perlis: Tuanku Syed Putra
- Sultan of Perak: Sultan Idris Shah
- Sultan of Pahang: Sultan Abu Bakar
- Sultan of Selangor: Sultan Salahuddin Abdul Aziz Shah
- Sultan of Terengganu: Tengku Mahmud (Regent)
- Yang di-Pertuan Besar of Negeri Sembilan: Tuanku Munawir
- Yang di-Pertua Negeri (Governor) of Penang: Raja Tun Uda
- Yang di-Pertua Negeri (Governor) of Malacca: Tun Haji Abdul Malek bin Yusuf
- Yang di-Pertua Negeri (Governor) of Sarawak: Tun Abang Haji Openg
- Yang di-Pertua Negeri (Governor) of Sabah: Tun Pengiran Ahmad Raffae

== Events ==
- 8 February – The National Monument or Tugu Negara in Kuala Lumpur was officially opened.
- 11 April – Sultan Ismail Nasiruddin Shah of Terengganu was installed as the fourth Yang di-Pertuan Agong.
- 28 May – The Malaysian and Indonesian governments declared that the confrontation was over. The peace treaty was signed in Bangkok, Thailand.
- 8 July – The Anugerah Sukan Negara or National Sports Awards were introduced. Mani Jegathesan and Mary Rajamani won the first awards.
- 15 September – The governor of Sarawak declared a state of emergency in Sarawak during the 1966 Sarawak constitutional crisis.
- 21 October – The 150th anniversary of Penang Free School was celebrated.
- 30-31 October – US President Lyndon Baines Johnson visited Malaysia, being the first American president to do so. On 31 October, President Johnson visited Kampung Labu Jaya village (now FELDA LB Johnson) in Negeri Sembilan state.
- 1 December – First Malaysia Plan was implemented.

== Births ==
- 30 April – Ahmad Maslan – Malaysian politician
- 7 October – James Ratib – Politician
- 19 November – Nazir Razak – renowned banker, former CIMB Bank Chairman (2014–2020)
- 22 December – Din Beramboi (real name Mior Ahmad Fuad Mior Badri) – actor, comedian and Era FM DJ (died 2010

== Deaths ==
- 17 April – Yeoh Tat Beng, MCA Member of Parliament for Beruas (b. 1914).
- 2 June – Richard O. Winstedt, British orientalist and colonial administrator (b. 1878).
- 15 November – Rolland Braddell, British colonial adviser and historian (b. 1880).

== See also ==
- 1965 in Malaysia | 1967 in Malaysia
- History of Malaysia
