= 1946 in Malaya =

- Decades: 1930s; 1940s; 1950s; 1960s
- See also: Other events of 1946; History of Malaysia • Timeline • Years

This article lists important figures and events in the public affairs of British Malaya during the year 1946, together with births and deaths of prominent Malayans. Malaya remained under British Military Administration until the establishment of the Malayan Union on 1 April.

== Incumbent political figures ==
=== Central level ===
- Governor of Malaya :
  - Military Administration - (until 30 March)
  - Edward Gent - (from 1 April)

=== State level ===
- Perlis :
  - Raja of Perlis : Syed Harun Putra Jamalullail
- Johore :
  - Sultan of Johor : Sultan Ibrahim Al-Masyhur
- Kedah :
  - Sultan of Kedah : Sultan Badlishah
- Kelantan :
  - Sultan of Kelantan : Sultan Ibrahim
- (Terengganu) Trengganu :
  - Sultan of Trengganu : Sultan Ismail Nasiruddin Shah
- Selangor :
  - Sultan of Selangor : Sultan Sir Hishamuddin Alam Shah Al-Haj
- Penang :
  - Monarchs : King George VI
  - Residents-Commissioner :
    - Thomas John Norman Hilken (until unknown date)
    - Sydney Noel King (from unknown date)
- Malacca :
  - Monarchs : King George VI
  - Residents-Commissioner : Edward Victor Grace Day
- (Negeri Sembilan) Negri Sembilan :
  - Yang di-Pertuan Besar of Negri Sembilan : Tuanku Abdul Rahman ibni Almarhum Tuanku Muhammad
- Pahang :
  - Sultan of Pahang : Sultan Abu Bakar
- Perak :
  - British Adviser of Perak : Arthur Vincent Aston (from unknown date)
  - Sultan of Perak : Sultan Abdul Aziz Al-Mutasim Billah Shah

== Events ==
- 16 January – A Chinese vegetable gardener named Foong Mok killed nine people in Boyan, a kampong near Taiping, Perak. He was subsequently sent to hospital for observation and found to be insane.
- 1 April – The Malayan Union was established, combining the Straits Settlements (except Singapore), Federated Malay States and Unfederated Malay States into a single entity, and replaced British Military Administration (BMA).
- 1 April
  - Civil Affairs Police Force (CAPF) was renamed the Malayan Union Police Force.
  - Malayan Film Unit (MFU) was established.
  - Radio Televisyen Malaysia (RTM) was established.
- 11 May – United Malays National Organisation (UMNO) was founded at Istana Besar, Johor Bahru, Johor. Dato Onn Jaafar became the first president.
- August – Malayan Indian Congress (MIC) was founded by John A. Thivy.
- 1 September – Malayan Meteorological Service was established (changing its name to Malaysian Meteorological Service in 1965).
- 14 December – All-Malaya Council of Joint Action (AMCJA) was founded (dissolved in 1948).
- Unknown date – The Alice Smith School was founded. One of the oldest British international schools in Asia.
- Unknown date – The Kelantan Football Association was founded as Kelantan Amateur Football Association.

== Births ==
- 10 April – Ng Yen Yen, former Minister of Tourism
- 24 April – Hasan Malek, politician
- 26 May – Abdul Rahman Sulaiman, politician and journalist (d. 2022)
- 29 July – Rashid Din, former PKR MP for Merbok
- 2 August – Abdullah Md Zin, former UMNO MP for Besut
- 3 August – Ibrahim Saad, politician and diplomat (d. 2024)
- 24 August – Md Isa Sabu, 8th Menteri Besar of Perlis
- 27 August – Fauzi Abdul Rahman, politician
- 28 September – Fong Kui Lun, former DAP MP for Klang and Bukit Bintang
- 29 September – Shafie Salleh, 6th Chief Scout of Malaysia (d. 2019)
- 6 November – Tojol Rosli Mohd Ghazali, 9th Menteri Besar of Perak
- 14 November – Abdul Ghani Othman, 14th Menteri Besar of Johor
- 10 December – Lee Lam Thye, politician and social activist
- 14 December – Khalid Ibrahim, 14th Menteri Besar of Selangor (d. 2022)

== Deaths ==
- 5 January – Dato Mustapha Jaafar, 4th Menteri Besar of Johor (b. 1862)
- 23 February – Tomoyuki Yamashita, general of the Imperial Japanese Army, also known as "The Tiger of Malaya" (b. 1885)
- 26 April – Ernst Charteris Holford Wolff, 11th British Resident of Negeri Sembilan (b. 1875)
- 11 June – Frank Swettenham, British colonial administrator and 1st Resident General of the Federated Malay States (b. 1850)
- 12 June – Hisaichi Terauchi, Field marshal of the Imperial Japanese Army (b. 1879)
- 6 September – Cai Baiyun, 8th Secretary-General of the Malayan Communist Party (b. 1913)
- 12 September – Edward Shaw Hose, 10th British Resident of Negeri Sembilan (b. 1871)
