= 1945 in Malaya =

- Decades: 1930s; 1940s; 1950s; 1960s
- See also: Other events of 1945; History of Malaysia • Timeline • Years

This article lists important figures and events in the public affairs of British Malaya during the year 1945, together with births and deaths of prominent Malayans. Malaya remained under Japanese occupation until September, when British Military Administration was installed.

== Events ==
Below, the events of World War II have the "WW2" acronym.

- 15–16 May – WW2: Battle of the Malacca Strait
- 6 & 9 August – WW2: Atomic bombings of Hiroshima and Nagasaki. These forced Emperor of Japan Hirohito to announce the surrender of Japan on 15 August, ending World War 2 in the Asian theatre.
- 28 August–2 September – WW2: Operation Zipper
- September – Civil Affairs Police Force (CAPF) was established.
- 4 September – WW2: Japanese forces in Malaya surrendered to the Allies at Penang, signing Penang surrender document on HMS Nelson.
- 12 September – British Military Administration(BMA) was installed in Kuala Lumpur.
- 17 October – Parti Kebangsaan Melayu Malaya was established.
- Late 1945 – Angkatan Wanita Sedar (AWAS) was established. Aishah Ghani was the first president.

== Births ==
- 2 March – Kanang anak Langkau – Warrior (died 2013)
- 26 February – Julie Sudiro – Singer
- 7 April – M. Rajoli – Actor (died 2010)
- 16 May - Mahadzir Bin Mohd Khir – Politician (died 2012)
- 29 July – Muhammad Haji Muhd Taib – Politician
- Unknown date – Yusni Jaafar – Actor (died 2007)
