= 1943 in Malaya =

- Decades: 1930s; 1940s; 1950s; 1960s
- See also: Other events of 1943; History of Malaysia • Timeline • Years

This article lists important figures and events in the public affairs of British Malaya during the year 1943, together with births and deaths of prominent Malayans. Japanese forces continued to occupy Malaya.

== Events ==
Below, the events of World War II have the "WW2" acronym.

- July – WW2: Japanese Prime Minister Hideki Tojo announced that Kedah, Perlis, Kelantan and Terengganu were to be returned to Thailand and become Syburi, Palit, Kalantan, Trangkanu provinces.
- 18 October – WW2: Thailand began administering the states as Syburi (ไทรบุรี), Palit (ปะลิส), Kalantan (กลันตัน) and Trangkanu (ตรังกานู) provinces.
- 13 November – WW2: Action of 13 November 1943

== Births ==
- 9 February – Muhammad Uthman El-Muhammady – Muslim cleric
- 17 May – Syed Sirajuddin Syed Putra Jamalulail – 12th Yang di-Pertuan Agong
- 10 July – Sanusi Junid – Politician
- 29 July – Hj Jamaluddin bin Shahadan – Former Silat teacher
- 16 October – Omar b. Mohamed Dan – Former Director of Malaysian Prison Department
- 22 October – Chua Jui Meng – Politician and former Ministry of Health (1995-2004)
- 17 November – Roseyatimah – Actress (died 1987)
- Unknown date – Mat Jahya Hussin – Muslim cleric
- Unknown date – Rahmah Rahmat – Actor (died 1993)
- Unknown date – S. Rosley – Actor (died 2017)

== Deaths ==
- 13 May – Sultan Abdul Hamid Halim Shah, 26th Sultan of Kedah (1881-1943)
- 5 December – Abdul Rahim Kajai – Father of Journalist Malaya
