= 1969 in Malaysia =

- Decades: 1960s; 1970s; 1980s
- See also: Other events of 1969; History of Malaysia • Timeline • Years

This article lists important figures and events in Malaysian public affairs during the year 1969, together with births and deaths of notable Malaysians. Race riots following the general election of 10 May led to the dissolution of parliament and an interim legislative council being put in place.

== Incumbent political figures ==
=== Federal level ===
- Yang di-Pertuan Agong: Sultan Ismail Nasiruddin Shah of Terengganu
- Raja Permaisuri Agong: Tuanku Ampuan Intan Zaharah of Terengganu
- Prime Minister: Tunku Abdul Rahman Putra Al-Haj
- Deputy Prime Minister: Datuk Abdul Razak
- Lord President: Azmi Mohamed

=== State level ===
- Sultan of Johor: Sultan Ismail
- Sultan of Kedah: Sultan Abdul Halim Muadzam Shah (Deputy Yang di-Pertuan Agong)
- Sultan of Kelantan: Sultan Yahya Petra
- Raja of Perlis: Tuanku Syed Putra
- Sultan of Perak: Sultan Idris Shah II
- Sultan of Pahang: Sultan Abu Bakar
- Sultan of Selangor: Sultan Salahuddin Abdul Aziz Shah
- Sultan of Terengganu: Tengku Mahmud (Regent)
- Yang di-Pertuan Besar of Negeri Sembilan: Tuanku Jaafar
- Yang di-Pertua Negeri (Governor) of Penang: Tun Syed Sheikh Barabakh
- Yang di-Pertua Negeri (Governor) of Malacca: Tun Haji Abdul Malek bin Yusuf
- Yang di-Pertua Negeri (Governor) of Sarawak:
  - Tun Abang Haji Openg (until February)
  - Tun Tuanku Bujang Tuanku Othman (from February)
- Yang di-Pertua Negeri (Governor) of Sabah: Tun Pengiran Ahmad Raffae

== Events ==
- 8 February – Solidarity Week was commemorated on a Malaysian stamp.
- 10 May – The 1969 Malaysian General Elections
- 13 May – Race riots in Kuala Lumpur and several parts of Klang Valley. 196 people were killed between 13 May and 31 July.
- 16 May – May 13th Incident:
  - The Yang di-Pertuan Agong, Sultan Ismail Nasiruddin Shah declared a state of emergency and dissolved parliament.
- 17 May – May 13th Incident:
  - The National Operations Council (NOC) (Majlis Gerakan Negara (MAGERAN)) was established to act as a temporary legislative council.
- 18 May – May 13th Incident:
  - The Refugee Centres for race riot victims were set up in Kuala Lumpur at Merdeka Stadium, TPCA Stadium, Chinwoo Stadium and Jalan Shaw School.
- 24 July – Communist terrorist killed Chinese woman leaving her house in the small isolated mining village of Sintok, Kedah.
- 11 October – Radio Malaysia and Television Malaysia merged into a single broadcasting service Radio Television Malaysia.
- 25 October – Communist terrorist mined a stretch of the Changlun-Sadao road on the Malaysia-Thailand border and tried unsuccessfully to ambush a Malaysian security forces motorised convoy.
- 17 November – RTM2 was launched from Angkasapuri, Kuala lumpur.
- 8 December – National Rice Year was commemorated on a Malaysian stamp.
- 10 December – Communist terrorists launched their first sabotage operation when they blew up the railway bridge at Kok Mak near the Malaysian border town of Padang Besar in Perlis.
- 26 December – Pahang warrior, Mat Kilau came out into the open, accompanied by his son, Omar Mat Kilau, and announced his true identity at the Pulau Tawar Mosque near Jerantut.

== Births ==
- 1 January – Ng Tian Hann, movie director
- 12 May – Saiful Apek, comedian
- 6 October – Sultan Muhammad V, 15th Yang di-Pertuan Agong of Malaysia

== Deaths ==
- 31 January – Syed Sheh Shahabudin, 2nd Yang di-Pertua Negeri of Penang (b. 1912)
- 15 March – D. R. Seenivasagam, prominent leader of the People's Progressive Party (b. 1925)
- 25 March
  - Yang Chu Chung, Commander-in-chief of the Sarawak People's Guerilla Force (b. 1935)
  - Yap Choon Hau, Political Commissar of the Sarawak People's Guerilla Force (b. 1935)
- 28 March – Abang Openg, 1st Yang di-Pertua Negeri of Sarawak (b. 1905)
- 25 October – Burhanuddin al-Helmy, 3rd President of the Malaysian Islamic Party (b. 1911)
- 24 November – Tunku Ismail Tunku Yahya, 2nd Menteri Besar of Kedah (b. 1907)

== See also ==
- 1969
- 1968 in Malaysia | 1970 in Malaysia
- History of Malaysia
