= 1970 in Malaysia =

- Decades: 1960s; 1970s; 1980s; 1990s
- See also: Other events of 1970; History of Malaysia • Timeline • Years

This article lists important figures and events in Malaysian public affairs during the year 1970, together with births and deaths of notable Malaysians.

== Incumbent political figures ==
=== Federal level ===
- Yang di-Pertuan Agong:
  - Sultan Ismail Nasiruddin Shah of Terengganu (until 21 September)
  - Sultan Abdul Halim Muadzam Shah of Kedah (from 21 September)
- Raja Permaisuri Agong:
  - Tengku Intan Zaharah of Terengganu (until 21 September)
  - Sultanah Bahiyah of Kedah (from 21 September)
- Prime Minister:
  - Tunku Abdul Rahman Putra Al-Haj (until 22 September)
  - Tun Abdul Razak (from 22 September)
- Deputy Prime Minister: Tun Dr Ismail (from 22 September)
- Lord President: Azmi Mohamed

=== State level ===
- Sultan of Johor: Sultan Ismail
- Sultan of Kedah: Tengku Abdul Malik (Regent from 21 September)
- Sultan of Kelantan: Sultan Yahya Petra
- Raja of Perlis: Tuanku Syed Putra
- Sultan of Perak: Sultan Idris Shah II
- Sultan of Pahang: Sultan Abu Bakar
- Sultan of Selangor: Sultan Salahuddin Abdul Aziz Shah
- Sultan of Terengganu: Tengku Mahmud (Regent until 21 September)
- Yang di-Pertuan Besar of Negeri Sembilan: Tuanku Jaafar
- Yang di-Pertua Negeri (Governor) of Penang: Tun Syed Sheikh Barabakh
- Yang di-Pertua Negeri (Governor) of Malacca: Tun Haji Abdul Malek bin Yusuf
- Yang di-Pertua Negeri (Governor) of Sarawak: Tun Tuanku Bujang Tuanku Othman
- Yang di-Pertua Negeri (Governor) of Sabah: Tun Pengiran Ahmad Raffae

== Events ==
- 1 January – New uniforms for police personnel and school pupils are introduced.
- 21 January – The National Consultative Council (NCC) established.
- 4 April – Malaysia's first satellite station was commissioned in Kuantan, Pahang.
- 6 August – Pahang state government declared and officially verified that the said Mat Siam was truly the legendary Pahang warrior, Mat Kilau, the son of Tok Gajah. However, on 10 August, he died due to old age.
- 31 August – Rukun Negara, the national ideology, was declared.
- 31 August – The first theme for National Day was Muhibah dan Perpaduan ("Goodwill and Unity").
- 31 August – Malaysia's national butterflies were recognized on a Malaysian stamp series.
- 7 September – The 50th anniversary of International Labour Organization was celebrated.
- 21 September – Tuanku Abdul Halim Muadzam Shah of Kedah was elected as the fifth Yang di-Pertuan Agong.
- 22 September – Tunku Abdul Rahman Putra Al-Haj resigned as prime minister.
- 22 September – Tun Abdul Razak became the new prime minister of Malaysia.
- 26 September – Tun Dr Ismail was appointed Deputy Prime Minister of Malaysia.
- 24 October – The 25th anniversary of United Nations was celebrated.
- 20 December – Fire broke out at Royal Selangor Club.

== Births ==
- 19 May – Kenny Chua Teck Ho – politician
- 16 June – Rusdi Ramli – Malaysian actor and director
- 30 August – Michael Wong – Malaysian Chinese singer
- 4 November – Angie Cheong – Malaysian actress and former Miss Chinese Malaysia
- 5 December – Fauziah Latiff – Malaysian singer and actress

== Deaths ==
- 3 January – Mustarjo, film actor (b. 1890).
- 1 March – Hamzah Alang, UMNO Member of Parliament for Kampar (b. 1922).
- 24 May – Abdul Rahman Mohamed Yassin, 1st President of the Dewan Negara (b. 1891).
- 25 May – Mat Amin, cadre member of the 10th MNLA Regiment (b. 1927).
- 3 June – Wu Tien Wang, prominent member of the Malayan Communist Party (b. 1919).
- 16 August – Mat Kilau, famous Pahang Malay who resisted British colonial rule during the Pahang Uprising (b. 1865).

== See also ==
- 1970
- 1969 in Malaysia | 1971 in Malaysia
- History of Malaysia
