= 1941 in British Malaya =

- Decades: 1930s; 1940s; 1950s; 1960s
- See also: Other events of 1941; History of Malaysia • Timeline • Years

This article lists important figures and events in the public affairs of British Malaya during the year 1941, together with births and deaths of prominent Malayans. The Japanese occupation of Malaya started in December 1941.

== Incumbent political figures ==
=== Central level (until February 1942) ===
- Governor of Federated of Malay States:
  - Shenton Whitelegge Thomas
- Federal Secretaries of the Federated of Malay States:
  - Hugh Fraser
- Governor of Straits Settlements :
  - Shenton Whitelegge Thomas

=== State level (until February 1942) ===
- Perlis :
  - Raja of Perlis : Syed Alwi Syed Saffi Jamalullail
- Johore :
  - Sultan of Johor : Sultan Ibrahim Al-Masyhur
- Kedah :
  - Sultan of Kedah : Abdul Hamid Halim Shah
- Kelantan :
  - Sultan of Kelantan : Sultan Ismail Sultan Muhammad IV
- (Terengganu) Trengganu :
  - Sultan of Trengganu : Sulaiman Badrul Alam Shah
- Selangor :
  - British Residents of Selangor : G. M. Kidd
  - Sultan of Selangor : Sultan Sir Hishamuddin Alam Shah Al-Haj
- Penang :
  - Monarchs : King George VI
  - Residents-Councillors : Arthur Mitchell Goodman
- Malacca :
  - Monarchs : King George VI
  - Residents-Councillors :
- (Negeri Sembilan) Negri Sembilan :
  - British Residents of Negri Sembilan : John Vincent Cowgill
  - Yang di-Pertuan Besar of Negri Sembilan : Tuanku Abdul Rahman ibni Almarhum Tuanku Muhammad
- Pahang :
  - British Residents of Pahang : C. C. Brown
  - Sultan of Pahang : Sultan Abu Bakar
- Perak :
  - British Residents of Perak : Marcus Rex
  - Sultan of Perak : Sultan Abdul Aziz Al-Mutasim Billah Shah Ibni Almarhum Raja Muda Musa I

== Events ==
Below, the events of World War II have the "WW2" acronym

- 8 December – WW2: Imperial Japanese Army landings at Pak Amat Beach, Kota Bharu. This marked the official start of the Japanese occupation of Malaya.
- 8–11 December – WW2: Operation Krochol
- 9 December – WW2: Sungai Petani, Butterworth and Alor Star airport were captured by the Imperial Japanese Army.
- 10 December – WW2: The British battleship Prince of Wales and battlecruiser Repulse were sunk by Japanese aircraft after relying on false intelligence as to the location of the landings.
- 11–13 December – WW2: Battle of Jitra
- 14–16 December – WW2: Battle of Gurun
- 18 December – WW2: Malayan Peoples's Anti Japanese Army (MPAJA) founded.
- 30 December – WW2: Starting Battle of Kampar until 2 January 1942.
- Unknown date – Construction of India House (Penang) completed.

== Births ==
- 30 January – Ahmad Kamal Abdullah – Writer and National Sasterawan
- 20 February – Lim Kit Siang – Democratic Action Party (DAP) politician
- 1 March – Laila Taib – Wife to former Chief Minister of Sarawak, Abdul Taib Mahmud (died 2009)
- 22 June – Ariffin Mohamad @ Ayah Pin – Secterian leader (died 2016)
- 17 September – Syed Hussein Alatas – Writer
- 26 September – Raja Jaafar – Raja Muda Perak
- 7 October - Leo Moggie Anak Irok – Former Minister of Energy, Communication and Multimedia (1998-2004), Chairman Tenaga Nasional Berhad and Sabah Electricity Sdn Bhd
- 1 November – Ahmad Fairuz Abdul Halim – Former Attorney General of Malaysia (2003-2007)
- Unknown date – A. Galak – Actor
- Unknown date – Mohd. Yusof Noor – Politician

== Deaths ==
- 11 May – Eu Tong Sen, entrepreneur and philanthropist (b. 1877).
