= 1909 in British Malaya =

- Decades
- See also: Other events of 1909; History of Malaysia • Timeline • Years

This article lists important figures and events in the public affairs of British Malaya during the year 1909.

== Incumbent political figures ==
=== Central level ===
- High Commissioner to the Federated Malay States:
  - Sir John Anderson
- Governor of Straits Settlements:
  - Sir John Anderson

=== State level ===
==== Straits Settlements ====
- (Straits Settlements) Penang :
  - Residents-Councillor: William Peel
- (Straits Settlements) Malacca :
  - Residents-Councillor:

==== Federated Malay States ====
- (Federated Malay States) Selangor :
  - British Residents of Selangor: Henry Conway Belfield
  - Sultan of Selangor: Sultan Sir Alaeddin Sulaiman Shah
- (Federated Malay States) (Negeri Sembilan) Negri Sembilan:
  - British Residents of Negri Sembilan:Douglas Graham Campbell
  - Yang di-Pertuan Besar of Negri Sembilan: Tuanku Muhammad Shah
- (Federated Malay States) Pahang :
  - British Residents of Pahang:
    - Harvey Chevallier (acting, until unknown date)
    - Edward Lewis Brockman (from unknown date)
  - Sultan of Pahang: Sultan Ahmad Muazzam Shah
- (Federated Malay States) Perak :
  - British Residents of Perak: Ernest Woodford Birch
  - Sultan of Perak: Sultan Idris Murshidul Adzam Shah I

==== Other states ====
- Perlis :
  - Raja of Perlis: Syed Alwi Jamalullail
- (Johor) Johore :
  - Sultan of Johore: Sultan Ibrahim Al-Masyhur
- Kedah :
  - Sultan of Kedah: Sultan Abdul Hamid Halim Shah
- Kelantan :
  - Sultan of Kelantan: Sultan Muhammad IV
- Trengganu :
  - Sultan of Trengganu: Sultan Zainal Abidin III

== Events ==
- 10 March - The Anglo-Siamese Treaty is signed. Siam transfers suzerainty of the northern Malay states of Perlis, Kedah, Kelantan and Terengganu to the United Kingdom. Siam also cedes parts of Upper Perak (Gerik) region to the Federated Malay States.
- Unknown date – The Birch Memorial Clock Tower is unveiled to commemorate the first British Resident of Perak, James W. W. Birch.
