= 1968 in Malaysia =

- Decades: 1960s; 1970s; 1980s
- See also: Other events of 1968; History of Malaysia • Timeline • Years

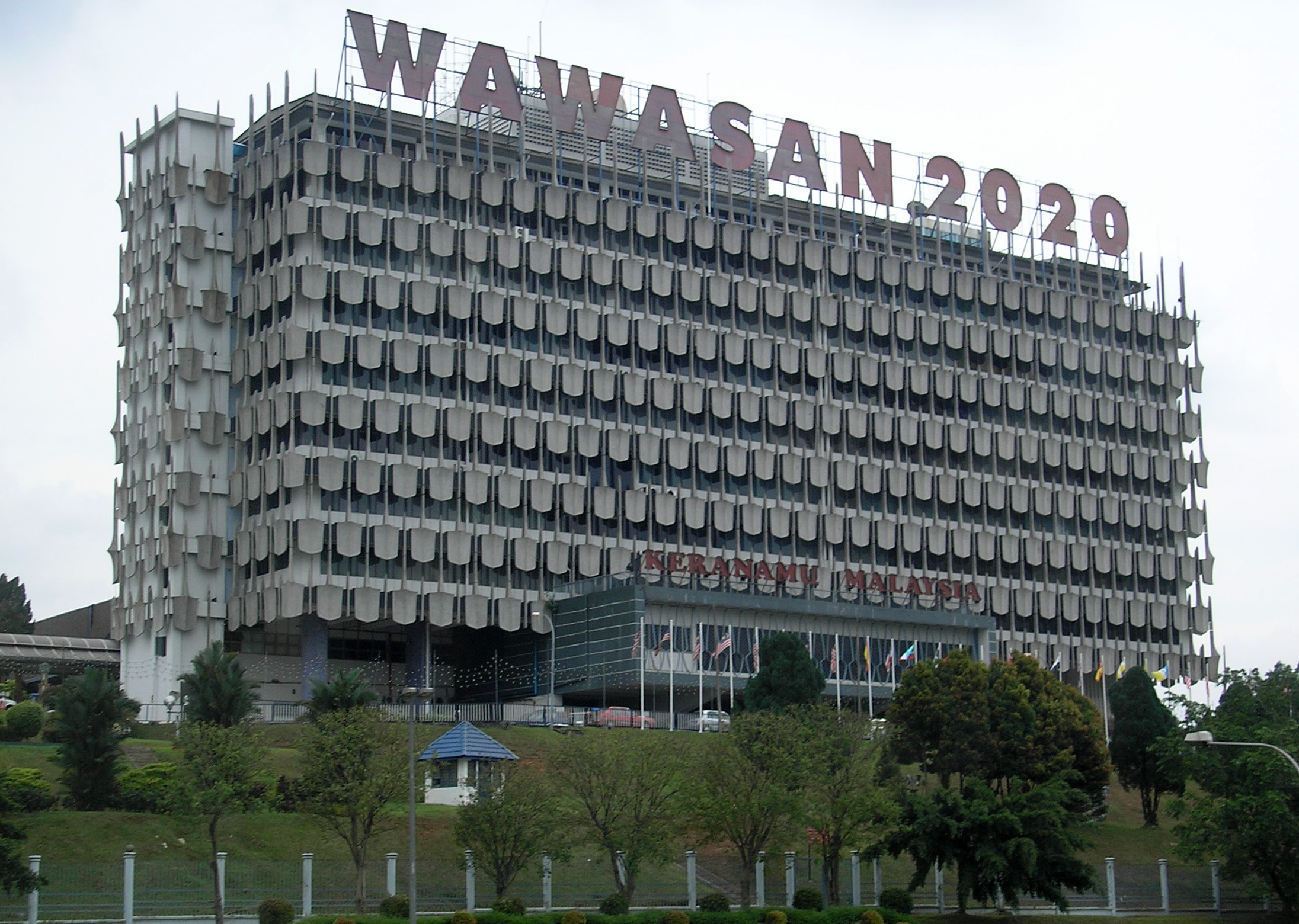
The Angkasapuri building in Kuala Lumpur.

This article lists important figures and events in Malaysian public affairs during the year 1968, together with births and deaths of notable Malaysians.

== Incumbent political figures ==
=== Federal level ===
- Yang di-Pertuan Agong: Sultan Ismail Nasiruddin Shah of Terengganu
- Raja Permaisuri Agong: Tuanku Ampuan Intan Zaharah of Terengganu
- Prime Minister: Tunku Abdul Rahman Putra Al-Haj
- Deputy Prime Minister: Tun Abdul Razak
- Lord President: Syed Sheh Hassan Barakbah then Azmi Mohamed

=== State level ===
- Sultan of Johor: Sultan Ismail
- Sultan of Kedah: Sultan Abdul Halim Muadzam Shah (Deputy Yang di-Pertuan Agong)
- Sultan of Kelantan: Sultan Yahya Petra
- Raja of Perlis: Tuanku Syed Putra
- Sultan of Perak: Sultan Idris Shah
- Sultan of Pahang: Sultan Abu Bakar
- Sultan of Selangor: Sultan Salahuddin Abdul Aziz Shah
- Sultan of Terengganu: Tengku Mahmud (Regent)
- Yang di-Pertuan Besar of Negeri Sembilan:Tuanku Jaafar
- Yang di-Pertua Negeri (Governor) of Penang: Tun Syed Sheikh Barabakh
- Yang di-Pertua Negeri (Governor) of Malacca: Tun Haji Abdul Malek bin Yusuf
- Yang di-Pertua Negeri (Governor) of Sarawak: Tun Abang Haji Openg
- Yang di-Pertua Negeri (Governor) of Sabah: Tun Pengiran Ahmad Raffae

== Events ==
- 17 January – The Radio Malaysia and Television Malaysia service were moved from Tunku Abdul Rahman multipurpose hall at Jalan Ampang to the new building at Angkasapuri.
- 8 April – Tuanku Jaafar was installed as the tenth Yang di-Pertuan Besar of Negeri Sembilan.
- 26 May – BERNAMA (Berita Nasional Malaysia) or Malaysian National News Agency established.
- 17 June – The Communist Party of Malaya launched an ambush of security forces in the area of Kroh–Betong road between Pengkalan Hulu town and the Malaysia-Thailand border, killing 17 members of the security forces. This event marked the start of the second armed revolt of the Communist Party of Malaya known as the Communist insurgency in Malaysia (1968–89).
- 16 July – Malaysia rejects the Philippines' claim to Sabah.
- 29 August – Natural Rubber Conference was held in Kuala Lumpur.
- 12–27 October – Malaysia competed at the 1968 Summer Olympics in Mexico City, Mexico. 31 competitors took part in four sports.

== Births ==
- 2 May – Ziana Zain - Malay singer and actress
- 24 November - Awie - Malaysia King of Rock, actor and host

== Deaths ==
- 12 July – Hassan Yunus, 10th Menteri Besar of Johor (b. 1907).
- 27 August – Abdullah Mohd Salleh, UMNO Member of Parliament for Segamat Utara (b. 1909).
- 18 October – Abdul Rahman Talib, 3rd Minister for Education (b. 1916).

== See also ==
- History of Malaysia
