= 1944 in Malaya =

- Decades: 1930s; 1940s; 1950s; 1960s
- See also: Other events of 1944; History of Malaysia • Timeline • Years

This article lists important figures and events in the public affairs of British Malaya during the year 1944, together with births and deaths of prominent Malayans. Japanese forces continued to occupy Malaya.

== Events ==
Below, the events of World War II have the "WW2" acronym.

- 11 January – WW2: Action of 11 January 1944
- 17 July – WW2: Action of 17 July 1944

== Births ==
- 15 January – Syed Hamid Albar – Politician
- 27 January – Adenan Satem – 5th Chief Minister of Sarawak (died 2017)
- 4 February – Punch Gunalan – Badminton player (died 2012)
- 20 February – Abdul Hamid Zainal Abidin – Politician
- 6 June – Abdul Rahim bin Mohd. Noor – 5th Inspector General of Police
- 27 July – Abdul Hamid Pawanteh – Politician
- 12 August – Rustam A. Sani – University Malaya lecturer (died 2008)
- 22 August – Syed Razak Bin Syed Zain Barakhbah – Politician and former Menteri Besar of Kedah (1999–2005)
- 7 December – Mustafa Ali – Politician
- Unknown date – Fazidah Joned – Singer (died 2001)
- Unknown date – Joseph Kurup – Politician
- Unknown date – Zami Ismail – Actor (died 2011)
