= 1947 Bangi stabbing =

Mass stabbing in Selangor, Malaysia

- Location: Bangi, Selangor, Malayan Union
- Date: 9 October 1947; 6:10 p.m.
- Weapon: Pocket knife
- Deaths: 11
- Injuries: 10
- Perpetrator: Mat Taram bin Sa'al
- Charges: Murder
- Verdict: Not criminally responsible

On 9 October 1947, a mass stabbing took place at Bangi Komuter station in Bangi, Selangor, British Malaya. Eleven people were killed and ten were injured on a FMSR train and outside the station before the perpetrator, 30-year-old Mat Taram bin Sa'al, was arrested in Sabak Bernam following a two-day manhunt. He was found not guilty for the insanity defense, and involuntarily committed to a mental hospital.

== Incident ==
On 9 October, Mat Taram and his family went to Labis by bus, where they boarded the mail train from Singapore to Kuala Lumpur. For most of the journey, Mat Taram remained quiet, but at about 6:10 p.m., when the train had just passed Bangi and was on its way to Kajang, he entered the restaurant car, drew a pocket knife with a four-inch blade and attacked four British Other Ranks of the Malaya Command Signals Regiment, who were having dinner at one of the tables. He killed sergeant Herbert Victor Marston by stabbing him in the heart, fatally stabbed J. Cormack in the abdomen, grievously injured Robert Ralston with a stab in the chest, and also stabbed a Malay named Mohamed Eusoff, as well as an Indian named Malimalai, who died from his chest wound on 12 October.

When the train was brought to an emergency halt, Mat Taram jumped off and disappeared into the jungle. Under a bridge near the railway tracks he stabbed a Chinese vagrant to death, and three miles further on entered a kongsi hut near Sungai Tangkas where he killed Cheow Hin, as well as two elderly women, and three children, and wounded nine other people, among them four children, before fleeing. Police arrived at the hut about one hour later, whereupon the wounded were brought to hospital. One of them, a woman, died from her wounds soon thereafter.

=== Manhunt ===
While hundreds of police officers were searching for him in the jungle around Bangi, Mat Taram went on a 90-mile march to his home in Parit Six, where he arrived 36 hours later. Upon being asked why he had returned, since it was thought that he was on his way to Sumatra, he told that he had no money for the trip and was on his way back home, but he had lost his wife and children when he was pushed out of the train after a fight that was incited by a Chinese boy who had spilt tea on him. Mat Taram was then brought to Sabak Bernam Police Station where he related his story, telling that he couldn't remember anything that happened after he was pushed off the train. One of the policemen, who had read the story about the mass murder in a newspaper, suspected that he could be the sought culprit, and so Mat Taram was arrested. Mat Taram was detained in Teluk Anson, where he was identified by his wife.

== Victims ==
- Cheow Hin, 40
- Chong Yit San, 7
- J. Cormack
- Liew Kew, 2
- Liew Ng Tai, 5
- Malimalai
- Herbert Victor Marston
- Three elderly women
- Chinese vagrant

Those wounded were: Robert Ralston, Mohamed Eusoff, Liew Ngan, 8, Liew Fah, 14, Liew See Tai, 13, Chong Kew, 13, Ng Lan, 50, Chong Shuen, Wong Yee and Chin Sam.

== Perpetrator ==
Mat Taram bin Sa'al, also known as Utoh, was a Banjarese padi planter from Tunggal Island near Sumatra. He owned a farm in Parit Six, Bagan Terap, near Teluk Anson, but when he wanted to return to his birthplace, he sold his house and land for 200 Straits dollar, and together with his wife and three children took the train to Singapore, to inquire the price for the journey. Upon finding that he could not afford the fee for the ferry, he became depressed, and, according to his wife, stayed awake for two days, but eventually he decided to return to Parit Six.

== Legal proceedings ==
Mat Taram was charged with the murder of Herbert Marston on 13 October. The case was then transferred to the court in Kajang, where hearings began on October 14. On 29 October, Mat Taram was sent to the mental hospital in Tanjong Rambutan to be observed there for a month. On 4 May 1948, he was found to have been of unsound mind while committing the murders and was sentenced to be confined at the mental hospital in Tanjong Rambutan at the pleasure of the Ruler-in-Council.
