= Minconsult =

Private limited engineering consultancy

Minconsult Sdn Bhd
- Type: Private Limited Company
- Industry: Infrastructure; Construction; Engineering; Energy; Water
- Founded: 1962
- Headquarters: Petaling Jaya, Selangor, Malaysia
- Area served: Malaysia
- Number of employees: 512 (2014)
- Website: Minconsult

Minconsult is a private limited engineering consultancy in Malaysia. Established in 1962, the company specializes in multi-disciplinary engineering and project management. Capable of providing a wide range of engineering consultancy services in the civil & structural, mechanical, electrical, petrochemical and environmental fields. Minconsult have since established foreign offices in Pakistan, Australia, Kazakshtan and Bangladesh.

Minconsult is known for their major involvement in the Malaysian energy industry; they have designed a good percentage of power plants constructed in Malaysia.

Dato' Ir. Dr. Dennis Ganendra was the first Chief Executive Officer of the company in its 60-year history, and is the Executive Director.

== Notable Projects ==
- Sultan Salahuddin Abdul Aziz Power Station

== Awards ==
- Industry Excellecnce Award 2009 for Export Excellence (Services) from Ministry of International Trade and Industry (MITI)
- Gold Award 2008 for Ir. P. Ganendra in recognition of his significant contributions to the engineering consultancy industry from Association of Consulting Engineers Malaysia (ACEM)
- Engineering Award 2008 for Silver Award of Merit for A-380 MAS Hangar at MAS Complex, Kuala Lumpur International Airport from Association of Consulting Engineers Malaysia (ACEM)
- Industry Excellence Award 2003 for Export Excellence (Services) from Ministry of International Trade and Industry (MITI)
- Engineering Award 1998 for Award of Special Merit for Lumut Combined Cycle Power Plant Project from Association of Consulting Engineers Malaysia (ACEM)
