= Lee Ee Hoe =

Malaysian tourism industry worker

Yang Berbahagia Dato' Sri Lee Ee Hoe SSAP DIMP JP PMC
- 李益輝
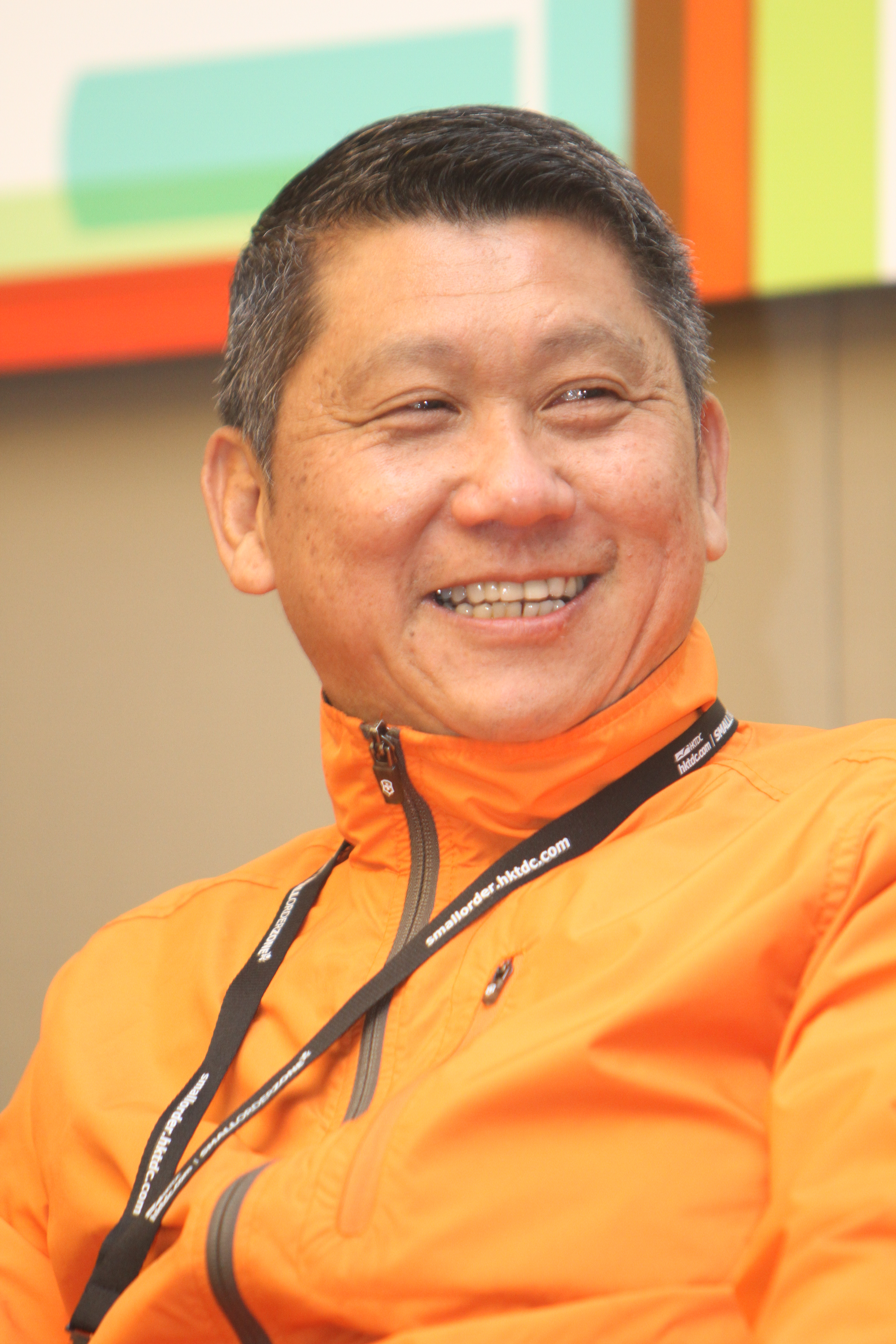
- Born: 5 July 1964 (age 62); Yong Peng, Johor, Malaysia
- Education: Tokyo International University
- Occupation: Group Executive Chairman
- Children: 2

Dato' Sri Lee Ee Hoe, JP (Chinese: 李益輝; pinyin: Lǐ Yìhuī; born 5 July 1964), also known as Leesan, is a Malaysian businessman in the tourism industry. He was the first recipient in the tourism industry to be bestowed the Order of the Rising Sun, Gold and Silver Rays by the Emperor of Japan in 2015. This is in recognition of his longstanding contributions in the development and promotion of tourism between Japan and Malaysia, as well as his bold move to lead the first tour to Japan soon after Japan's devastating tsunami and earthquake in 2011.

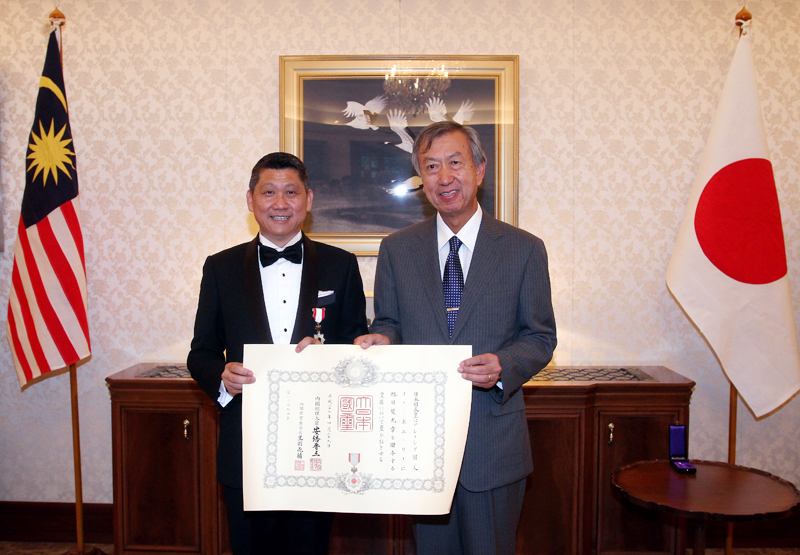
Conferment of the Order of the Rising Sun, Gold and Silver Rays

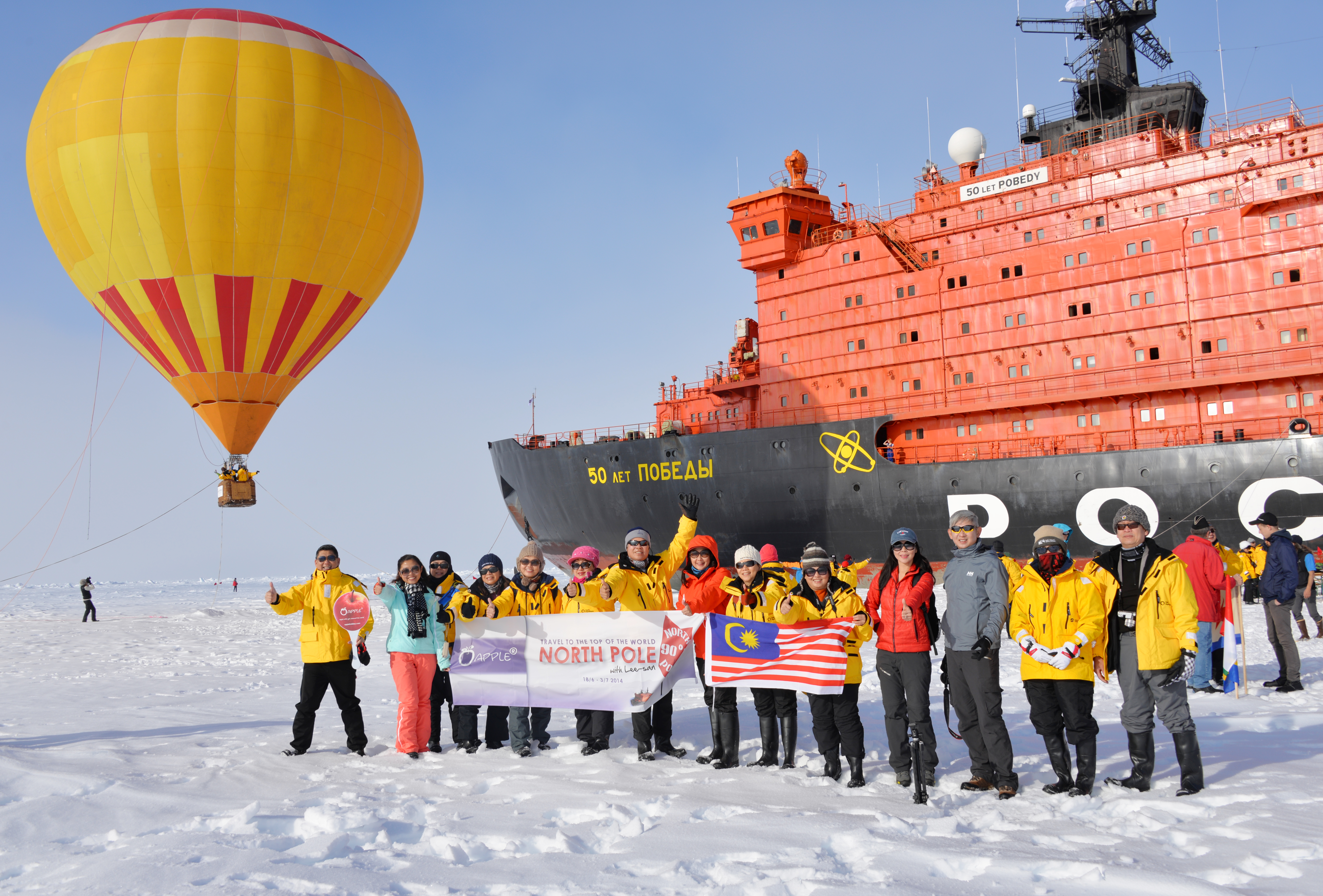
Travel Around the World with Lee San – North Pole 2014

On 28 Dec 2020, Leesan was awarded the Miri Mayor Special Award in recognition for his contributions and support towards Sarawak’s tourism during the Covid-19 pandemic.

As of 14 Aug 2026, Leesan has traveled to 168 countries and territories.

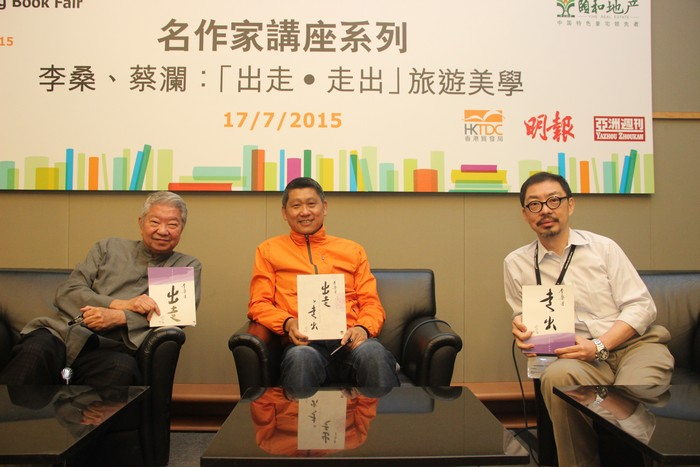
Book Launch – Hong Kong Book Fair 2015

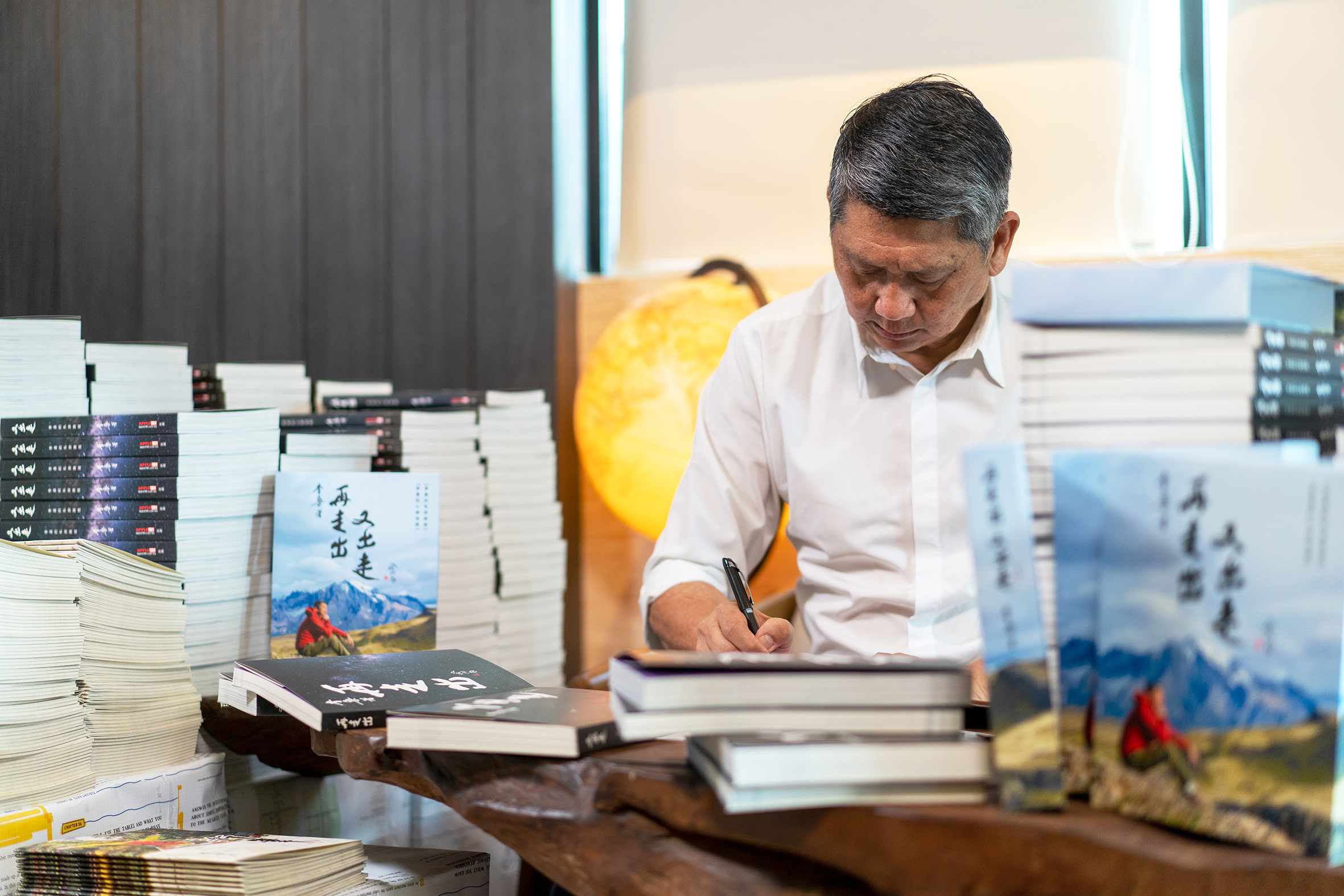
Book Launch – Malaysia 2021

== Early life and education ==
Leesan was born in Yong Peng, Johor. His interest in travel and sharing travel information started at a young age. In school, he and his friend and future business partner, planned scouting trips for their school troops. After secondary school, he became a licensed tourist guide in Malaysia. He continued his tertiary education in Japan and graduated with a Bachelor of Arts in Economics from Tokyo International University. After graduating, he returned to Malaysia with experience in the Japanese tour industry and set up a travel agency, Apple Vacations Sdn Bhd in 1996.

== Business career ==
Leesan is an entrepreneur and the Founder and Executive Chairman of KITA Tours & Travel, a luxury travel brand that offers customized journeys and curated boutique experiences.

He is also the founder of Apple Vacations Sdn Bhd (formerly Apple Vacations & Conventions Sdn Bhd), the first overseas travel agency to receive the prestigious Japan Tourism Agency Commissioner’s Commendation Award. Under his leadership, the company pioneered Malaysia Airlines’ first charter flight to Hokkaido in 2010. After decades at the helm,Leesan stepped down as Group Executive Chairman on 30 June 2025.

Beyond entrepreneurship, Leesan has played influential roles across tourism, culture, and media. He has served as Lifetime Overseas Advisor to the Taiwan Leisure Farm Development Association since 2009 and was Executive Director of main board–listed Yong Tai Berhad (7066) from April 2016 to May 2023. During his tenure, Yong Tai Berhad produced and staged Impression Melaka, a National Key Economic Area tourism project developed in collaboration with China Impression Wonders Art Development Co Ltd and endorsed by Malaysia’s Ministry of Tourism and Culture Minister Dato' Seri Nazri Aziz and the project launch in May in Beijing was witnessed by former Tourism Minister Tan Sri Datuk Seri Dr Ng Yen Yen.

A respected industry voice, Leesan is a columnist and the author of six travel books, including Isshokenmei: Story of a Globe-Trotter, his first English-language publication as of July 2024.

== International business ventures ==
In 2014, Apple Vacations Sdn Bhd started collaborating with Marriott International to develop the first Courtyard by Marriott in Malacca. It is planned to be in Malacca's central tourism district and to open in 2017.

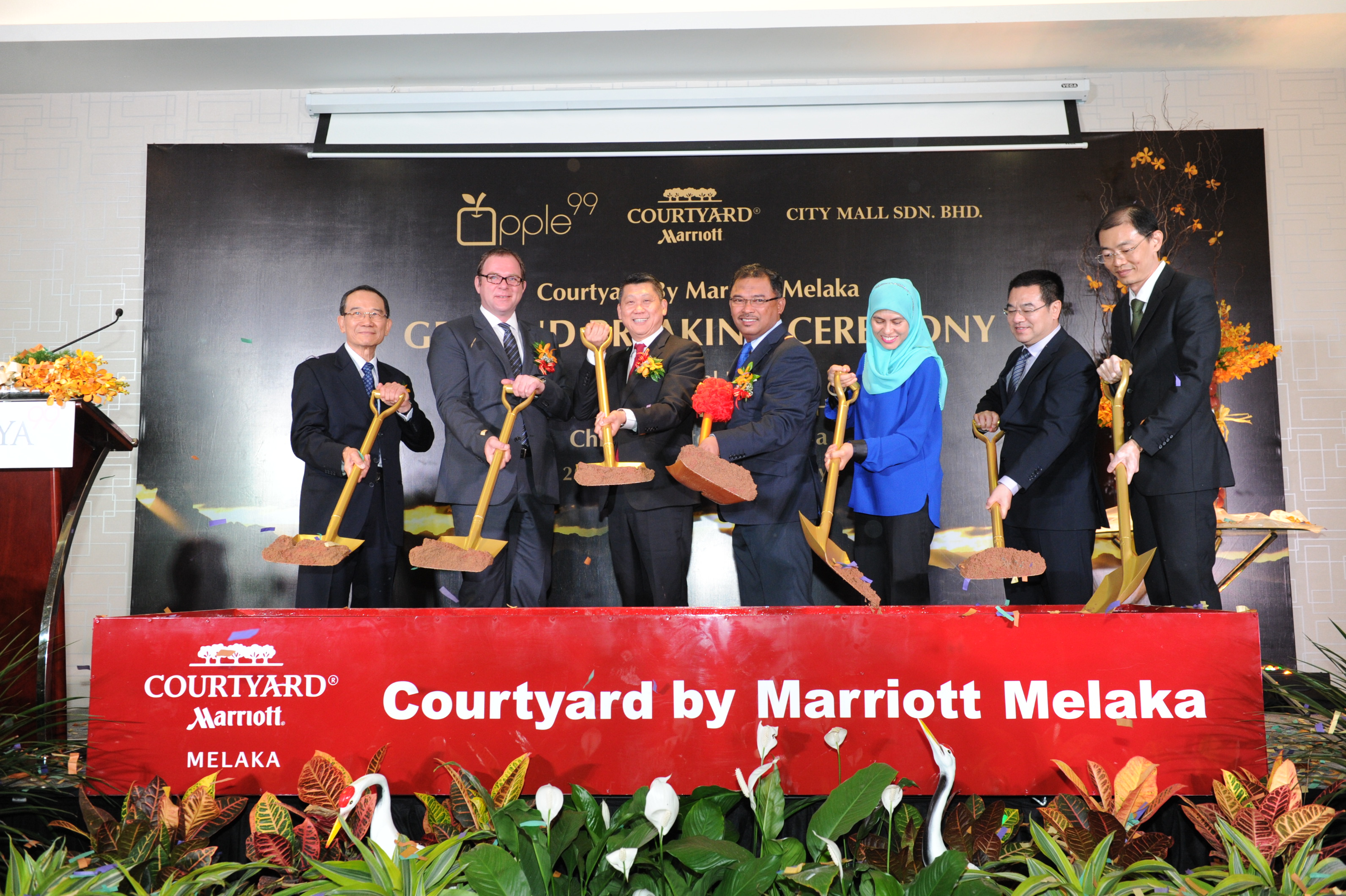
Courtyard by Marriott Melaka – Ground Breaking Ceremony

== Awards and recognition ==
=== Honours of Malaysia ===
- Sarawak :
  - Miri Mayor Special Award (2020)
- Negeri Sembilan :
  - Medal for Outstanding Public Service Bronze Medal (PMC) (2004)
  - Justice of the Peace (JP) (2008)
- Pahang :
  - Knight Companion of the Order of the Crown of Pahang (DIMP) - Dato' (2007)
  - Grand Knight of the Order of Sultan Ahmad Shah of Pahang (SSAP) - Dato' Sri (2013)
- Individual Award of "1st Malaysia Golden Entrepreneurs Award – Best Of The Best Leading Industry Award of 2013" (2014) by The Federation of Malaysia Chinese Guilds Association

=== Foreign honours ===
- Japan :
  - "Japan Tourism Agency Commissioner’s Commendation Award 2013" (2013) by Japan Tourism Agency
  - "Mie Prefecture Overseas Tourism Ambassador" (2014) by Government of Mie Prefecture Japan
  - 5th Class, Gold and Silver Rays of the Order of the Rising Sun (2015) by Emperor of Japan
