= SMK Aminuddin Baki, Johor Bahru =

SMK AMINUDDIN BAKI, JOHOR BAHRU
- Johor Bahru, Johor, Malaysia

Information
- Type: Public
- Motto: Belajar, Berilmu, Berbakti (To Learn, To Gain Knowledge, To Serve)
- Established: 1962
- School district: Johor Bahru
- Session: Morning Session
- Principal: Puan Hairunizar binti Mohsin (since 6 January 2026)
- Enrollment: Over 1000
- Classes: Form 1-5 UM, USM, UKM, UPM, UTM, UIA Form 6, PP, EKO, GEO, SV
- Yearbook: Sinar Magazine

Sekolah Menengah Kebangsaan Aminuddin Baki, Johor Bahru (SABJB), is a public national school in Johor Bahru, Johor, Malaysia. It is located on Jalan Abdul Samad. Schools surrounding SAB include S.M.K. Sultan Ismail (SSI), SMK Mohd Khalid Johor Bahru and S.J.K.(C) Foon Yew 2.

The school is named after Aminuddin Baki, who has been granted the soubriquet Bapa Pendidikan Malaysia (Father of Malaysian Education).

== History ==
1962

- The school was formed. Male students were put up at Maktab Sultan Abu Bakar, (MSAB), Johor Bahru, female students were put up at S.M. (P) Sultan Ibrahim,(SIGS), Johor Bahru.

1964

- The current school complex was built and ready to be used.

It was named Lower Secondary School.

1968

- Removed class students were accepted into the school. SABJB was inaugurated by the Minister of Education, YB Encik Mohd. Khir Johari.
- The fountain between the two main buildings was built with funds donated by the students.

1970

- Form 4 students were accepted into the school.

1971-1972

- Basketball team coach was Mr Ken Sundrom from USA. Team captains were Ng Kim Su and Yeo Hong Heng. Team players : Siow Kong Weng, Hanafi, Wahab, Tan Chee Seng, Thing Chee Meng, Tan Kim Wah, Seto, etc.

1972

- The late Mr. Goh Tieng Huat was the principal until 1972. He was replaced by Mr. Nordin bin Ahmad to replace his position as the principal until 1982.

1986

- SABJB celebrated its silver jubilee which was officiated by the Minister of Education, YB Datuk Abdullah Ahmad Badawi.

1987

- Mr. Ong Tiaw Ching, the acting principal took place as principal who will be replacing Mr. Haji Sahban until 1988 when Mr. Abdul Wahid took the place as an actual principal until 1990.

1988

- Two Form 6 classes (arts stream) were started.

2003

- The principal, Puan Hajah Satia Binti Kasim, was appointed as the district education officer (Pegawai Pendidikan Daerah), for Johor Bahru, the first woman to hold the position.

2006

- The "Sinar edisi ke-24 2006" magazine was published in SABJB.
- Mr. Zainal started serving as Advisor 2 based on the 2006 magazine.

2013

- To contribute Ms. Syam abscene either she was separated from SABJB to serve for the other schools or retire, Mr. Jasni replaced her from 8 July 2013.
- The "Sinar edisi ke-31 2013" magazine was published in SABJB.

2014

- As Mr. Zainal bin Buang replaced Mr. Jasni as principal, based on the 2014 magazine, he was called as The Former Principal.
- The "Sinar edisi ke-32 2014" magazine was published in SABJB.

2017

- The "Sinar edisi ke-35 2017" magazine was published in SABJB.
- Since Mr. Abdul Razak started serving as the principal, a lot of theories stating that Mr. Abdul Razak and Mr. Faruq, the Disciplinary teacher's faces were merely identical. But it isn't confirmed whenever they're the same or not. On top of that, based on the school teachers' album, it is revealed that Mr. Faruq's hair color was brown. He was younger back then expect for the fact that today, his hair color is black because he is getting old

2021

- UUM class (Tasawwur Islam, Business) was disbanded

2022

- UIA class (Tasawwur Islam, Business) was disbanded. 05 Batch is the last batch to have this package

Present (2023)

- SABJB offers place to Form 1 until Form 6 student. There are five streams that can be picked during Form 4 and 5 which is UM (Pure Science, Additional Mathematics), USM (Computer Science, Principles of Accounting), UKM (Home Science, Business), UPM (Home Science, Visual Arts) and UTM (Visual Arts, Business). Rather, for form 6, there are PP (Business Research), EKO (Economics), GEO (Geography) and SV (Visual Arts)

== List of Principals ==
- 1 January 1962 - 30 April 1973: Mr. Goh Tieng Huat (Mr. 吴丁发)
  - The very first principal in SMK Aminuddin Baki who's a Chinese descent
- 1 May 1973 - 30 June 1982: Mr. Nordin bin Ahmad
  - The first principal in SMK Aminuddin Baki who's actually a main, Malay descent
- 1 July 1982 - 30 June 1987: Mr. Haji Sahban bin Haji Muksan
- 1 July 1987 - 31 January 1988: Mr. Ong Tiaw Ching (Mr. 王刁晶)
  - The second Chinese-descent principal in SMK Aminuddin Baki who is known as the first principal to hold a position as an acting principal
- 1 February 1988 - 31 January 1990: Mr. Abdul Wahid bin Abdul Rahman
- 1 February 1990 - 30 September 1990: Sr. Haji Paiman bin Hussein
- 6 December 1990 – 31 July 1994: Mr. Ramli bin Haji Abdullah
- 1 August 1994 - 16 March 1997: Sr. Haji Rokhani bin Mangi
- 1 April 1997 - 31 March 1998: Mr. Zakaria Haji Abdul Shukor
- 1 April 1998 - 31 March 1999: Ms. Hajjah Zabedah binti Mohamed
  - The first woman to take the position as serve as a principal in SABJB
- 1 April 1999 - 16 April 2003: Mrs. Hajjah Satia binti Kasim
- 1 December 2003 - 2 May 2013: Mrs. Hajjah Syam binti Hairon
- 8 July 2013 - 1 July 2014: Mr. Haji Jasni bin Omar
- 16 September 2014 - 1 March 2015: Mr. Zainal bin Buang

- 27 April 2015 - 1 December 2016: Mrs. Hajjah Tarifa binti Sawir
- 16 January 2017 - 30 November 2018: Mr. Haji Abdul Razak bin Abdul Karim

- 23 December 2018 - 2 January 2022: Mr. Haji Mohd. Roslan bin Mustaffa
- 6 January 2022 - 22 December 2025: Mr. Mustaffa Kamal bin Idris, yang digelar sebagai "Ayahanda" oleh warga SMK AMINUDDIN BAKI (SABJB)
- 6 January 2026 - Now: Ms. Hairuniza Binti Mohsin

-Rajh Nair
