= Lam Eng Rubber =

Malaysian manufacturer of natural rubber

- Company type: Private Limited Company
- Industry: Rubber
- Founded: 1940
- Headquarters: Malaysia
- Products: Natural rubber latex, Skim Block, Standard Malaysian Rubber

Lam Eng Rubber Factory (M) Sdn. Bhd. is a Malaysian manufacturer of natural rubber.

The principal activities of the Company consist of processing and manufacturing of rubber and transportation services.

The Company's principal products, natural rubber latex, skim block and Standard Malaysian Rubber are manufactured at their main factory in Sungai Petani, Kedah.

Lam Eng is a member of the Malaysian Rubber Board (Lembaga Getah Malaysia) and the International Rubber Association.

The company supplies natural rubber latex to Coco Industry, Top Glove, Supermax (Malaysia), etc.
