= 1942 in Malaya =

- Decades: 1930s; 1940s; 1950s; 1960s
- See also: Other events of 1942; History of Malaysia • Timeline • Years

This article lists important figures and events in the public affairs of British Malaya during the year 1942, together with births and deaths of prominent Malayans. Malaya was occupied by Japanese forces at this time.

== Events ==
Below, the events of World War II have the "WW2" acronym

- 6–8 January – WW2: Battle of Slim River
- 11 January – WW2: Kuala Lumpur falls to the Imperial Japanese Army
- 14 January – WW2: Battle of Gemas
- 14–22 January – WW2: Battle of Muar
- 23 January – WW2: Parit Sulong Massacre
- 26–27 January – WW2: Battle off Endau
- 31 January – WW2: By this date, all of Malaya was under Japanese control.
- 12–15 February – WW2: Battle of Pasir Panjang
- 18 February-8 March – WW2: Sook Ching Massacre

== Births ==
- 24 February – Mohd Radzi Sheikh Ahmad – Politician
- 20 March – Abdullah Hassan – Linguist
- 26 March – Muhammad Haji Salleh – Writer and National Sasterawan
- 15 April – Rais Yatim – Politician
- 20 April – Khadijah Hashim – Writer and author
- 28 April - Sarimah Ahmad – Actress
- 5 May – Shamsuri Arshad – Former Deputy Inspector General of Police
- 25 July – Wan Zahidi bin Wan Teh – Federal Territory mufti
- 31 August – Mahyon Ismail – Actor (died 2011)
- Unknown date – Hassan bin Ahmad – Penang mufti
- Unknown date – S. Jibeng – Singer (died 2006)

== Deaths ==
- 14 February – Adnan Saidi, military officer in the Malay Regiment (b. 1915).
- 18 July – Lim Kang Sek, commander of the Dalforce (b. 1916).
- 31 July – Adam Lim, member of the Central Committee of the Malayan Communist Party (b. 1919).
- 9 August – Huang Cheng, Second highest ranking leader of the Malayan Communist Party (b. 1913).
- 1 September – Li Zhenzhong, Member of the Central Committee of the Malayan Communist Party (b. 1918).
- 25 September – Sulaiman Badrul Alam Shah of Terengganu, 14th Sultan of Terengganu (b. 1895).
