= Institut Pendidikan Guru Kampus Pendidikan Teknik =

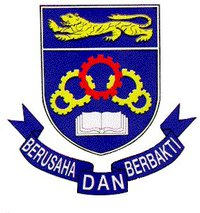
- Other name: IPG KPT
- Motto: Berusaha dan Berbakti (Malay)
- Motto in English: Try and serve
- Type: public
- Established: 17 May 1962
- Director: Dr Kartini binti Abdul Mutalib
- Administrative staff: 186 lecturers
- Location: Kompleks Pendidikan Nilai, Bandar Enstek, Negeri Sembilan. 2.7311°N 101.8014°E
- Website: http://ipgkpt.moe.edu.my/

Institut Pendidikan Guru Kampus Pendidikan Teknik is a teacher's education institute that prepares teacher to their jobs. It is one of the branch of Institut Pendidikan Guru under the Ministry of Education in Malaysia.
