= Sultan Salahuddin Abdul Aziz Power Station =

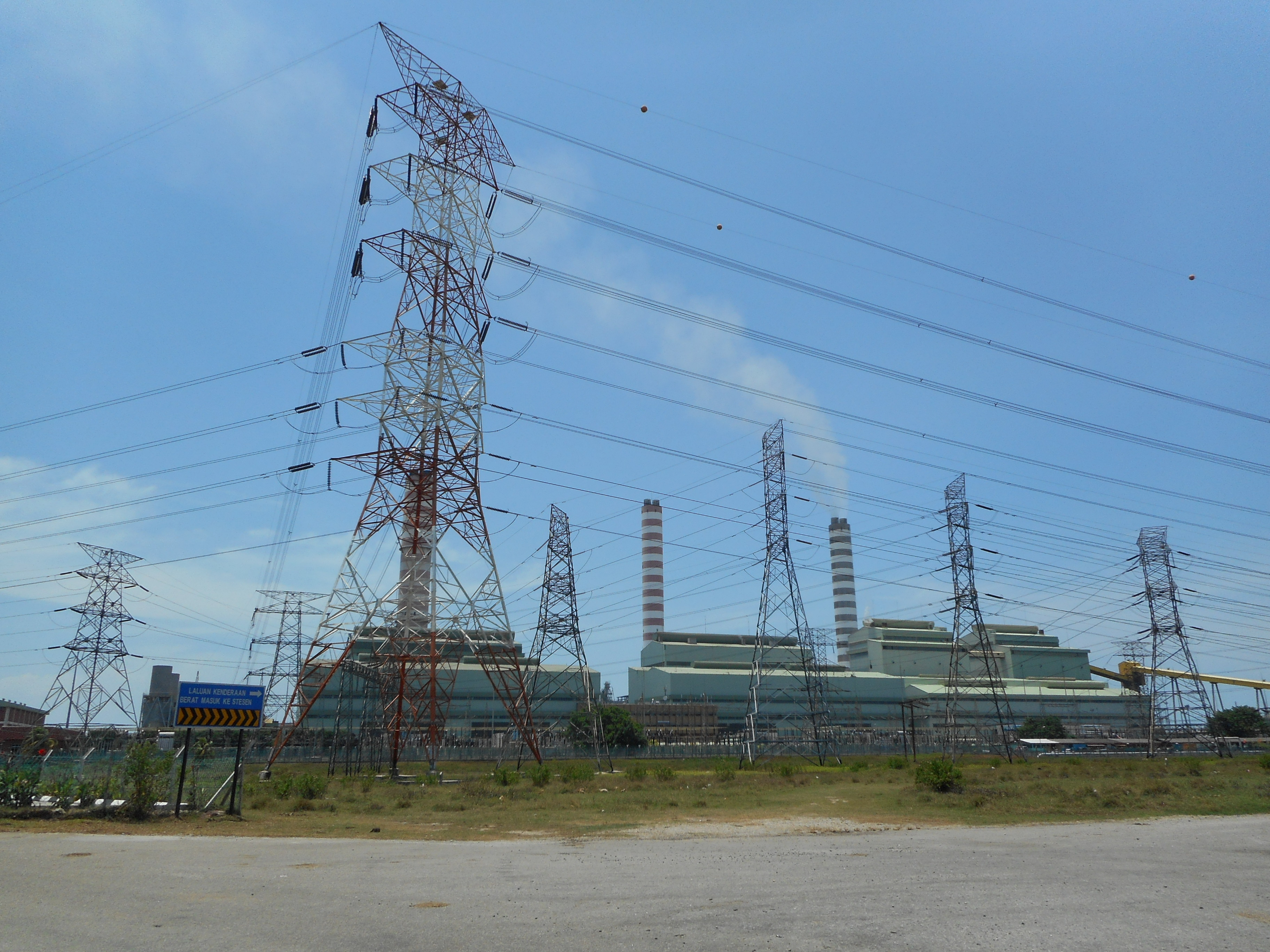
- Sultan Salahuddin Abdul Aziz Power Station
- Official name: Kapar Power Station
- Country: Malaysia
- Location: Kapar, Selangor
- Coordinates: 3.117°N 101.322°E
- Status: Operational
- Commission date: 1985
- Owners: Malakoff; Tenaga Nasional
- Operators: National Electricity Board (NEB) (Lembaga Letrik Negara (LLN)) (1985-1990); Tenaga Nasional Berhad (TNB) (1990-present)

Thermal power station
- Primary fuel: Coal
- Secondary fuel: Gas

Power generation
- Nameplate capacity: 2,200 MW

External links
- Website: kaparenergy.com.my
- Commons: Related media on Commons

Sultan Salahuddin Abdul Aziz Power Station (Malay: Stesen Janaelektrik Sultan Salahuddin Abdul Aziz) is a power station, which fires natural gas, bunker oil and coal, located in Kapar, Klang District, Selangor, Malaysia. It was opened in March 1987 by then Sultan of Selangor, Sultan Salahuddin Abdul Aziz Shah, and the station was named after him. In terms of power producing capacity, it remains the largest power station in Malaysia, despite the commissioning of several new power stations with 700MW steam turbines. It is also the first coal-fired power plant in the country.

Kapar Energy Ventures Sdn Bhd is a joint venture company between Tenaga Nasional Berhad (TNB) and Malakoff Berhad, with an equity holding of 60% TNB and 40% Malakoff Berhad. Kapar Energy Ventures Sdn Bhd (KEV) owns, operates and maintains SSAAPS since 9 July 2004, after successful acquisition of the power plant from TNB.

The plant was designed by Minconsult, a Malaysian engineering consultancy.

== Facilities ==
KEV SSAAPS has four generating facilities that can produce 2420 MW.

- GF1 consists of 2 units, a boiler and a steam turbine, with 300 MW each using natural gas and bunker oil.
- GF2 consists of 2 units, a boiler and a steam turbine with 300 MW each using natural gas, bunker oil and coal.
- GF3 consists of 2 units, a boiler and a steam turbine with 500 MW each using natural gas, bunker oil and coal.
- GF4 consists of 2 units, a gas turbine with 110 MW using natural gas and distillate fuel. GF4 has been decommissioned after its PPA ended in December 2019.

The power station ash pond is a sanctuary for migratory birds that stop over en route from Siberia to Australia.
