= Asmah Haji Omar =

Malaysian linguist

Dato' Asmah Haji Omar
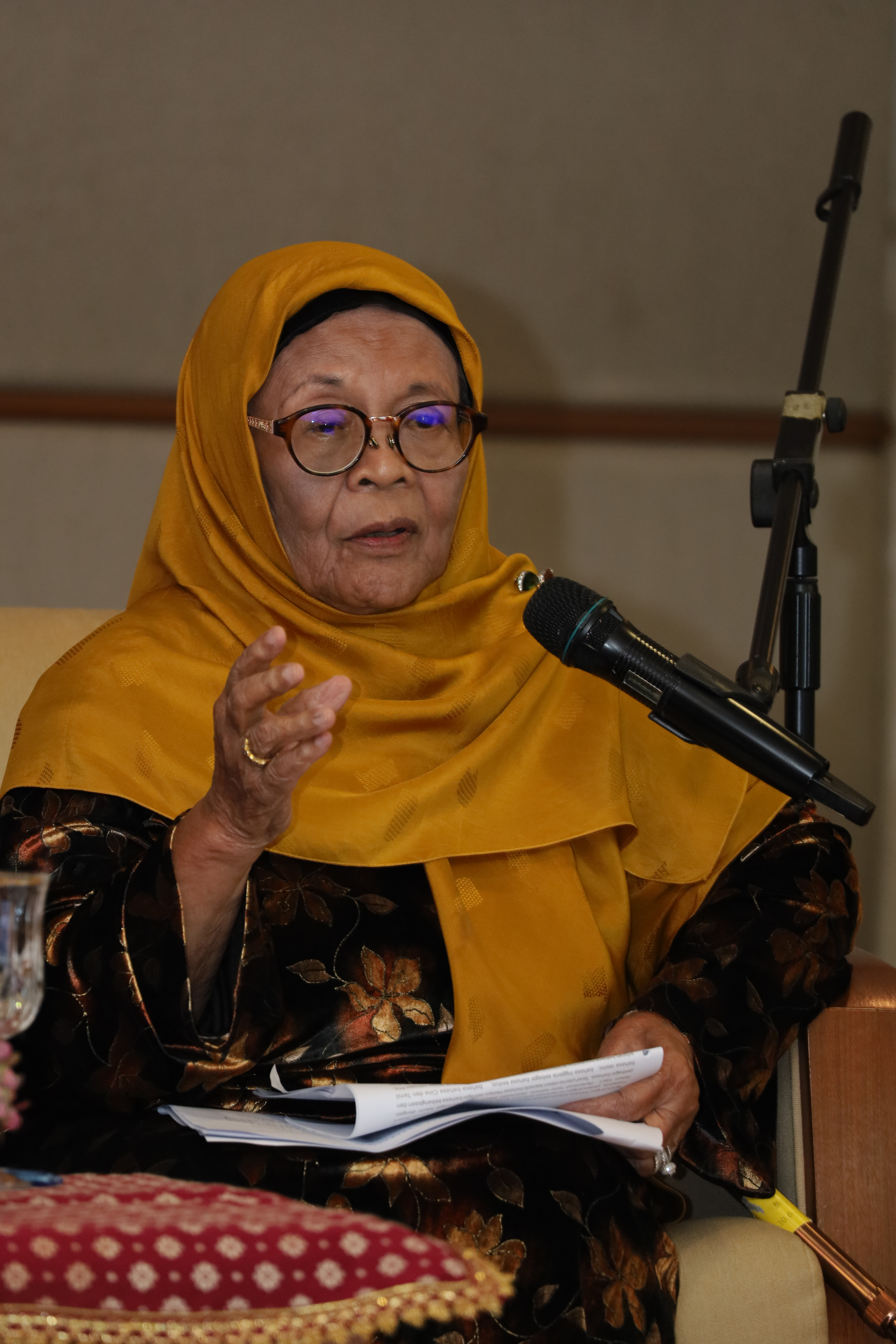
- Born: 5 March 1940 (age 86); Jitra, Kedah, Malaysia

Academic background
- Education: University of Indonesia; University of London (PhD)
- Thesis: The Iban Language of Sarawak: A Grammatical Description (1969)

Academic work
- Discipline: Linguist
- Sub-discipline: Languages of Malaysia
- Institutions: University of Malaysia

Asmah binti Omar (born 5 March 1940) is a Malaysian linguist. She is an emeritus professor at the Academy of Malay Studies, University of Malaya (UM). She was formerly Dean of the Faculty of Languages and Linguistics of the university. She was invited by Sultan Idris Education University (Tanjong Malim, Perak) to occupy the Za'ba Chair of Malay Civilization, and established the Institute of Malay Civilization (2001–2005) after retiring.
