= Edward Victor Grace Day =

New Zealand colonial administrator (1896-1968)

Edward Victor Grace Day CMG

British Adviser Perlis
- In office 1939–1941
- Preceded by: Christopher Dawson
- Succeeded by: Japanese governor

British Adviser Perlis
- In office 1946–1946
- Preceded by: Thai officer
- Succeeded by: Position abolished

Resident Commissioner, Malacca
- In office 1946–1947
- Preceded by: Japanese governor
- Succeeded by: John Falconer

Personal details
- Born: 28 April 1896
- Died: 23 June 1968 (aged 72)
- Occupation: Colonial administrator

Edward Victor Grace Day CMG (28 April 1896 – 23 June 1968) was a New Zealand colonial administrative service officer who served in British Malaya.

== Early life and education ==
Day was born on 28 April 1896 in New Zealand, and was the only son of Victor Grace Day, CBE, magistrate of Timaru. He was educated at Timaru Boys' High School and Christ's College, Christchurch, New Zealand. During the First World War he served as second lieutenant in the Rifle Brigade, was reported wounded in 1917, and from 1918–1921 was attached to the Gurkha Rifles.

== Career ==
In 1921, he joined the Malayan Colonial Service as a Cadet in the Straits Settlements. He served in various posts including Collector of Land Revenues and assistant District Judge, Malacca (1922); assistant British Adviser, Kedah (1925–26); District Officer, Raub (1926); assistant to Colonial Secretary, Straits Settlements (1932); Clerk of Councils, Straits Settlements (1932–1934); Municipal Commissioner, Registrar of Deeds and Assistant Treasurer, Malacca (1935); Resident Councillor, Malacca (1937); and British Adviser, Perlis (1939–1941).

During the Second World War, he was evacuated from Singapore on 13 February 1942 on HMS Grasshopper which was attacked and sunk by Japanese aircraft in the Bangka Strait while on its way to Sumatra. He later reached Ceylon and spent the remainder of the war in the Cocos Islands and India.

In 1945, he returned to Malaya with the rank of colonel on the British Army General List, and served as Adviser, Perlis and Resident Commissioner, Kedah (1946); President of Malacca Municipal Commission (1946); and Resident Commissioner, Malacca (1946–47). He played a leading role in the rehabilitation of Malaya after the Second World War, and personally guided and directed military and police operations in Kedah and Perlis. He served as British Adviser, Kedah, Federation of Malaya (1950–51). He retired from the Malay Civil Service in 1951, and went to Singapore and served in the Singapore government as Supervisor and Chairman of Rural Areas, and remained in the post from 1952–1954.

== Personal life and death ==
Day married Dorothy Norman in 1939 and they had two daughters. He died on 23 June 1968, aged 72.

== Honours ==
Day was appointed Companion of the Order of St Michael and St George (CMG) in the 1952 New Year Honours.
