= Munawir of Negeri Sembilan =

Yang di-Pertuan Besar of Negeri Sembilan from 1960 to 1967

Munawir مناور
- Yang di-Pertuan Besar of Negeri Sembilan
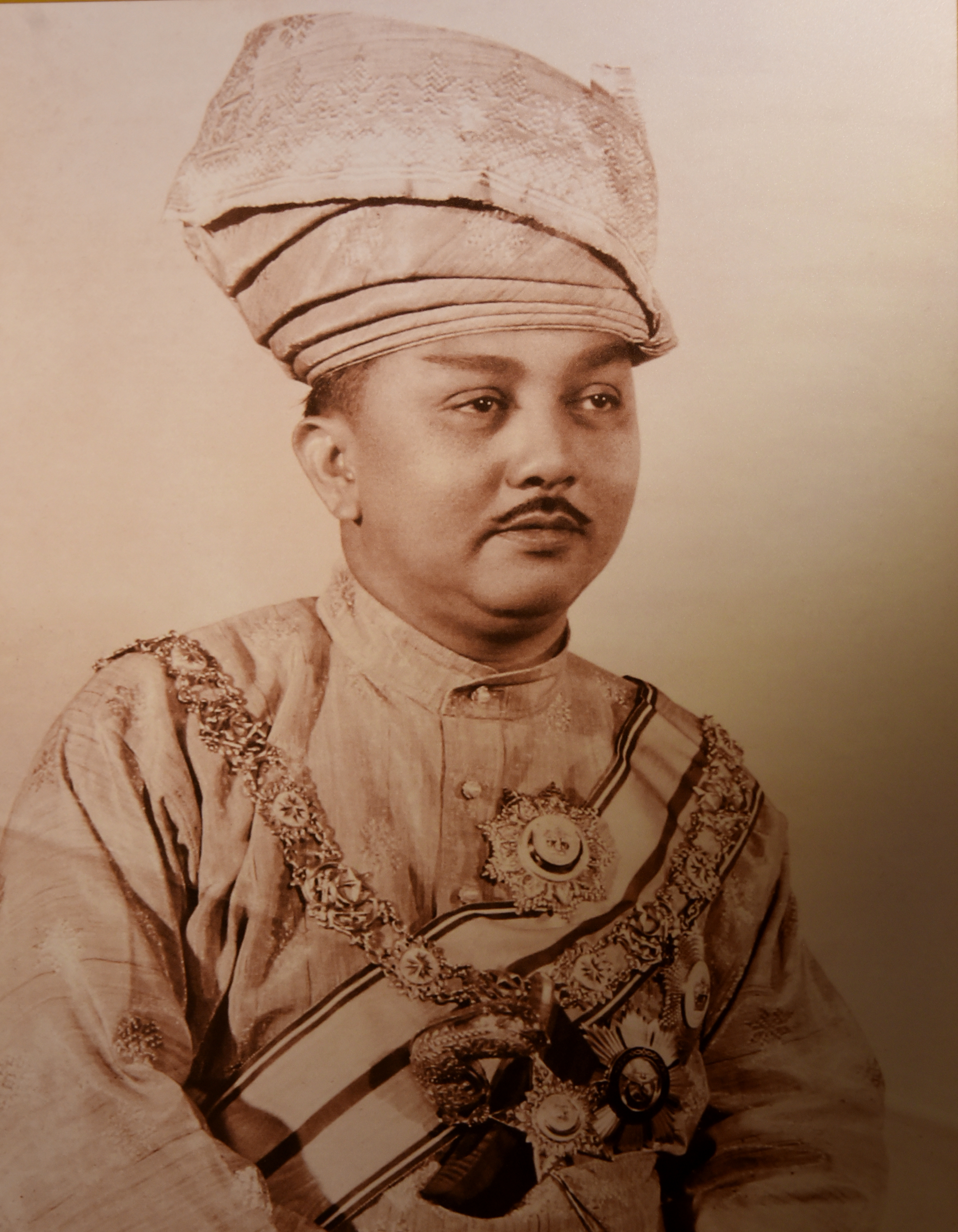
- Tuanku Munawir ibni Almarhum Tuanku Abdul Rahman

Yang di-Pertuan Besar of Negeri Sembilan
- Reign: 5 April 1960 - 14 April 1967
- Installation: 17 April 1961
- Predecessor: Tuanku Abdul Rahman
- Successor: Tuanku Ja'afar

Tunku Laksamana of Negeri Sembilan
- Tenure: April 1937 - April 1960
- Successor: Tunku Laksamana Nasir

Tunku Muda Serting of Negeri Sembilan
- Tenure: July 1934 - April 1960
- Predecessor: Tuanku Abdul Rahman
- Successor: Tuanku Ja'afar
- Born: 22 March 1922; Seri Menanti, Negeri Sembilan
- Died: 14 April 1967 (aged 45); Istana Hinggap, Seremban, Negeri Sembilan
- Burial: Seri Menanti Royal Mausoleum, Seri Menanti, Kuala Pilah
- Consort: Tunku Ampuan Durah binti Tunku Besar Burhanuddin
- Issue: Tunku Umpa Munawirah; Tunku Mudziah; Tunku Muhriz; Tunku Anne Dakhlah; Tunku Deborah; Tunku Deannah
Names
- Tunku Munawir ibni Tunku Abdul Rahman (at birth)
- Dynasty: Pagaruyung
- Father: Tuanku Abdul Rahman ibni Almarhum Tuanku Muhammad
- Mother: Tunku Maharunnisa binti Tunku Mambang
- Religion: Sunni Islam

Tuanku Munawir ibni Almarhum Tuanku Abdul Rahman (Jawi: توانكو مناور ابن المرحوم توانكو عبدالرحمن; 22 March 1922 – 14 April 1967) was the ninth Yang Di-Pertuan Besar (Grand Ruler) of the Malaysian State of Negeri Sembilan. He was the eldest son of the first Yang Di-Pertuan Agong (King of Malaysia), Tuanku Abdul Rahman with his second consort Tunku Maharun.

He ascended the throne as the Grand Ruler of Negeri Sembilan when his father died on 1 April 1960. His younger brother, Tuanku Ja'afar succeeded him after his death due to the relatively young age of his son. His son later became the eleventh Yamtuan Besar.

== Education ==
He received his early education at the Seri Menanti Malay School in 1928 before continuing his studies at the King George V School in Seremban and later on at the Malay College Kuala Kangsar. He then furthered his education abroad at the School Oriental Studies in the United Kingdom.

Upon his return to Malaya, Munawir served the public sector at the Seremban Land Office, Negeri Sembilan.

== Royal wedding ==
Munawir married Tunku Ampuan Durah in 1940 and had six children who are Tunku Munawirah, Tunku Mudziah, Tunku Muhriz, Tunku Anne Dakhlah, Tunku Deborah and Tunku Deannah.

== Yang di-Pertuan Besar (1960–1967) ==
The Undang Yang Empat were undisputed in selecting Munawir as his father's successor. On 5 April 1960, Tunku Munawir was installed as the ninth Yang di-Pertuan Besar of Negeri Sembilan.

== Death ==
He died from diabetes on 14 April 1967 after a seven-year reign as the ninth Yamtuan Besar. He was 45 years old and was buried at the Istana Hinggap, Seremban, Negeri Sembilan.

== Honours ==
=== Honours of Malaya ===
- Malaya
  - Grand Commander of Order of the Defender of the Realm (SMN) – Tun (1958)
  - Recipient of the Order of the Crown of the Realm (D.M.N.) (1961)
- Johor
  - First Class in gold of the Sultan Ismail of Johor Coronation Medal (10 February 1960)

=== Foreign Honours ===
- Brunei
  - Member of the Royal Family Order of the Crown of Brunei (DKMB) (24 September 1958)
- United Kingdom
  - Recipient of the Queen Elizabeth II Coronation Medal (2 June 1953)

Regnal titles
Preceded by Tuanku Abdul Rahman	Yang di-Pertuan Besar of Negri Sembilan; 1960–1967	Succeeded by Tuanku Ja'afar
