= List of Selangorean royal consorts =

List of queen consorts to the Sultan of Sultan

Consort of Sultan of Selangor
- State

Incumbent
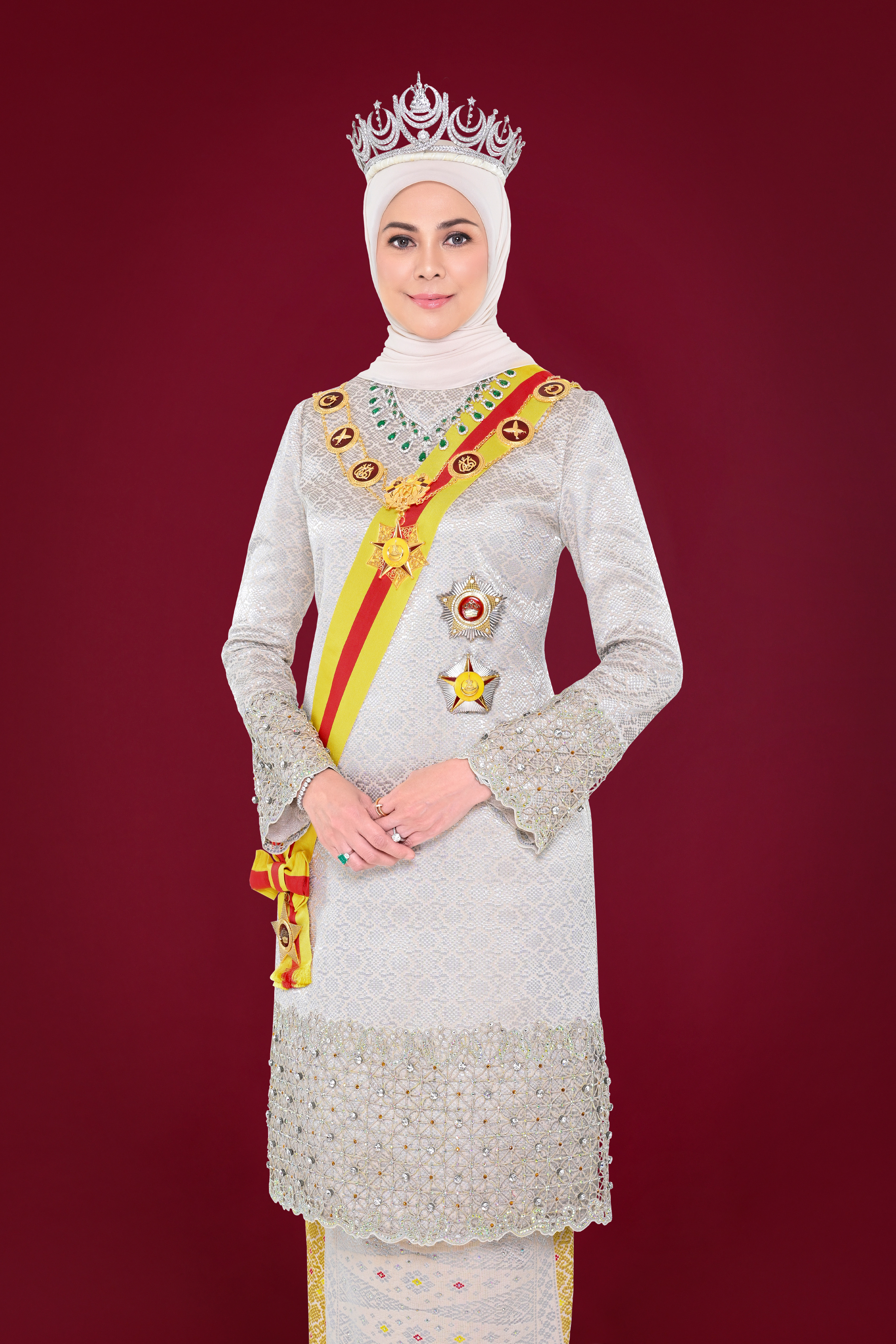
- Tengku Permaisuri Hajah Norashikin since 8 September 2016

Details
- Style: Her Royal Highness
- Formed: 1771; 255 years ago
- Residences: Alam Shah Palace, Klang
- Appointer: Sultan of Selangor

Throughout the history of Selangor Sultanate, several Sultans practiced polygamy, but per Islamic marital jurisprudence, they did not have more than four wives in the same time. However, this list only included those consorts given the official royal title.

For main consort of the Ruler of Selangor, she will be given the title of Tengku Ampuan of Selangor if they have royal blood meanwhile for consorts of non-royal blood, they will be titled as Tengku Permaisuri of Selangor. Both of these titles are styled Her Royal Highness (Malay: Duli Yang Maha Mulia).

The title of Che Puan Besar of Selangor is an official royal title given to the second wife of the Sultan at the time. She will be styled as Her Highness (Malay: Yang Teramat Mulia).

== Royal consorts of Selangor ==
Name	Reign	Sultan	Notes
Tengku Ampuan Tengah binti Raja Haji	1796 – 27 October 1826	Sultan Ibrahim Shah ibni Almarhum Sultan Salehuddin Shah	The first Tengku Ampuan of Selangor
Tengku Ampuan Basik binti Arung To' Mojong	? – 6 January 1857	Sultan Muhammad Shah ibni Almarhum Sultan Ibrahim Shah	
Tengku Ampuan Affah Binti Al-Marhum Sultan Muhammad Shah	1844 – 1873	Sultan Sir Abdul Samad Shah ibni Almarhum Raja Abdullah	Daughter of the third Sultan of Selangor
Tengku Ampuan Paduka Seri Negara Tunku Maharum binti Tengku Dziauddin	1898 – 1908	Sultan Alauddin Sulaiman Shah ibni Almarhum Raja Musa	First wife of Sulaiman, died during reign
Tengku Ampuan Raja Zubaidah binti Almarhum Sultan Abdul Jalil	May 1910 – 17 October 1918	Sultan Alauddin Sulaiman Shah ibni Almarhum Raja Musa	Daughter of Sultan Abdul Jalil Nasiruddin of Perak, sixth wife of Sulaiman, died during reign
Tengku Ampuan Raja Fatimah binti Almarhum Sultan Idris Murshidul Azzam Shah	September 1921 – 31 March 1938	Sultan Alauddin Sulaiman Shah ibni Almarhum Raja Musa	Daughter of Sultan Idris Shah I of Perak, ninth wife of Sulaiman
Tengku Ampuan Hajah Jemaah binti Almarhum Raja Ahmad	26 January 1939 – 1 April 1960	Sultan Sir Hisamuddin Alam Shah Al-Haj Ibni Almarhum Sultan Alaeddin Sulaiman Shah	Also reigned as the second Raja Permaisuri Agong of Malaya
Tengku Permaisuri Sharifah Mastura binti Syed Ahmad Shahabuddin	15 January 1942 – 14 September 1945	Sultan Musa Ghiatuddin Riayat Shah Ibni Al-Marhum Sultan Alauddin Sulaiman Shah	The first Tengku Permaisuri of Selangor
Tengku Ampuan Hajah Rahimah binti Almarhum Sultan Abdul Aziz Langkat	28 June 1961 – 27 June 1993	Sultan Salahuddin Abdul Aziz Shah Al-Haj ibni Almarhum Sultan Hisamuddin Alam Shah Al-Haj	
Tengku Permaisuri Siti Aishah binti Abdul Rahman	28 October 1998 – 21 November 2001	Sultan Salahuddin Abdul Aziz Shah Al-Haj ibni Almarhum Sultan Hisamuddin Alam Shah Al-Haj	Also reigned as the eleventh Raja Permaisuri Agong of Malaysia
Tengku Permaisuri Hajah Norashikin binti Abdul Rahman	8 September 2016 – present	Sultan Sharafuddin Idris Shah Al-Haj ibni Almarhum Sultan Salahuddin Abdul Aziz Shah Al-Haj	Former news anchor with Radio Televisyen Malaysia (RTM)

== See also ==
- Selangor
- Sultan of Selangor
- House of Opu Daeng Chelak
- Yang di-Pertuan Agong
- Raja Permaisuri Agong
- Tengku Permaisuri of Selangor
- Queen consort
