= Tengku Ampuan Jemaah Mosque =

Mosque in Shah Alam, Selangor, Malaysia

- Masjid Tengku Ampuan Jemaah
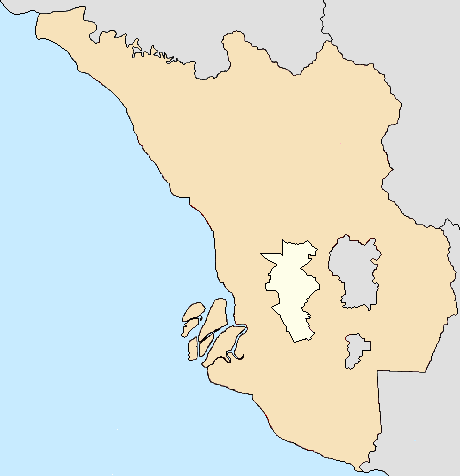
- Location within Shah Alam

Religion
- Affiliation: Islam
- Branch/tradition: Sunni
- Governing body: Jabatan Agama Islam Selangor

Location
- Location: Shah Alam, Selangor, Malaysia
- Interactive map of Tengku Ampuan Jemaah Mosque
- Coordinates: 3°05′58.4″N 101°32′19.5″E

Architecture
- Type: mosque
- Completed: 2012
- Minaret: 4

The Tengku Ampuan Jemaah Mosque (Malay: Masjid Tengku Ampuan Jemaah) or Bukit Jelutong Mosque is a Selangor's royal mosque located in Bukit Jelutong (Section U8) near Shah Alam, Malaysia. It is the second state mosque of Selangor after Sultan Salahuddin Abdul Aziz Shah Mosque in Section 14. This royal mosque was named after the consort of the late Almarhum Sultan Sir Hisamuddin Alam Shah, late Almarhumah Tengku Ampuan Jemaah of Selangor. She was also the second Raja Permaisuri Agong (Queen) of Malaysia.

== History ==
The mosque was built by Sime Darby Properties which is also a developer of Bukit Jelutong. Construction of the mosque began on 2010 and was completed on 2012. The mosque was officially opened by the Sultan Sharafuddin Idris Shah of Selangor on 13 March 2013.

The mosque's donation box was stolen in June 2024 and was not reported to the Jabatan Agama Islam Selangor.

== Architecture ==
Middle Eastern and Turkish influence

== See also ==
- Islam in Malaysia
