= Tengku Permaisuri Norashikin Hospital =

Hospital in Kajang, Hulu Langat, Selangor, Malaysia

Coordinates: 2°59′34″N 101°47′36″E

Tengku Permaisuri Norashikin Hospital Hospital Tengku Permaisuri Norashikin

Geography
- Location: Kajang, Selangor, Malaysia

Organisation
- Type: District
- Patron: None

Services
- Emergency department: Yes
- Beds: 306

History
- Founded: 1889

Links
- Website: http://hkjg.moh.gov.my/
- Lists: Hospitals in Malaysia

The Tengku Permaisuri Norashikin Hospital (Malay: Hospital Tengku Permaisuri Norashikin), previously known as the Kajang Hospital (Malay: Hospital Kajang) is a government-funded suburban general hospital located in Kajang, Hulu Langat District, Selangor, Malaysia.

== History ==
Kajang Hospital was initially founded in 1889 with the founding of the town. Back then, it was built on land measuring 16 acres (6.5 ha) about 30 kilometres (19 mi) northeast of Kuala Lumpur.

The hospital grew with the development of Kajang town and Hulu Langat district. The hospital had 250 beds in the 1970s and this has increased to 306 beds in 2010.

The hospital has gradually increased its number of buildings. The first permanent building which still stands until now was constructed in 1910. Another 4-storey block was added in 1976. Other blocks later added include the Food preparation block (1983), the morgue (1985) and the pathology unit (1992).

The latest building addition was carried out under the Hospital Redevelopment Project Phase 2, which was completed in 1999. The construction cost RM14.1 million and was funded by the Asian Development Bank. The building consists of 1st and 2nd class labour wards (22 beds), neonatal unit (20 beds), Operating Theatre block (2 theatres), Intensive Care Unit (6 beds), Paediatric block (22 beds) and the rehabilitation block.

The hospital also has a hemodialysis unit which was started in 2000.

== Renaming ==
On 13 February 2025, the Kajang Hospital was officially renamed to the Tengku Permaisuri Norashikin Hospital, named after the Tengku Permaisuri of Selangor Norashikin in an officiating ceremony attended by the Sultan of Selangor, Sultan Sharafuddin Idris Shah and Tengku Permaisuri Norashikin. The Women and Children Treatment Centre (WCC) of the hospital, which began operations on 07 October 2024, was also officially opened during the event.

== Administration ==
The hospital is managed by a Director, who is assisted by the management and services unit. The director reports to the State Health Deputy Director (Medical services) and the Selangor State Health Director.

The hospital has 13 departments and 12 units. It received the MS ISO 9001:2000 certification on 11 November 2005.
