= Sultan Sulaiman Mosque =

Historical mosque in Klang, Selangor, Malaysia

Sultan Sulaiman Royal Mosque
- Masjid Diraja Sultan Sulaiman مسجد دراج سلطان سليمان
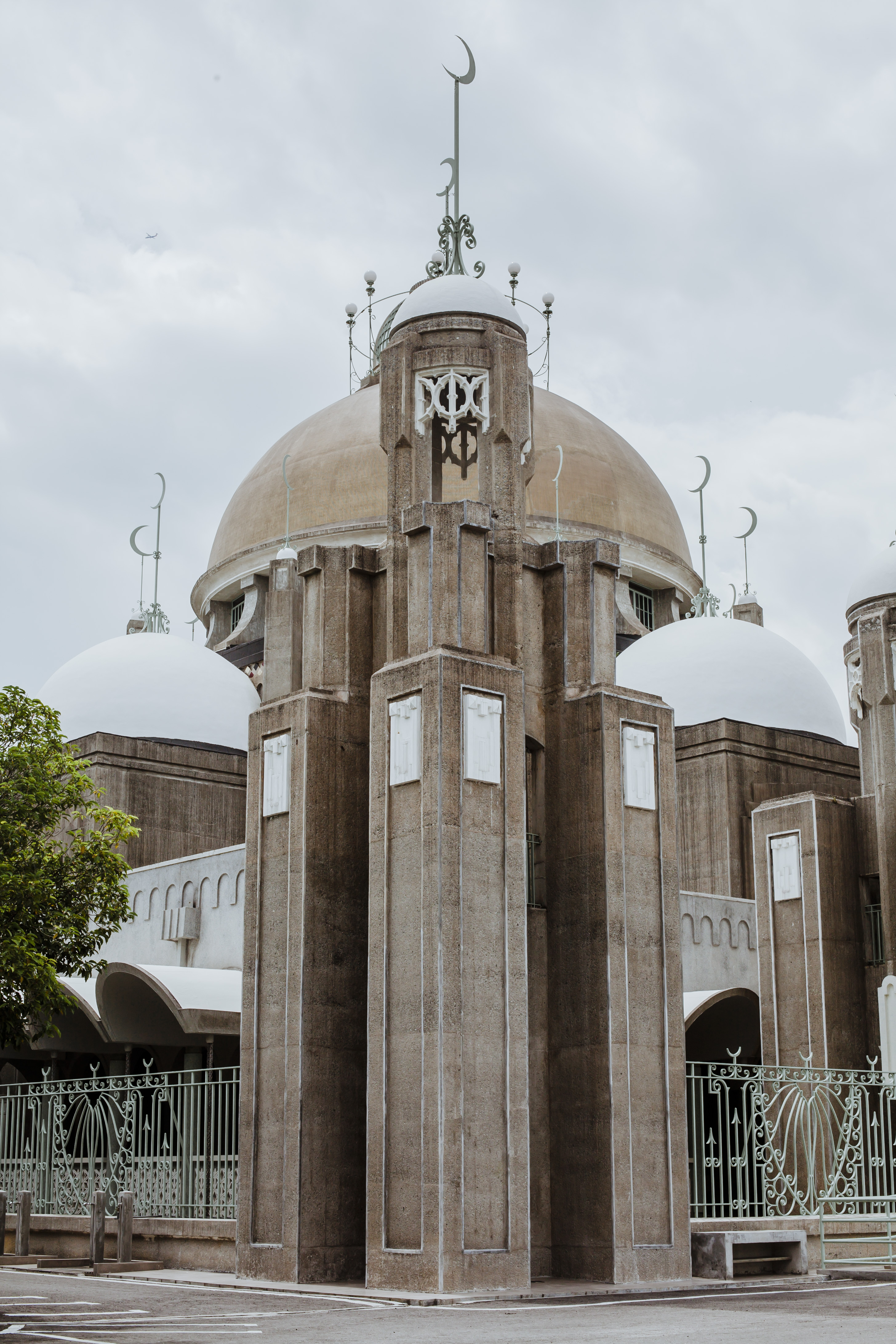

Religion
- Affiliation: Shafi'i

Location
- Location: Klang, Selangor, Malaysia 3°02′05″N 101°27′01″E
- Interactive map of Sultan Sulaiman Royal Mosque

Architecture
- Architect: Leofric Kesteven
- Style: Western Art Deco; Neoclassical; English architecture Moorish
- Groundbreaking: 1922
- Completed: 1923

Specifications
- Capacity: 1000
- Minaret: 1
- Minaret height: 136 feet

Sultan Sulaiman Royal Mosque (Malay: Masjid Diraja Sultan Sulaiman) is Selangor's royal mosque, which is located in Klang, Selangor, Malaysia. It was constructed by the British in the early 1922 and was officially opened in 1923 by the late Almarhum Sultan Sir Alaeddin Sulaiman Shah.

This mosque combines various types of architectural styles (such as Moorish and Art Deco) and interior and exterior designs not replicated in other mosques around the country. Sultan Sulaiman Mosque was the main state mosque of Selangor until the opening of Sultan Salahuddin Abdul Aziz Mosque in the new capital city of Shah Alam. Some of its interesting features include the Tangga Diraja (royal stairs) from Istana Alam Shah and a royal mausoleum. The late Sultan Salahuddin was buried in the mosque's grounds.

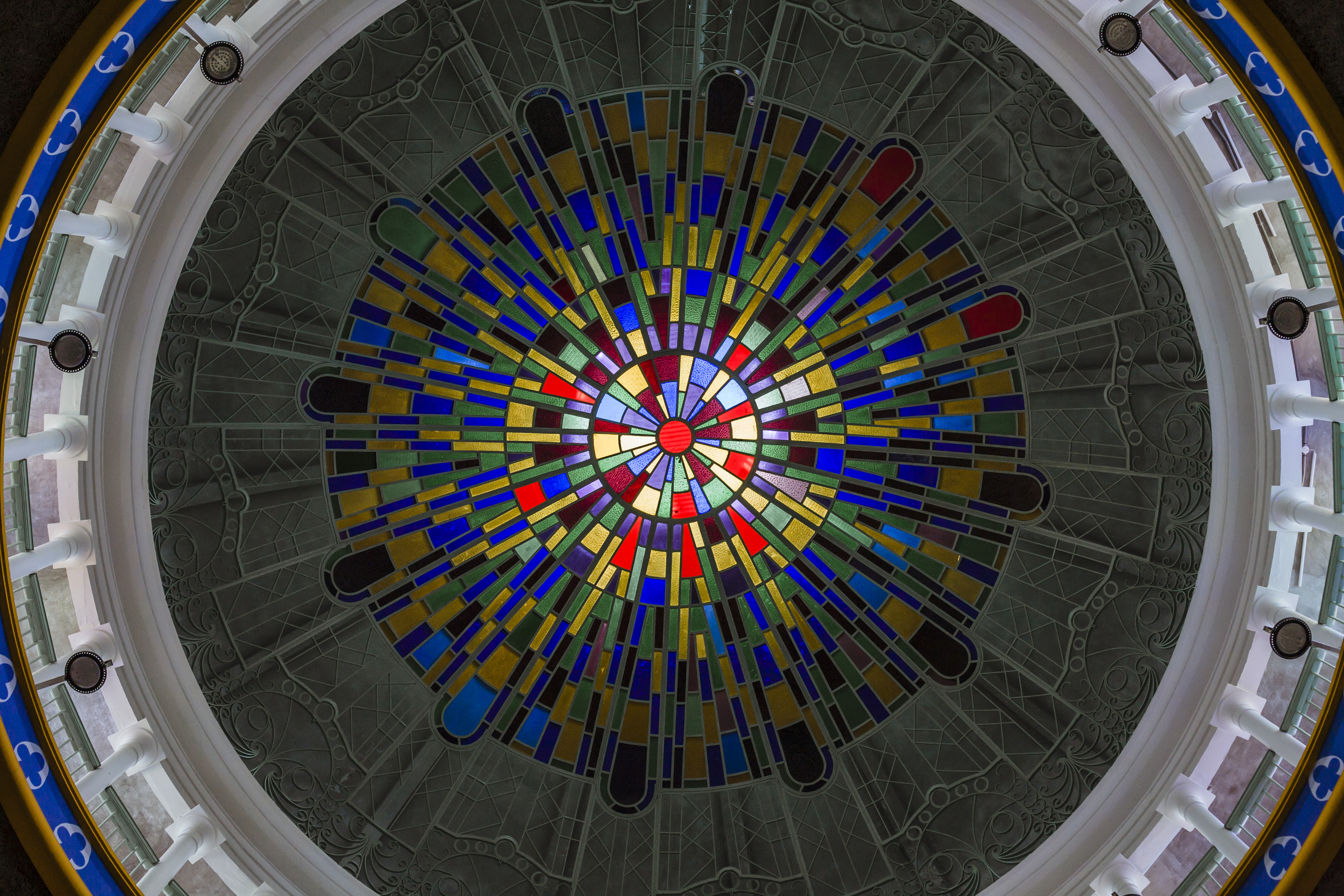
Multi-coloured patterned glass under the dome of Masjid Diraja Sultan Suleiman.

== Architecture ==
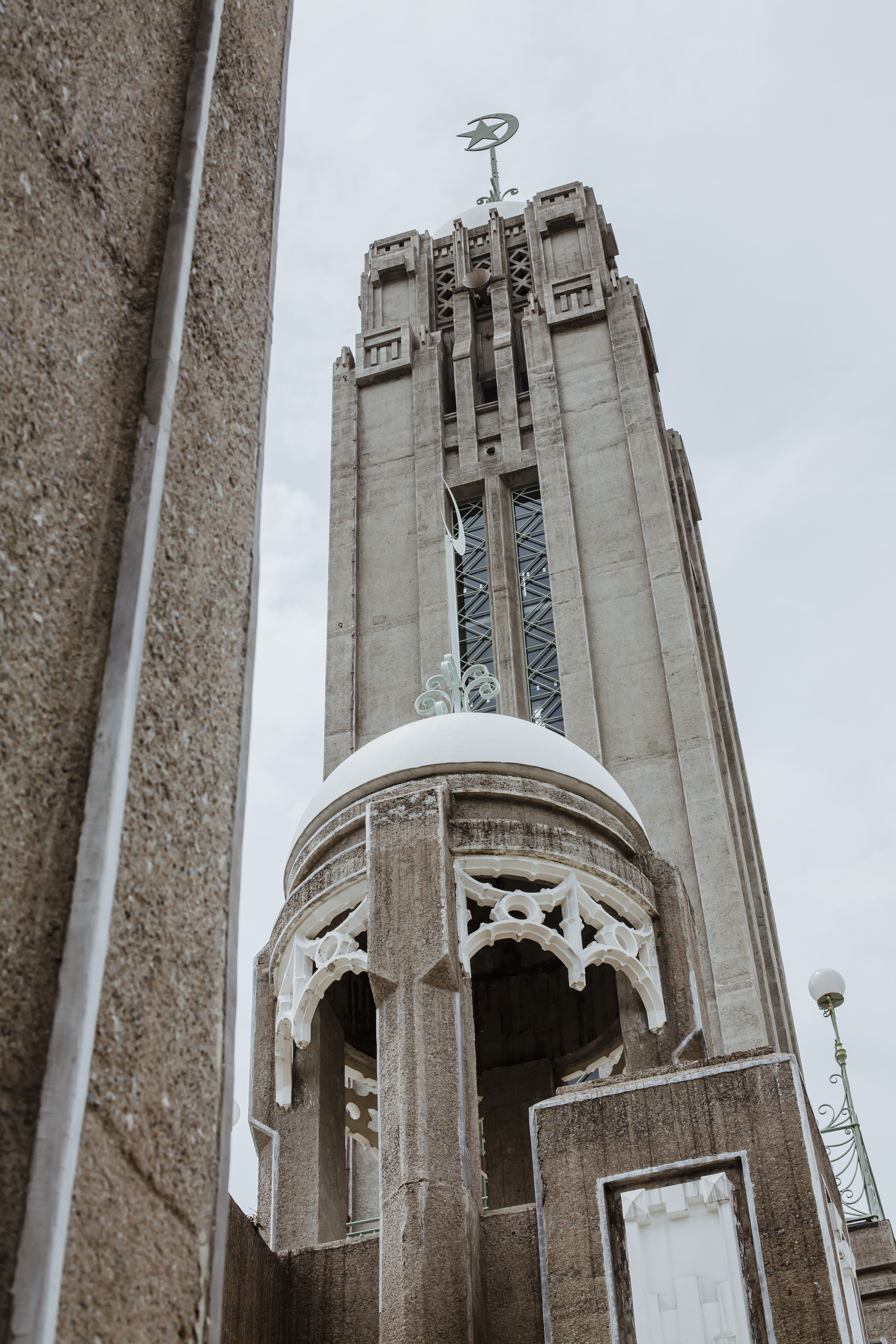
The minaret of Masjid Diraja Sultan Suleiman.

The design concept of the Sultan Sulaiman Mosque is quite different from other mosques in the state, as well as in the rest of Malaysia's as it notably exhibits a combination of influences of Islamic architecture, Moorish, English, Neoclassical cathedral, and most importantly, Western Art Deco styles. It was designed by the British architect Leofric Kesteven (1882–1974), who was the Chairman of the Malayan Institute of Architects from 1921 to 1923, along with John Thomas Chester, the reinforced concrete specialist attached to United Engineers Ltd; and Rodolfo Nolli, the Singapore-based Italian sculptor who worked on the ornaments of the building.

The semicircular-shaped dome of the mosque is painted in egg yellow, not gold. The large dome of the main prayer space is surrounded by four smaller domes. The main dome represents the Sultan of Selangor while the smaller domes refer to Dato' Besar Empat Suku Selangor. Five domes at the main entrance of the mosque symbolise the Five Pillars of Islam and five Daeng Brothers, while two umbrella-shaped domes are symbolic of the royal umbrella. There are eight smaller towers around the mosque and a large tower in the middle, with a higher entrance from the main porch. The tower is also decorated with yellow dome at the summit. The original design of the mosque was like a cross bar when viewed from above, as is so often used in church plans in Europe, but after renovations by the Selangor Islamic Religious Department (JAIS), the mosque now has a square footprint.

The present mosque has been through a number of processes and internal modifications; the most recent restoration was completed in 2017, which restored 70 panels of its colourful original bas-reliefs, which were covered with cement and white paint, which is the only kind found in mosques around Malaysia. The bas-reliefs feature the natural scenery and plants of Klang District. They are coloured brightly using hues of red, yellow, blue, and green.

The main prayer room Sultan Sulaiman Mosque is octagonal at the bottom, but it slowly smoothens into a circle at a height of 10 meters. The upper floors can be accessed with 'catladder'. There are decorative iron frames under the dome that support the multi-coloured patterned glass. The mosque was designed to accommodate about 1,000 pilgrims at a time.

== History ==
Sultan Sulaiman Mosque was given as a gift by the British Government to then-Sultan of Selangor, Sultan Sulaiman Alaeddin Shah to commemorate the declaration of Klang as a royal town and to replace the old and unsafe Pengkalan Batu Mosque which was demolished during the construction of Klang train station. He laid the foundation stone of this mosque in 1922.

According to history, before the building of the mosque commenced, a groundbreaking, qibla determination, and prayer ceremony was performed. This ceremony, attended by royalties, government officials, religious figures, architects and British officers, amongst others, was held in order to accurately pinpoint the position of qibla, or the direction towards the Kaaba in the Sacred Mosque in Mecca. The method used was through observing the shadows cast by vertical objects.

The mosque was officiated on 23 June 1923 by the Sultan, during a ceremony attended by the public as well as some prominent guests including the Raja Muda of Selangor, TS Adams (The British Resident of Selangor), L. Kesteven (the architect of the mosque), Raja Haji Othman (Chief Kadhi) besides various Malay chiefs, religious officers and European officials. During its opening, the mosque was reportedly the largest mosque in the then-Federated Malay States. Originally, this mosque was known as Masjid Suleiman Jamiur Rahman and it served as Selangor's state mosque until the completion of Sultan Salahuddin Abdul Aziz Mosque in Shah Alam in 1988. The Sultan Sulaiman Mosque remained as the royal mosque.

In May 2012, the mosque was declared a National Heritage Building under the National Heritage Act 2005 (Act 645). The building underwent a number of upgrades and renovations in 1933, 1949, 1953–54, 1958, 1966, 1968, 1970s, 1980s, 1990s and 2000s. Between March 2015 and October 2017, the mosque was closed to the public for restoration works that cost 12 million ringgit and aimed to retain the original architecture and design of the mosque. The conservation project involved processes that included the cleaning of the mural surfaces, treatments to strengthen the murals and painting some parts of the mosque including in the main prayer room.

== Royal Mausoleum ==
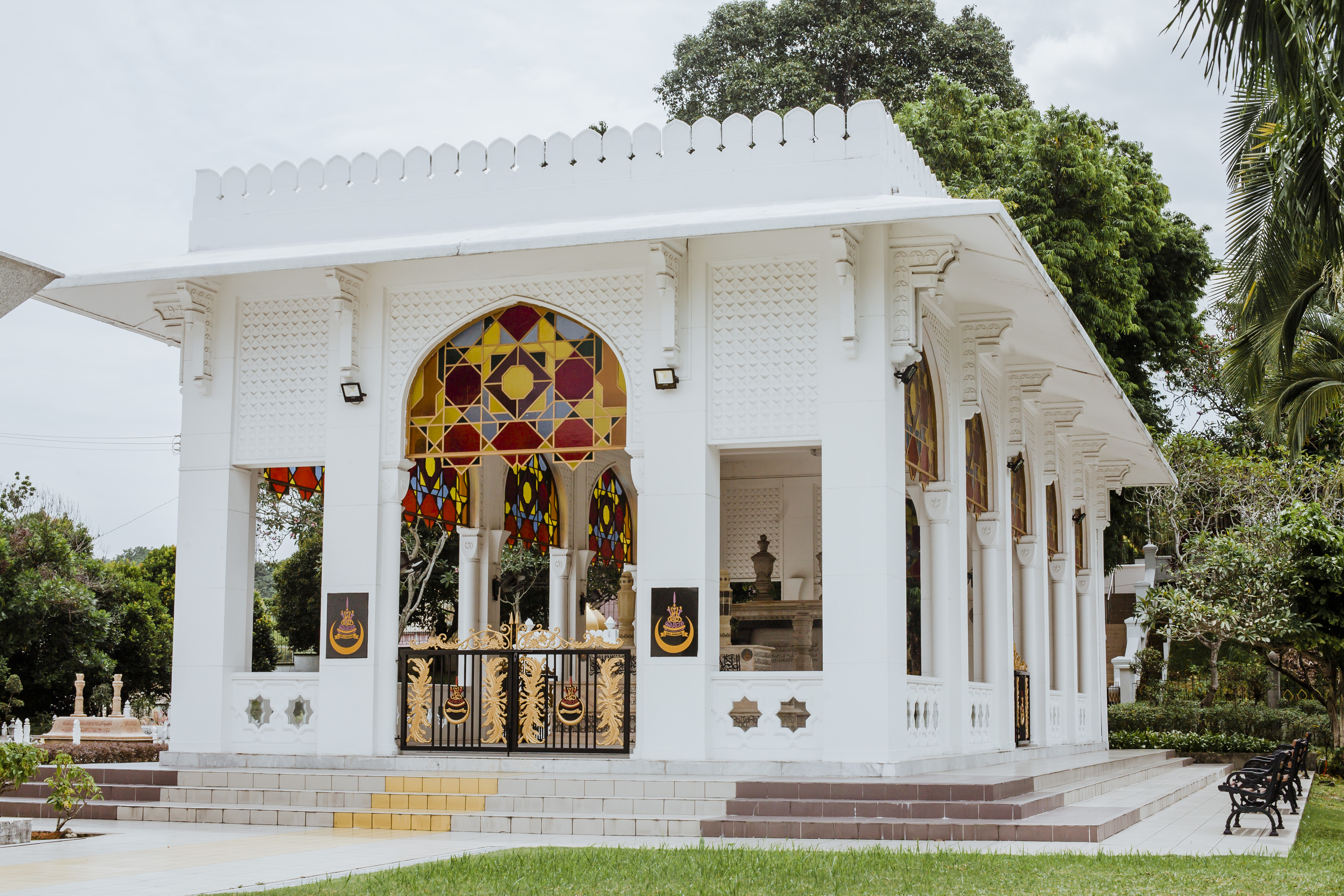
The Royal Mauseleum at Masjid Diraja Sultan Suleiman

This is a list of sultans and members of the royal family who have been laid to rest in the mosque.

=== Sultan graves ===
- Sultan Sir Alaeddin Sulaiman Shah ibni Raja Muda Musa Ghiatuddin Riayat Shah I (died: 31 March 1938)
- Sultan Sir Musa Ghiatuddin Riayat Shah II ibni Sultan Sir Alaeddin Sulaiman Shah (died: 8 November 1955)
- Sultan Sir Hisamuddin Alam Shah ibni Sultan Sir Alaeddin Sulaiman Shah – 2nd Yang di-Pertuan Agong (1960) (died: 1 September 1960)
- Sultan Salahuddin Abdul Aziz Shah ibni Sultan Sir Hisamuddin Alam Shah – 11th Yang di-Pertuan Agong (1999–2001) (died: 21 November 2001)

=== Tengku Ampuan/Pemaisuri graves (Graves of Royal Consorts) ===
- Raja Fatimah binti Sultan Idris I Murshidul al-Azzham Shah( died 8 April 1983)
- Tengku Pemaisuri Sharifah Mastura binti Syed Shahabuddin of Kedah (died 1958)
- Tengku Ampuan Jemaah binti Raja Ahmad (died: 8 April 1973)
- Tengku Ampuan Rahimah binti Sultan Abdul Aziz Langkat (died: 27 June 1993)

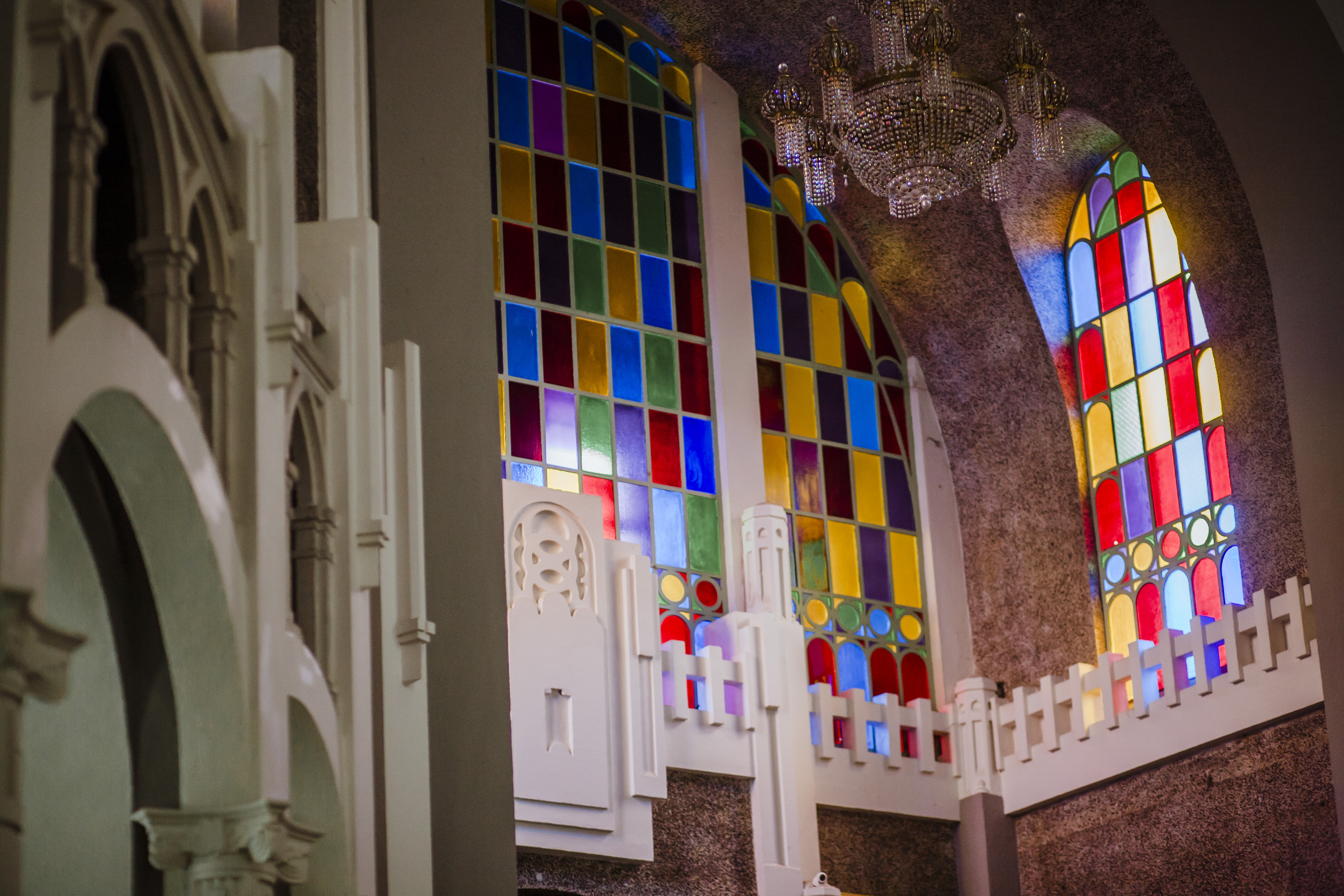
The colourful interior of Masjid Diraja Sultan Suleiman

=== Royal family graves ===
- Raja Azmi binti Raja Hussein Sulaiman Al-Halip – Malay actors and singers (died 1974)
- Raja Tun Haji Sir Uda bin Raja Mohammad – Second Menteri Besar (Chief Minister) of Selangor 2 and 4 (1949–1953, 1954–1955) and first Yang di-Pertua Negeri (Governor) of Penang (1957–1967) (died 1976)
  - Raja Haji Kamaruddin Shah ibni Raja Tun Haji Sir Uda Shah - (died 7 July 1970)
- Tengku Hajah Raihani binti Sultan Sir Alaeddin Sulaiman Shah (Tengku Ampuan of Brunei 1934–1950) (died 22 September 1993)
- Tengku Khaladiah binti Sultan Sir Alaeddin Sulaiman Shah (died 2013)
- Tengku Azman Shah ibni Sultan Sir Hisamuddin Alam Shah – Tengku Bendahara Selangor (died 2014)
- Tengku Toh Puan Nur Sa'adah binti Sultan Sir Alaeddin Sulaiman Shah (died 2014)
- Tengku Muhammad Yusof Shah ibni Sultan Sir Alaeddin Sulaiman Shah – Tengku Aris Temenggong Selangor (died 3 January 2018)
- Tengku Ismail Shah Ibni Sultan Hisamuddin Alam Shah – Tengku Besar Putra Selangor (died 2019)
- Tengku Thuraya binti Sultan Ibrahim – Tengku Puan Bendahara Selangor (died 2021)

== Transportation ==
Seranas Group bus route 702, Smart Selangor bus route KLG3a and KLG3b from KTM Klang; and rapidKL T722 from LRT Jambatan Kota, via Jalan Kota Raja Federal Route 190.

== See also ==
- Islam in Malaysia
- Abidin Mosque, Kuala Terengganu, Terengganu
- Al-Muktafi Billah Shah Mosque, Kuala Terengganu, Terengganu
- Bukit Melawati, Kuala Selangor, Selangor
- Sultan Abdul Samad Mausoleum, Jugra, Kuala Langat, Selangor
- Shah Alam Royal Mausoleum, Selangor
- Arau Royal Mausoleum, Arau, Perlis
- Kedah Royal Mausoleum, Langgar, Kota Setar, Kedah
- Kelantan Royal Mausoleum, Langgar, Kota Bharu, Kelantan
- Abu Bakar Royal Mosque, Kuala Pahang, Pekan, Pahang
- Pahang Old Royal Mausoleum, Kuala Pahang, Pekan, Pahang
- Al-Ghufran Royal Mausoleum, Kuala Kangsar, Perak
- Mahmoodiah Royal Mausoleum, Tanjong Putri, Johor Bahru, Johor
- Seri Menanti Royal Mausoleum, Seri Menanti, Kuala Pilah, negeri 9
