= Tengku Ampuan Jemaah =

Raja Permaisuri Agong in 1960

Jema'ah جماعه
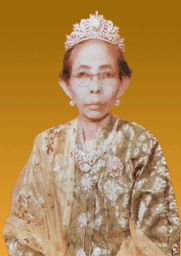

Queen consort of the Federation of Malaya
- Tenure: 14 April 1960 – 1 September 1960
- Predecessor: Tunku Kurshiah
- Successor: Tengku Budriah

Tengku Ampuan of Selangor
- Tenure: 26 January 1939 – 1 April 1960
- Predecessor: Tengku Ampuan Fatimah
- Successor: Tengku Ampuan Rahimah
- Born: Raja Jema'ah binti Raja Ahmad; 1900; Bandar Termasha, Kuala Langat, Selangor
- Died: 8 April 1973 (aged 72–73); Klang, Selangor
- Burial: Royal Mausoleum, Klang, Selangor
- Spouse: Sultan Hisamuddin Alam Shah (m. 1920; died 1960)
- Issue: Sultan Salahuddin Abdul Aziz Shah
Regnal name
- Tengku Ampuan Hajah Jema'ah binti Almarhum Raja Ahmad
- House: Opu Daeng Chelak
- Father: Raja Ahmad of Selangor
- Mother: Raja Fatima binti Raja Tahir
- Religion: Sunni Islam

Tengku Ampuan Hajah Jema'ah binti Almarhum Raja Ahmad (Jawi: تڠكو امڤوان حاجه جماعه بنت المرحوم راج احمد; born Raja Jema'ah binti Raja Ahmad; 1900 – 8 April 1973) was the Tengku Ampuan (Queen dowager) from 1960 until her death in 1973. She served as the Tengku Ampuan (Queen consort) of Selangor and the 2nd Raja Permaisuri Agong (Queen of the Federation of Malaya) during the brief reign of her husband Hisamuddin, the Yang di-Pertuan Agong, at the time.

== Biography ==
Born in 1900, in Bandar Termasha, Kuala Langat, Selangor, she was a member of a junior branch of the Selangor royal family. She was a descendant of the first Sultan of Selangor. She received her early education in a Malay school near the Bandar Termasha Palace.

In 1920, Tengku Ampuan Jema'ah married Sultan Hisamuddin Alam Shah who was then the royal escort to Sultan Alaiddin Sulaiman Shah. In 1924, hence she became the special escort to Tengku Ampuan Fatimah.

In 1926, Tengku Ampuan Jema'ah gave birth to a son, Tengku Abdul Aziz Shah, who later became the 8th Sultan of Selangor.

In 1952, Tengku Ampuan Jema'ah performed the pilgrimage in Makkah and in the following year she accompanied Sultan Hishamuddin Alam Shah for the coronation of Queen Elizabeth II in United Kingdom.

Her husband, Sultan Alam Shah, died of a mysterious illness at the Istana Tetamu in Kuala Lumpur on 1 September 1960 - the day fixed for his installation, and a day after the third anniversary of Hari Merdeka. According to then Prime Minister Tunku Abdul Rahman, the ruler had been struck down by illness after using the royal regalia in advance of his installation. His death occurred after 27 days of illness. He was buried at the Royal Mausoleum near Sultan Sulaiman Mosque in Klang, Selangor on 3 September 1960.

Following her husband's death, Tengku Ampuan Jema'ah lived in quiet retirement until her death on 8 April 1973.

Her only child succeeded his father as Sultan of Selangor and as Sultan Salahuddin Abdul Aziz Shah ibni Almarhum Sultan Hisamuddin Alam Shah Al-Haj. He also reigned as Malaysia's eleventh Yang di-Pertuan Agong. But like his father, he died while in office.

== Social contributions ==
Tengku Ampuan Jema'ah had a keen interest in trying out various types of handicraft at the palace. She was good at knitting, embroidery and patch work. When she moved to Klang, she gathered women from the villages and started a handicraft training programme for them. The craftwork was sent to Raffles Hotel in Singapore under the brand name "Pertukangan Tangan Melayu Selangor" (The Selangor Malay Handicrafts) and sponsored by the wife of the Governor of Singapore back then. The Malay Handicrafts Shop was first opened in Klang. Subsequently, another branch was opened at the Robinson Shop in Kuala Lumpur with the assistance of its manager.

The "Gerai Selangor" (Selangor Booth) at the Malaysian Agriculture, Horticulture and Agrotourism (MAHA) exhibition in Kuala Lumpur attracted many European tourists. Several awards for silverwork won by the said booth are on display at the Istana Shah Alam Museum. These awards were the result of Tengku Ampuan Jemaah's effort.

== Awards and recognitions ==
- First Class of the Royal Family Order of Selangor (DK I) (1973)

=== Places named after her ===
Several places were named after her, including:

- Tengku Ampuan Jemaah Hospital in Sabak Bernam, Selangor
- Tengku Ampuan Jemaah Mosque in Shah Alam, Selangor
- SAM Tengku Ampuan Jemaah, secondary school in Sungai Besar, Selangor
- SAMT Tengku Ampuan Jemaah, secondary school in Shah Alam, Selangor
- SMK Tengku Ampuan Jemaah, secondary school in Pelabuhan Klang, Selangor

== Ancestry ==
Ancestors of Tengku Ampuan Jemaah

4.
2. Raja Ahmad
5.
1. Raja Jemaah
6. Raja Tahir
3. Raja Fatimah
7.

Malaysian royalty
Preceded by Tunku Kurshiah (Tunku Ampuan of Negeri Sembilan)	Raja Permaisuri Agong (Queen of Malaysia)	Succeeded by Tengku Budriah (Raja Perempuan of Perlis)
