= Tengku Ampuan Rahimah =

Queen Consort of Selangor from 1961 to 1992

Rahimah رحيمة

Tengku Ampuan of Selangor
- Tenure: 28 June 1961 – 26 June 1992
- Predecessor: Tengku Ampuan Jemaah
- Successor: Permaisuri Siti Aishah
- Born: 4 August 1928; Kota Dalam, Langkat, North Sumatra, Dutch East Indies (now Indonesia)
- Died: 26 June 1992 (aged 63); Istana Alam Shah, Klang, Selangor, Malaysia
- Burial: Royal Mausoleum, Klang, Selangor
- Spouse: Sultan Salahuddin Abdul Aziz Shah
- Issue: Tengku Puteri Nor Marina; Tengku Puteri Nor Zehan
Names
- Tengku Rahimah binti Almarhum Sultan Abdul Aziz (as birth)
- House: Langkat (by birth); Opu Daeng Chelak (by marriage and blood)
- Father: Sultan Abdul Aziz Abdul Jalil Rahmat Shah ibni al-Marhum Sultan Haji Musa al-Khalid al-Mu'azzam Shah
- Mother: Tengku Putri Zahra binti al-Marhum Sultan Alauddin Sulaiman Shah
- Religion: Sunni Islam

Tengku Ampuan Hajah Rahimah binti Almarhum Sultan Abdul Aziz Abdul Jalil Rahmat Shah (Jawi: تڠکو امڤوان حاجه رحيمة بنت المرحوم سلطان عبدالعزيز عبدالجليل رحمت شاه; 4 August 1928 – 26 June 1992) was the Tengku Ampuan of Selangor, Malaysia during the reign of her husband, Sultan Salahuddin of Selangor.

== Biography ==
She was born on 4 August 1928, as the posthumous daughter of Paduka Sri Tuanku Sultan Abdul Aziz Abdul Jalil Rahmat Shah ibni al-Marhum Sultan Haji Musa al-Khalid al-Mu'azzam Shah, Sultan of Langkat and Tengku Putri Zahra binti al-Marhum Sultan Alauddin Sulaiman Shah, daughter of Colonel Paduka Sri Sultan Sir Alauddin Sulaiman Shah ibni al-Marhum Yang di-Pertuan Muda Musa, Sultan and Yang di-Pertuan of the State of Selangor Darul Ehsan, GCMG, KCVO.

She married as his third chronological wife, at Selangor Palace, Kuala Lumpur, on 10 March 1956 at the age of 28, to Paduka Sri Sultan Salehuddin 'Abdu'l Aziz Shah Alhaj ibni al-Marhum Sultan Hishamuddin Alam Shah Alhaj, by the Grace of Allah, Sultan and Ruler of the State of Selangor Dar ul-Ihsan and all its dependencies.

She was appointed as Raja Puan Muda (Crown Princess) of Selangor on 13 May 1958, and installed as Tengku Ampuan (Queen Consort) of Selangor at Alam Shah Palace, Klang on 28 June 1961. She was, hence, named Tengku Ampuan Hajah Rahimah binti al-Marhum Sultan 'Abdu'l Aziz 'Abdu'l Jalil Rahmat Shah.

== Death ==
At the morning of 6:00 am she was found dead in bed. She had died in her sleep 2 hours 15 minutes prior, at 3:45 am on 26 June 1992 at the age of 64 and was buried in the Royal Mausoleum near Sultan Sulaiman Mosque in Klang.

== Issue ==
The royal couple had two daughters:

- Tengku Puteri Nor Marina (born 15 October 1956).
- Tengku Puteri Nor Zehan (born 18 November 1958).

== Legacy ==
Several buildings were named after her;

- Tengku Ampuan Rahimah Hospital (In Malay; Hospital Tengku Ampuan Rahimah a.k.a. HTAR)- a general hospital of Klang which was opened in 1985.
  - Hospital Tengku Ampuan Rahimah LRT station - a light rapid transit (LRT) station on Shah Alam Line serving the hospital.
- SMK Tengku Ampuan Rahimah - a secondary school located in Klang.
- Sekolah Agama Menengah Tinggi Tengku Ampuan Rahimah (SAMTTAR) - an Islamic secondary school in Banting, Selangor.

== Honours ==
=== Honours of Selangor ===
- Selangor
  - First Class of the Royal Family Order of Selangor (DK I) (1963)
  - Knight Grand Commander of the Order of the Crown of Selangor (SPMS) - Datin Paduka Seri
  - Knight Grand Companion of the Order of Sultan Salahuddin Abdul Aziz Shah (SSSA) - Datin Paduka Seri

=== Honours of Malaysia and sultanates ===
- Kelantan
  - Knight Grand Commander of the Order of the Crown of Kelantan (SPMK) - Dato' (1988)
