= Royal Family Order of Selangor =

Honorific order of the Sultanate of Selangor

The Most Esteemed Royal Family Order of Selangor Darjah Kerabat Selangor Yang Amat Dihormati

Awarded by the Sultan of Selangor
- Type: Dynastic
- Founded: First class: 6 June 1961; Second class: 1977
- Royal house: House of Opu Daeng Chelak
- Ribbon: Yellow; Red
- Eligibility: Members of the Selangor and other Royal families, and to high officers of state
- Status: Currently constituted
- Founder: Sultan Salahuddin Abdul Aziz Shah
- Sovereign: Sultan Sharafuddin Idris Shah
- Classes: First class; Second class
- Post-nominals: D.K. I; D.K.II

Statistics
- First induction: 28 March 1963
- Last induction: 11 December 2025
- Total inductees: Maximum 25 people

Precedence
- Next (higher): None
- Next (lower): Order of the Crown of Selangor
- First class Second class Ribbon bars

The Most Esteemed Royal Family Order of Selangor (Malay: Darjah Kerabat Selangor Yang Amat Dihormati) is an order awarded by Sultan of Selangor to members of the Selangor and other Royal families, and to high officers of state. It is the highest award that can be represented in Selangor. The First Class order was founded in 1961 while the Second Class in 1977.

== Criteria ==
The Darjah Kerabat Selangor Yang Amat Dihormati is awarded in two classes.

The First Class is awarded to the member of Royal Family in Malaysia. In addition, it is also awarded to the rulers of other countries as a sign of respect and friendship with the Sultan. The maximum number of recipient at one time is 25 people.

The Second Class is awarded to the member of Royal Family in Malaysia. It was also awarded as a tribute to the Princes and Princesses of the King of the Foreign Countries as a sign of respect and fellowship with the Sultan. High officers who have contributed excellent services to the Sultan or the Selangor State Government are also eligible to receive this award.

== Appearance ==
=== First Class ===
It is awarded in a set of breast star, a collar with a lesser star, a yellow coloured sash with red stripe, worn from the left shoulder to the right waist and a lesser star for the sash.

The collar is made of 101.6 cm long gold-plated metal which is worn on the same length at the front and back, containing 14 chain link joints. The two links in the middle have the engraving of the symbol of Selangor state on a crescent moon. Other links are ovoid in shape. The engraving on the links consist of two crossed keris blades, alternating with a crescent moon, surrounded by coconut leaves.

The collar's star has five points. It is made of gold-plated metal. Its surface is lined up with gems. In the middle of the star is a crown and a Selangor state symbol, with thin red enamel as its based. It is surrounded by coconut leaves.

The badge is made up of a five pointed star. The badge is 7.62 cm and made of gold-plated metal. The crown and Selangor state symbol are engraved in the center. The base is made of shadowed thin red enamel and decorated with coconut leaves engravings. This badge is attached on top of a silver-plated ten-pointed star.

=== Second Class ===
It is awarded in a set of breast star, a collar with a lesser star, a yellow coloured sash with two red stripes in the middle, worn from the left shoulder to the right waist and a lesser star for the sash.

The collar is made of gold-plated metal and contains 14 chain links. The Selangor state emblem on a crescent moon is engraved on the center link. The other links are round in shape. Engraved on its surface are a keris cross, alternating with a chain bearing the word of Allah in Jawi letters. The collar's star is gold in colour. The surface is engraved with a composition of coconut leaves.

The badge is golden enamel in colour and has red enamel coconut leaves engravings.

The sash is made up of 101.6mm wide silk. It is yellow in colour with two red stripes.

== Recipients ==
#	Name	Year	Awards
1	Tengku Ampuan Rahimah	28 March 1963	DK I
2	Tunku Abdul Rahman	8 March 1965	DK I
3	Sultan Yahya Petra	24 March 1966	DK I
4	Tuanku Syed Putra	7 May 1970	DK I
5	Tengku Ampuan Jemaah	7 June 1973	DK I
6	Sultan Sharafuddin Idris Shah	7 June 1973	DK I
7	Sultan Ismail Al Khalidi	27 March 1975	DK I
8	Hussein Onn	23 June 1977	DK II
9	Tuanku Abdul Halim Mu'adzam Shah	22 June 1978	DK I
10	Sultan Mahmud Al-Muktafi Billah Shah Al-Haj	22 June 1978	DK II
11	Tengku Badli Shah Ibni Almarhum Sultan Hisamuddin Alam Shah	24 May 1979	DK II
12	Tuanku Ja'afar	2 September 1982	DK I
13	Almutawakkil Alallah Sultan Iskandar Alhaj	10 October 1985	DK I
14	Sultan Azlan Muhibbuddin Shah	10 October 1985	DK I
15	Sultan Hassanal Bolkiah Mu'izzaddin Waddaulah	10 October 1985	DK I
16	Tengku Ampuan Bariah	10 October 1985	DK I
17	Raja Zarina binti Raja Tan Sri Zainal	10 October 1985	DK II
18	Sultan Ahmad Shah Al-Musta'in Billah	16 July 1987	DK I
19	Sultan Ismail Petra	13 November 1988	DK I
20	Tunku Abdul Malik	20 July 1989	DK II
21	Tunku Hajah Raudzah binti Almarhum Sultan Hisamuddin Alam Shah	2 July 1992	DK II
22	Tengku Azman Shah Alhaj Ibni Almarhum Sultan Hisamuddin Alam Shah	2 July 1992	DK II
23	Permaisuri Siti Aishah	22 November 1996	DK I
24	Tengku Thuraya binti Almarhum Sultan Ibrahim	22 November 1996	DK II
25	Paduka Bonda Raja Raja Nur Saidatul Ihsan binti Tengku Badar Shah	10 April 2003	DK I
26	Tuanku Syed Sirajuddin	10 April 2003	DK I
27	Al-Wathiqu Billah Sultan Mizan Zainal Abidin	10 April 2003	DK I
28	Mahathir Mohamad	10 April 2003 returned on 11 December 2017	DK I
29	Tengku Sulaiman Shah	10 April 2003	DK II
30	Sultan Nazrin Muizzuddin Shah	13 December 2003	DK II
31	Raja Permaisuri Bainun	2005	DK I
32	Tuanku Muhriz Ibni Almarhum Tuanku Munawir	21 January 2010	DK I
33	Tengku Indera Setia Ahmad Shah	21 January 2010	DK II
34	Sultan Ibrahim Ibni Almarhum Sultan Iskandar	13 January 2011	DK I
35	Sultan Muhammad V	13 January 2011	DK I
36	Tengku Muhammad Yusof Shah	16 February 2012	DK II
37	Sultan Nazrin Muizzuddin Shah	2014	DK I
38	Tengku Panglima Besar Abdul Samad	2014	DK II
39	Tengku Syarif Panglima Perlis Syed Zainal Anwar	2015	DK II
40	Tengku Permaisuri Norashikin	2016	DK I
41	Tengku Amir Shah	2016	DK I
42	Sultan Sallehuddin Ibni Almarhum Sultan Badlishah	2017	DK I
43	Tengku Puan Syarif Panglima Perlis Tengku Puteri Nor Zehan	11 December 2018	DK II
44	Al-Sultan Abdullah Ri'ayatuddin Al-Mustafa Billah Shah	11 December 2020	DK I
45	Raja Arshad Raja Tun Uda	11 December 2020	DK II
46	Tengku Ramli Alhaj Tengku Shahruddin Shah Alhaj	11 December 2021	DK II
47	Tunku Azizah Aminah Maimunah Iskandariah	11 December 2023	DK I
48	Tengku Putra Alhaj Tengku Azman Shah Alhaj	11 December 2023	DK II
49	Tengku Zerafina	11 December 2025	DK II

== See also ==
- Orders, decorations, and medals of the Malaysian states and federal territories#Selangor
- List of post-nominal letters (Selangor)
