= Raja Perempuan Budriah =

Raja Permaisuri Agong from 1960 to 1965

Budriah بدرية
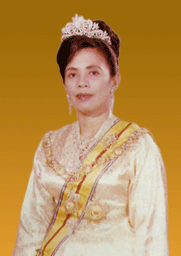

Queen consort of Malaysia
- Tenure: 21 September 1960 – 20 September 1965
- Installation: 4 January 1961
- Predecessor: Raja Jemaah
- Successor: Tengku Intan Zaharah

Raja Perempuan of Perlis
- Tenure: 19 January 1946 – 16 April 2000
- Coronation: 12 March 1949
- Successor: Tengku Fauziah

Raja Perempuan Besar of Perlis
- Tenure: 16 April 2000 – 28 November 2008
- Born: Tengku Budriah binti Tengku Ismail; 28 March 1924; Kuala Krai, Kelantan, Unfederated Malay States
- Died: 28 November 2008 (aged 84); Hospital Kuala Lumpur, Kuala Lumpur, Malaysia
- Burial: 29 November 2008; Perlis Royal Mausoleum, Arau
- Spouse: Tuanku Syed Putra Jamalullail (m. 1941; died 2000)
- Issue: Tuanku Syed Sirajuddin; Syed Badaruddin; Syed Amir Zainal Abidin; Syed Razlan; Syed Zainal Anwar; Sharifah Salwa; Sharifah Jalaina; Sharifah Azwan; Sharifah Junetta; Sharifah Endah
Names
- Tengku Budriah binti Almarhum Tengku Ismail
- Father: Tengku Ismail bin Tuan Besar of Patani Kingdom
- Mother: Tengku Besar Zubaidah binti Tengku Abdul Kadir of Patani Kingdom
- Religion: Sunni Islam

Raja Perempuan Besar Tengku Budriah binti Almarhum Tengku Ismail (Jawi: راج ڤرمڤوان بسر تڠکو بدرية بنت المرحوم تڠکو إسماعيل; 28 March 1924 – 28 November 2008) was the Raja Perempuan Besar (Queen dowager) of Perlis from 2000 until her death in 2008. She was previously the Raja Perempuan (Queen consort) of Perlis as the wife of Tuanku Syed Putra Jamalullail, Raja of Perlis. She served as the 3rd Raja Permaisuri Agong (Queen of Malaysia) from 1960 to 1965.

== Early life ==
She was born in Kuala Krai, Kelantan on 28 March 1924. She was the daughter of Almarhum Tengku Mek Haji Ismail Ibni HH Tuan Besar, the Raja of Pattani in Southern Thailand, and wife Tengku Besar Zubaidah binti Almarhum Tengku Abdul Kadir. Her late father, Tengku Mek Haji Ismail was son of HH Raja Tuan Besar Ibni Tuan Long Puteh, the third king of Pattani from Long Yunus dynasty of Kelantan while his mother was a daughter of the last king of Pattani, HH Sultan Abdul Kadir Kamaruddin Syah Ibni Sultan Sulaiman Syarafuddin Syah, brother of Tengku Muhammad Shah Of Pattani, Tengku Baniun of Pattani. Her younger sister, YM Tengku Tan Sri Noor Zakiah binti Almarhum Tengku Ismail, is the first Bumiputera female stockbroker in Malaysia and founder of Kenanga Investment Bank Berhad.

Her family ruled Pattani in south Thailand until it was overthrown by King Chulalongkorn in his effort to consolidate his hold on the southern part of that country. Tengku Budriah's grandfather, the former Sultan Abdul Kadir Kamaruddin Ibni Sultan Sulaiman Sharafuddin (Tuan Long Bongsu) of Patani, withdrew to Kelantan. The ruling family of Kelantan was distantly related to that of Patani. Long Muhammad Ibni Raja Muda Long Ismail, the grandson of Long Yunus (King of united Kelantan) was appointed by Siam to rule Pattani after he reconciled and give up his right on Kelantanese throne to his cousin, Long Senik Mulut Merah (Sultan Muhammad II of Kelantan).

Tengku Budriah was brought up in a family which had a simple way of life. She was noted for her gentleness and politeness. By her active involvement in uniformed organisations she developed herself into a personality with superior leadership traits.

She began her primary education in Kuala Krai Malay School when she was seven, then continued her education at Kuala Krai English School. Tengku Budriah later spent her Lower Secondary Education at the Anglo-Chinese Girls School in Ipoh, Perak. As an active person in extra-curricular activities, she was appointed as committee member in Brownies and Girl Guides, and would later attend the 1950 Girl Guides Jamboree in Australia.

Besides that, she was also active in sports where she represented her school team in badminton and hockey, and also enjoyed sewing, cooking, flower arrangement and horse riding.

== Marriage and becoming queen ==
At the age of 16, Tengku Budriah married Tuanku Syed Putra ibni Almarhum Syed Hassan Jamalullail, heir apparent of Perlis in 1941. She went on to bear him five princes and five princesses.

When he was exiled by the Japanese occupying forces during the second World War, she helped him run a small cake and sundry goods shop in Kota Bharu. After the 1945 Japanese surrender she returned to Perlis with her family, travelling by train to Padang Besar, then by manually operated railway trolley (Gek-gek) to Bukit Keteri since there was no train link.

Her husband became Raja of Perlis in 1945 and Tengku Budriah was installed Raja Perempuan or Queen of that state. Then in 1960 Tuanku Syed Putra was elected the third King of Malaysia (Yang di-Pertuan Agong) and Tengku Budriah accordingly became Queen (Raja Permaisuri Agong).

When her husband died in 2000, he was the world's longest reigning monarch. Her eldest son Tuanku Syed Sirajuddin also served as the Yang di-Pertuan Agong of Malaysia from 2001 till 12 December 2006. Her title after the death of the king was YMM (Yang Maha Mulia) Raja Perempuan Besar Perlis, which means HRH the Queen dowager of Perlis.

== Hobbies ==
Tengku Budriah spent most of her leisure time enjoying her favourite hobbies such as gardening, sewing, flower arrangement and cooking. She often cooked for her husband especially when they were on vacation abroad.

In later life she took up a new interest in painting flowers on dresses, scarves and porcelain for sale where profits made from the sales were donated to the welfare funds of Taman Asuhan Darulfarah. She also liked to spend time in her durian orchard.

== Charity work ==
Tengku Budriah took several initiatives to upgrade the welfare of the people of Perlis. She often visited schools and awarded school uniforms to poor students.

The royal family were pioneers in implementing the Foster Parents Project organised by the Women Institution (W.I.) of Perlis. Each royal family member would take one poor foster child to support for his education. This project succeeded in helping the poor students to continue their education to higher levels.

Tengku Budriah also played an active role in the progress and welfare of the women in the country. She acted as patron and chairman to several movements in the state and nationwide such as Perlis Women Institutions (W.I.), Perlis Muslim Women Welfare Association, Perlis Family Planning Association, Malaysian Women's Hockey Association, Perlis Children Welfare Board and Taman Asuhan Darulfarah.

In 2002 the nursery managed by Darulfarah was closed down and thus the name Taman Asuhan Darulfarah was changed to "Yayasan Amal Tengku Hajah Budriah" and the latest project was initiated through her ideas and commitment was the setting up of Tuanku Syed Putra Dialysis Centre built next to the existing Darulfarah building which was completed in June 2005 and the Syed Putra Foundation for Kidney Disease.

Tengku Budriah lived in quiet retirement in Perlis, though active in charitable organisations.

== Death ==
She died in her sleep at the age of 84 in Hospital Kuala Lumpur at 3:47am due to old age on 28 November 2008.

The Yang di-Pertuan Agong Tuanku Mizan Zainal Abidin and the Prime Minister Dato' Seri Abdullah Ahmad Badawi paid their last respects in Kuala Lumpur before her body was flown on a Royal Malaysian Air Force Hercules aircraft from Sultan Abdul Aziz Shah Airport to Sultan Abdul Halim Airport in Alor Star. Her body was then taken on a hearse (driven overland from the Sultan Abdul Halim-Kepala Batas Airport in Alor Star) to the royal town of Arau, where the local citizens were given an hour to pay their last respects; among them were the Sultan of Kedah Sultan Abdul Halim and the Sultanah of Kedah Sultanah Haminah. She was buried at the Perlis Royal Mausoleum in the afternoon.

== Awards and recognitions ==
She has been awarded:

=== Honours of Perlis ===
- Perlis
  - Member of the Perlis Family Order of the Gallant Prince Syed Putra Jamalullail (DK)
  - Knight Grand Companion of the Order of the Gallant Prince Syed Sirajuddin Jamalullail (SSPJ) – Dato' Seri Diraja (1995)

=== Malaysian Honours ===
- Malaya
  - Grand Commander of the Order of the Defender of the Realm (SMN) – Tun (1959)
  - Recipient of the Order of the Crown of the Realm (DMN) (1962)
- Malaysia
  - Recipient of the Malaysian Commemorative Medal (Gold) (PPM) (1965)
- Kelantan
  - Knight Grand Commander of the Order of the Crown of Kelantan (SPMK) – Dato' (1988)
  - Recipient of the Royal Family Order of Kelantan (DK) (1999)

=== Foreign Honours ===
- Thailand
  - Dame Grand Cross of the Order of Chula Chom Klao
- Japan
  - Grand Cordon of the Order of the Precious Crown (1964)
- Jordan
  - Grand Cordon Special Class of the Supreme Order of the Renaissance

=== Places named after her ===
Several places were named after her, including:

- Jalan Tengku Budriah in Arau, Perlis
- Taman Tengku Budriah in Arau, Perlis
- Rumah Kanak-Kanak Tengku Budriah in Cheras, Kuala Lumpur
- Sekolah Tengku Budriah, primary school in Arau, Perlis
- SMK Tengku Budriah, secondary school in Arau, Perlis
- SK Raja Perempuan Budriah, primary school in Simpang Empat, Perlis

Malaysian royalty
Preceded by Raja Jemaah (Tunku Ampuan of Selangor)	Raja Permaisuri Agong (Queen of Malaysia)	Succeeded by Tengku Intan Zaharah (Tengku Ampuan Besar of Terengganu)
