= Tengku Permaisuri Norashikin =

Queen consort of Selangor since 2016

Norashikin نور عشيقين
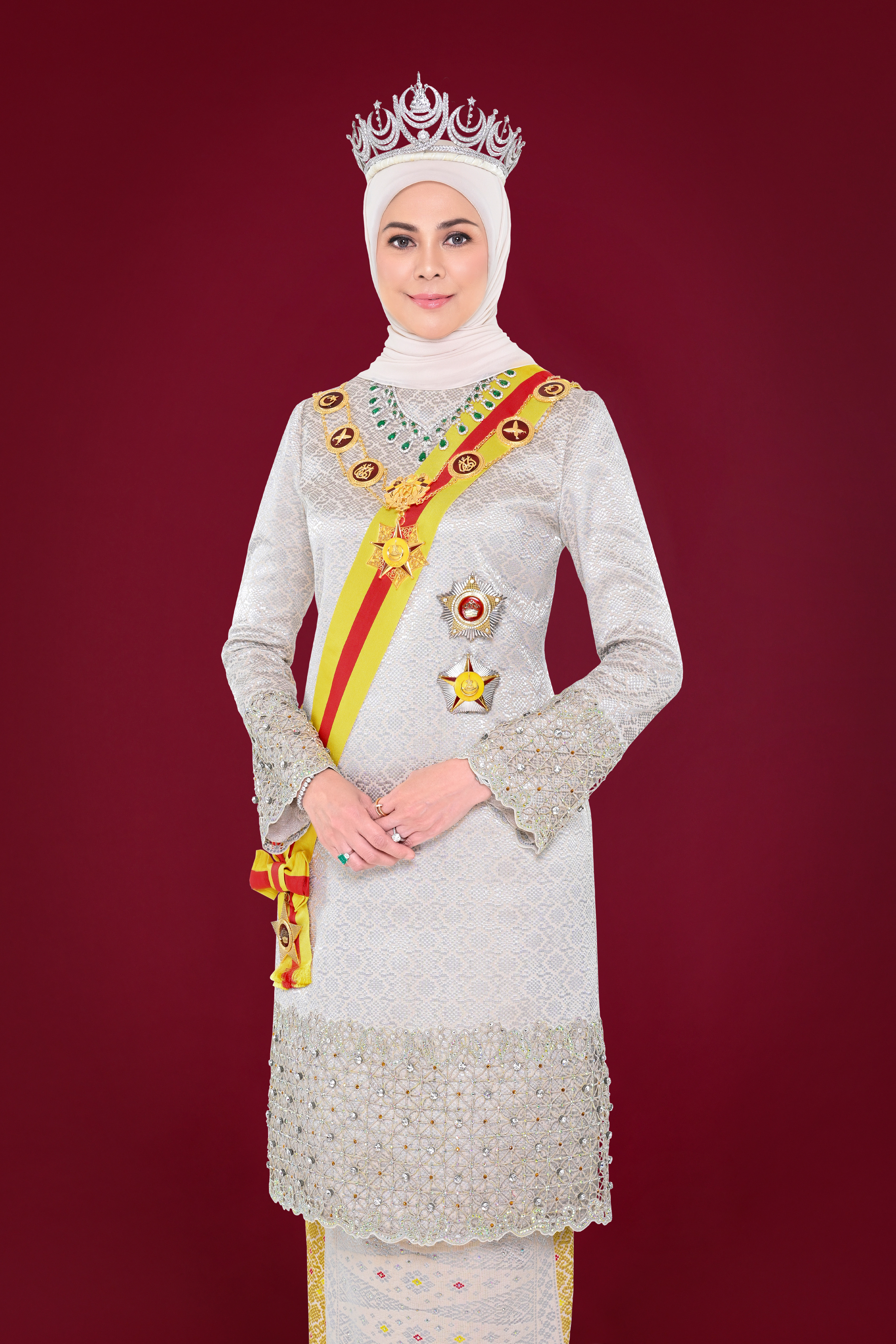

Tengku Permaisuri of Selangor
- Tenure: 31 August 2016 – present
- Proclamation: 8 September 2016
- Predecessor: Tengku Permaisuri Siti Aishah
- Born: Norashikin binti Abdul Rahman; 4 June 1971 (age 55); Hospital Angkatan Tentera Kem Terendak, Malacca, Malaysia
- Spouses: Mustapha Kamal Halim (m. 1998; div. 2011) Sultan Sharafuddin Idris Shah (m. 2016)
- Issue: Nur Amanda Mustapha Kamal; Adam Salleh Mustapha Kamal
Regnal name
- Tengku Permaisuri Hajah Norashikin
- House: Opu Daeng Chelak (by marriage)
- Father: Abdul Rahman Baba
- Mother: Esah Tahar
- Religion: Sunni Islam
- Occupation: prev.: News anchor; Flight attendant

Tengku Permaisuri Hajah Norashikin (Jawi: تڠكو ڤرمايسوري حاجة نور عشيقين; born Norashikin binti Abdul Rahman; 4 June 1971) is the current Tengku Permaisuri (Queen Consort) of Selangor as the wife of Sultan of Selangor, Sultan Sharafuddin Idris Shah Alhaj.

== Background ==
Norashikin was born on 4 June 1971 at Hospital Angkatan Tentera Kem Terendak, Malacca as the third child of Abdul Rahman Baba, who was an army veteran and a commoner, and Esah Tahar. She received her primary education at Jalan Raja Muda Kampung Baru Primary School, Kuala Lumpur and secondary education at Convent Bukit Nanas Secondary School, Kuala Lumpur. Previously, she had worked as a flight attendant for Malaysia Airlines from 1989 to 1994 before becoming a news anchor with Radio Televisyen Malaysia (RTM) in 1996. She became an award-winning news presenter as she won Best TV News Presenter award twice, during the 2001 and 2004 Seri Angkasa Award (ASA) respectively. She made her final appearance as a news presenter on 31 August 2016, on the evening after the private solemnization ceremony, anchoring the Nasional 8 slot. She had already handed in her resignation letter shortly before her wedding.

From her previous marriage with an Etihad Airways pilot, Mustapha Kamal Halim, she has two children, a daughter and a son, named Nur Amanda and Adam Salleh respectively. Nur Amanda graduated from the University of Bristol, United Kingdom with a Master of Engineering in Mechanical Engineering in 2022. In 2024, Adam Salleh graduated from Swiss Hotel Management School, Switzerland with a Bachelor of Arts in International Hospitality and Event Management.

== Marriage to Sultan of Selangor ==
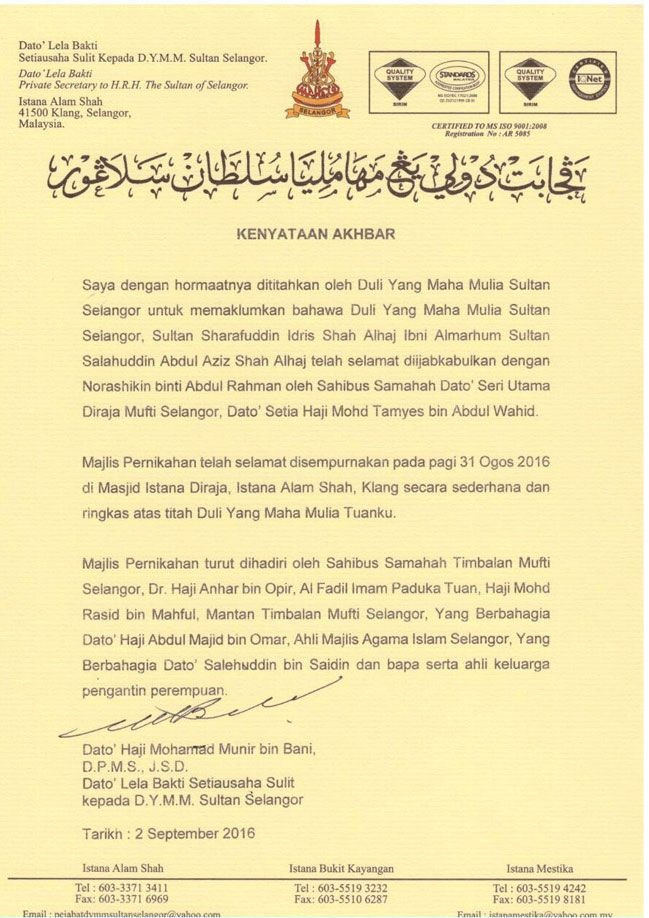
Press release of the marriage

PRESS RELEASE

With all due respect, I am decreed by His Royal Highness (Duli Yang Maha Mulia) The Sultan of Selangor to inform that His Royal Highness (Duli Yang Maha Mulia) The Sultan of Selangor, Sultan Sharafuddin Idris Shah Alhaj ibni Almarhum Sultan Salahuddin Abdul Aziz Shah Alhaj has wedded Norashikin binti Abdul Rahman by His Grace (Sahibus Samahah) The Dato' Seri Utama Diraja Mufti of Selangor, Dato' Setia Haji Mohd Tamyes bin Abdul Wahid.

The solemnization ceremony was conducted on the morning of 31 August 2016 at Masjid Istana Diraja, Istana Alam Shah, Klang with the absence of pomp and pageantry by the decree of His Royal Highness (Duli Yang Maha Mulia).

The ceremony was also attended by His Grace (Sahibus Samahah) The Deputy Mufti, Dr Haji Anhar bin Opir, The Fadil Imam Paduka Tuan, Haji Mohd Rasid bin Mahful, Former Deputy Mufti of Selangor, The Felicitous (Yang Berbahagia) Dato' Haji Abdul Majid bin Omar, Member of the Islamic Religious Council of Selangor, The Felicitous (Yang Berbahagia) Dato' Salehuddin bin Saidin, the father and the family of the bride.

SIGNED Dato' Haji Mohamad Munir bin Bani DPMS JSD The Dato' Lela Bakti, Private Secretary

to HRH The Sultan of Selangor

Norashikin married Sultan Sharafuddin Idris Shah on 31 August 2016 in a private ceremony at Masjid Istana Diraja, Istana Alam Shah, Klang. The couple had discussed beforehand that they wished for the ceremony to be private and intimate, with only close family and friends in attendance. For the sake of secrecy, she drove herself to the mosque without royal escort, while wearing her work clothing and only changed into her wedding outfit there.

They were solemnised by the Mufti of Selangor, Datuk Mohd Tamyes Abd Wahid. Selangor deputy mufti Dr Anhar Opir, Imam Mohd Rasid Mahful and former Selangor deputy mufti Datuk Abdul Majid Omar acted as witnesses of the ceremony. The simple ceremony was also witnessed by close family members of the bride and groom. In the evening, she went back to work and anchored the prime news segment, becoming the first queen consort to do so.

The marriage was announced to the public in the form of press statement and official photographs on 2 September 2016, just before the couple left for their honeymoon to Mauritius. The announcement came out as a shock towards Norashikin former coworkers as they had not known about her relationship with the Sultan prior to the wedding. The then Datin Paduka Seri Norashikin was appointed as Tengku Permaisuri of Selangor on 8 September, a week after their marriage.

== Activities ==
=== Public role and appearances ===
Her first public appearance as Tengku Permaisuri of Selangor is on 12 September 2016 where she and Sharafuddin of Selangor attended Aidiladha prayers with the people at Masjid Diraja Tengku Ampuan Jemaah. She was dressed in a black robe and headscarf.

As queen consort to the Sultan of Selangor, she accompanied her husband in official events. She attended the installation ceremony of Tengku Amir Shah as the Raja Muda (crown prince) of Selangor, which were held in two parts, on 8 October 2016 and 15 October 2016, less than two months since her marriage. She also attended the opening sessions of the Selangor State Legislative Assembly where Sultan Sharafuddin gave his opening speeches.

She attended the Chinese New Year celebration with around 5,000 people, organised by the Selangor State Government subsidiary company on 5 February 2017. In the event held at Pandamaran Sports Centre, Port Klang, she mixed and tossed the ingredients of yusheng together per tradition, along with Sharafuddin and Menteri Besar of Selangor, Azmin Ali. On 5 March 2017, she participated in a 6 kilometres run. It was held in Shah Alam in commemoration with Malaysia Woman Marathon 2017. She attended the installation ceremony of the fifteenth Yang di-Pertuan Agong, Muhammad V of Kelantan at Istana Negara, Jalan Tuanku Abdul Halim on 24 April 2017. On 22 May 2017, she and Sharafuddin made an official visit to Sekinchan, Sabak Bernam. There, she and Sharafuddin visited the paddy gallery, inspected the local industries and had a taste of local delicacies. On 2 July 2017, she attended the Aidilfitri celebration with Sharafuddin at Ampang Jaya, which was attended by around 50,000 people. Norashikin made an appearance during KL Fashion Week 2017 in August 2017 at Pavilion, Kuala Lumpur.

On 6 October 2017, Norashikin made her first official overseas engagement by attending the 50th Anniversary Celebrations of Sultan Hassanal Bolkiah's Accession to the Throne of Brunei alongside Sharafuddin at Istana Nurul Iman, Brunei. In November 2017, Universiti Putra Malaysia named a newly found vanilla orchids species as Vanilla Norashikiniana, after the queen consort. She and Sharafuddin made an official tour to rail transportation facilities in Klang Valley on 16 December 2017. The tour started at Glenmarie LRT station and ended at Bukit Nanas Monorail station. They visited a few selected stations during the tour, which are KL Sentral, Muzium Negara MRT station, Stadium Kajang MRT station and Merdeka MRT station. On 19 December 2017, she attended the opening and naming ceremony of the third Klang bridge which spanned over Klang River between Sungai Udang and Telok Pulai junction, and Jalan Goh Huck Huat junction. The bridge was named Raja Muda Nala Bridge, after Raja Nala, the son of the first Sultan of Selangor, who became the Raja Muda Selangor upon his brother's ascension to the throne.

On 12 February 2018, she made an appearance at Istana Budaya, where she saw the musical theatre adaptation of Ola Bola. On 24 February 2018, she attended the closing ceremony of Selangor State level Tilawah Al-Quran competition, and presented prizes to the winners in women category. She attended the "Art Fair and Charity Sale", a fundraising event hosted by the National Autism Society of Malaysia (NASOM) on 21 April 2018. It was held in commemoration of 2018 National Autism week.

Following the aftermath of 2018 Selangor state election, she witnessed the swearing-in ceremony of Azmin Ali as the returning Menteri Besar of Selangor on 11 May 2018. She also witnessed the subsequent swearing in ceremony of Amirudin Shari as the 16th Menteri Besar of Selangor on 19 June 2018 after Azmin released his position to join the Cabinet of Malaysia as the first Minister of Economic Affairs. On 24 June 2018, she attended the Menteri Besar's Aidilfitri open house event. The event that was held at Dataran Kemerdekaan Shah Alam was attended by around 50,000 people including the Deputy Prime Minister, Wan Azizah Wan Ismail.

On 7 July 2018, she participated in Futbal Fanatix Run, the biggest World Cup running event in Malaysia, which was held at Shah Alam in conjunction with 2018 FIFA World Cup. She participated in 3 km category and released the participants in five and ten kilometres categories.

She made an unofficial trip with close family members and friends to Sekinchan in May 2019 to view the life of the locals up close, as she was enticed by the place from her official visit in 2017. She visited some tourist attractions including the paddy fields, fishing villages and Sky Mirror jetty.

She performed the hajj pilgrimage with her husband Sharafuddin of Selangor in June 2023.

She is the current Pro-chancellor of MARA University of Technology (UiTM), and was proclaimed on 14 June 2022.

She is the first and current chancellor of Universiti Islam Selangor (UIS), and was proclaimed on 19 July 2025.

=== Charities ===
==== Cats welfare ====
Norashikin was known to be a cat lover, having rescued more than 16 cats from streets. She owned more than ten cats, all of which are rescued. She also kept cat and dog foods in her car to feed any stray cats and dogs. Her husband, Sharafuddin built a pavilion at their private residence specifically for feeding stray cats.

On 24 March 2017, she launched the "Stray Free Selangor (SFS) – The Humane and Compassionate Way" campaign through the Selangor Society for the Prevention of Cruelty of Animals (SPCA), of which she is a royal patron. It aimed towards educating the public on humane and compassionate way of treating stray animals, and to replace the ineffective, inhuman, unethical and expensive catch and kill approach of dealing with stray animals. SPCA later introduced subsidies for the neutering cats and dogs services as part of the campaign.

She attended Pet Lovers Fiesta, an event organised by Karlrush Catz Gallery and Malaysia Cat Club to raise awareness on pet care and responsible ownership, on 10 February 2018. She attended the celebration of Selangor's Animal Welfare Day in an event held on 14 July 2018 at Dewan Raja Muda Musa, Shah Alam. On 25 November 2018, she officiated the opening of Selangor Cat Centre in Setia Alam. The stop centre was made to ease cats lovers, owners, veterinarians and volunteers who work in cats welfare, in receiving assistance, advices and informations regarding cats welfare.

She attended the 2019 International Cat Competition which was held Kuala Lumpur on 12 January 2019, where she gave presents to the winners. On 7 August 2019, she launched a cat adoption campaign at Seksyen 14, Shah Alam.

==== Radio Televisyen Malaysia (RTM) ====
Norashikin was appointed as the Royal Patron to Radio Televisyen Malaysia Veterans Association (PVRTM) on 2 April 2018. She attended the Aidilfitri celebration organised by the association on 7 July 2018. On 3 April 2019, she congratulated RTM for their 73rd anniversary in a short video posted on the royal family official instagram account. She extended her hope that RTM will continue to be a respectable and reputable channel to the people. She made a brief appearance on the channel's news programme and anchored the news segment Berita Perdana Khas on 1 April 2021 in conjunction with RTM's 75th anniversary.

== Public image ==
"When I started working at RTM, she showed me the ropes and was very supportive. There were times when I was under stress and made some mistakes, she would always console me and showed me ways to handle the situation."

— Former coworker, Miza Eusni Muhamed, December 2017

Her former coworkers described Norashikin as a kind and polite, yet serious and very disciplined, when working. She also acted as a mentor to younger newscasters. She never looked down upon other coworkers.

Several news outlets, including Selangor Kini, a Selangor-based online newspaper, reported that since her marriage, netizens had flooded the royal family's official Instagram social media account with praises of the natural beauty of Norashikin and her moderate fashion style. While attending the one day tour to LRT, MRT and Monorail in late 2017, she wore a white Ralph Lauren shirt, paired with a pair of blue jeans, a Hermès leather belt and a Longcham clutch. Nona, a Malaysian women's lifestyle magazine, described her fashion style as simple yet classy. The magazine also noted that she often wore baju kurung; her favourite being a local brand Innai Red bespoke, paired with pearl accessories while attending formal functions. They described the outfit choices as minimalistic yet mesmerising.

== Titles, styles and honours ==
Styles of Tengku Permaisuri Norashikin
- Reference style: Her Royal Highness
- Spoken style: Your Royal Highness
- Alternative style: Tuanku

As a Tengku Permaisuri of Selangor, Tengku Permaisuri Norashikin's full style and title in Malay: Duli Yang Maha Mulia Tengku Permaisuri Hajah Norashikin, D.K., S.P.M.S., S.S.I.S., S.P.M.K., Tengku Permaisuri Selangor

in English: Her Royal Highness Tengku Permaisuri Hajah Norashikin, D.K., S.P.M.S., S.S.I.S., S.P.M.K., Tengku Permaisuri of Selangor

- Selangor
  - First Class of the Royal Family Order of Selangor (DK I) (11 December 2016)
  - Knight Grand Commander of the Order of the Crown of Selangor (SPMS) – Datin Paduka Seri (8 September 2016)
  - Knight Grand Companion of the Order of Sultan Sharafuddin Idris Shah (SSIS) – Datin Paduka Setia (3 June 2019)
  - Recipient of the Sultan Sharafuddin Silver Jubilee Medal (25 October 2026)
- Kelantan
  - Knight Grand Commander of the Order of the Crown of Kelantan (SPMK) – Dato' (26 November 2018)

== Places named after her ==
Several places were named after her, including:

- Tengku Permaisuri Norashikin Hospital (formerly known as Kajang Hospital), a specialist hospital located in Kajang, Hulu Langat , Selangor Darul Ehsan.
