= Permaisuri Siti Aishah =

Raja Permaisuri Agong from 1999 to 2001

Siti Aishah سيتي عائشه
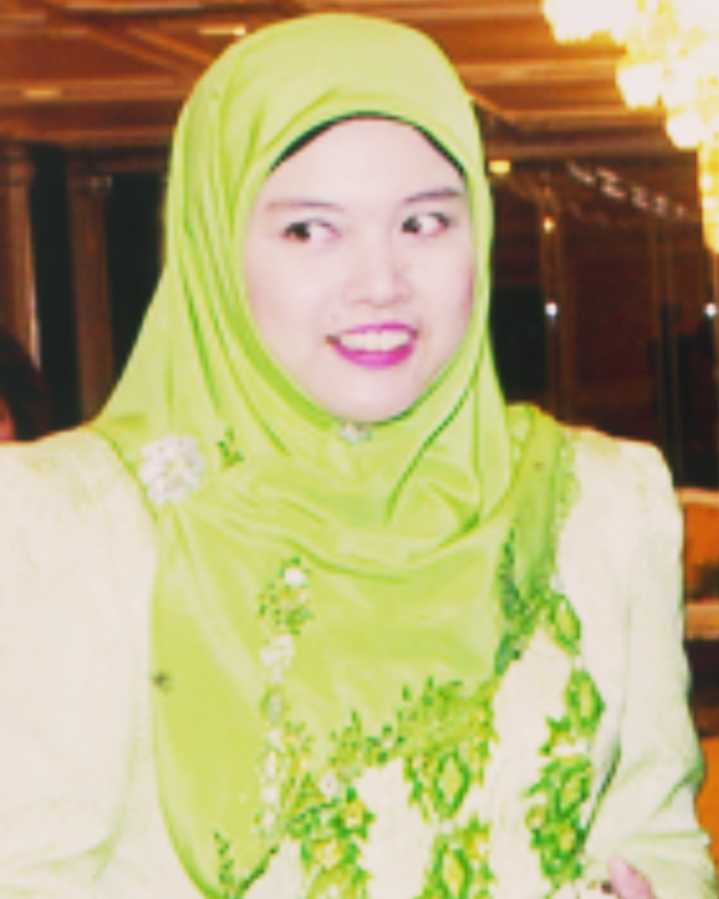
- Siti Aishah in 2001

Queen consort of Malaysia
- Tenure: 26 April 1999 – 21 November 2001
- Installation: 23 September 1999
- Predecessor: Tuanku Najihah
- Successor: Tengku Fauziah

Tengku Permaisuri of Selangor
- Tenure: 24 October 1998 – 21 November 2001
- Installation: 24 October 1998
- Predecessor: Tengku Ampuan Rahimah (as Tengku Ampuan)
- Successor: Tengku Permaisuri Norashikin
- Born: 18 November 1971 (age 54); Kuala Lumpur, Malaysia
- Spouse: Sultan Salahuddin Abdul Aziz Shah (m. 1990; died 2001)
Names
- Siti Aishah binti Abdul Rahman
Regnal name
- Tengku Permaisuri Siti Aishah (as Queen consort); Tuanku Siti Aishah (as Supreme Queen consort); Permaisuri Siti Aishah (as Queen dowager)
- House: Opu Daeng Chelak (by marriage)
- Father: Dato’ Seri Haji Abdul Rahman bin Mohd Yatim
- Mother: Datin Seri Shamshina binti Abdul Rahman
- Religion: Sunni Islam

Permaisuri Siti Aishah (Jawi: ڤرمايسوري سيتي عائشه; born Siti Aishah binti Abdul Rahman; 18 November 1971) is the consort of the 11th Yang di-Pertuan Agong of Malaysia, Sultan Salahuddin Abdul Aziz Shah Al-Haj of Selangor. She was the youngest ever Raja Permaisuri Agong (Queen of Malaysia), ascending the throne at the age of 28 on 26 April 1999.

== Early life ==
She was born on 18 November 1971 and grew up in Kuala Lumpur. She received her early education at the Jalan Gurney Primary School and her secondary education at the Puteri Titiwangsa Secondary School, Kuala Lumpur. She then furthered her studies in banking at the Kelantan branch campus of the Universiti Teknologi MARA (Formerly known as Institut Teknologi Mara) in Kota Bharu, Kelantan.

== Marriage ==
Having married Sultan Salahuddin Abdul Aziz Shah ibni Almarhum Sultan Hisamuddin Alam Shah Al-Haj on 3 May 1990, she was made Che Puan Besar of Selangor. On 24 October 1998, she became Tengku Permaisuri of Selangor with style Her Royal Highness Tengku Permaisuri Siti Aishah, Tengku Permaisuri of Selangor.

The second commoner to become Raja Permaisuri Agong, she is believed to have remarried since the death of her husband the late king on 21 November 2001 – a claim which she has since denied.

== Life after the death of Sultan Salahuddin ==
She came back into the public eye on New Year's Day 2006 for an exclusive interview by The Star Malaysia, where the newspaper had wrongly addressed by her former title, "Tuanku Siti Aishah". The Selangor Council of the Royal Court immediately responded that the widowed consort of the late Sultan of Selangor should instead be properly addressed as Her Highness Permaisuri Siti Aishah. The honorific title Yang Amat Mulia was in recognition of the Darjah Kerabat Yang Amat Dihormati (DK, The Most Honourable Royal Family Order of Selangor), which was conferred on her by her late husband.

In the interview, she talked about her life since the late king (whom she fondly referred to as Almarhum) died, how she coped with his death with her family's love and support, her role as the former queen of Malaysia, her relationship with the late king, and her hope to find love and remarry again, with her parents' blessings.

Permaisuri Siti Aishah was also the patron of the UiTM Alumni, Selangor Women’s Association, Selangor Girl Guides, Jantung Hatiku Society and Girl Guides Association of Malaysia.

== Honours ==
=== Honours of Malaysia ===
- Malaysia
  - Recipient of the Order of the Crown of the Realm (DMN) (1999)
- Selangor
  - First Class of the Royal Family Order of Selangor (DK I) (8.3.1996)
- Sarawak
  - Knight Commander of the Order of the Star of the Hornbill of Sarawak (DA) – Datuk Amar (20.6.1994)

=== Foreign Honours ===
- Thailand
  - Dame Grand Cross of the Order of Chula Chom Klao (1st Class) (27.3.2000)

== See also ==
- Yang Di-Pertuan Agong
- Raja Permaisuri Agong

Malaysian royalty
Preceded by Tunku Najihah (Tunku Ampuan of Negeri Sembilan)	Raja Permaisuri Agong (Queen of Malaysia)	Succeeded by Tengku Fauziah (Raja Perempuan of Perlis)
