= Queen of Malaysia =

Consort of the elected monarch of Malaysia

- Raja Permaisuri Agong راج ڤرمايسوري اݢوڠ
- Royal Standard

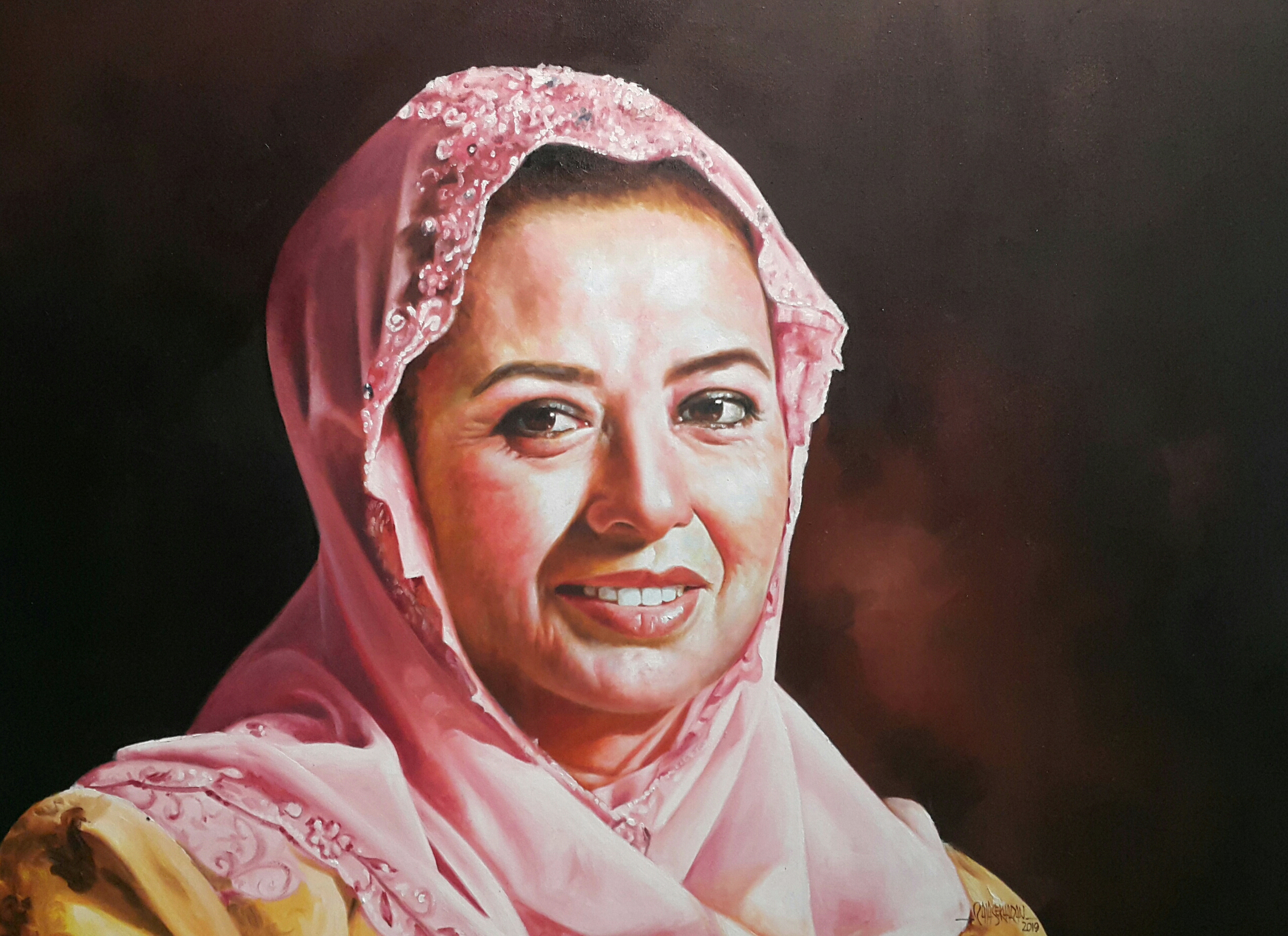
- Incumbent; Raja Zarith Sofiah since 31 January 2024
- Style: Kebawah Duli Yang Maha Mulia Seri Paduka Baginda (Malay); Her Majesty (English)
- Residence: Istana Negara (official); Istana Melawati (secondary)
- Formation: 31 August 1957; 69 years ago
- First holder: Tunku Puan Besar Hajah Kurshiah
- Website: istananegara.gov.my

The Queen of Malaysia, officially Raja Permaisuri Agong (lit. 'supreme queen' Jawi: راج ڤرمايسوري اݢوڠ) is the consort of the Yang di-Pertuan Agong, the elected, constitutional federal monarch of Malaysia.

== Title and precedence ==
Styles of The Queen of Malaysia
- Reference style: Her Majesty
- Spoken style: Your Majesty
- Alternative style: Tuanku

The queen's full style and title in Malay is Kebawah Duli Yang Maha Mulia Seri Paduka Baginda Raja Permaisuri Agong.

- Kebawah Duli Yang Maha Mulia literally means 'Under the dust of the Almighty', referring to how the Raja Permaisuri Agong's power and prestige is dust compared to God's power and the ruler and his consort are always subservient to God.
- Seri Paduka Baginda refers to Seri as in a person. Paduka means victorious and the term Baginda is the Malay possessive pronoun for a royal in the third person.
- Raja Permaisuri Agong in literal English is the "Supreme Queen". It is an archaic equivalent to Raja where the female is a Raja Permaisuri and "Agong" (or Agung in standard Malay) means 'supreme'. The term Agong is not translated, as in the Constitution of Malaysia. The Malay word permaisuri is derived from Sanskrit परमेश्वरी (parameśvarī), 'supreme lady'.

Common English terms used in the media and by the general public include "Supreme Queen" and "Paramount Consort".

In formal English correspondence, for many years the queen was referred to as "Her Majesty The Raja Permaisuri Agong". In January 2024, this was changed to "Her Majesty The Queen of Malaysia".

There are two formal ways of addressing the queen:

- Malay: Tuanku (literally 'My Lady')
- English: Your Majesty

The queen immediately follows her husband, the king, in the Malaysian order of precedence.

== Status, functions, and privileges ==
The king is elected (de facto rotated) every five years from among the nine hereditary rulers of the states of Malaysia by the Conference of Rulers. When a ruler is elected to the office of king, his consort is automatically bestowed the title and dignity of queen and serves the same term of office as her husband. In effect, the holder of the title of Queen of Malaysia changes every five years, though it could happen earlier due to the death or abdication of the king during his term of office.

Like many spouses of heads of state, the queen has no stipulated role in the Constitution of Malaysia. She accompanies the king to official functions and state visits, as well as hosting visiting heads of state and their spouses during their visits to Malaysia. Article 34 of the Malaysian Constitution forbids the queen from holding any appointment, carrying any remuneration, or actively engaging in any commercial enterprise during her tenure. The queen is, however, legally entitled to an annual payment which is included in the Civil List of the king during his term of office.

Previous holders of the title of Queen of Malaysia whose husbands are deceased receive a pension from the Federal Government's Civil List. They also take precedence immediately after the reigning king, the current queen, the reigning monarchs of royal states, and the Yang di-Pertua Negeri (governors) of non-royal states.

== List of queens of Malaysia ==
Number	Portrait	Name	State	Tenure start	Tenure end	Yang di-Pertuan Agong	Birth	Death
1		Tunku Puan Besar Kurshiah	Negeri Sembilan	31 August 1957	1 April 1960	Tuanku Abdul Rahman	16 May 1911	2 Feb 1999
2		Tengku Ampuan Jemaah	Selangor	14 April 1960	1 September 1960	Sultan Hisamuddin Alam Shah	1900	8 Apr 1973
3		Tengku Budriah	Perlis	21 September 1960	20 September 1965	Tuanku Syed Putra	28 Mar 1924	28 Nov 2008
4		Tengku Ampuan Tua Intan Zaharah	Terengganu	21 September 1965	20 September 1970	Sultan Ismail Nasiruddin Shah	13 Apr 1928	24 Jan 2015
5		Sultanah Hajah Bahiyah	Kedah	21 September 1970	20 September 1975	Sultan Abdul Halim Mu'adzam Shah	24 Aug 1930	26 Aug 2003
6		Tengku Zainab	Kelantan	21 September 1975	29 March 1979	Sultan Yahya Petra	7 Aug 1917	10 Jan 1993
7		Tengku Ampuan Hajah Afzan	Pahang	26 April 1979	25 April 1984	Sultan Haji Ahmad Shah Al-Musta'in Billah	4 Dec 1932	29 Jun 1988
8		Sultanah Zanariah	Johor	26 April 1984	25 April 1989	Sultan Iskandar	5 Jul 1940	17 Mar 2019
9		Tuanku Bainun	Perak	26 April 1989	25 April 1994	Sultan Azlan Muhibbuddin Shah	7 Nov 1932	Alive
10		Tunku Ampuan Najihah	Negeri Sembilan	26 April 1994	25 April 1999	Tuanku Ja'afar	1 Sep 1923	8 Sep 2023
11		Tuanku Siti Aishah	Selangor	26 April 1999	21 November 2001	Sultan Salahuddin Abdul Aziz	18 Nov 1971	Alive
12		Tuanku Tengku Fauziah	Perlis	13 December 2001	12 December 2006	Tuanku Syed Sirajuddin	6 Jun 1946	Alive
13		Sultanah Nur Zahirah	Terengganu	13 December 2006	12 December 2011	Sultan Mizan Zainal Abidin	7 Dec 1973	Alive
14		Sultanah Haminah Hamidun	Kedah	13 December 2011	12 December 2016	Sultan Abdul Halim of Kedah (Note: Tuanku Abdul Halim was the first and only Yang di-Pertuan Agong to reign twice. Sultanah Haminah was his second wife from 1975 to his death and reigned alongside him as Raja Permaisuri Agong XIV as Sultanah Bahiyah had died in 2003.)	15 Jul 1953	Alive
		— (Note: Sultan Muhammad V reigned without a queen consort as his wife Sultanah Nur Diana Petra was not proclaimed as Sultanah of Kelantan until 2022. Shortly before his abdication in January 2019, it was reported that Muhammad V had married Oksana Voevodina, however the marriage was not officially acknowledged and Voevodina was not recognized as his consort.)	Kelantan	—		Sultan Muhammad V of Kelantan	—	
15		Tunku Azizah Aminah Maimunah Iskandariah	Pahang	31 January 2019	30 January 2024	Sultan Abdullah of Pahang	5 Aug 1960	Alive
16		Raja Zarith Sofiah	Johor	31 January 2024	Incumbent	Sultan Ibrahim	14 Aug 1959	Alive

== Living former Raja Permaisuri Agong ==
There are currently six living former Raja Permaisuri Agongs; The most recently to die was Tunku Ampuan Najihah (1923–2023), on 8 September 2023.

Name	Portrait	State	Reign	Date of birth	Note
Tuanku Bainun		Perak	26 April 1989 – 25 April 1994	7 November 1932 (age 94)	Former Raja Permaisuri of Perak
Tuanku Siti Aishah		Selangor	26 April 1999 – 21 November 2001	18 November 1971 (age 55)	Former Tengku Permaisuri of Selangor
Tengku Fauziah		Perlis	13 December 2001 – 12 December 2006	6 June 1946 (age 80)	Raja Perempuan of Perlis
Sultanah Nur Zahirah		Terengganu	13 December 2006 – 12 December 2011	7 December 1973 (age 52)	Sultanah of Terengganu
Sultanah Haminah Hamidun		Kedah	13 December 2011 – 12 December 2026	15 July 1953 (age 73)	Former Sultanah of Kedah
Tunku Azizah Aminah Maimunah Iskandariah		Pahang	31 January 2019 – 30 January 2024	5 August 1960 (age 66)	Tengku Ampuan of Pahang

== See also ==
- Elective monarchy
- King of Malaysia — consort's spouse + monarch−ruler of Malaysia.
- Malay styles and titles – on Peninsular Malaysia and Borneo within Brunei + Malaysia.
- Regalia of Malaysia
- Yang di-Pertuan Negara – national Malaysian award for elected monarchs.
