= Salahuddin of Selangor =

King of Malaysia from 1999 to 2001

Salahuddin: صلاح الدين
- Salahuddin in 2001

King of Malaysia
- Reign: 26 April 1999 – 21 November 2001
- Installation: 23 September 1999
- Predecessor: Ja'afar
- Successor: Sirajuddin

Sultan of Selangor
- Reign: 3 September 1960 – 21 November 2001
- Coronation: 28 June 1961
- Predecessor: Hisamuddin
- Successor: Sharafuddin
- Born: 8 March 1926; Istana Bandar Temasha, Selangor, Federated Malay States
- Died: 21 November 2001 (aged 75); Gleneagles Hospital Kuala Lumpur, Malaysia
- Burial: 22 November 2001; Royal Mausoleum, Klang, Selangor, Malaysia
- Spouse: Raja Nur Saidatul-Ihsan, Paduka Bonda Raja (m. 1943; div. 1955) Che' Mahiran (div. 1953) Tengku Ampuan Rahimah (m. 1955; died 1993) Sharifa Salmah (m. 1961; div. 1963) Permaisuri Siti Aishah (m. 1990)
- Issue: Tengku Nor Halija; Tengku Idris Shah; Tengku Puteri Sofiah; Tengku Sulaiman Shah; Tengku Puteri Zahariah; Tengku Fatimah; Tengku Abdul Samad; Tengku Puteri Arafiah; Tengku Puteri Aishah; Tengku Ahmad Shah; Tengku Puteri Nor Marina; Tengku Puteri Nor Zehan
Names
- Tengku Abdul Aziz Shah ibni Tengku Alam Shah
Regnal name
- Sultan Salahuddin Abdul Aziz Shah Alhaj ibni Almarhum Sultan Hisamuddin Alam Shah Alhaj
- House: Opu Daeng Chelak
- Father: Sultan Hisamuddin Alam Shah Alhaj Ibni Almarhum Sultan Alaeddin Sulaiman Shah
- Mother: Tengku Ampuan Jemaah Binti Almarhum Raja Ahmad
- Religion: Sunni Islam

Salahuddin Abdul Aziz Shah Alhaj ibni Almarhum Sultan Hisamuddin Alam Shah Alhaj (Jawi: سلطان صلاح الدين عبدالعزيز شاه الحاج إبن المرحوم سلطان حسام الدين عالم شاه الحاج; 8 March 1926 – 21 November 2001) was the Sultan of Selangor from 1960, and the eleventh king of Malaysia from 1999, until his death in 2001.

== Early life ==
Tengku Abdul Aziz Shah was born on 8 March 1926 at the Istana Bandar Temasha, Jugra, Kuala Langat. He was the eldest son of Sultan Hisamuddin of Selangor by his royal consort, Tengku Ampuan Jemaah.

He received his early education at the Pengkalan Batu Malay School in Klang in 1934. In 1936, he furthered his studies at the Malay College Kuala Kangsar until 1941 when World War II began. After World War II, he went to England in 1947 and studied at the School of Oriental and African Studies, University of London for two years.

Upon his return from the United Kingdom, he served with the Civil Service Department as a trainee officer with the Selangor Survey Department. He later served as an Inspector of Schools for eight years.

In 1952, he attended a short-term course at the Malay Military Troop in Port Dickson for six months and was commissioned with the Queen Commission in the rank of captain. Thereafter, he was promoted to the rank of major.

== Sultan of Selangor ==
Tengku Abdul Aziz Shah was appointed as the Tengku Laksamana of Selangor on 1 August 1946 and as the Raja Muda (crown prince) of Selangor on 13 May 1950.

On the death of his father, Sultan Hisamuddin of Selangor, Tengku Abdul Aziz Shah became the eighth Sultan of Selangor with the title Sultan Salahuddin Abdul Aziz Shah on 3 September 1960 and was installed as sultan on 28 June 1961.

On 26 April 1984, Sultan Salahuddin was appointed as Commodore-in-Chief of the Royal Malaysian Navy by the Malaysian Armed Forces in place of the position of Colonel-in-Chief of the Royal Malaysian Air Force which he held since 1966.

Sultan Salahuddin signed the cession of Kuala Lumpur from Selangor to the Federal Government to form a Federal Territory on 1 February 1974. The Sultan cried after the signing as he was very fond and proud of the city. The Kota Darul Ehsan arch was erected along the Federal Highway at the border of Kuala Lumpur and Selangor to commemorate the event in 1981.

Sultan Salahuddin founded Shah Alam as Selangor's new state capital in 1978. He said that for Selangor to become a modern state, it would need a new state capital as Kuala Lumpur had become a Federal Territory. Klang was the state capital between the cession of Kuala Lumpur and the creation of Shah Alam. Many buildings and roads in Shah Alam are named after him.

Salahuddin held the rank of Marshal of the Royal Malaysian Air Force, Field Marshal of the Malaysian Army and Admiral of the Fleet of the Royal Malaysian Navy as per constitutional provisions making him as the second royal military officer to become supreme commander-in-chief of the armed forces.

== Yang di-Pertuan Agong ==
Sultan Salahuddin was elected as the eleventh Yang di-Pertuan Agong on 26 April 1999 and installed on 11 September 1999. He was the second oldest ruler to be elected to the position.

The cession of Putrajaya, from Selangor to the Federal Government in 2001 to become a Federal Territory occurred during his reign as Yang di-Pertuan Agong. The Persiaran Sultan Salahuddin Abdul Aziz Shah in Putrajaya was named after him.

He died in office on 21 November 2001, at the Gleneagles Intan Medical Centre in Kuala Lumpur after reigning for two years and 6 months. He underwent a heart operation to put a pacemaker two months prior to his death, which he did not fully recover from. Prime Minister Mahathir Mohamad had visited him four times before.

He was buried in the Royal Mausoleum near Sultan Sulaiman Mosque in Klang. Mahathir expressed grief over Salahuddin's death. The Prime Minister's official residence in Putrajaya was closed to the public for two days.

== Personal life ==
Sultan Salahuddin Abdul Aziz Shah had at least four wives.

His first wife and cousin, Paduka Bonda Raja Raja Nur Saidatul Ihsan binti Al Marhum Raja Bendahara Tengku Badar Shah, whom he later divorced, bore:

1. Tengku Nor Halija
2. Tengku Idris Shah, later Sultan Sharafuddin Idris Shah
3. Tengku Puteri Sofiah (died 8 June 2017)
4. Tengku Laksamana Tengku Sulaiman Shah
5. Tengku Puteri Zahariah (Ku Yah)
6. Tengku Fatimah
7. Tengku Panglima Besar Tengku Abdul Samad
8. Tengku Puteri Arafiah (died 26 June 2026)
9. Tengku Puteri Aishah (died 30 July 2012)

Che Maheram binti Muhammad Rais, his second wife, bore him:

1. Tengku Panglima Raja Tengku Ahmad Shah

His royal consort, Tengku Ampuan Rahimah binti Sultan Abdul Aziz Shah of the Langkat royal family in Sumatra died in 1993 before his election as Yang di-Pertuan Agong. She was the mother of:

1. Tengku Puteri Nor Marina
2. Tengku Puteri Nor Zehan

His last wife, Tuanku Siti Aishah binti Abdul Rahman, who was a commoner, served as his Raja Permaisuri Agong. Being fifty years younger than him, she was also the youngest ever occupant of that office – only 29 at her succession to the throne.

== Hobbies and interests ==
Sultan Salahuddin Abdul Aziz Shah was a keen sportsman. His interest in golf is well-known within and outside the country. The Sultan also loved sailing, collecting antique cars, rearing animals and planting orchids. He also likes visiting foreign countries to widen his knowledge and experience.

== Legacy ==
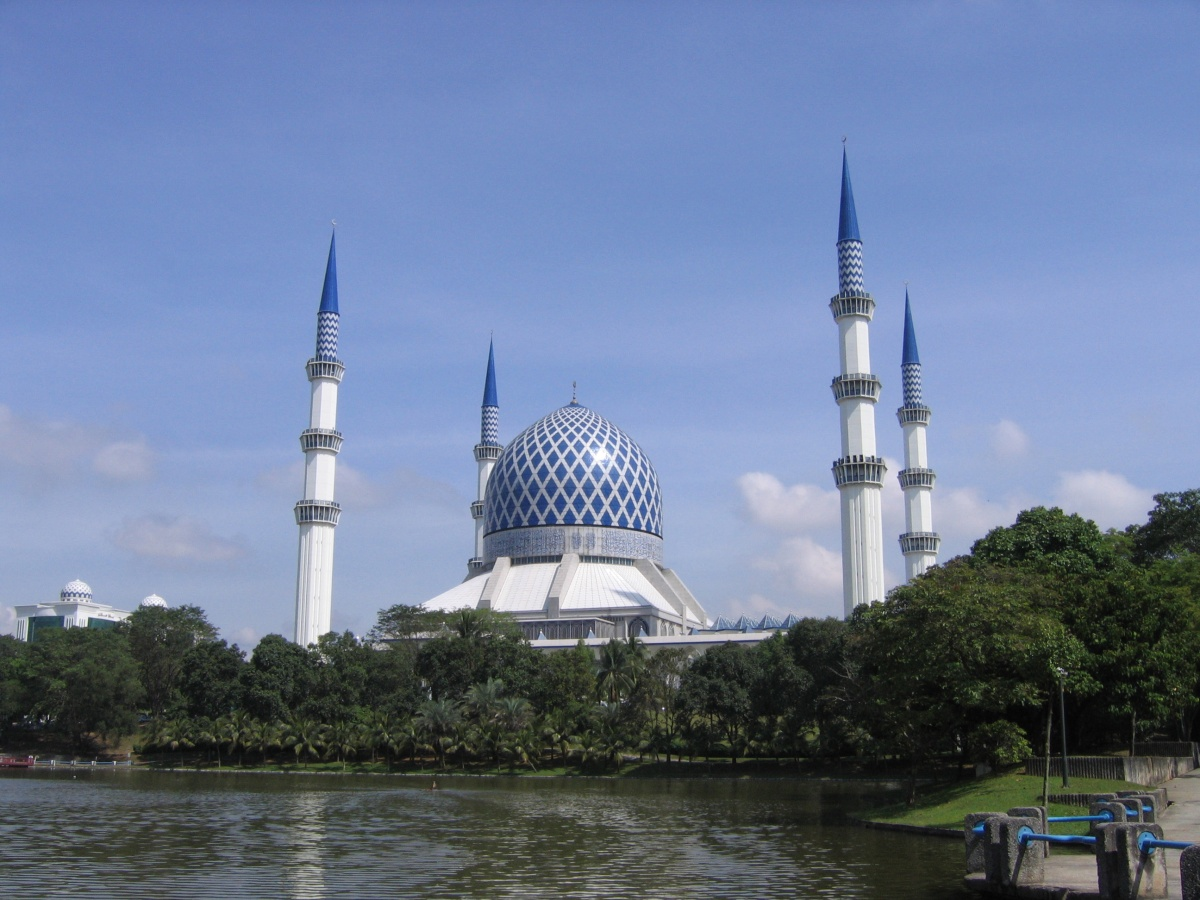
Sultan Salahuddin Abdul Aziz Mosque in Shah Alam.

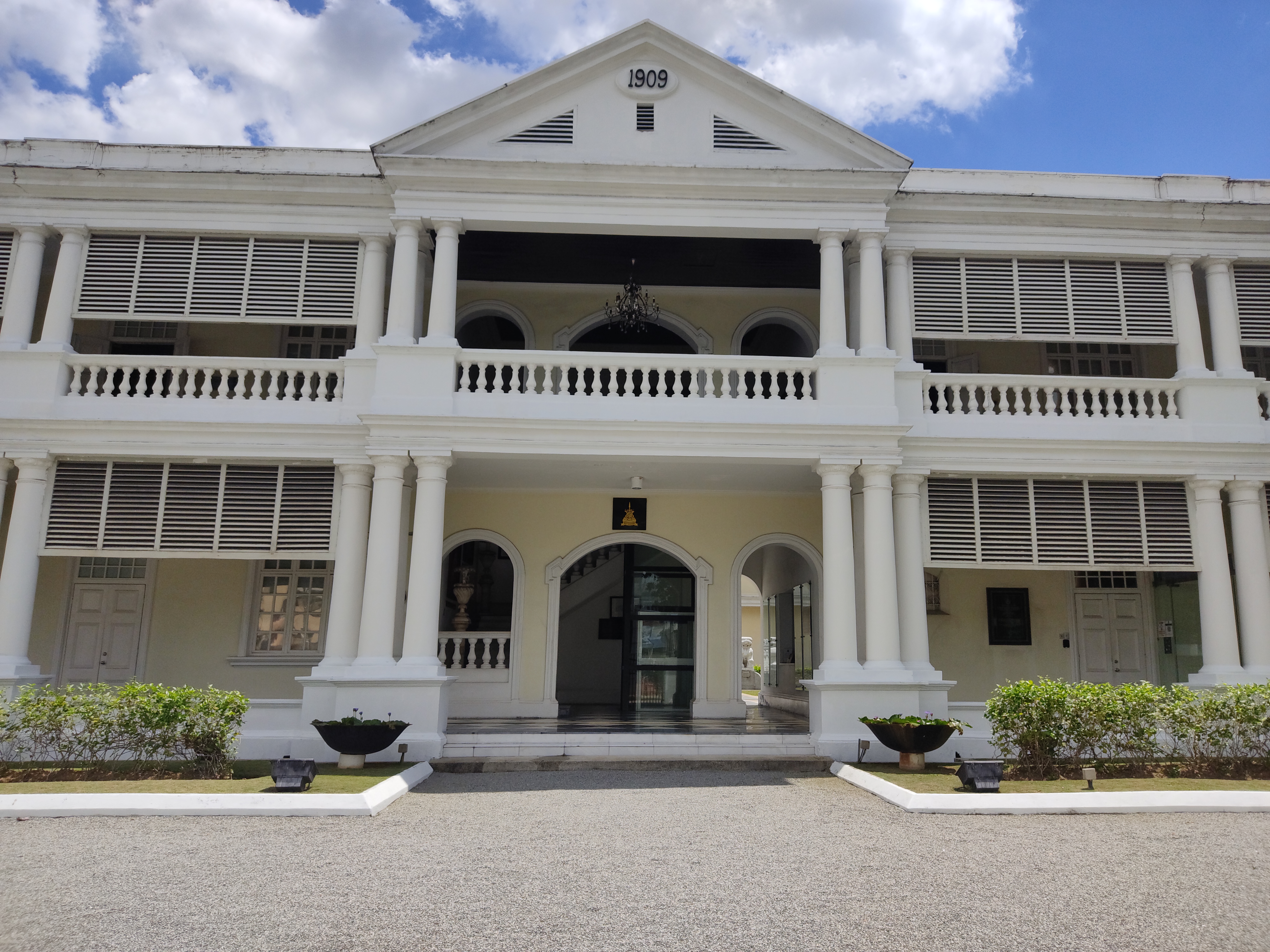
Sultan Abdul Aziz Royal Gallery in Klang.

Several projects and institutions were named after the Sultan, including:

=== Educational institutions ===
- SMK Sultan Salahuddin Abdul Aziz Shah, a secondary school in Shah Alam, Selangor
- SMK Sultan Abdul Aziz Shah, a secondary school in Kajang, Selangor
- SAMT Sultan Salahuddin Abdul Aziz Shah, a secondary school in Sabak Bernam, Selangor
- Politeknik Sultan Salahuddin Abdul Aziz Shah in Shah Alam, Selangor

=== Buildings ===
- Sultan Salahuddin Abdul Aziz Shah Building, Selangor's state secretariat building in Shah Alam, Selangor
- Sultan Salahuddin Abdul Aziz Shah Mosque, Selangor's state mosque in Shah Alam, Selangor
- Sultan Salahuddin Abdul Aziz Shah Court Building, a court building in Shah Alam, Selangor
- Sultan Abdul Aziz Shah Jamek Mosque, a mosque in Petaling Jaya, Selangor
- Sultan Abdul Aziz Shah Airport, an airport in Subang, Selangor
- KD Sultan Abdul Aziz Shah, a TLDM naval base in Pulau Indah, Klang, Selangor
- Sultan Salahuddin Abdul Aziz Power Station, a power station in Kapar, Selangor
- Sultan Salahuddin Abdul Aziz Shah Arts and Cultural Centre at Universiti Putra Malaysia (UPM) in Serdang, Selangor
- Menara Sultan Abdul Aziz Shah, formerly known as, Menara Ilmu since 1970s, an administerative building at Universiti Teknologi MARA, Shah Alam, Selangor.
- Sultan Abdul Aziz Shah Hospital, a hospital at UPM, Serdang, Selangor
- Tengku Abdul Aziz Shah Jamek Mosque, a mosque in Kampung Sungai Penchala, Kuala Lumpur

=== Roads and bridges ===
- Persiaran Sultan Salahuddin Abdul Aziz Shah, a main thoroughfare in Putrajaya
- Jalan Sultan Salahuddin and Persiaran Sultan Salahuddin, a major road in Kuala Lumpur
- Jalan Raja Muda Abdul Aziz, a major road in Kuala Lumpur
- Sultan Salahuddin Abdul Aziz Shah Bridge, a bridge in Kuala Selangor

=== Others ===
- Sultan Abdul Aziz Shah Golf and Country Club (KGSAAS), a major golf club in Shah Alam, Selangor
- Sultan Abdul Aziz Royal Gallery, a royal gallery located in Klang, Selangor

== Honours ==
Styles of Salahuddin
- Reference style: His Royal Highness
- Spoken style: Your Royal Highness

Salahuddin's full style and title was: Duli Yang Maha Mulia Sultan Salahuddin Abdul Aziz Shah Alhaj ibni Almarhum Sultan Hisamuddin Alam Shah Alhaj, Sultan dan Yang di-Pertuan Selangor Darul Ehsan Serta Segala Daerah Takluknya.

=== Honours of Selangor ===
- Grand Master of the Royal Family Order of Selangor (since 6 June 1961)
- Grand Master of the Order of the Crown of Selangor (since 6 June 1961)
- Grand Master of the Order of Sultan Salahuddin Abdul Aziz Shah (since 30 September 1985)
- Meritorious Service Medal

=== Honours of Malaysia ===
- Malaysia (as Yang di-Pertuan Agong from 26 April 1999 to 21 November 2001)
  - Grand Master and recipient of the Order of the Royal House of Malaysia (26 April 1999 – 21 November 2001)
  - Grand Master and recipient of the Order of the Crown of the Realm (28 August 1961) (26 April 1999 – 21 November 2001)
  - Grand Master of the Order of the Defender of the Realm (26 April 1999 – 21 November 2001)
  - Grand Master of the Order of Loyalty to the Crown of Malaysia (26 April 1999 – 21 November 2001)
  - Grand Master of the Order of Merit of Malaysia (26 April 1999 – 21 November 2001)
  - Grand Master of the Order for Important Services (Malaysia) (26 April 1999 – 21 November 2001)
  - Grand Master of the Order of the Royal Household of Malaysia (26 April 1999 – 21 November 2001)
- Pahang
  - Member 1st class of the Family Order of the Crown of Indra of Pahang (DK I) (14 July 1987)
- Johor
  - First Class of the Royal Family Order of Johor (DK I) (1975)
- Kedah
  - Member of the Royal Family Order of Kedah (DK)
- Kelantan
  - Recipient of the Royal Family Order (DK) (10 July 1966)
- Negeri Sembilan
  - Member of the Royal Family Order of Negeri Sembilan (DKNS)
- Perak
  - Recipient of the Royal Family Order of Perak (DK) – currently: (19 April 1986)
- Perlis
  - Recipient of the Perlis Family Order of the Gallant Prince Syed Putra Jamalullail (DK) (1970)
- Terengganu
  - Member first class of the Family Order of Terengganu (DK I) (21 June 1964)
- Sabah
  - Grand Commander of the Order of Kinabalu (SPDK) – Datuk Seri Panglima
- Sarawak
  - Knight Grand Commander of the Order of the Star of Hornbill Sarawak (DP) – Datuk Patinggi (29 April 1976)
- Malacca
  - Grand Commander of the Premier and Exalted Order of Malacca (DUNM) – Datuk Seri Utama (30 July 1989)

=== Foreign honours ===
- Brunei
  - Recipient of the Royal Family Order of the Crown of Brunei (DKMB) (28 June 1961)
- Bahrain
  - Al Khalifah Medal Decoration (28 October 2000)
- Colombia
  - Grand Collar of the Order of Boyaca
- Thailand
  - Knight of the Order of the Rajamitrabhorn (2001)

Regnal titles
Preceded by Tuanku Jaafar (Yang di-Pertuan Besar of Negeri Sembilan)	Yang di-Pertuan Agong (King of Malaysia); 1999–2001	Succeeded by Tuanku Syed Sirajuddin (Raja of Perlis)
Preceded by Sultan Hisamuddin Alam Shah	Sultan of Selangor; 1960–2001	Succeeded by Sultan Sharafuddin Idris Shah
