= Sultan Salahuddin Abdul Aziz Mosque =

Mosque in Shah Alam, Selangor, Malaysia

- Masjid Sultan Salahuddin Abdul Aziz مسجد سلطان صلاح الدين عبدالعزيز
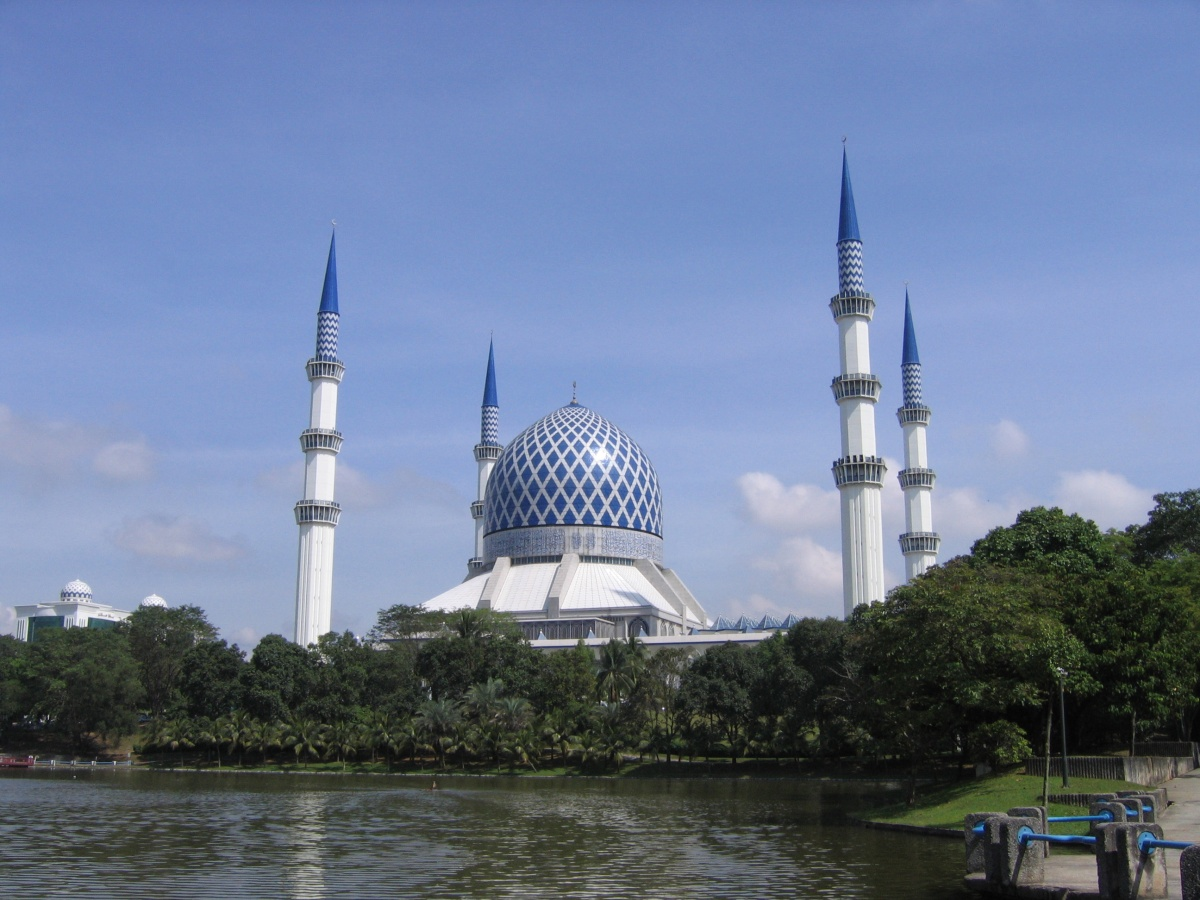
- Sultan Salahuddin Abdul Aziz Mosque from Taman Tasik Shah Alam.

- Location within Malaysia

Religion
- Affiliation: Islam
- Branch/tradition: Shafi`i Sunni

Location
- Location: Shah Alam, Selangor, Malaysia
- Coordinates: 3.078°N 101.521°E

Architecture
- Architect: Dato Baharuddin Abu Kassim
- Type: Mosque
- Style: Islamic, Malay
- Completed: 1988

Specifications
- Capacity: 24,000
- Dome height (outer): 106.7 m (350 ft)
- Dome dia. (outer): 51.2 m (168 ft)
- Minaret: 4
- Minaret height: 142.3 m (467 ft)
- Materials: Concrete, steel, aluminium, vitreous enamel coated steel panelling, timber, glass, ceramic tile

The Sultan Salahuddin Abdul Aziz Shah Mosque (Malay: Masjid Sultan Salahuddin Abdul Aziz) is the state mosque of Selangor, Malaysia. It is located in Shah Alam and is the country's largest mosque and also the second largest mosque in Southeast Asia by capacity. Its most distinguishing feature is its large blue and silver dome. The mosque has four minarets, one erected at each of the corners.

== History ==
The mosque was commissioned by the late Sultan Salahuddin Abdul Aziz, when he declared Shah Alam as the new capital of Selangor on 14 February 1974. Construction began in 1982 and finished on 11 March 1988. The mosque is also known locally as the Blue Mosque owing to its blue dome.

== Records ==
The mosque has the distinction of having one of the largest religious dome in the world, measuring 51.2 m (168 ft) in diameter and reaching 106.7 m (350 ft) above ground level. The four minarets, each reaching 142.3 m (467 ft) above ground level, are the third tallest in the world, after those at the Hassan II Mosque in Casablanca, Morocco, and the Djamaa el Djazaïr in Algiers, Algeria. In its early years, the mosque was listed in the Guinness Book of Records as having the tallest minaret in the world before being supplanted by the 210 m (690 ft) minaret at the Hassan II Mosque in August 1993. However, the mosque still maintains the distinction of having the world's tallest group of minarets.

== Architecture and features ==
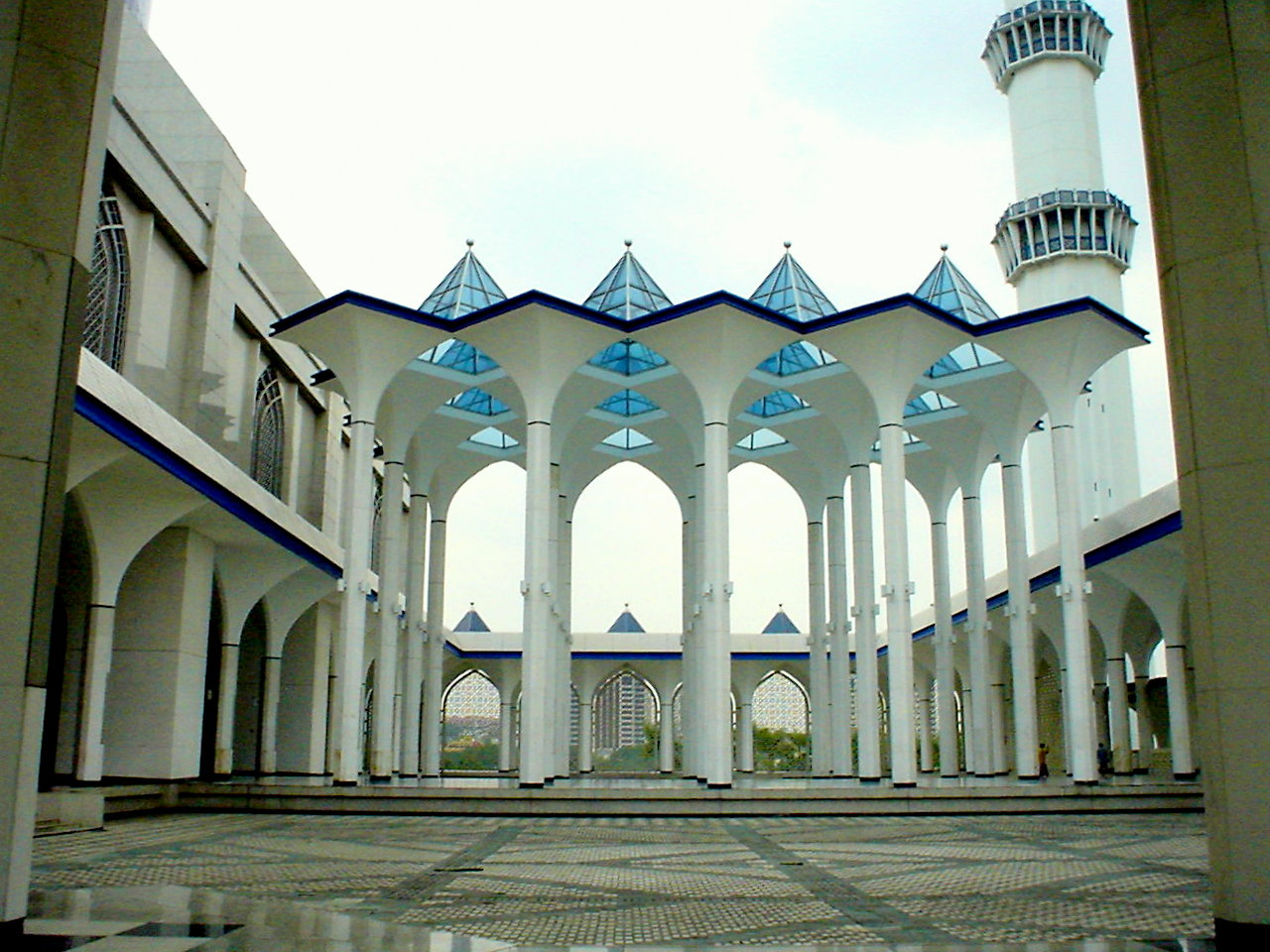
At the hallway (first floor) of the mosque.

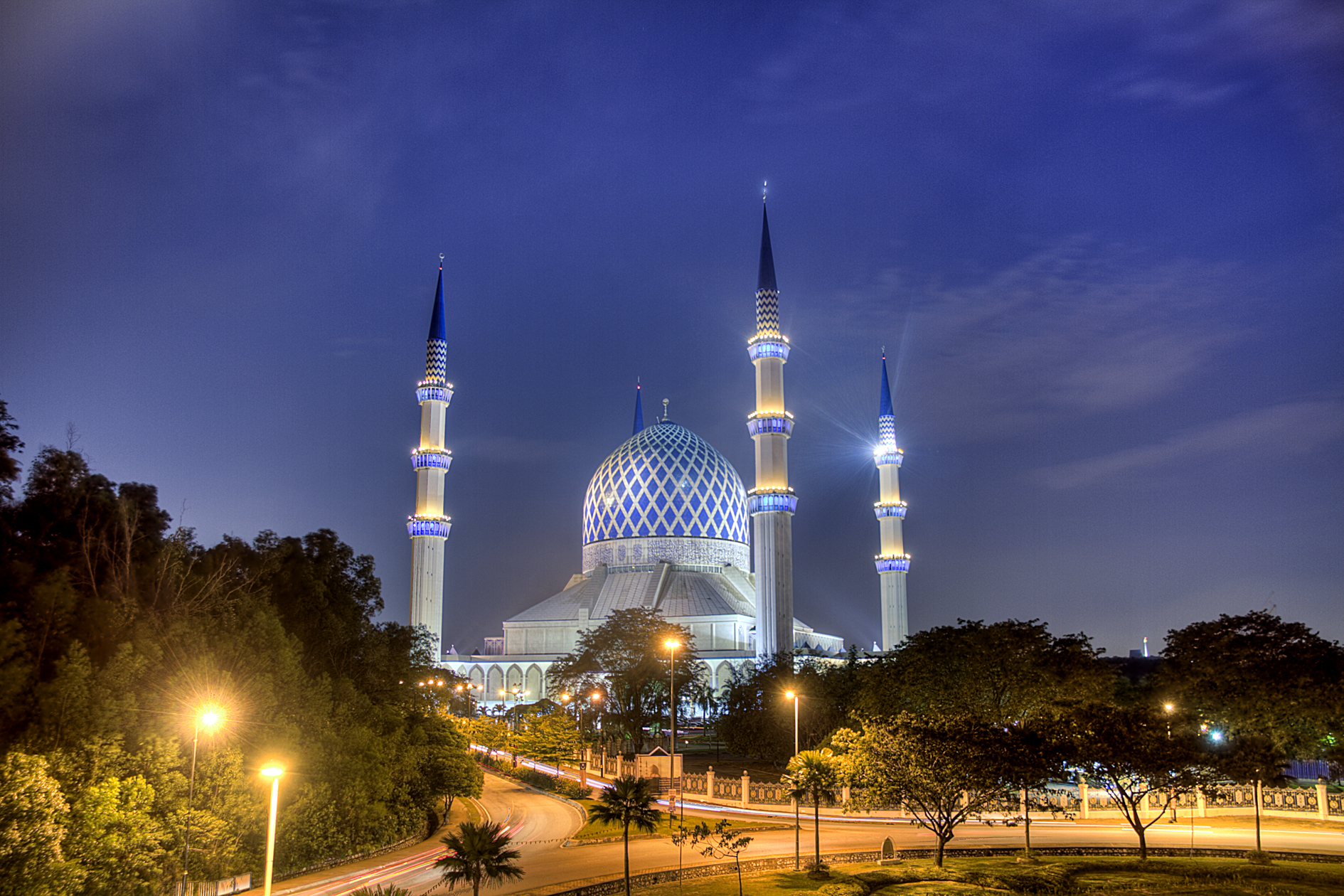
The blue mosque at night

The design of the Sultan Salahuddin Abdul Aziz Shah Mosque is a combination of Malay and Modernist styles, and elements of Malay and Islamic architecture are incorporated into the finishes of the building. Fine decorative khat (Arabic calligraphy) can be seen on the inner curve of the dome and parts of the walls. The calligraphy work was executed by the Egyptian calligrapher Shiekh Abdel Moneim Mohamed Ali El Sharkawi. Intricate aluminium grills are found on the doorways, windows, and walls of the mosque. The windows are fitted with blue stained glass to reduce the amount of light entering the hall. The resulting filtered illumination lends a bluish ambiance to the interior spaces, evoking a sense of peace and serenity. The high ceiling has triangular panels of red balau and ramin timber wood that are set in a crisscrossing pattern. The dome is constructed of aluminium and the outer surface is clad with vitreous enamel-baked triangular steel panels decorated with a rosette of verses from the Qur'an.

The main prayer hall spans two levels, is fully carpeted and air conditioned, and is one of the largest such spaces in the world. The upper gallery of the prayer hall is reserved for female worshippers, and the ground floor contains the reception area, administrative offices, conference rooms, a library, and lecture rooms. The mosque has the capacity to accommodate 12,600 worshippers and is large enough that on a clear day it can be seen from some vantage points in Kuala Lumpur.

The mosque overlooks the Garden of Islamic Arts, a landscaped park inspired by the Quranic Garden of Paradise (Jannah, Arabic: جنّة). These 14 hectares of spiritual sanctuary house nine galleries exhibiting a rich array of Islamic arts such as calligraphy, sculptures, paintings, and architecture. The site is occasionally used for traditional Islamic performances.

The design of this mosque was later adapted to the Jami Al-Azhar Jakapermai Mosque in Kalimalang, Bekasi, Indonesia.

== See also ==
- Islam in Malaysia
- List of tallest domes
