= Tengku Permaisuri of Selangor =

Queen consorts to the Sultan of Selangor that are not of royal blood

- State

Incumbent
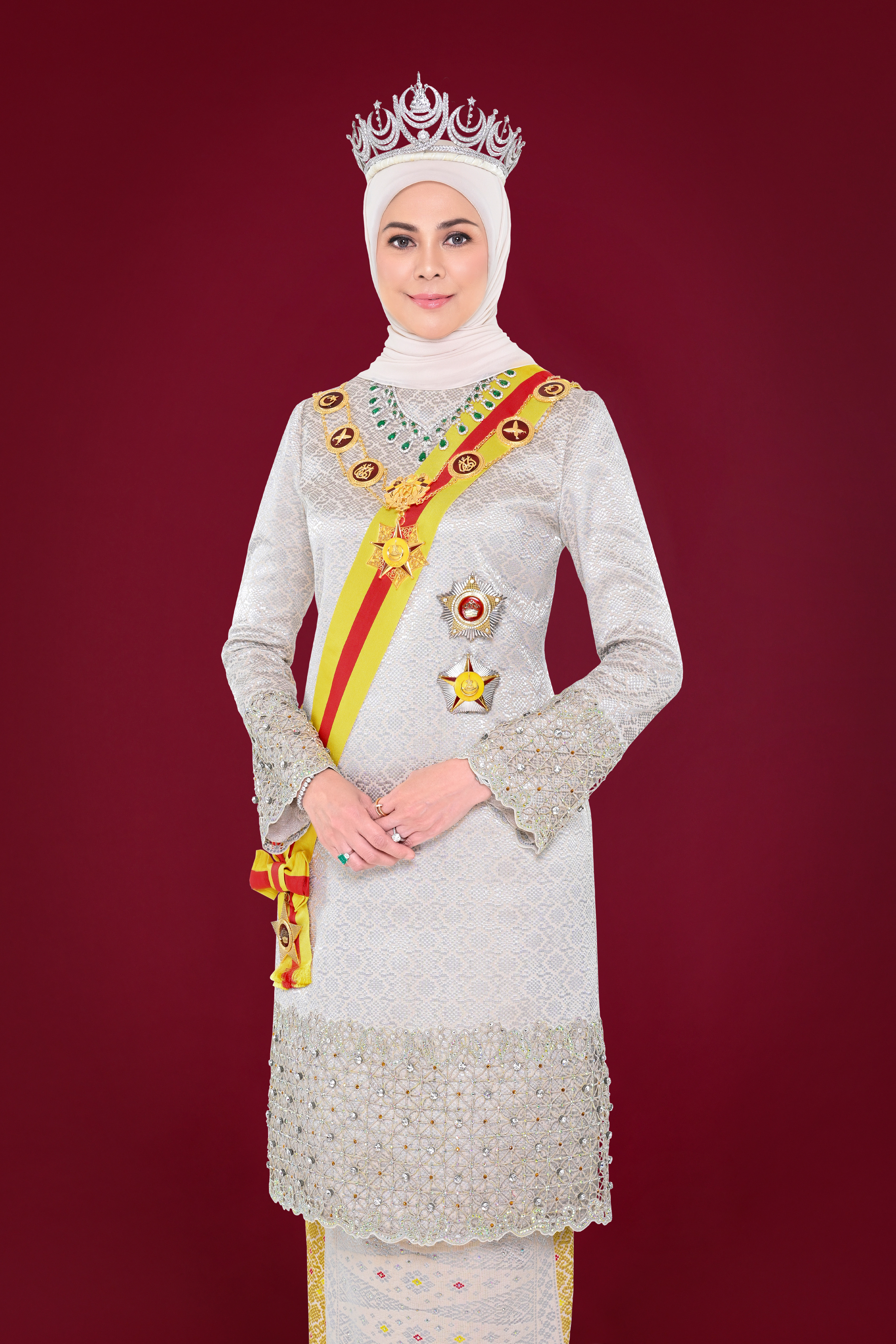
- Tengku Permaisuri Hajah Norashikin since 8 September 2016

Details
- Style: Her Royal Highness
- Formed: 1942; 84 years ago
- Residences: Istana Alam Shah, Klang

The Tengku Permaisuri of Selangor is the title given to the royal consort of the Sultan of Selangor that are not of royal blood.

== Status ==
According to the Laws of the Constitution of Selangor 1959, the consort of the Sultan that are not of royal blood may be given the title Tengku Permaisuri of Selangor if she fulfilled certain criteria. She must be legally wedded wife of the Sultan in accordance with Muslim religion, a Malay and professed the Muslim religion.

She is entitled to an amount of allowance that are determined by the Selangor State Legislative Assembly, which will be charged under the Consolidated Fund.

== List of Tengku Permaisuri of Selangor ==
No.	Image	Regnal name	Born name	Reign	Sultan	Ref
1		Tengku Permaisuri Sharifah Mastura	Sharifah Mastura binti Tengku Suri Syed Ahmad Shahabuddin	15 January 1942 – 14 September 1945	Musa Ghiatuddin Riayat Shah of Selangor	
2		Tengku Permaisuri Siti Aishah	Siti Aishah binti Abdul Rahman	24 October 1998 – 21 November 2001	Salahuddin of Selangor	
3		Tengku Permaisuri Hajah Norashikin	Norashikin binti Abd Rahman	8 September 2016 – present	Sharafuddin of Selangor	

== Title and style ==
The style used by the reigning consort is Duli Yang Maha Mulia or its English equivalent, Her Royal Highness.

For example, the full style and title of the reigning Tengku Permaisuri is "Duli Yang Maha Mulia Tengku Permaisuri Hajah Norashikin, Tengku Permaisuri Selangor" or in English; "Her Royal Highness Tengku Permaisuri Hajah Norashikin, Tengku Permaisuri of Selangor".
