= 1985 in Malaysia =

- Decades: 1960s; 1970s; 1980s; 1990s; 2000s
- See also: Other events of 1985; History of Malaysia • Timeline • Years

This article lists important figures and events in Malaysian public affairs during the year 1985, together with births and deaths of notable Malaysians.

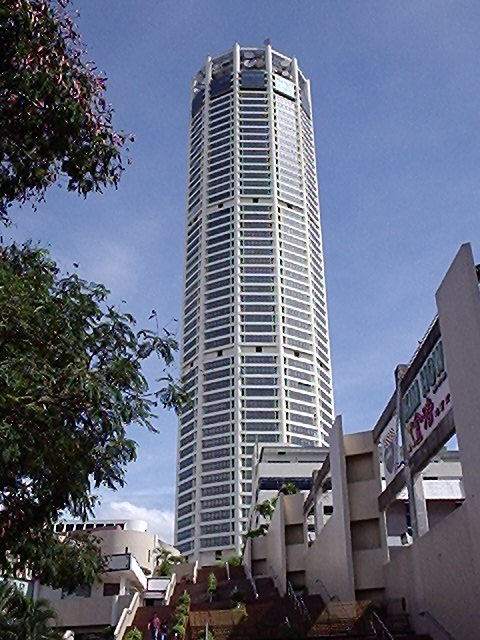
KOMTAR building, Penang.

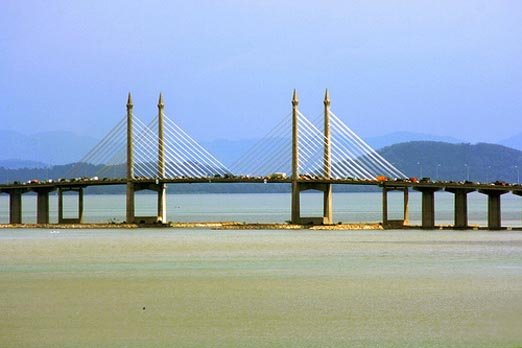
Penang Bridge

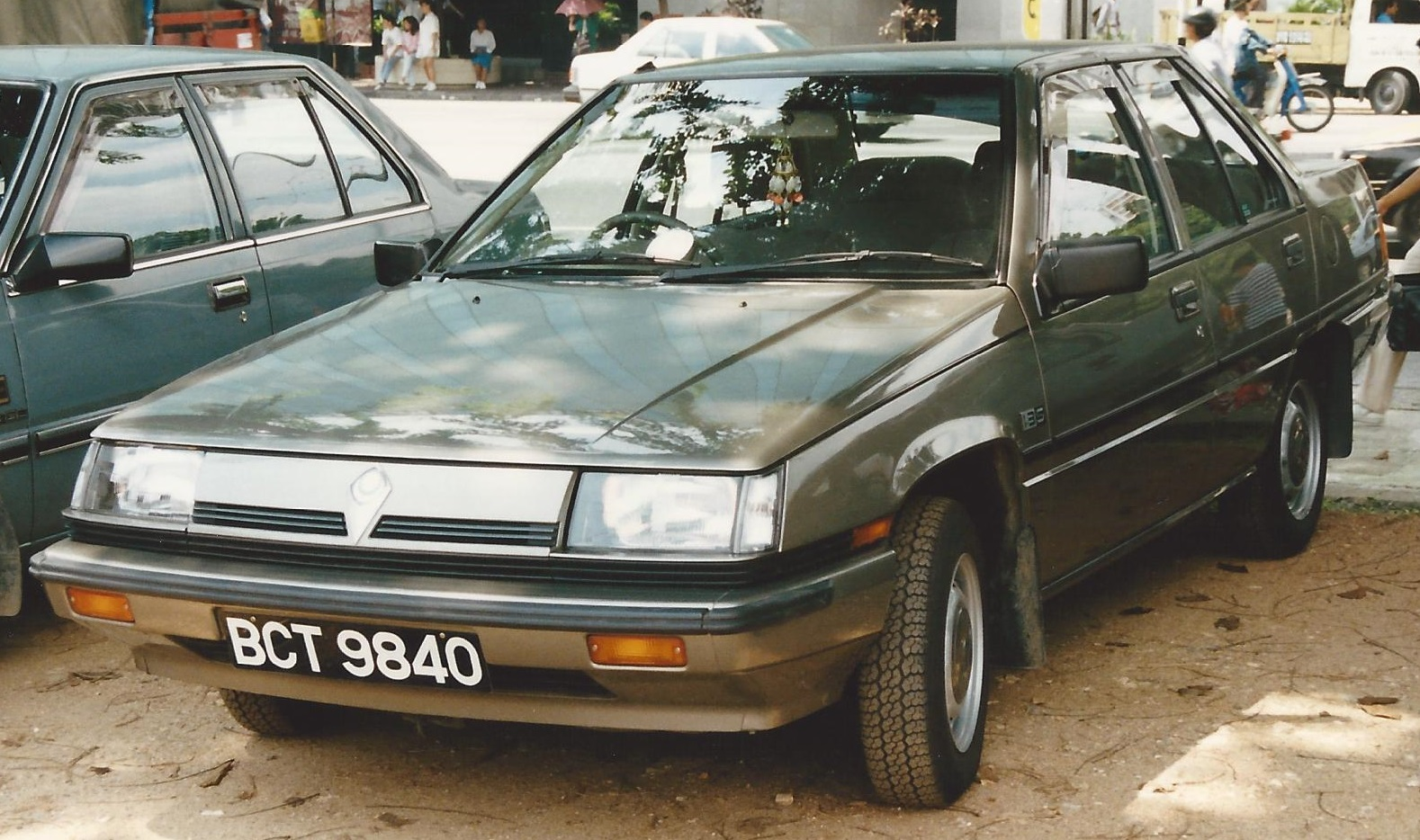
Proton Saga, the first national car

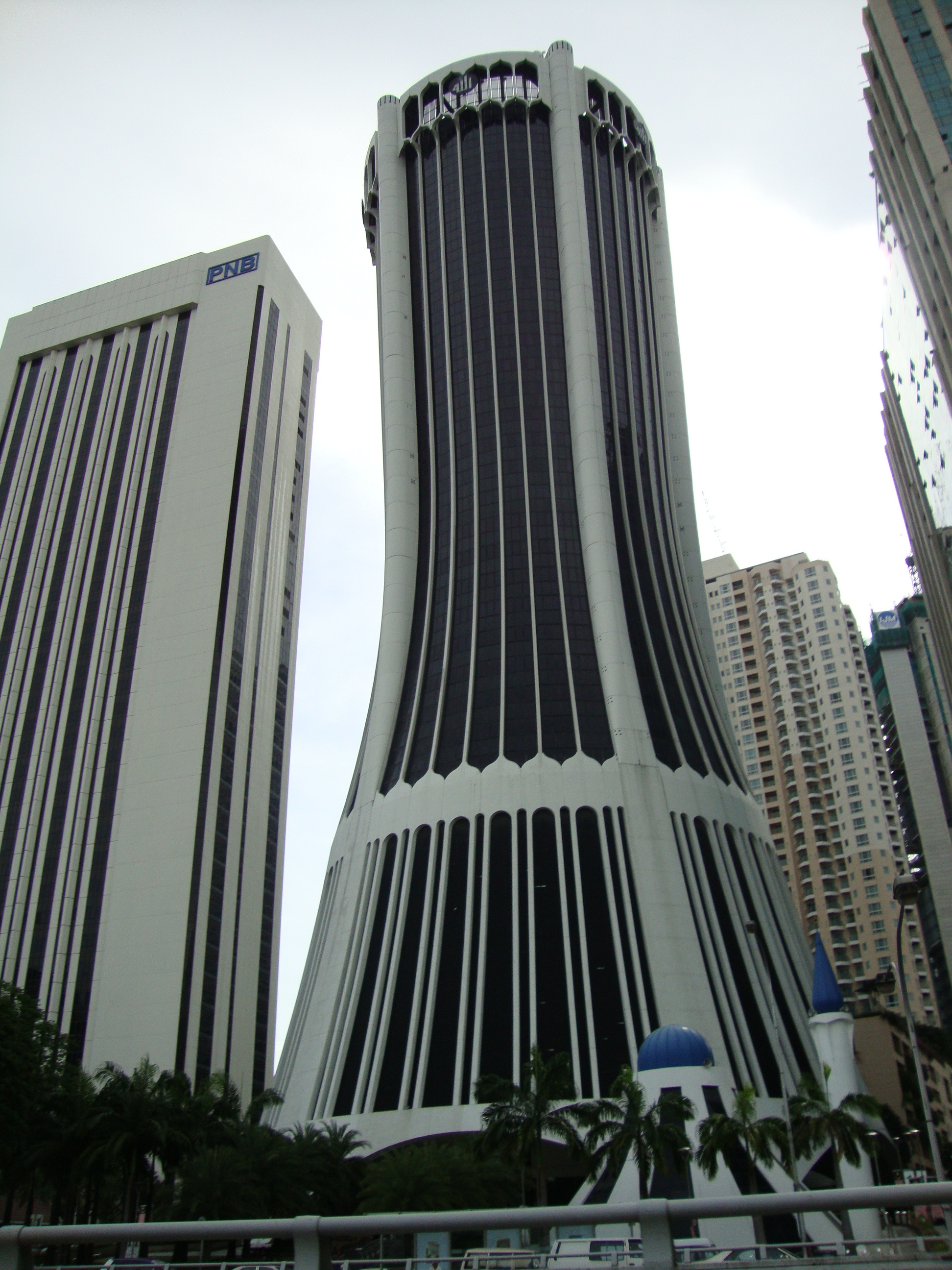
The main headquarters of Tabung Haji (the Malaysian hajj pilgrims fund board) in Kuala Lumpur, Malaysia opened on 8 July 1985.

== Incumbent political figures ==
=== Federal level ===
- Yang di-Pertuan Agong: Sultan Iskandar
- Raja Permaisuri Agong: Sultanah Zanariah
- Prime Minister: Dato' Sri Dr Mahathir Mohamad
- Deputy Prime Minister: Dato' Musa Hitam
- Lord President: Mohamed Salleh Abas

=== State level ===
- Sultan of Johor: Tunku Ibrahim Ismail (Regent)
- Sultan of Kedah: Sultan Abdul Halim Muadzam Shah
- Sultan of Kelantan: Sultan Ismail Petra
- Raja of Perlis: Tuanku Syed Putra
- Sultan of Perak: Sultan Azlan Shah (Deputy Yang di-Pertuan Agong)
- Sultan of Pahang: Sultan Ahmad Shah
- Sultan of Selangor: Sultan Salahuddin Abdul Aziz Shah
- Sultan of Terengganu: Sultan Mahmud Al-Muktafi Billah Shah
- Yang di-Pertuan Besar of Negeri Sembilan: Tuanku Jaafar
- Yang di-Pertua Negeri (Governor) of Penang: Tun Dr Awang Hassan
- Yang di-Pertua Negeri (Governor) of Malacca: Tun Syed Ahmad Al-Haj bin Syed Mahmud Shahabuddin
- Yang di-Pertua Negeri (Governor) of Sarawak:
  - Tun Abdul Rahman Ya'kub (until February)
  - Tun Ahmad Zaidi Adruce Mohammed Noor (from February)
- Yang di-Pertua Negeri (Governor) of Sabah: Tun Mohamad Adnan Robert

== Events ==
- January - Tunku Osman Becomes Tunku Johore.
- 11 January – The Kompleks Tun Abdul Razak (KOMTAR) in Penang, at the time the tallest building in Southeast Asia, was officially opened by Prime Minister Mahathir Mohamad.
- 30 March – The Malaysian Parliament celebrated the 25th anniversary of its formation.
- April – The first Belilah Barangan Buatan Malaysia (Made in Malaysia) campaign was launched.
- 1 June -- TV3's 1st Anniversary 1985 Ulang Tahun Pertama TV3
- 2 June – Malaysia's first teletext service, Beriteks was launched.
- 8 July – The new Tabung Haji building at Jalan Tun Razak, Kuala Lumpur was officially opened by Prime Minister Mahathir Mohamad.
- 10 July – The first Malaysian national car Proton Saga was officially launched by Prime Minister Mahathir Mohamad with the first cars coming off from the production line in July 9.
- 2 August – Official opening ceremony of the Penang Bridge by Prime Minister Mahathir Mohamad. He drove across the bridge in a red Proton Saga carrying the national flag to officiate the opening ceremony.
- 31 August – The Proclamation of Independence Memorial (formerly The Malacca Club) in Malacca Town, Malacca was officially opened by Prime Minister Mahathir Mohamad.
- 2 September – Sultan Salahuddin Abdul Aziz Shah of Selangor celebrated the silver jubilee (25th anniversary) of his throne.
- 2 September – The Putra World Trade Centre (PWTC), Malaysia's first convention and exhibition centre, was officially opened by Prime Minister Mahathir Mohamad and the 1985 UMNO General Assembly was held in Dewan Merdeka, PWTC for the first time.
- 14 September – The Penang Bridge officially opened to traffic.
- 19 November – The Memali Incident took place in the remote village of Memali near Baling, Kedah. About 14 civilians and four policemen were killed, including Islamic sect leader, Ibrahim Mahmud (Ibrahim Libya).
- 9 December – Sultan Azlan Shah was installed as the 34th Sultan of Perak.

== Births ==
- 7 February - Dina Nadzir, singer
- 17 March - Pierre Andre, actor
- 7 July – Zulkifli Che Ros, weightlifter
- 26 September – Cameron Tovey, Malaysian-Australian basketball player
- 18 September – Koo Kien Keat – Badminton player
- 11 December – Siow Yi Ting – Swimmer
- 30 December – Datchinamurthy Kataiah – Drug trafficker (executed 2025)

== Deaths ==
- 2 March – Tan Sri Runme Shaw, Chairman and founder of the Shaw Organisation of Singapore (b. 1901).
- 9 July – Muhammad Jusoh, 8th Menteri Besar of Pahang (b. 1912).
- 26 August – Amar Ilaji Marzuki Nor, former acting Yang di-Pertuan Negeri of Sarawak (b. 1913).
- 9 September – Tan Sri Yaacob Abdul Latiff, 2nd Mayor of Kuala Lumpur (b. 1918).
- 3 November – Tan Tong Hye, former Secretary-General of the Malaysian Chinese Association (b. 1914).
- 14 December – Tun Sardon Jubir, 2nd Minister of Communications and 4th Yang di-Pertua Negeri of Penang (b. 1917).
- 18 December – Lim Lian Geok, Malaysian-Chinese educator (b. 1901).

== See also ==
- 1985
- 1984 in Malaysia | 1986 in Malaysia
- History of Malaysia
