= 1984 in Malaysia =

- Decades: 1960s; 1970s; 1980s; 1990s; 2000s
- See also: Other events of 1984; History of Malaysia • Timeline • Years

This article lists important figures and events in Malaysian public affairs during the year 1984, together with births and deaths of notable Malaysians.

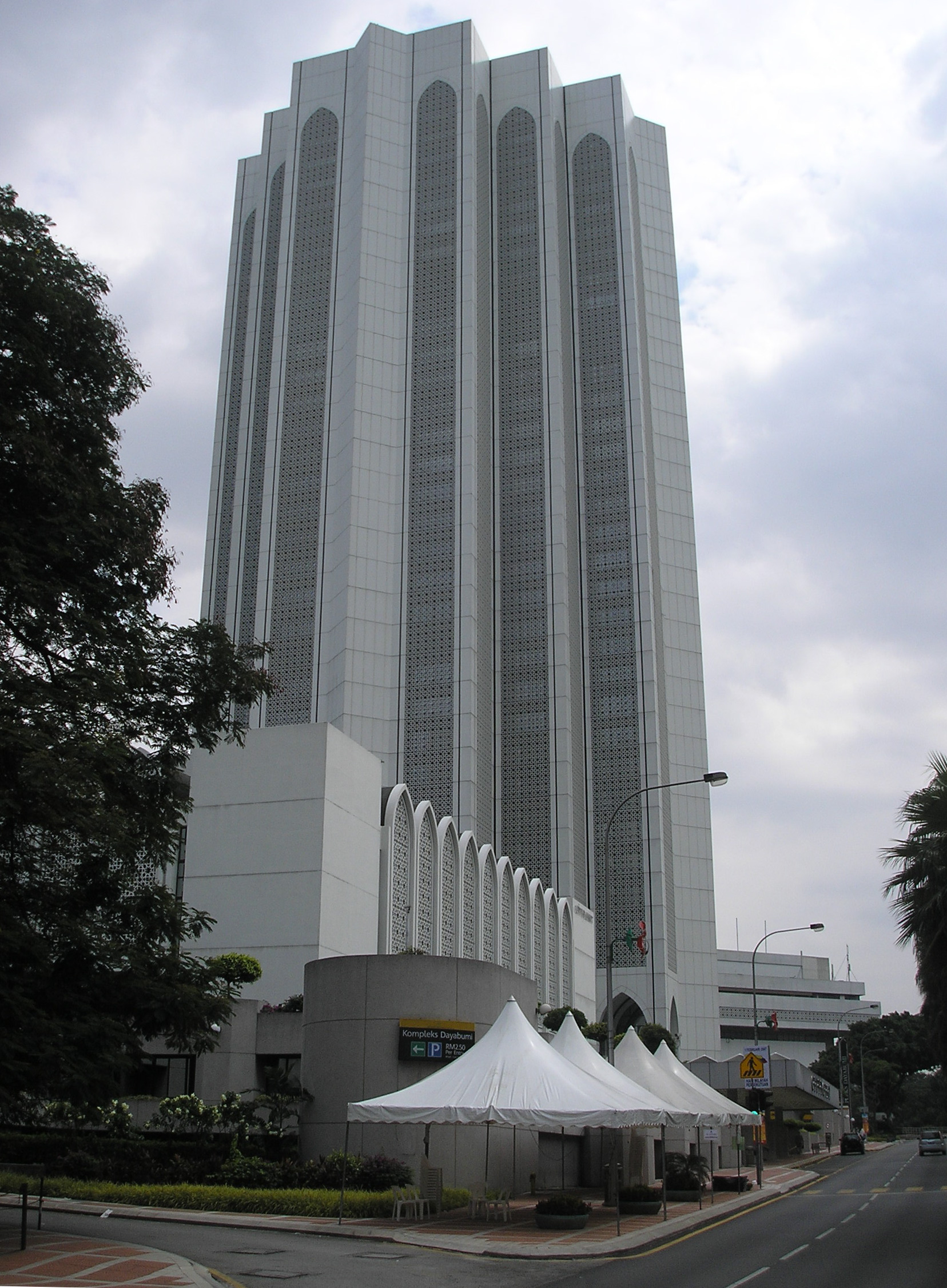
Dayabumi, completed in 1984.

== Incumbent political figures ==
=== Federal level ===
- Yang di-Pertuan Agong:
  - Sultan Ahmad Shah (until 25 April)
  - Sultan Iskandar (from 26 April)
- Raja Permaisuri Agong:
  - Tengku Ampuan Afzan (until 25 April)
  - Sultanah Zanariah (from 26 April)
- Prime Minister: Dato' Sri Dr Mahathir Mohamad
- Deputy Prime Minister: Dato' Musa Hitam
- Lord President: Azlan Shah then Mohamed Salleh Abas

=== State level ===
- Sultan of Johor: Tunku Ibrahim Ismail (Regent from 26 April)
- Sultan of Kedah: Sultan Abdul Halim Muadzam Shah
- Sultan of Kelantan: Sultan Ismail Petra
- Raja of Perlis: Tuanku Syed Putra
- Sultan of Perak:
  - Sultan Idris Shah II (until 31 January)
  - Sultan Azlan Shah (from 3 February) (Deputy Yang di-Pertuan Agong)
- Sultan of Pahang: Tengku Abdullah (Regent until 25 April)
- Sultan of Selangor: Sultan Salahuddin Abdul Aziz Shah
- Sultan of Terengganu: Sultan Mahmud Al-Muktafi Billah Shah
- Yang di-Pertuan Besar of Negeri Sembilan: Tuanku Jaafar
- Yang di-Pertua Negeri (Governor) of Penang: Tun Dr Awang Hassan
- Yang di-Pertua Negeri (Governor) of Malacca:
  - Tun Syed Zahiruddin bin Syed Hassan (Until February)
  - Tun Syed Ahmad Al-Haj bin Syed Mahmud Shahabuddin (From February)
- Yang di-Pertua Negeri (Governor) of Sarawak: Tun Abdul Rahman Ya'kub
- Yang di-Pertua Negeri (Governor) of Sabah: Tun Mohd Adnan Robert

== Events ==
- 1 January – Hotel Majestic (later occupied by Balai Seni Lukis Negara (National Art Gallery)) was closed after 52 years of operation. It reopened in 2012.
- 11 January – Dr. Zaini Shaarani, an employee of Kuala Lumpur City Hall (DBKL) became the first Malaysian to scale the Mount Kala Pattar in the Himalayas.
- 12 January – The National Incorporation policy and Agriculture policy were introduced.
- January – The federal government planned to build a transit system between Sentul and Petaling Jaya.
- 31 January – Sultan Idris Shah II of Perak died suddenly after suffering a heart attack in Lumut, Perak. On 3 February, he was replaced by his nephew, Sultan Azlan Shah as the 34th Sultan of Perak.
- February – The Kuala Lumpur International Marathon was held for the first time.
- February – Johore Safari World closed after three years of operation.
- 11 April – Official opening of the new Sabah Museum by the Yang di-Pertuan Agong, Sultan Ahmad Shah of Pahang.
- 16 April – Labuan island became the second Federal Territory after Kuala Lumpur.
- 26 April – Sultan Iskandar of Johor was elected as the eighth Yang di-Pertuan Agong, replacing Sultan Ahmad Shah of Pahang.
- 5 May – Dayabumi, the famous landmark in Kuala Lumpur was opened.
- 17 May – The Edaran Otomobil Nasional Berhad (EON) was established.
- 7 June – The name "Saga" was chosen for the first national cars.
- 22 September – Sultan Iskandar of Johor was installed as the eighth Yang di-Pertuan Agong.

== Births ==
- 29 January – Safee Sali, footballer
- 28 March – Fasha Sandha – actress
- 30 June – Tunku Ismail Ibrahim – Tunku Mahkota (Crown Prince) of Johor and officer of the Indian Army
- 4 December – Leong Mun Yee – diver
- 18 December – Sara Kamil Yusof – synchronised swimmer

== Deaths ==
- 31 January – Idris Shah II of Perak, 33rd Sultan of Perak (b. 1924)
- 1 September – Luo Jian, Alternate Member of the Central Committee of the Malayan Communist Party (b. 1921)
- 9 September – Osman Talib, 1st Chief Minister of Malacca (b. 1925)
- 29 November – Liew Yit Fan, Editor of Min Sheng Pao and Central Committee Member of the Malayan Communist Party (b. 1911)

== See also ==
- 1984
- 1983 in Malaysia | 1985 in Malaysia
- History of Malaysia
