= 1983 in Malaysia =

- Decades: 1960s; 1970s; 1980s; 1990s; 2000s
- See also: Other events of 1983; History of Malaysia • Timeline • Years

This article lists important figures and events in Malaysian public affairs during the year 1983, together with births and deaths of notable Malaysians.

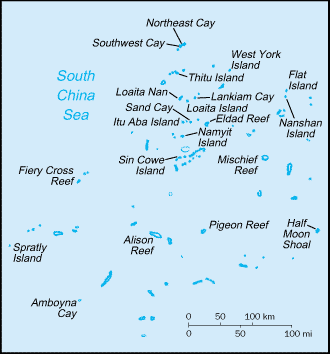
Map of the Spratly Islands.

== Incumbent political figures ==
=== Federal level ===
- Yang di-Pertuan Agong: Sultan Ahmad Shah
- Raja Permaisuri Agong: Tengku Ampuan Afzan
- Prime Minister: Dato' Sri Dr Mahathir Mohamad
- Deputy Prime Minister: Dato' Musa Hitam
- Lord President: Azlan Shah

=== State level ===
- Sultan of Johor: Sultan Iskandar
- Sultan of Kedah: Sultan Abdul Halim Muadzam Shah
- Sultan of Kelantan: Sultan Ismail Petra
- Raja of Perlis: Tuanku Syed Putra
- Sultan of Perak: Sultan Idris Shah II
- Sultan of Pahang: Tengku Abdullah (Regent)
- Sultan of Selangor: Sultan Salahuddin Abdul Aziz Shah
- Sultan of Terengganu: Sultan Mahmud Al-Muktafi Billah Shah
- Yang di-Pertuan Besar of Negeri Sembilan: Tuanku Jaafar (Deputy Yang di-Pertuan Agong)
- Yang di-Pertua Negeri (Governor) of Penang: Tun Dr Awang Hassan
- Yang di-Pertua Negeri (Governor) of Malacca: Tun Syed Zahiruddin bin Syed Hassan
- Yang di-Pertua Negeri (Governor) of Sarawak: Tun Abdul Rahman Ya'kub
- Yang di-Pertua Negeri (Governor) of Sabah: Tun Mohd Adnan Robert

== Events ==
- 23 January – The VIP platform in Batu Caves, Selangor collapsed during Thaipusam.
- February – Malaysia officially occupied the Layang-Layang Islands or "Swallow Reefs" atolls, one of the Spratly Islands. A naval base and resort was later built at this location.
- 10 May – The International Islamic University Malaysia (IIUM) was established.
- 7 May – The Perusahan Otomobil Nasional Berhad (PROTON) was established.
- 1 July – Bank Islam Malaysia (BIMB), Malaysia's first Islamic bank was founded.
- 1 September – A Malaysian named Siow Woon Kwang was among the victims in Korean Air Lines Flight 007 that was shot down by a Soviet interceptor jet and crashed near Moneron Island, Soviet Union, killing all 269 passengers.
- 18 December – An Airbus A300 (OY-KAA) leased from Scandinavian Airlines as Malaysia Airlines Flight 684 crashed 2 km short of the runway at Subang Airport on a flight from Singapore. There were no fatalities, but the aircraft was written off.

== Births ==
- 10 March – Che'Nelle – R&B singer
- 25 April – Suzanna Ghazali Bujang – synchronised swimmer
- 30 April – Yeoh Ken Nee – diver
- 1 May – Wong Mew Choo – badminton player
- 6 May – Namewee – singer
- 26 August – Nicol Ann David – squash player
- 14 September - Liyana Fizi - singer-songwriter
- 27 September – Fazura – actress
- 15 October – Jacquelyn Chan – synchronised swimmer

== Deaths ==
- 19 January – Ahmad Boestamam – Malay author and nationalist
- 31 March – James Beveridge Thomson – first Lord President of the Supreme Court of Malaysia
- 25 April – Salmah Ismail (Saloma) – Wife and widow of Malaysian film actor, director singer, and songwriter P. Ramlee

== See also ==
- 1983
- 1982 in Malaysia | 1984 in Malaysia
- History of Malaysia
