= Ismail of Johor =

Sultan of Johor from 1959 to 1981

Ismail إسماعيل
- Al-Khalidi (The Everlasting)
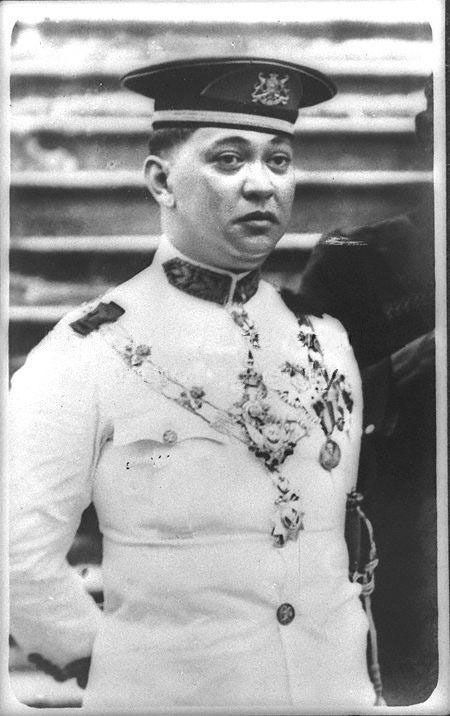

Sultan of Johor
- Reign: 8 May 1959 – 10 May 1981
- Coronation: 10 February 1960
- Predecessor: Sultan Ibrahim
- Successor: Sultan Iskandar
- Chief Ministers: See list: Wan Idris Ibrahim Hassan Yunus Othman Saat

Tunku Mahkota of Johor
- Reign: 7 September 1895 – 8 May 1959
- Born: 28 October 1894; Istana Semayam, Johor Bahru, Johor, British Malaya
- Died: 10 May 1981 (aged 86); Hospital Sultanah Aminah, Johor Bahru, Johor, Malaysia
- Burial: 11 May 1981; Mahmoodiah Royal Mausoleum, Johor Bahru, Johor
- Spouse: Sultanah Ungku Tun Aminah binti Ungku Ahmad (m. 1920; died 1977); Sultanah Nora binti Tengku Panglima Raja Tengku Ahmad (m. 1977)
- Issue: Tunku Abdul Jalil; Tunku Kalthum Maimunah; Tunku Abdul Rahman; Tunku Mahmood Iskandar; Tunku Abdul Rahman; Tunku Helen; Tunku Tun Maimunah
Names
- Tunku Ismail ibni Tunku Ibrahim Iskandar (at birth)
- House: Temenggong
- Father: Sultan Ibrahim Ibni Al-Marhum Sultan Abu Bakar Al-Khalil Ibrahim Shah
- Mother: Sultanah Ungku Maimunah binti Ungku Abdul Majid
- Religion: Sunni Islam

Ismail Al-Khalidi Ibni Almarhum Sultan Sir Ibrahim Al-Masyhur KBE CMG (Jawi: سلطان سر إسماعيل الخالدي ابن المرحوم سلطان سر إبراهيم المشهور; October 1894 – 10 May 1981) was the 3rd sultan of modern Johor.

== Early life ==
Tunku Ismail was born on 28 October 1894 in the Istana Semayam in Johor Bahru and was the second and eldest surviving son of Tunku Ibrahim (later Sultan Ibrahim) by his first wife, Sultanah Ungku Maimunah binti Ungku Abdul Majid. He was made the Tunku Mahkota of Johor on 2 November 1895, when Tunku Ibrahim was installed as the Sultan of Johor following Sultan Abu Bakar's death. He started his early education in a Malay school in Johor Bahru. In 1904, he was sent to England to attend Rose Hill School in Tunbridge Wells, Kent; Aldeburgh Lodge School in Suffolk; Roydon Hall in Norfolk; and Christ Church in Oxford. His brothers, Tunku Abu Bakar and Tunku Ahmad, as well as five friends, including Onn Jaafar, later followed suit. In 1910, Tunku Ismail, accompanied by Onn Jaafar, returned to Johor and spent three years in Perak, where they enrolled into the Malay College Kuala Kangsar. In 1913, he was once again sent to England to receive his tertiary education in a boarding school; his brothers again later followed suit until 5 March 1920.

== Regent ==
Tunku Ismail was made the Johor's regent in 1928 as Sultan Ibrahim began to spend more time travelling overseas. In 1937, Tunku Ismail appointed Onn Jaafar by this point a state executive councillor, as his private secretary and entrusted him to run the Johor Pavilion at the world fair in San Francisco the following year. Upon Onn's return from San Francisco, Tunku Ismail invited Onn to resume his former duties, which he accepted. Shortly before the Japanese armies occupied Johor during the Japanese Invasion of Malaya, Tunku Ismail fled to England out of fear that the Japanese military government may manipulate him onto the throne in his father's stead.

Tunku Ismail returned to Johor after the war and was confronted with Malay nationalist movements which had erupted as a result of the rulers' dissatisfaction with the Malayan Union scheme. While Sultan Ibrahim faced widespread criticisms from the Malay grassroots and nationalist leaders due to his initial willingness to sign the Malayan Union scheme treaties with Sir Harold MacMichael, Tunku Ismail maintained neutral relations between the British government and the Malay nationalist leaders. Nevertheless, Tunku Ismail officiated the opening ceremony of the United Malays National Organisation's (UMNO) first congress which was held at the Istana Besar in May 1946 while Sultan Ibrahim was residing in London.

Tunku Ismail took over state affairs during the late 1940s and 1950s, and presented on his father's behalf at official functions. On 27 August 1957, Tunku Ismail was one of the nine royal signatories at the royal signing ceremony of the Malaya's Federal Constitution. Nevertheless, he faced mild opposition from a few nationalist leaders in Johor, notably Ungku Abdullah, the party leader of Persatuan Kebangsaan Melayu Johor (PKMJ), a nationalist party that advocated for Johor's secession from Malaya. A few days before signing the Federal constitution, Ungku Abdullah cabled to Sultan Ibrahim to boycott the signing ceremony, who notified Ungku Abdullah that he had since delegated the state's executive powers to Tunku Ismail. Ungku Abdullah called for Tunku Ismail to boycott the signing ceremony, who quickly turned him down.

== Sultan of Johor ==
Tunku Ismail succeeded his father as the Sultan of Johor on 8 May 1959. He was crowned at Throne Room of the Istana Besar, Johor Bahru on 10 February 1960. The Sultan was known to be very close to his subjects; he made annual trips to visit selected villages in the eight districts of Johor and frequently acquainted himself with the civil servants working for the state government.

== Succession issue ==
On 10 August 1961, he stripped his eldest son Tunku Mahmood Iskandar, of the post of Tunku Mahkota due to misconduct–although he was given the post of Raja Muda on 1 December 1966. His second son, Tunku Abdul Rahman (1933–1989) became the Tunku Mahkota instead. However, shortly before his death in April 1981, Sultan Ismail reappointed Tunku Iskandar as the Tunku Mahkota, who succeeded him the following month.

== Personal life ==
A meek and quiet ruler by nature, Sultan Ismail was an animal lover and was instrumental in the setting up of the Johor Zoo. He also had a collection of wild animals ranging from deer to crocodiles. Among the Chinese community in Johor, he was known affectionately as "Lau Sultan", literally meaning "an old or elderly Sultan".

Sultan Ismail married twice. Both wives served as Sultanahs of Johor. They were:

- Sultanah Ungku Tun Aminah binti Ungku Ahmad (born 5 February 1905 – 14 September 1977), a second cousin of the Sultan, married on 30 August 1920. Sultanah Aminah died in a road accident in 1977. He had seven children with her, only three of whom survived into adulthood:
  - Tunku Abdul Jalil (born 1924-1925)
  - Tunku Kalthum Maimunah (born 1927-1930)
  - Tunku Abdul Rahman (born 1930-1930)
  - Tunku Mahmood Iskandar (Sultan of Johor) (born 1932-2010)
  - Tunku Abdul Rahman (Tunku Bendahara of Johor) (born 1933-1989)
  - Tunku Helen (born 1936-1937)
  - Tunku Tun Maimunah (Tunku Gedong) (born 1939-2012)
- Sultanah Tengku Nora binti Tengku Panglima Raja Ahmad (born 10 October 1937), member of the Kelantanese royal household, married on 13 November 1977. She is the sister of Tengku Zanariah, the spouse of Sultan Iskandar.

He was the first Chancellor of Universiti Teknologi Malaysia when the institution was established in 1975.

In August 1977, Sultan Ismail and his wife, Ungku Tun Aminah binti Ungku Ahmad, were in a car accident in Kulai. While his wife was permanently left in a vegetative state until her death a month later owing to brain damage, the Sultan survived with only minor injuries. Nevertheless, the ordeal passed rather quickly, and Sultan Ismail remarried in November 1977 to Tengku Nora. Tengku Nora was subsequently crowned as sultanah the following October 1978.

== Death ==
Sultan Ismail died on 10 May 1981 at 6:12 pm at the Royal Ward Hospital Besar, Johor Bahru after being admitted two weeks earlier following an illness at the age 86. His death was only officially announced at 8:45 pm by Menteri Besar of Johor Tan Sri Dato' Haji Othman Saat. He was brought to the Istana Besar, Johor Bahru for laying in state and was buried in the Mahmoodiah Royal Mausoleum the next day. His son the Tunku Mahkota of Johor Tunku Mahmood Iskandar was proclaimed as the next Sultan of Johor on 11 May.

== Legacy ==
Several institutions and places were named after Sultan Ismail, including:

- Sultan Ismail Road, Kuala Lumpur
- Sultan Ismail Bridge, Muar
- Sultan Ismail International Airport, Senai
- Sultan Ismail Library, Larkin
- Sultan Ismail Mosque, Universiti Teknologi Malaysia
- Sultan Ismail Jamek Mosque, Batu Pahat
- Sultan Ismail Specialist Hospital, Taman Austin Perdana, Johor Bahru
- Sultan Ismail Building in Kota Iskandar, Iskandar Puteri

== Honours ==
=== Honours of Johor ===
- Grand Master (1959–1981) and First Class of the Royal Family Order of Johor (DK I, 16 July 1920)
- Grand Master (1959–1981) and First Class of the Order of the Crown of Johor (SPMJ) – Dato' (1941)
- Founding Grand Master (1975–1981) and Knight Grand Commander of the Order of the Loyalty of Sultan Ismail (SSIJ) – Dato' (28 October 1975)
- First Class of the Sultan Ibrahim Medal (PIS, 1928)

=== Honours of Malaya ===
- Malaya
  - Recipient of the Order of the Crown of the Realm (DMN, 1960)
  - Grand Commander of the Order of the Defender of the Realm (SMN) – Tun (1958)
- Malaysia
  - Recipient of the Malaysian Commemorative Medal (Gold) (PPM) (1965)
- Kelantan
  - Recipient of the Royal Family Order or Star of Yunus (DK)
  - Knight Grand Commander of the Order of the Crown of Kelantan (SPMK) – Dato'
- Pahang
  - Member 1st class of the Family Order of the Crown of Indra of Pahang (DK I, 22 April 1968)
- Perak
  - Recipient of the Royal Family Order of Perak (DK, 27 October 1969)
- Selangor
  - First Class of the Royal Family Order of Selangor (DK I, 4 May 1975)
- Terengganu
  - First Class Member of the first class of the Family Order of Terengganu (DK)

=== Foreign honours ===
- Brunei
  - First Class of the Family Order of Brunei (DK) – Dato Laila Utama (23 September 1958)
- Italy
  - Grand Officer of the Order of the Crown of Italy (1938)
- Romania
  - Grand Officer of the Order of the Star of Romania (16 July 1920)
- Siam
  - Knight Grand Cross of the Order of the Crown of Siam (21 July 1925)
- United Kingdom
  - Knight Commander of the Order of the British Empire (KBE) - Sir (11 May 1938)
  - Honorary Companion of the Order of St Michael and St George (CMG) (1 January 1926)
  - Recipient of the King George V Silver Jubilee Medal (6 May 1935)
  - Recipient of the King George VI Coronation Medal (12 May 1937)
  - Recipient of the Queen Elizabeth II Coronation Medal (2 June 1953)

== Notes ==
Regnal titles
Preceded by Sultan Ibrahim	Sultan of Johor; 1959–1981	Succeeded by Sultan Iskandar
