= 1986 in Malaysia =

- Decades: 1960s; 1970s; 1980s; 1990s; 2000s
- See also: Other events of 1986; History of Malaysia • Timeline • Years

This article lists important figures and events in Malaysian public affairs during the year 1986, together with births and deaths of notable Malaysians.

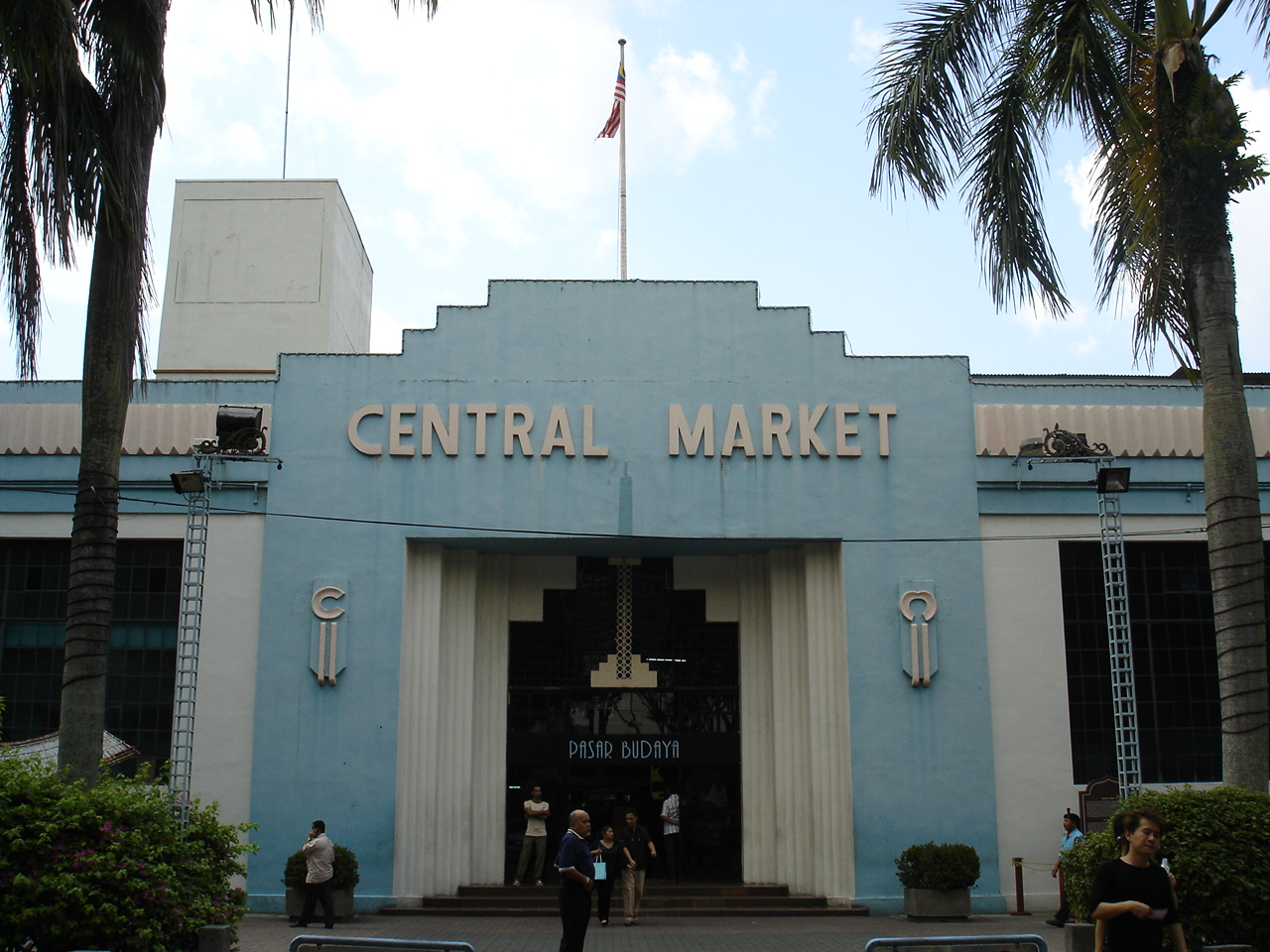
The vibrant and colourful Central Market.

== Incumbent political figures ==
=== Federal level ===
- Yang di-Pertuan Agong: Sultan Iskandar of Johor
- Raja Permaisuri Agong: Sultanah Zanariah of Johor
- Prime Minister: Dato' Sri Dr Mahathir Mohamad
- Deputy Prime Minister:
  - Dato' Musa Hitam (until 9 May)
  - Dato' Ghafar Baba (from 10 May)
- Lord President: Mohamed Salleh Abas

=== State level ===
- Sultan of Johor: Tunku Ibrahim Ismail (Regent)
- Sultan of Kedah: Sultan Abdul Halim Muadzam Shah
- Sultan of Kelantan: Sultan Ismail Petra
- Raja of Perlis: Tuanku Syed Putra
- Sultan of Perak: Sultan Azlan Shah (Deputy Yang di-Pertuan Agong)
- Sultan of Pahang: Sultan Ahmad Shah
- Sultan of Selangor: Sultan Salahuddin Abdul Aziz Shah
- Sultan of Terengganu: Sultan Mahmud Al-Muktafi Billah Shah
- Yang di-Pertuan Besar of Negeri Sembilan: Tuanku Jaafar
- Yang di-Pertua Negeri (Governor) of Penang: Tun Dr Awang Hassan
- Yang di-Pertua Negeri (Governor) of Malacca: Tun Syed Ahmad Al-Haj bin Syed Mahmud Shahabuddin
- Yang di-Pertua Negeri (Governor) of Sarawak: Tun Ahmad Zaidi Adruce Mohammed Noor
- Yang di-Pertua Negeri (Governor) of Sabah: Tun Mohd Adnan Robert

== Events ==
- 3 January – SMK Lembah Keramat, Selangor was founded and opened to public.
- 7 January – Ling Liong Sik became Transport Minister.
- March – Rioters, protesting against the appointment of the Chief Minister and Head of State, detonated bombs and committed arson around major towns in the 1986 Sabah riots.
- March – Johor Circuit (Pasir Gudang), the second Malaysian race track circuit after Batu Tiga Circuit in Shah Alam, Selangor was officially opened.
- 22 March – The P. Ramlee Memorial at Jalan Dedap, Taman P. Ramlee, Setapak, Kuala Lumpur was opened to the public.
- April – Central Market, Kuala Lumpur's newest attraction, was officially opened. Previously it had been a wet market.
- 12–16 April – The 1986 Pacific Asia Travel Association (PATA) General Conference was held.
- 14 April – Sudirman Arshad held an open-air concert on Chow Kit Road, which was the first time ever that a street concert drew a 100,000-person crowd on a Monday night.
- 10 May – Abdul Ghafar Baba became Deputy Prime Minister, replacing Musa Hitam.
- 27 June – Highway Concessionnaires Berhad, Malaysia's second highway concessionnaires operator, was founded.
- 17 July – The opening of Malacca Sultanate Palace Museum in Malacca City, Malacca.
- Deposit-taking co-operative scandal
- 3 August – The 1986 General Elections.
- 3 September – Ling Liong Sik became MCA President.
- 17–22 October – The Pudu Prison siege took place at Pudu Prison, Kuala Lumpur. On October 22, the hostage crisis at the prison ended without bloodshed. Six prisoners were captured and two hostages were rescued.
- November – Ferry Malaysia was launched at Kuantan Port, Pahang.
- 6 December – Langkawi Island acquired a duty-free status.

== Births ==
- 26 February – Queenzy Cheng – Actress, Singer (d. 2023)
- 10 June – Sharifah Amani – Actress
- 3 July – Felixia Yeap (Raissyah Rania Yeap) – Model
- 25 October – Zul Ariffin – Actor

== Deaths ==
- 7 July – Kevin Barlow and Brian Chambers, two Australian nationals were hanged to death for the trafficking of 141.9g of heroin.
- 28 November – Tuanku Bujang Tuanku Othman, 2nd Yang di-Pertua Negeri of Sarawak (1969–1977)

== See also ==
- 1986
- 1985 in Malaysia | 1987 in Malaysia
- History of Malaysia
