= 1987 in Malaysia =

- Decades: 1960s; 1970s; 1980s; 1990s; 2000s
- See also: Other events of 1987; History of Malaysia • Timeline • Years

This article lists important figures and events in Malaysian public affairs during the year 1987, together with births and deaths of notable Malaysians.

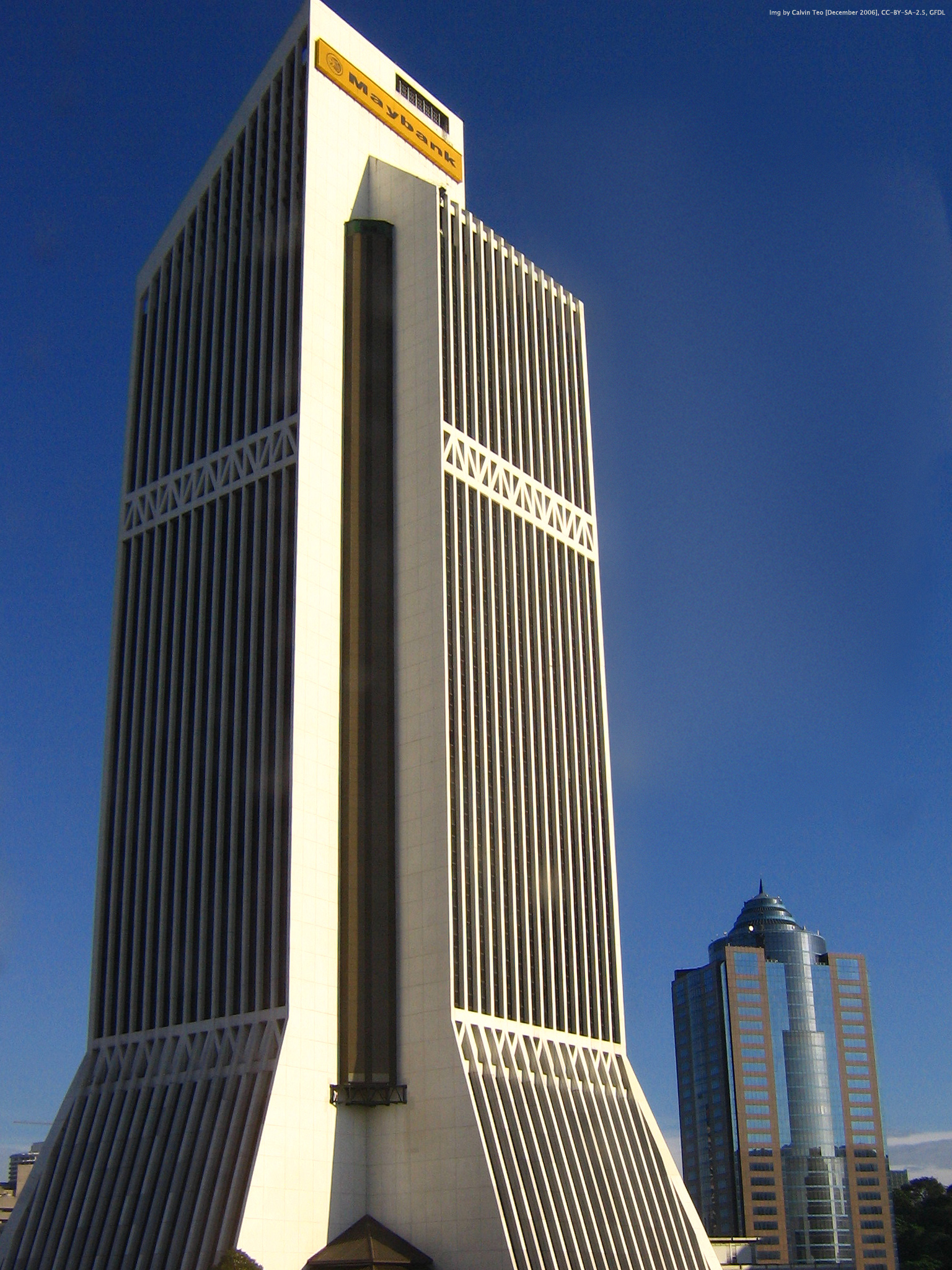
The Maybank Tower, which was completed in 1987.

== Incumbent political figures ==
=== Federal level ===
- Yang di-Pertuan Agong: Sultan Iskandar
- Raja Permaisuri Agong: Sultanah Zanariah
- Prime Minister: Dato' Sri Dr Mahathir Mohamad
- Deputy Prime Minister: Dato' Ghafar Baba
- Lord President: Mohamed Salleh Abas

=== State level ===
- Sultan of Johor: Tunku Ibrahim Ismail (Regent)
- Sultan of Kedah: Sultan Abdul Halim Muadzam Shah
- Sultan of Kelantan: Sultan Ismail Petra
- Raja of Perlis: Tuanku Syed Putra
- Sultan of Perak: Sultan Azlan Shah (Deputy Yang di-Pertuan Agong)
- Sultan of Pahang: Sultan Ahmad Shah
- Sultan of Selangor: Sultan Salahuddin Abdul Aziz Shah
- Sultan of Terengganu: Sultan Mahmud Al-Muktafi Billah Shah
- Yang di-Pertuan Besar of Negeri Sembilan: Tuanku Jaafar
- Yang di-Pertua Negeri (Governor) of Penang: Tun Dr Awang Hassan
- Yang di-Pertua Negeri (Governor) of Malacca: Tun Syed Ahmad Al-Haj bin Syed Mahmud Shahabuddin
- Yang di-Pertua Negeri (Governor) of Sarawak: Tun Ahmad Zaidi Adruce Mohammed Noor
- Yang di-Pertua Negeri (Governor) of Sabah:
  - Tun Mohd Adnan Robert (Until November)
  - Tun Said Keruak (From November)

== Events ==
- 1 January – Jabatan Telekom (Telecommunication Department) was incorporated as Syarikat Telekom Malaysia Berhad (STM).
- February – The Carcosa was returned to the Government of Malaysia and renamed "Carcosa Seri Negara".
- 9 March – During the Ming Court political crisis of Sarawak, 27 out of the 48 state assemblymen suddenly announced their support for Abdul Rahman Ya'kub while calling Abdul Taib Mahmud to resign as chief minister.
- April – The Malaysian constitutional crisis occurred.
- 12 April – The murder of Ang May Hong happened in Jalan Ipoh, Kuala Lumpur, Malaysia
- 16 April – Abdul Taib Mahmud won the Sarawak state election after the Ming Court crisis.
- June – Menara Maybank or Maybank Tower became the tallest building in Kuala Lumpur.
- July – Opening of the Petronas petroleum and gas refinery in Kerteh, Terengganu.
- September – 1987 World Silat Championships.
- 1 October – The closed-toll system came into force along the Kuala Lumpur–Ayer Keroh and Ipoh–Changkat Jering expressways.
- 15 October – Malaysian Airline System (MAS) changed its corporate identity and became known as Malaysia Airlines.
- 27 October – Operation Lalang. More than 100 opposition activists were arrested, including Lim Kit Siang, under the Internal Security Act (ISA).
- 28 October – The hatchback version of the Proton Saga "Aeroback" was launched.

== Births ==
- 31 July –Pannir Selvam Pranthaman, drug trafficker (executed 2025)
- 3 August – Aidil Zafuan, footballer
- 18 September – Tan Boon Heong, badminton player

== Deaths ==
- 15 January – Mustapha Hussain, left-wing Malay nationalist, independence fighter and former Vice President of the Kesatuan Melayu Muda (b. 1910).
- 9 February – Andrew Janggi Muyang, SNAP Member of Parliament for Lubok Antu, Sarawak (b. 1947).
- 21 February – Abdul Hamid Mustapha, Secretary-General of the United Sabah National Organisation and Member of Parliament for Limbawang, Sabah (b. 1942).
- 25 September – Jaafar Hassan, 4th Menteri Besar of Perlis (b. 1925).
- 14 December – Roseyatimah, Malay film actress (b. 1943).
- 22 December – Tawi Sli, 2nd Chief Minister of Sarawak (b. 1912).

== See also ==
- 1987
- 1986 in Malaysia | 1988 in Malaysia
- History of Malaysia
