= Liyana =

Liyana may refer to:

- Liyana (film), a 2017 Swazi documentary film
- Liyana Jasmay, a Malaysian actress
- Liyana Fizi, a Malaysian musician
- Liyana, a Zimbabwean band fronted by Prudence Mabhena
