= Memali Incident =

1985 incident between the Malaysian police and the Malaysian Islamic Party

Memali Siege
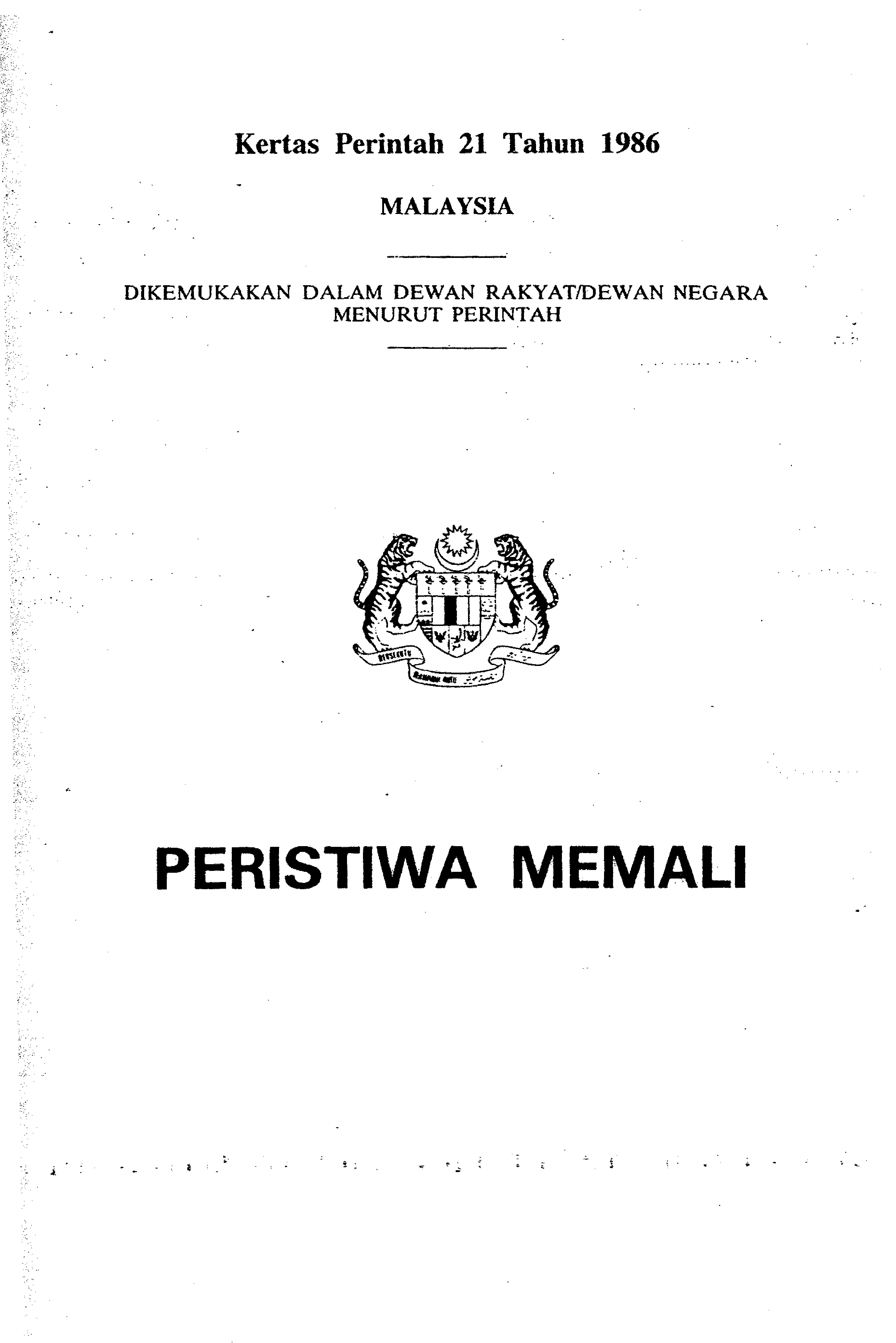
- Government white paper over the incident, presented to the Parliament in 1986.
Date	19 November 1985
Location	Kampung Memali, Baling, Kedah, Malaysia 5.815754°N 100.894549°E
Result	Malaysian Government victory: Ibrahim Mahmud killed.; Mass arrest of Ibrahim's followers.

Belligerents
Government of Malaysia: Royal Malaysia Police; UMNO	PAS

Commanders and leaders
Mahathir Mohamad; Musa Hitam; Mohammed Hanif Omar	Ibrahim Mahmud †

Strength
200 policemen	400 followers Unknown number of armed villagers

Casualties and losses
4 killed	14 killed 159 arrested
- Location within Malaysia Memali Incident (Peninsular Malaysia)

The Memali Incident (Malay: Peristiwa Memali) or code-named as Operasi Angkara ("Operation Cause") and Operasi Hapus ("Operation Destroy") was a major incident that occurred in the remote village of Kampung Memali, Baling in the Malaysian state of Kedah on 19 November 1985.

A team of 200 policemen, under orders from the Deputy Prime Minister Musa Hitam, laid siege to kampung (village) houses in Memali, 20 kilometer north of Baling town in Kedah. The houses were occupied by a group of about 400 people led by Ibrahim Mahmud a.k.a. Ibrahim Libya. The siege resulted in the deaths of 14 villagers and 4 policemen.

== Background ==
The Memali Incident followed severely strained relationships between UMNO and PAS, two major political parties in Malaysia. Some PAS leaders had concluded that UMNO members were apostate. In 1981, Hadi Awang, (who was then PAS state commissioner for Terengganu, and has been PAS President since 2002) claimed that UMNO perpetuated the unIslamic rule of colonialism, and therefore the struggle of PAS and its supporters against UMNO is jihad, and that those who died in the struggle are al-shahid (martyrs). In the wake of Hadi's claims, there was a serious rift in the Malay Muslim community. In Besut, Terengganu for example, communities were split to the extent that communal prayers were done separately for UMNO and for PAS congregations.

=== Ibrahim Mahmud ===
Ibrahim was a local religious teacher who had received part of his education at the University of Tripoli in Libya, hence his nickname Ibrahim Libya. The police wanted to arrest Ibrahim Mahmud under the Internal Security Act, for creating discord and disharmony, but he refused to give himself up. Ibrahim was also accused of harbouring two brothers, Yusof Che Mit and Ramli Che Mit, who were fugitives. Revered by the village folks, who called him Ustaz Ibrahim, they vowed to defend him to the death.

Ibrahim attended Sekolah Rendah Kebangsaan Weng in Baling before furthering his studies in Islamic studies at Sekolah Agama Ittifaqiah, Kg Carok Putih, Weng and later Pondok Al-Khariah, Pokok Sena, Seberang Perai. Ibrahim Mahmud attended the University of Tripoli in Libya. He had also studied in India and at Al-Azhar University in Cairo.

Upon his return, he worked as a preacher with Pusat Islam. He appeared on television to lecture on topics of Islam. Allegedly, Ibrahim was involved in the 1974 Baling Demonstrations along with Anwar Ibrahim. Ibrahim Mahmud's politics drifted towards those of PAS. His close association with PAS worried the government of Dr. Mahathir Mohamad. In 1978, Ibrahim contested the elections for the seat of Bayu-Baling as a PAS candidate. Ibrahim polled 5,081 votes as opposed to the Barisan Nasional candidate who polled 6,169 votes. In 1982, Ibrahim again contested for the same seat but lost by 100 votes.

Pusat Islam looked into his teachings and thereafter banned him from lecturing in the media or to give lectures in mosques and suraus throughout the nation. Pusat Islam also started making allegations of 'deviationist acts' against him. Ibrahim was called a fanatic who challenged the integrity of the Government.

== Aftermath ==
=== Death toll ===
The police action left 14 civilians and 4 policemen dead. The villagers were armed with a few guns, machetes, sharpened bamboo rods, and other rudimentary weapons. The police used heavy vehicles. At the height of the assault, some villagers, men and women, came out in the open in a state of frenzy and hysteria. Deputy Prime Minister Musa Hitam, who was also Home Affairs Minister, announced to the media that 14 'criminals' had been killed in Kampung Memali in clashes with security forces.

=== Arrests ===
Police detained 159 people, including women and children. Thirty-six persons involved in the incident were arrested under the Internal Security Act in January 1986 but later released in June.

=== Government White Paper ===
The government published a white paper and showed an official video recording of the incident on national television. The White Paper on the incident said the extremists tried to spread deviationist teachings and disrupt public order.

The Malaysian Government released video footage culled from police tapes of the operation on prime time television on TV1, the primary government television station. The video showed villagers armed with parangs, slingshots and Molotov cocktails taunting and protesting the actions of the Federal Reserve Unit troopers. The video also showed a mortally wounded police sergeant writhing in pain while awaiting help.

In February 2002, TV1 showed the confessions of a man involved in the Memali incident. The Information Ministry's Zainuddin Maidin explained that the man would relate how he was influenced to participate. Zainuddin said the intention of the broadcast was to show the truth. PAS was concerned over plans to air the video clip as it may have implications on a pending court case involving the families of those killed in the incident. A PAS official said they were not worried about the political impact of the video clip because PAS believes the people would not blindly accept it.

=== Consequences ===
PAS called those who died as al-shahid, those who have achieved shahid (martyrs). Ibrahim Mahmud is called al-Shahid Ibrahim. This was in stark contrast to the Government's stand of calling those who dies as "criminals". The Kedah State Fatwa Council took the dramatic step of issuing a Fatwa saying that those who died were not al-shahid as claimed by PAS. The National Fatwa Council on 3 February 1986 also ruled that the deaths of Ibrahim Libya and his followers were not martyrdom.

Al-Mau'nah founder and leader, Mohamed Amin Mohamed Razali was allegedly present during part of the Memali Incident. The incident became part of his motive for the Al-Ma'unah establishment, to overthrow the Malaysian government.

Kamaruzaman Yusoff views that the "Memali Incident entailed the interpretation and materialisation of the concepts of jihād and syahid. A re-interpretation of these two concepts has manifested itself in the recent Al-Mau'nah Incident and the activities of the Kumpulan Militan Malaysia (Malaysian Militant Group) that tried to effect political changes through unconstitutional means; and this is certainly in contrast to PAS' willingness to participate in the Malaysian electoral process."

At the time of the incident, media reported Dr. Mahathir Mohamad was away on a visit to China, and identified Musa as the Acting Prime Minister. That story remained unchanged until 2014, nearly 29 years later, when Musa revealed that Dr. Mahathir was in fact still in his office in Malaysia. Musa categorically denied he was the Acting Prime Minister at that time. In response, Dr. Mahathir confirmed that, contrary to past news reports, he was in Malaysia on the day of the siege. Following these revelations, PAS called for formation of a Royal Commission of Inquiry (RCI) to probe the Memali incident and to retract the white paper on the incident, but this was rejected by Parliament. As of April 2014, survivors were continuing to seek an explanation of the incident from the government.

=== Memali fund ===
A fund known as the Memali Fund was set up to collect donation for the next-of-kin of Ibrahim Libya and those who died during the Memali Incident. PAS through Harakah had urged generous donations to the fund to help the families of Ibrahim and his men which the party regarded as martyrs. A PAS member lodged a police report against alleged misappropriation. This led to a public outcry and prompted PAS president Fadzil Noor to investigate.

== See also ==
- Siege of Lal Masjid
- Operation Blue Star
- Raba'a Massacre
- Waco siege
