= Order of Loyalty of Sultan Ismail of Johor =

The Most Blessed Order of the Loyalty of Sultan Ismail Darjah Setia Sultan Ismail Johor

Awarded by the Sultan of Johor
- Type: Order
- Status: Currently constituted
- Sovereign: Ibrahim Ismail of Johor
- Grades: Grand Commander (SSIJ); Commander (DSIJ)

Precedence
- Next (higher): Order of the Crown of Johor
- Ribbon bar of the order

The Most Blessed Order of the Loyalty of Sultan Ismail (Darjah Setia Sultan Ismail Johor Yang Amat di-Berkati) is a knighthood order of the sultanate of Johor.

== History ==
The Order has been founded in 1975.

== Classes ==
The Order has the following classes of merit:

- Grand Commander (Dato' Sri Setia, post-nominal letters : SSIJ)
- Commander (Dato' Setia, post-nominal letters : DSIJ)

Attached to the order are two stars known as the Sultan Ismail Star (Bintang Sultan Ismail) in gold and silver, which effectively function as the third and fourth classes of the order.

- First class in Gold (crown only) or Pangkat Pertama Emas (post-nominal letters : BSI I)
- Second class in Silver or Pangkat Kedua Perak (post-nominal letters : BSI II)

== Insignia ==
- The sash is plain azur blue

== Notable recipients ==
=== Grand Commander (S.S.I.J) ===
- Tunku Abdul Rahman (28 October 1975)
- Iskandar of Johor (28 October 1975)
- Tunku Temenggong Ahmad (28 October 1975)
- Othman Saat (28 October 1975, revoked 1982)
- Abdul Hamid Mustapha (28 October 1975)
- Ibrahim Ismail of Johor (8 April 1990)
- Tunku Puan Nora (8 April 1996)
- Tunku Puan Zanariah
- Tunku Ismail Idris (22 November 2010)
- Mohamed Noah Omar
- Musa Hitam
- Abdul Kadir Yusof
- Mohamed Rahmat
- Lee San Choon
- Sulaiman Ninam Shah
- Syed Nasir Ismail
- Teh Hong Piow
- Tan Kim Chua
- Tan Hong Chiang

== See also ==
- Orders, decorations, and medals of Johor
- Order of precedence in Johor
- List of post-nominal letters (Johor)
