= Tunku Puan Nora =

Sultanah of Johor from 1978 to 1981

Tunku Puan Nora تونكو ڤوان نورة
- Tunku Puan
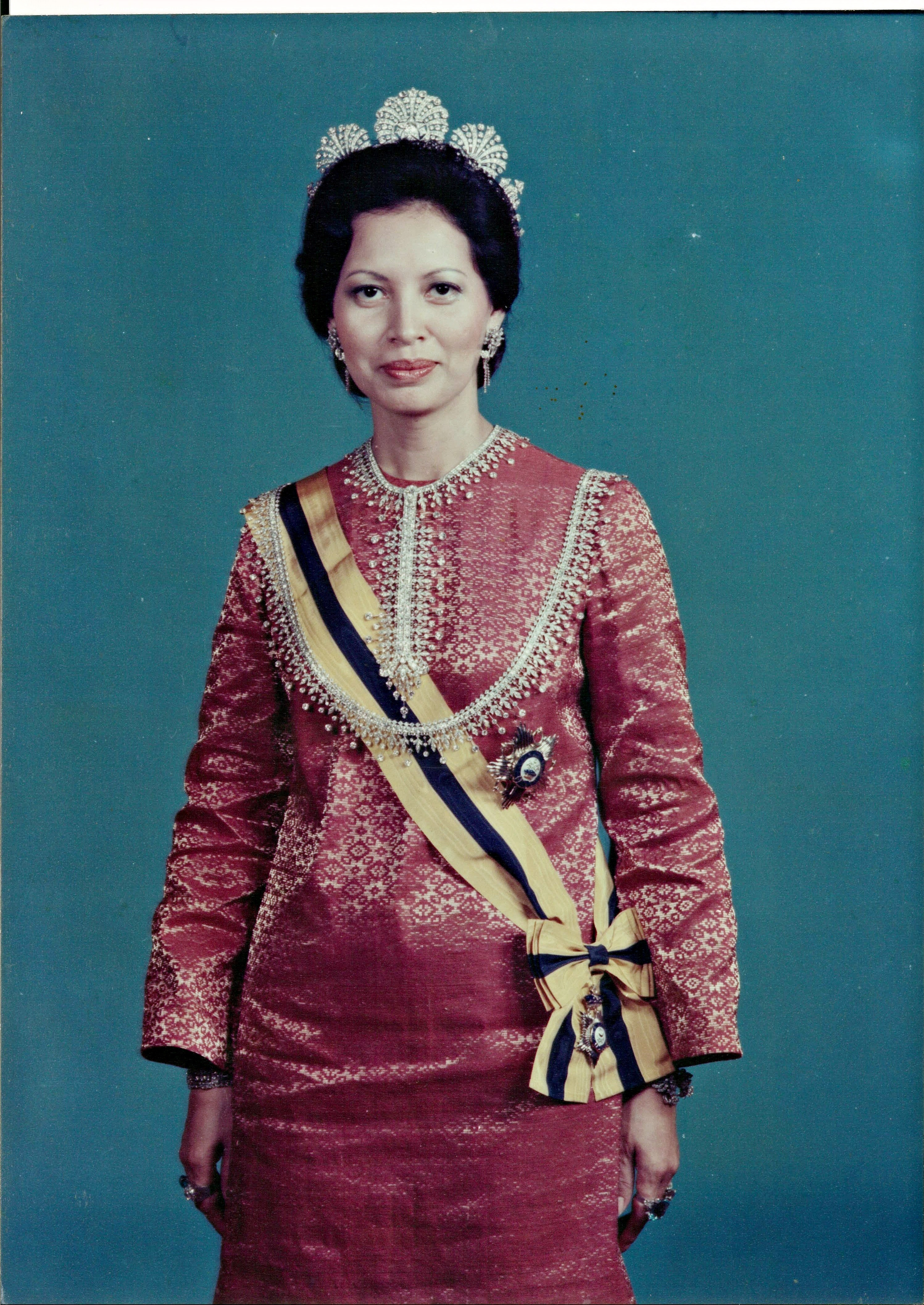

Sultanah of Johor
- Reign: 13 November 1977 – 10 May 1981
- Coronation: 28 October 1978
- Predecessor: Sultanah Aminah
- Successor: Sultanah Zanariah
- Born: Tengku Nora binti Tengku Ahmad; 10 October 1937 (age 88); Istana Dusun Green, Pasir Mas, Kelantan, British Malaya
- Spouse: Sultan Ismail (m. 1977; died 1981)
Names
- Tengku Nora binti Almarhum Tengku Panglima Raja Tengku Ahmad
Regnal name
- Tunku Puan Nora Ismail
- House: Temenggong (by marriage); Long Yunus (by birth)
- Father: Tengku Long Ahmad bin Tengku Abdul Ghaffar
- Mother: Che Puan Hajah Fatimah binti Dato' Abdul Hamid
- Religion: Sunni Islam

Tunku Puan Nora Ismail (Jawi: تونكو ڤوان نورة إسماعيل), formerly known as Sultanah Nora (born Tengku Nora binti Tengku Ahmad; 10 October 1937) was the Sultanah of Johor from 1978 to 1981. She is the sister of late Tunku Puan Zanariah who was also the Sultanah of Johor from 1981 to 2010. She is the daughter of Tengku Panglima Raja Tengku Long Ahmad bin Tengku Temenggong Long Abdul Ghaffar of Kelantan.

In 2011, Sultanah Nora was given the title Yang Amat Mulia Tunku Puan Nora Ismail while Sultanah Zanariah was titled Yang Amat Mulia Tunku Puan Zanariah Iskandar in continuation of a royal tradition following the proclamation of a new queen.

== Personal life ==
Tengku Nora was born on 10 October 1937 at Istana Dusun Green, Pasir Mas, Kelantan. She is the sixth of the nine children of Tengku Panglima Raja Tengku Long Ahmad bin Tengku Temenggong Tengku Abdul Ghaffar and Che Puan Hajah Fatimah binti Dato' Abdul Hamid out of nine siblings. Her sister, the late Tengku Zanariah was the wife of the late Sultan Iskandar of Johor.

Tengku Nora received her early education at Pasir Mas English School and Zainab School in Kota Bharu, Kelantan. After that, she attended Bukit Nanas Convent School, Kuala Lumpur for three years. Later, she continued her studies at Southend-on-Sea College in England in the fields of literature, social science, and home science. In her spare time, her enjoys gardening, exercising, playing golf, and attending religious classes.

== Marriage ==
She married Sultan Ismail of Johor at Istana Bukit Serene, Johor Bahru on 13 November 1977 as his second wife following the death of his first wife Sultanah Aminah on 14 September 1977.

== Coronation ==
She was crowned as the Sultanah of Johor in conjunction with Sultan Ismail's 84th birthday on 28 October 1978 at Istana Besar Johor.

== Honours ==
- Johor
  - First Class of the Most Esteemed Royal Family Order of Johor (DK I, 28 October 1978)
  - Knight Grand Commander of the Most Honourable Order of the Crown of Johor (SPMJ, 28 October 1978)
  - Knight Grand Companion of the Most Blessed Order of Loyalty of Sultan Ismail of Johor (SSIJ, 8 April 1996)
- Kelantan
  - Knight Grand Commander of the Most Illustrious Order of the Crown of Kelantan (SPMK, 1994)

== Eponym ==
- Hospital Sultanah Nora Ismail, Batu Pahat, Johor

Tunku Puan Nora Royal Family of Johor Born: 10 October 1937
Malaysian royalty
| Preceded by Tunku Puan Fawzia Abdullah | Tunku Puan Johor; 2011 – present | Incumbent |
