= Sultan Ismail Jamek Mosque =

Mosque in Batu Pahat, Johor, Malaysia

- Masjid Jamek Sultan Ismail مسجد جامع سلطان إسماعيل
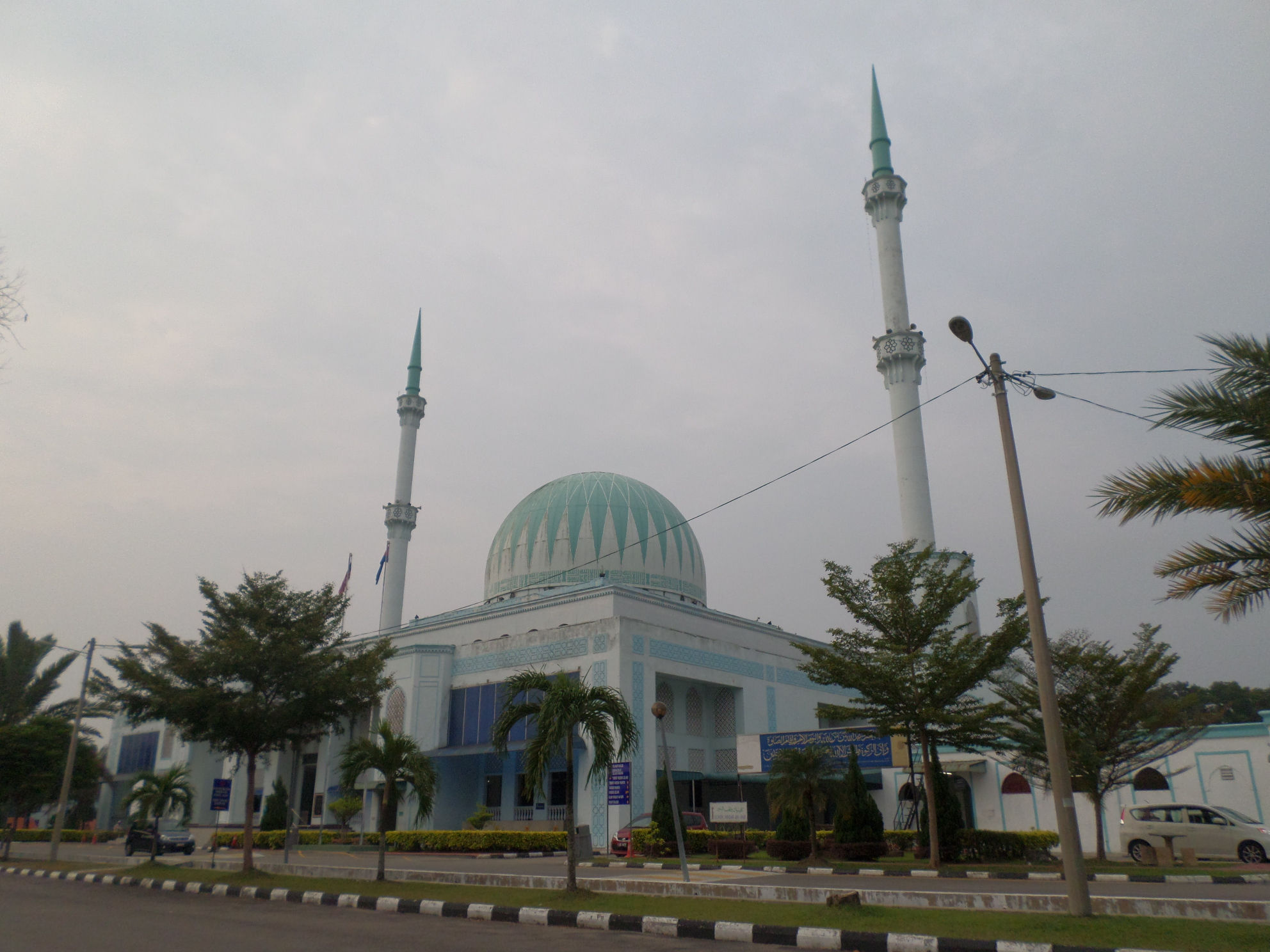

- Location within Johor

Location
- Location: Batu Pahat, Johor, Malaysia
- Interactive map of Sultan Ismail Jamek Mosque
- Coordinates: 1.8551°N 102.9467°E

Architecture
- Type: mosque
- Completed: 1996

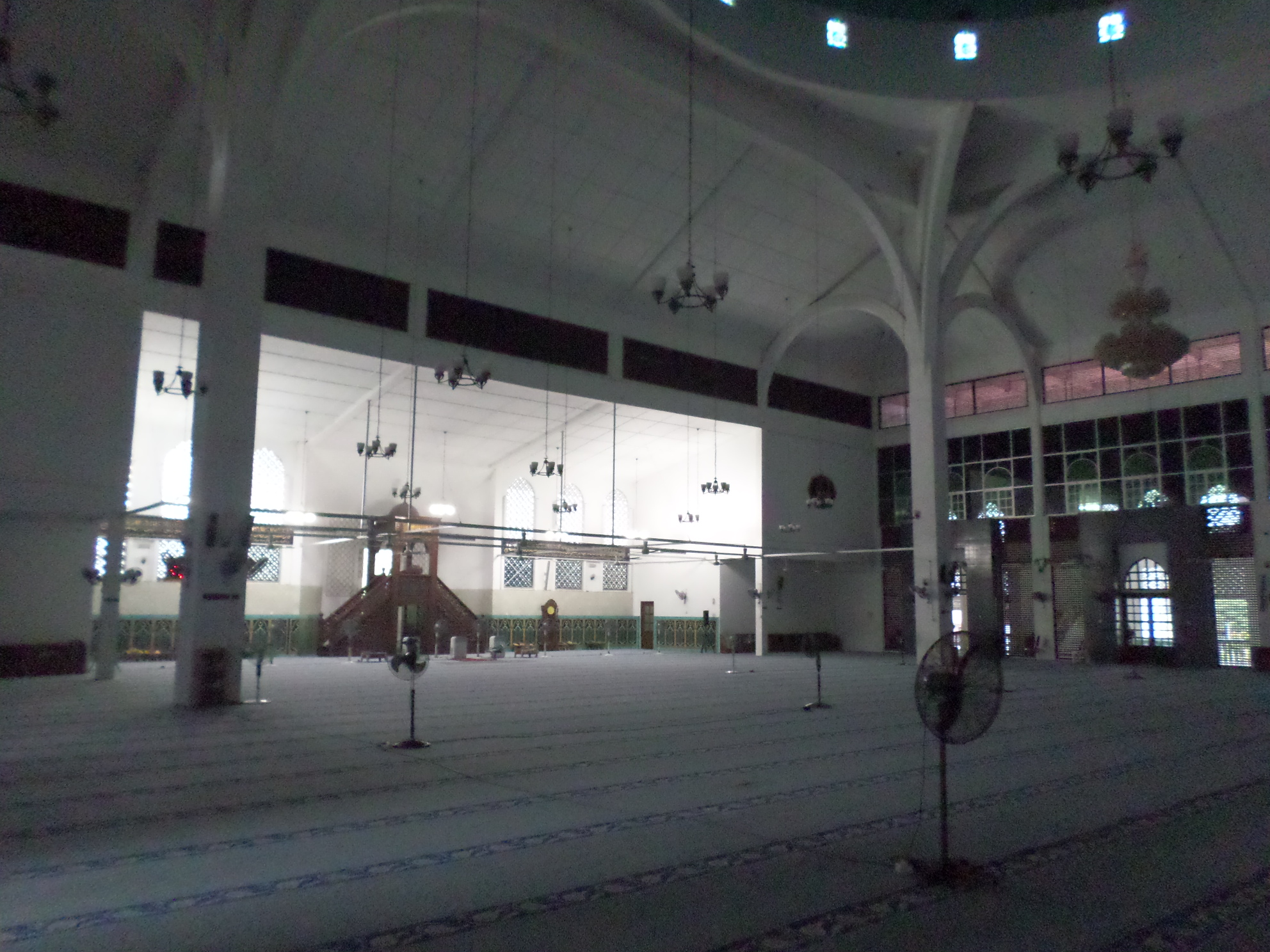
Sultan Ismail Jamek Mosque prayer hall

The Sultan Ismail Jamek Mosque (Malay: Masjid Jamek Sultan Ismail) is the largest mosque in Batu Pahat town in Johor, Malaysia.

== History ==
The mosque was opened in 1996.

== See also ==
- Islam in Malaysia
