= Tunku Abdul Rahman (1933–1989) =

- Born: Tunku Abdul Rahman ibni Tunku Ismail; 25 November 1933; Istana Semayam, Johor Bahru, Johor, Unfederated Malay States, British Malaya
- Died: 12 July 1989 (aged 55); Istana Pasir Pelangi, Johor Bahru, Johor, Malaysia
- Burial: 13 July 1989; Mahmoodiah Royal Mausoleum, Johor Bahru, Johor, Malaysia
- Spouse: Tunku Hajjah Shahariah binti Al-Marhum Tuanku Abdul Rahman (m. 1956–1989)
- Issue: Tunku Abu Bakar
Names
- Tunku Abdul Rahman ibni Tunku Ismail (at birth)
- House: Temenggong
- Father: Sultan Ismail of Johor
- Mother: Sultanah Ungku Tun Aminah

Tunku Abdul Rahman ibni Al-Marhum Sultan Ismail (25 November 1933 – 12 July 1989) was the younger son of Sultan Ismail of Johor as well as the younger brother of Sultan Iskandar of Johor. Tunku Abdul Rahman held the post of Tunku Mahkota (Crown Prince) for twenty years until shortly before his father's death in 1981. The termination of his post generated considerable controversy for a brief period of time.

== Succession crisis ==
Tunku Abdul Rahman was appointed Tunku Mahkota of Johor by his father, Sultan Ismail on 10 August 1961, after his brother, Tunku Iskandar (later Sultan Iskandar) was disinherited from the post on grounds of alleged misbehaviour. Five years later in December 1966, Tunku Iskandar was appointed as the Raja Muda at the request of their father, Sultan Ismail and was approved by the Council of Royal Court, and placing him second in line to the royal throne behind Tunku Abdul Rahman. On 29 April 1981, as Sultan Ismail lay ill on his deathbed, Tunku Iskandar was appointed Tunku Mahkota in favour of him.

The decision took many people by surprise, including the then-Menteri Besar of Johor, Othman Saat who promptly criticised the Sultan's actions, and earning the wrath of Tunku Iskandar at the same time. Tunku Abdul Rahman, on the other hand, initially remained silent but later took his grievances to the press and expressed his shock and disappointment over his father's decision, suggesting that he had done nothing wrong in the twenty years as the Tunku Mahkota and also cited some of his significant contributions to the state during his tenure.

== Personal life ==
His wife was Tunku Shahariah, the younger child of Abdul Rahman and Tunku Puan Besar Kurshiah of Negeri Sembilan. Their only son, Tunku Abu Bakar, married Gusti Raden Ajeng Retno Astrini, the youngest daughter of Kanjeng Gusti Pangeran Adipati Arya Mangkunegara VIII and Gusti Kanjeng Putri Mangkunegara VIII of Central Java, Indonesia.

== Later life ==
After the succession crisis, Tunku Abdul Rahman reverted to his old post of Tunku Bendahara, which he had briefly held from 1959 to 1961. Tunku Abdul Rahman, by now in ailing health, held that post until his death in 1989. In his later years, his health, already plagued by diabetes, worsened, which ultimately saw one of his legs being amputated.

After his death, the post of Tunku Bendahara was passed down to Sultan Iskandar's younger son, Tunku Abdul Majid.

== Honours ==
- Johor
  - First Class of the Royal Family Order of Johor (DK I) (1962)
  - Second Class of the Royal Family Order of Johor (DK II) (1959)
  - Knight Grand Commander of the Order of the Crown of Johor (SPMJ) – Dato' (1964)
- Perak
  - Grand Knight of the Order of Cura Si Manja Kini (SPCM) – Dato' Seri (1971)
- Kedah
  - Knight Grand Companion of the Order of Loyalty to the Royal House of Kedah (SSDK) – Dato' Seri (1983)
- Brunei
  - Coronation Medal (1 August 1968)
