= Liyana Fizi =

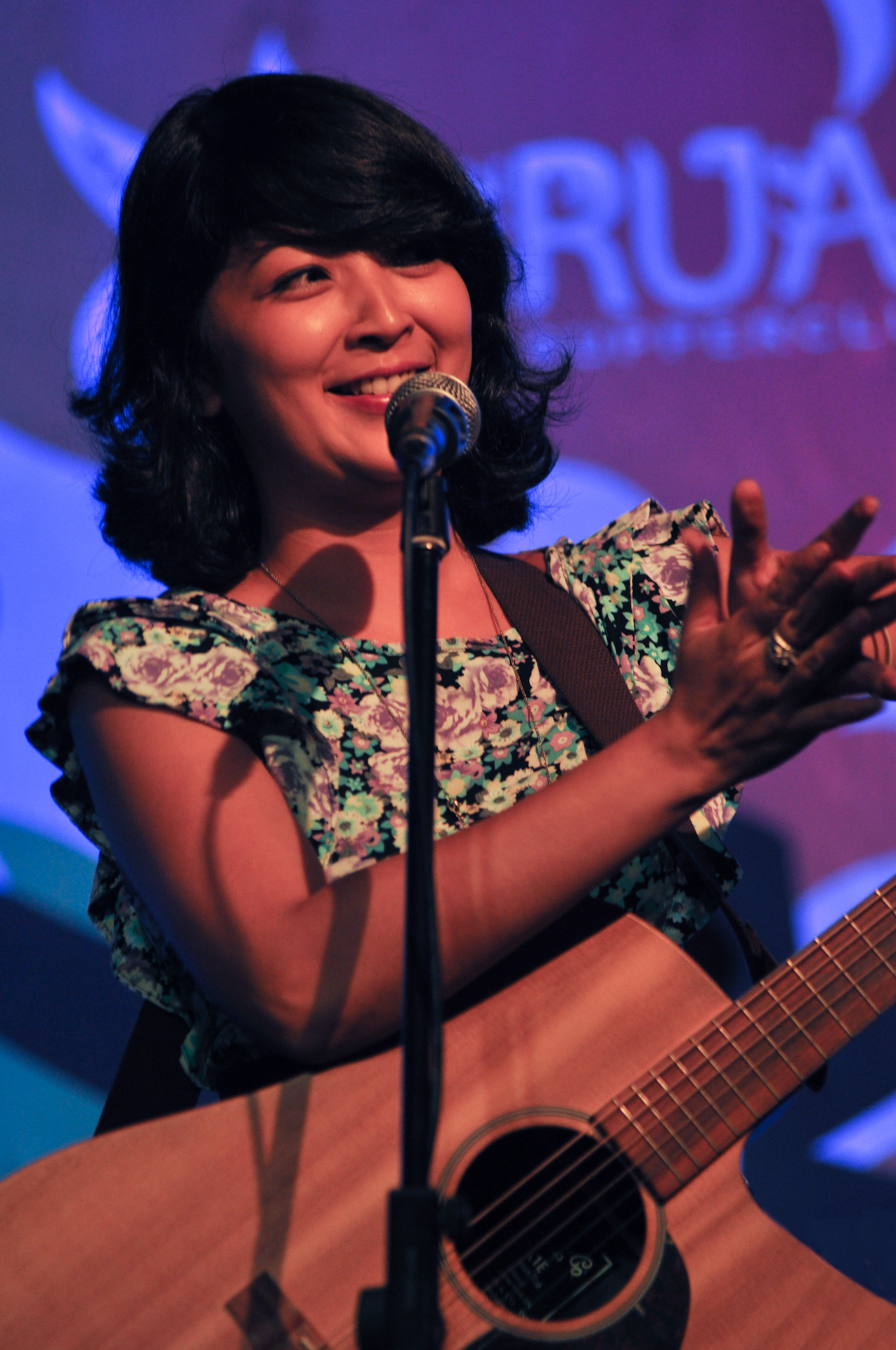
- Liyana at the FlyFM Campur Charts concert on 8 December 2010

Background information
- Born: 14 September 1983 (age 43); Kuala Lumpur, Malaysia
- Genres: Indie, folk, bossa nova
- Occupations: Singer, rhythm guitarist, songwriter, lyricist, recording artist
- Instruments: Vocal, guitar
- Years active: 2006–present
- Labels: Laguna Records (2007–2009), Liyana Fizi Music Publishing (2009–present)

Liyana Fizi (born 14 September 1983) is a Malaysian singer, musician, songwriter, composer and producer. She is a former lead singer of the Malaysian jazz band Estrella. She started performing music in 2006 and earned eight nominations in the Voize Independent Music Awards in 2008.

As a solo artist Liyana launched her debut album, Between the Lines, in September 2011. The album contains 11 songs, including songs composed by Liyana herself. The album was released under her own label, Liyana Fizi Music Publishing, and distributed locally by Soundscape Records. One of the songs, "Jatuh", was featured in the soundtrack of Azura, a movie directed by Aziz M. Osman.

== Early life ==
Liyana was born on 14 September 1983 at the Kuala Lumpur Hospital. The family lived for a while in Brunei when Liyana was a small child but later moved to Shah Alam, where she grew up. Her mother is from Negeri Sembilan with Jakun, Jawa, Chinese, and Dutch heritage. Her father's is from Kedah and has Thai, Mamak, Arab heritage.

== Career ==
=== Estrella ===
Liyana was one of the founding members of Malaysian band together with Adzwan Ani, Estrella during its formation in 2007 where she was the lead vocalist and rhythm guitarist. The band's debut eponymous studio album was released on 28 December 2007 under Laguna Records (now Laguna Music). The songs "Stay", "Ternyata", and "Take it Slow" were released as singles with music videos. Liyana left the band after her contract with the band and the label ended in 2009. Since then, she has been performing as a solo artist.

=== Solo career ===
After Estrella was disbanded in 2009, Liyana decided to continue her solo career and set up her own publishing company, Liyana Fizi Music Publishing. In September 2011, her first solo album Between the Lines was launched at Bentley Music Mutiara Damansara with "Light Writing" as its first single.

=== Other performances ===
Liyana acted in the musical comedy film Kami Histeria (2014) directed by Shamyl Othman as an invited actress.

== Personal life ==
Liyana married Zulfadly Helmi, a Malaysian interior designer and landscape architect. on 25 March 2018.

== Personal life ==
Liyana married Zulfadly Helmi, a Malaysian landscape architect, environmental designer, and musician on 25 March 2018. Liyana Fizi on her IG: on this date, six years ago. alhamdulillah <3

== Discography ==
Album with Estrella

- Estrella (2007)

Solo albums

- Between the Lines (2011)

== Filmography ==
- Kami Histeria (2014) – Cameo appearances
