= Tunku Puan Zanariah =

Raja Permaisuri Agong from 1984 to 1989

Zanariah زانريه
- Tunku Puan
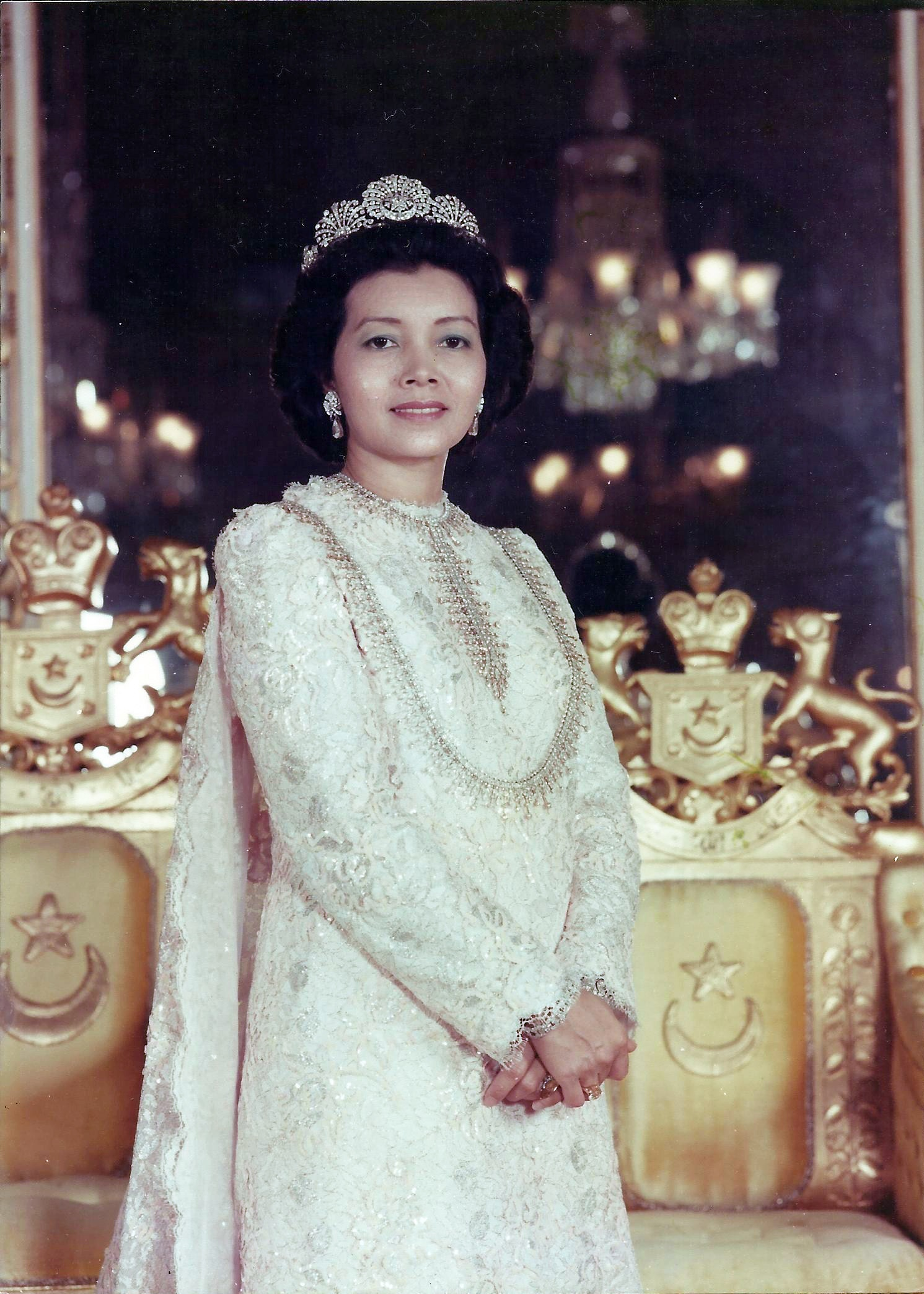
- Official photo

Queen consort of Malaysia
- Tenure: 26 April 1984 – 25 April 1989
- Installation: 15 November 1984
- Predecessor: Tengku Ampuan Afzan
- Successor: Tuanku Bainun

Sultanah of Johor
- Tenure: 29 April 1981 – 22 January 2010
- Proclamation: 11 May 1981
- Predecessor: Sultanah Nora
- Successor: Raja Zarith Sofiah (as Permaisuri)
- Born: 5 July 1940; Istana Dusun Green, Pasir Mas, Kelantan
- Died: 17 March 2019 (aged 78); Johor Bahru, Johor
- Burial: 18 March 2019; Mahmoodiah Royal Mausoleum, Johor Bahru, Johor
- Spouse: Sultan Iskandar (m. 1961; died 2010)
- Issue: Tunku Mariam Zaharah; Tunku Noraini Fatimah; Tunku Maimunah Ismailiah; Tunku Abdul Majid Idris Ismail Ibrahim; Tunku Muna Najiah; Tunku Aminah Kalsum Masera Marian Zahira Iskandariah
Names
- Tengku Zanariah binti Tengku Ahmad (at birth)
Regnal name
- Tunku Puan Zanariah Iskandar
- House: Temenggong (by marriage); Long Yunus (by birth)
- Father: Tengku Long Ahmad bin Tengku Abdul Ghaffar (Tengku Panglima Raja of Kelantan)
- Mother: Che Puan Hajah Fatimah binti Dato' Abdul Hamid
- Religion: Sunni Islam

Tunku Puan Zanariah Iskandar (Jawi: تونكو ڤوان زانريه إسكندر), formerly known as Sultanah Zanariah (born Tengku Zanariah binti Tengku Ahmad; 5 July 1940 – 17 March 2019), was the second wife of the fourth sultan of modern Johor, Sultan Iskandar from their marriage in 1961 until his death in 2010. She served as the 8th Raja Permaisuri Agong (Queen of Malaysia) between 1984 and 1989.

Her sister, Tunku Puan Nora formerly Sultanah Nora was married to the third Sultan of modern Johor, Sultan Ismail.

== Early life ==
Born on 5 July 1940, in Dusun Green Palace, Pasir Mas, Kelantan. Tengku Zanariah was the seventh child of HH Tengku Panglima Raja of Kelantan from among nine siblings. She came from the Kelantan royal family. Her father, the late Tengku Panglima Raja Tengku Ahmad was a son of Almarhum Tengku Temenggong Tengku Abdul Ghaffar Ibni Almarhum Long Senik Mulut Merah (Sultan Muhammad II).

Tengku Zanariah was enrolled into Sultanah Zainab School, Kelantan an elementary school where she studied from 1946 to 1949. From 1950 till 1952 she studied at the Convent Bukit Nanas in Kuala Lumpur before returning to Kelantan where she continued her studies at Sultan Ibrahim School, Pasir Mas. With the encouragement of her father and her own desire to equip herself for the future, she left for England in 1954 to further her studies at the Upper Chime School, Isle of Wight.

While studying in England, Tengku Zanariah met Tunku Mahmood Iskandar (later Sultan Iskandar) who was also studying there. They later married in 1961 (his second marriage) and she later became the mother of six of Tunku Mahmood's children.

Tengku Zanariah is also the former beauty queen and historically was the first ever Miss International Malaysia titleholders. She went to compete internationally representing Federation of Malaya at the first Miss International beauty pageant in 1960 at the Long Beach, California, United States. She failed to place in the semi-finals.

== Sultanah of Johor ==
Her husband became Sultan of Johor in 1981. Although she was known as Sultanah, she was never formally crowned.

In 1982, Tengku Zanariah sponsored and established the Majlis Wanita Negeri Johor or MAWAR (the Women's Council of Johor), which organises various religious activities such as the celebration of Prophet Muhammad's birthday at its headquarters at Sungai Cat Road in Johor Bahru. MAWAR also collected donations for distribution among flood victims in Johor as well as the less fortunate and the needy.

Her husband died in 2010 and was succeeded by her stepson Tunku Ibrahim Ismail. In 2011, a government circular issued removed the honorific prefix of 'Sultanah' from her given name, and instructed that she be referred to instead as 'Tunku Puan Zanariah Iskandar' or simply 'Tunku Zanariah'. (Note: Sultanah title was removed and changed to Tunku Puan later.) The current royal court also does not recognise her as a former holder of the title Sultanah of Johor.

== Interests ==
Tengku Zanariah had a passion for the arts. She also loved cooking and took great care in her daily chores. She paid special attention to the selection and arrangement of decorations in the palace particularly in preparation for official dinners. Tengku Zanariah also loved reading especially about culture, history and affairs of neighbouring countries.

She was also the winner of the first edition of Miss Malaya-International 1960 where she had rights to represent Malaya in the first edition of Miss International 1960 pageant in California, United States. Unfortunately, she was not placed in the pageant during that time.

During her free time, Tengku Zanariah loved to exercise, ride horses and play golf or tennis. She was also good in water skiing. During her younger days, she climbed Gunung Ledang, the highest mountain in Johor. She is currently the only consort to have done so.

== Patronages ==
- Chancellor of the University of Technology, Malaysia (UTM) from 1986 to 2010
- Patron of the Iskandar Puteri Foundation
- Patron of the Women's Council of Johor (MAWAR) from 1982 to 2011

== Death ==
Tengku Zanariah died on 17 March 2019. She was laid to rest next to grave of her late mother, Che Puan Hajah Fatimah at the Mahmoodiah Royal Mausoleum in Johor Bahru, Johor.

== Awards and recognitions ==
=== Honours of Johor ===
- Johor
  - First Class of the Royal Family Order of Johor (D.K., 28 October 1972)
  - Knight Grand Commander of the Order of the Loyalty of Sultan Ismail (S.S.I.J.)
  - Sultan Ibrahim Medal 1st class (P.I.S.)

=== Honours of Malaysia ===
- Malaysia
  - Recipient of the Order of the Crown of the Realm (D.M.N., 1987)
- Kelantan
  - Royal Family Order of Kelantan (D.K.)
- Kedah
  - Royal Family Order of Kedah (D.K.)

=== Foreign Honours ===
- Brunei
  - Order of Laila Utama First Class (Darjah Kerabat Laila Utama, D.K., 4 April 1987)
- South Korea
  - Grand Gwanghwa Medal of the Order of Diplomatic Service Merit (3 November 1988)

=== Places named after her ===
Several places were named after her, including:

- Sultanah Zanariah Library, a library in Universiti Teknologi Malaysia

== Notes ==
Malaysian royalty
Preceded by Tengku Afzan (Tengku Ampuan of Pahang)	Raja Permaisuri Agong (Queen of Malaysia)	Succeeded by Tuanku Bainun (Raja Permaisuri of Perak)
