= Musa Hitam =

Malaysian politician (born 1934)

Yang Amat Berbahagia Tun Musa Hitam SSM PMN SPMJ SPMS SPNS SPDK DUNM SSIJ PIS
- موسى هيتم

5th Deputy Prime Minister of Malaysia
- In office 18 July 1981 – 16 March 1986
- Monarchs: Ahmad Shah; Iskandar
- Prime Minister: Mahathir Mohamad
- Preceded by: Mahathir Mohamad
- Succeeded by: Ghafar Baba
- Constituency: Labis

Minister of Home Affairs
- In office 18 July 1981 – 16 March 1986
- Monarchs: Ahmad Shah; Iskandar
- Prime Minister: Mahathir Mohamad
- Deputy: Abdul Rahim Thamby Chik; Mohd Kassim Ahmed
- Preceded by: Ghazali Shafie
- Succeeded by: Mahathir Mohamad
- Constituency: Labis

Minister of Education
- In office 1976–1981
- Monarchs: Yahya Petra; Ahmad Shah
- Prime Minister: Hussein Onn
- Deputy: Chan Siang Sun; Salleh Jafaruddin; Mohammad Najib Abdul Razak
- Preceded by: Mahathir Mohamad
- Succeeded by: Sulaiman Daud
- Constituency: Labis

Minister of Primary Industries
- In office 1974–1976
- Monarchs: Abdul Halim; Yahya Petra
- Prime Minister: Abdul Razak Hussein; Hussein Onn
- Deputy: Paul Leong Khee Seong
- Preceded by: Abdul Taib Mahmud
- Succeeded by: Abdul Taib Mahmud
- Constituency: Labis

Deputy Minister of Commerce and Industry
- In office 1969–1974
- Monarchs: Ismail Nasiruddin; Abdul Halim
- Prime Minister: Tunku Abdul Rahman; Abdul Razak Hussein
- Minister: Khir Johari
- Constituency: Segamat Utara

Personal details
- Born: 18 April 1934 (age 92) Johor Bahru, Johor, British Malaya (now Malaysia)
- Party: United Malays National Organisation (UMNO) (until 1988)
- Other political affiliations: Barisan Nasional (BN)
- Spouse: Zulaikha Sheardin
- Alma mater: University of Malaya (BA); University of Sussex (MA)

Musa bin Hitam (Jawi: موسى بن هيتم; born 18 April 1934) is a Malaysian retired politician who served as the Deputy Prime Minister of Malaysia from 1981 to 1986, serving under Mahathir Mohamad. He was the chairman of Sime Darby Berhad.

== Early life and education ==
Musa bin Hitam was born on 18 April 1934 in Johor Bahru, British Malaya to a Malay father of Javanese descent and a mother of Chinese descent, who was adopted by and grew up in a Malay household at the age of five.

Musa continued his studies at the English College Johore Bahru. He received his bachelor's degree from the University of Malaya and his master's degree from the University of Sussex. He has since been awarded with various honours, including an Honorary Doctorate from the University of Sussex and an Honorary Doctorate from Ohio University (in 1980). Musa has held various posts at the international level at various times. These included being Chairman of the Commonwealth Parliamentary Association, Member of the Board of UNESCO, Leader of the Commonwealth Observer Delegation to the Malawi general elections and Member of the Commonwealth Ministers Delegations to Nigeria, Pakistan, Fiji and Gambia.

== Political career ==
In the 1960s, Musa briefly served as Acting Secretary-General of UMNO. He was later expelled from the party in the wake of the 13 May racial rioting for insubordination to Prime Minister and UMNO President Tunku Abdul Rahman. During his political exile, he obtained his Master's from the University of Sussex.

In 1971, he was readmitted to UMNO under the Tunku's successor, Abdul Razak Hussein. He rose quickly, becoming Deputy Whip of the Alliance coalition in Parliament, and was elected as a member of the UMNO Supreme Council. He was elected as a UMNO Vice-President in 1978.

When Mahathir Mohamad succeeded Hussein Onn as Prime Minister of Malaysia, he declared the election for the Deputy Presidency of UMNO open; and thus by extension the Deputy Prime Ministership — was open; he would not support any candidate. Musa Hitam faced Tengku Razaleigh Hamzah in 1981 the party election. Eventually, Musa won the election with 722 votes to Razaleigh's 517 votes, becoming the new Deputy President and Deputy Prime Minister. Razaleigh blamed himself for taking "a rather passive stance" and not having a campaign strategy.

== Government positions ==
Before becoming Malaysia's fifth Deputy Prime Minister and Minister of Home Affairs in 1981–1986, Musa held a number of key government posts, including

- Chairman of the Federal Land Development Authority (FELDA)
- Deputy Minister of Trade & Industry (1969–1974)
- Minister of Primary Industries (1974–1976) and
- Minister of Education (1976–1981)

In September 1981, Musa Hitam served as Acting Prime Minister when Mahathir Mohamad went on a two-week vacation with his family to Spain and Portugal.

Musa retired and was replaced by Ghafar Baba as Deputy Prime Minister in 1986.

== Post-political career ==
In 1987, Tengku Razaleigh challenged Mahathir Mohamad for the presidency of UMNO. Musa Hitam, who was then having a growing rift with Mahathir, resigned as Deputy Prime Minister, citing irreconcilable differences with Mahathir. He then joined Razaleigh's Team B as UMNO deputy president candidate. In the election, Dr. Mahathir and his Team A managed to retain his position and power over the party. However, UMNO was split into two separate entities as Tengku Razaleigh was left unsatisfied with the result. The split forced the Malaysian court to declare UMNO as illegal. Shortly after the court ruling, Dr. Mahathir reestablished UMNO as UMNO Baru (New UMNO), though the new UMNO was badly weakened. Tengku Razaleigh at the same time went on his own path and found a new political party called Semangat 46 in 1989. The number 46 refers to the year UMNO was founded. Musa, however, decided to retire from politics and has not joined the fray since.

Between 1990 and 1991, he was Malaysia's Special Envoy to the United Nations, and since 1995 he has been the Prime Minister's Special Envoy to the Commonwealth Ministerial Action Group (CMAG). Tan Sri Musa also led the Malaysian delegation to the UN Commission on Human Rights from 1993 to 1998 and was elected Chairman of the 52nd Session of the Commission in 1995. As a member of UMNO, Musa has held various positions within the party up to Deputy President until 1987.

He also served as the Chairman of Suhakam, the Malaysian Human Rights Commission from 1999 till 2002. In 2007, Musa became the chairman of Synergy Drive Berhad, the entity which arose out of the newly formed merger between Sime Darby, Guthrie, and Golden hope Plantations. He also serves on the International Advisory Council of the Brookings Doha Center. Musa is currently the Chairman of the World Islamic Economic Foundation.

On 25 September 2024, Tun Musa Hitam appointed as the Grand Chancellor of the Order of Loyalty to the Crown of Malaysia by Yang di-Pertuan Agong for three year-tenure, until 12 September 2027.

== Personal life ==
Musa was firstly married to the late Toh Puan Ines Maria Reyna, a Peruvian of Spanish descent, whom he first met at Lima, Peru in 1959 as an international student. They had 3 children: Mariana, Carlos Abdul Rashid and Rosana. Carlos was killed together with his wife Rozina Datuk Abu Bakar, a news anchor on TV3 during the Highland Towers collapse on 11 December 1993.

Musa has since remarried to Toh Puan Zulaikha Sheardin. His daughter Mariana died on 5 November 2022.

== Election results ==
Parliament of Malaysia
Year	Constituency	Candidate	Votes	Pct	Opponent(s)	Votes	Pct	Ballots cast	Majority	Turnout
1968	P103 Segamat Utara	Musa Hitam (UMNO)	9,485	62.34%	Lee Ah Meng (DAP)	5,731	37.66%	15,427	3,754	74.24%
1969	P103 Segamat Utara	Musa Hitam (UMNO)	10,212	61.18%	Tan Thian San (DAP)	6,480	38.82%	17,192	3,732	78.86%
1974	P099 Labis	Musa Hitam (UMNO)	Unopposed							
1978	P099 Labis	Musa Hitam (UMNO)	19,576	88.04%	Jamal Ahmad (PAS)	2,659	11.96%	23,773	16,917	78.45%
1982	P108 Panti	Musa Hitam (UMNO)	Unopposed							
1986	P128 Kota Tinggi	Musa Hitam (UMNO)	33,891	91.23%	Harun Embong (PAS)	3,258	8.77%	38,456	30,633	76.54%

== Honours ==
=== Honours of Malaysia ===
- Malaysia
  - Grand Commander of the Order of Loyalty to the Crown of Malaysia (SSM) – Tun (2006)
  - Commander of the Order of the Defender of the Realm (PMN) – Tan Sri (1994)
  - Recipient of the 16th Yang di-Pertuan Agong Installation Medal (2019)
- Johor
  - Knight Grand Commander of the Order of the Crown of Johor (SPMJ) – Dato' (1973)
  - Knight Grand Companion of the Order of Loyalty of Sultan Ismail of Johor (SSIJ) – Dato' (1977)
  - First Class of the Sultan Ibrahim Medal (PIS I) (1982)
- Malacca :
  - Knight Grand Commander of the Premier and Exalted Order of Malacca (DUNM) – Datuk Seri Utama (1982)
- Negeri Sembilan
  - Knight Grand Commander of the Order of Loyalty to Negeri Sembilan (SPNS) – Dato' Seri Utama (1982)
- Sabah
  - Grand Commander of the Order of Kinabalu (SPDK) – Datuk Seri Panglima (1984)
- Selangor
  - Knight Grand Commander of the Order of the Crown of Selangor (SPMS) – Dato' Seri (1982)

=== Foreign honours ===
- Japan
  - Grand Cordon of the Order of the Rising Sun (2018)
- South Korea
  - Gwanghwa Medal of the Order of Diplomatic Service Merit (1982)

== Notes and references ==
Political offices
Preceded by Mahathir Mohamad	Deputy Prime Minister of Malaysia; 1981–1986	Succeeded by Ghafar Baba
