= 2021 in Malaysia =

- Decades: 2000s; 2010s; 2020s
- See also: Other events of 2021; History of Malaysia • Timeline • Years

2021 in Malaysia is 64th anniversary of Malaysia's independence and 58th anniversary of its formation of Malaysia.

== Federal level ==
- Yang di-Pertuan Agong: Al-Sultan Abdullah Ri'ayatuddin Al-Mustafa Billah Shah of Pahang
- Raja Permaisuri Agong: Tunku Azizah Aminah Maimunah Iskandariah of Pahang
- Deputy Yang di-Pertuan Agong: Sultan Nazrin Muizzuddin Shah of Perak
- Prime Minister:
  - Muhyiddin Yassin (until 16 August; caretaker from 16 August until 21 August)
  - Ismail Sabri Yaakob (from 21 August)
- Deputy Prime Minister: Ismail Sabri Yaakob (from 7 July until 16 August)
- President of the Dewan Negara: Rais Yatim
- Speaker of the Dewan Rakyat: Azhar Azizan Harun
- Chief Justice: Tengku Maimun Tuan Mat

== State level ==
- Johor:
  - Sultan of Johor: Sultan Ibrahim
  - Menteri Besar of Johor: Hasni Mohammad
- Kedah:
  - Sultan of Kedah: Sultan Sallehuddin
  - Menteri Besar of Kedah: Muhammad Sanusi Md Nor
- Kelantan:
  - Sultan of Kelantan: Sultan Muhammad V
  - Menteri Besar of Kelantan: Ahmad Yakob
- Perlis:
  - Raja of Perlis: Tuanku Syed Sirajuddin
  - Menteri Besar of Perlis: Azlan Man
- Perak:
  - Sultan of Perak: Sultan Nazrin Muizzuddin Shah
  - Menteri Besar of Perak: Saarani Mohammad
- Pahang:
  - Sultan of Pahang: Tengku Hassanal Ibrahim Alam Shah (Regent)
  - Menteri Besar of Pahang: Wan Rosdy Wan Ismail
- Selangor:
  - Sultan of Selangor: Sultan Sharafuddin Idris Shah
  - Menteri Besar of Selangor: Amirudin Shari
- Terengganu:
  - Sultan of Terengganu: Sultan Mizan Zainal Abidin
  - Menteri Besar of Terengganu: Ahmad Samsuri Mokhtar
- Negeri Sembilan:
  - Yang di-Pertuan Besar of Negeri Sembilan: Tuanku Muhriz
  - Menteri Besar of Negeri Sembilan: Aminuddin Harun
- Penang:
  - Governor of Penang:
    - Tun Abdul Rahman Abbas (until 30 April)
    - Tun Ahmad Fuzi Abdul Razak (from 1 May)
  - Chief Minister of Penang: Chow Kon Yeow
- Malacca:
  - Governor of Malacca: Tun Mohd Ali Rustam
  - Chief Minister of Malacca: Sulaiman Md Ali
- Sarawak:
  - Governor of Sarawak: Tun Abdul Taib Mahmud
  - Chief Minister of Sarawak: Amar Abang Johari Abang Openg
- Sabah:
  - Governor of Sabah: Tun Juhar Mahiruddin
  - Chief Minister of Sabah: Hajiji Noor

== Events ==
=== January ===
- 1 January – The Kuala Lumpur–Singapore high-speed rail project is terminated after failing to reach an agreement on 31 December the previous year.
- 1 January – COVID-19 pandemic in Malaysia:
  - Senior Minister Ismail Sabri Yaakob announces that the Recovery Movement Control Order is extended until 31 March as cases remain high.
- 2 January – Nine drowned after 4WD vehicle rolled off ferry in Triso, Sarawak.
- 3 January – 2020–2021 Malaysian floods:
  - Heavy rain in Pahang and Johor, causing several flooding.
  - Flooding at East Coast Expressway Phase 1 disrupts road travel in east coast.
- 4 January – 2020–2021 Malaysian floods:
  - Floods occurred in 6 states, particularly in east coast region, more than 20,000 victims were evacuated.
  - Floods in Pahang has claimed first lives: a father has drowned and his son is lost.
  - Floods in Johor has claimed second victim after 20-year-old man's car swept away by strong currents.
- 4 January – Nora Anne Quoirin died by misadventure, coroner rules.
- 5 January
  - Annuar Musa is sacked as BN and UMNO secretary-general.
  - The Civil Aviation Authority of Malaysia suspends My Heli Club license for 6 months.
- 6 January – COVID-19 pandemic in Malaysia:
  - 85% of Malaysia's hospital beds for COVID-19 patients filled, as new daily cases hit high.
- 7 January – COVID-19 pandemic in Malaysia:
  - Malaysia records the highest COVID-19 tally in a day with 3,027 cases.
- 7 January
  - Ros rejects applications from Homeland Fighter's Party to be registered as political party.
  - Malaysian United Democratic Alliance (MUDA) confirms RoS rejects application to register as party.
- 8 January – 2020–2021 Malaysian floods:
  - Floods in Maran reported to be the worst in 20 years.
  - Flood situation worsens, almost 50,000 evacuated.
- 8 January – A petrol bomb was thrown at KWSP office in Miri, Sarawak. No deaths and injuries reported.
- 8 January – COVID-19 pandemic in Malaysia:
  - Malaysia records the highest COVID-19 deaths tally with 16 fatalities.
- 9 January – COVID-19 pandemic in Malaysia:
  - Member of Kelantan State Legislative Assembly Abd Aziz Yusoff and Gua Musang Youth UMNO chief were tested positive for COVID-19.
- 10 January – COVID-19 pandemic in Malaysia:
  - Sabah Agriculture and Fisheries Assistant Minister Hendrus Anding tested positive for COVID-19, joining Deputy Chief Minister Jeffrey Kitingan and Bingkor state assemblyman Robert Tawik on the list of those infected.
  - PMD Minister Mustapa Mohamed tests positive for COVID-19.
- 11 January – COVID-19 pandemic in Malaysia:
  - Women, Family and Community Development Minister Rina Harun tests positive for COVID-19.
  - Member of Kelantan State Legislative Assembly Mohd Syahbuddin Hashim and his wife were tested positive for COVID-19.
  - Ministry of Health and Pfizer sign manufacturing and supply agreement for COVID-19 vaccines.
  - Only 5 COVID-19 green zones in Peninsular Malaysia.
  - Prime Minister Muhyiddin Yassin announced that Movement Control Order restrictions would be re-introduced to the states of Selangor, Johor, Penang, Sabah, Malacca and the Federal Territories of Kuala Lumpur, Labuan, and Putrajaya between 13 until 26 January. It was dubbed as MCO 2.0 widely. These restrictions include.
- 12 January – COVID-19 pandemic in Malaysia:
  - Yang di-Pertuan Agong Al-Sultan Abdullah Ri'ayatuddin Al-Mustafa Billah Shah of Pahang declares state of emergency to curb the spread of COVID-19.
  - Home Affairs Minister Hamzah Zainuddin tests positive for COVID-19.
  - Malaysia records the highest COVID-19 tally in a day with 3,309 cases.
- 13 January – Fire at Andaman Hotel in Langkawi brought under control.
- 13 January – COVID-19 pandemic in Malaysia:
  - Communications and Multimedia Deputy Minister Zahidi Zainul Abidin tests positive for COVID-19.
- 14 January – 2020–2021 Malaysian floods:
  - More than 1800 flood victims in Sarawak were evacuated as of 1pm this afternoon.
- 14 January – COVID-19 pandemic in Malaysia:
  - Gua Musang MP Tengku Razaleigh Hamzah tests positive for COVID-19.
  - Malaysia records the highest COVID-19 tally in a day with 3,337 cases.
  - Former chief justice Salleh Abas tests positive for COVID-19.
  - Senator Yaakob Sapari tests positive for COVID-19.
- 15 January – COVID-19 pandemic in Malaysia:
  - Malaysia records 3,211 new cases, 1,710 recoveries, eight deaths.
  - Langkawi-Kuala Perlis ferry services suspended.
  - Prime Minister Muhyiddin Yassin announced that MCO 2.0 restrictions would be reimposed on Kelantan and Sibu, Sarawak between 16 and 29 January in response to a surge of cases.
- 15 January – Sultan Ibrahim of Johor agrees to rename 'Johor Cricket Academy Oval' in Mutiara Rini to 'Dato' Dr Harjit Singh Johor Cricket Academy Oval 'in conjunction with the late Dr Harjit.
- 15 January – 2020–2021 Malaysian floods:
  - 4,222 victims were evacuated in Sarawak.
- 16 January – COVID-19 pandemic in Malaysia:
  - Senator Idris Ahmad tests positive for COVID-19.
  - Malaysia records the highest COVID-19 tally in a day with 4,029 cases.
- 18 January – Prime Minister Muhyiddin Yassin announce new RM15 billion Permai stimulus package.
- 19 January – COVID-19 pandemic in Malaysia:
  - Padang Rengas MP Mohamed Nazri Abdul Aziz tests positive for COVID-19.
  - National Unity Minister Halimah Mohamed Sadique tests positive for COVID-19.
  - Former Menteri Besar of Terengganu Ahmad Said and his wife test positive for COVID-19.
- 20 January – COVID-19 pandemic in Malaysia:
  - Pasir Salak MP Tajuddin Abdul Rahman tests positive for COVID-19.
- 20 January
  - Cosmetics entrepreneur Nur Sajat pleads not guilty to cross-dressing.
  - Selangor announces RM73.87 mil aid package.
- 21 January – COVID-19 pandemic in Malaysia:
  - Several betting outlets in peninsular Malaysia and Sabah announced they were closing until 4 February to comply with the Government's new Movement Control Order.
  - Senior Defence Minister Ismail Sabri Yaakob announced that the Government would be allowing restaurants, food stalls and food deliveries in states under the MCO 2.0 to operate until 10 pm starting 22 January, easing a week-long rule of only allowing operations to run until 8 pm.
  - The Malaysian Government extended the country's MCO 2.0 restrictions in Selangor, Johor, Penang, Sabah, Malacca and the Federal Territories of Kuala Lumpur, Labuan and Putrajaya until 4 February due to a continuation of rising cases and deaths.
- 23 January – COVID-19 pandemic in Malaysia:
  - Terengganu Pas Commissioner tests positive for COVID-19.
- 24 January – COVID-19 pandemic in Malaysia:
  - 1 ERL employee tests positive for COVID-19.
  - Malaysians are among the 7 experts selected as members of the leading health bodies in Japan.
- 24 January – Aaron Chia – Soh Wooi Yik advanced to the Thai Open final.
- 25 January – COVID-19 pandemic in Malaysia:
  - EMCO in Taiping Prison & Staff Quarters.
- 25 January – AGC objects to MUDA's application to challenge RoS' decision to reject its registration.
- 26 January
  - Long-distance married couples allowed interstate travel from tomorrow.
  - Educational TV program starting 27 January.
- 29 January – COVID-19 pandemic in Malaysia:
  - Malaysia records the highest COVID-19 tally in a day with 5,725 cases.
- 30 January – COVID-19 pandemic in Malaysia:
  - Malaysia records the highest COVID-19 tally in a day with 5,728 cases.

=== February ===
- 1 February – COVID-19 pandemic in Malaysia:
  - Sri Ledang PLKN Camp will be the second PKRC in Johor.
- 2 February – Squash player Datuk Nicol David is named Greatest Athlete of All Time in The World.
- 2 February – COVID-19 pandemic in Malaysia:
  - Senior Minister Ismail Sabri Yaakob extended MCO 2.0 restrictions over all states except Sarawak from 5 until 18 February.
- 3 February – Isa Samad is sentenced to six years jail, fined RM15.4mil for graft.
- 4 February – COVID-19 pandemic in Malaysia:
  - Senior Minister Ismail Sabri Yaakob announced that three business activities night markets, hair salons, and car wash services would be allowed to operate under a strict operating procedure from 5 February onwards as Phase one together with some businesses.
- 9 February – COVID-19 pandemic in Malaysia:
  - Senior Minister Ismail Sabri Yaakob confirmed that dining in and retail shops are allowed to open, subject to rule of 5 per table; which is being implemented from 10 February, moving from Phase one to Phase two. However, the Phase two will only exist until July.
- 11 February – Gerakan joins Perikatan Nasional.
- 11 February – COVID-19 pandemic in Malaysia:
  - Senior Minister Ismail Sabri Yaakob confirmed that gym activities, golf, table tennis, badminton and tennis would be allowed from 12 February with social distancing and time restrictions.
- 13 February – COVID-19 pandemic in Malaysia:
  - The National Unity Ministry confirmed that non-Muslim places of worship would be allowed to start reopening from 12 February for the remainder of the Movement Control Order, which is scheduled to end on 18 February.
- 16 February COVID-19 pandemic in Malaysia:
  - Senior Minister Ismail Sabri Yaakob announced that the government would extend the MCO 2.0 for Selangor, Johor, Penang and the federal territories of Kuala Lumpur until 4 March 2021. Meanwhile, Terengganu, Negeri Sembilan, Kelantan, Perak, Kedah, Pahang, Sabah and Malacca as well as the federal territories of Labuan and Putrajaya transitioned back into the Conditional Movement Control Order (CMCO) from 19 February.
- 17 February
  - NTV7 temporarily ceases operation to give way for DidikTV.
  - 50 residents in the Pasir Mas town area were evacuated following a landslide.
- 17 February – COVID-19 pandemic in Malaysia:
  - Malaysia to receive Alpha ventilators worth RM2 million.
  - 2,720 COVID-19 cases, record high 5,718 discharged.
- 18 February
  - Pahang government allocates RM9.4 million for 18,726 flood victims.
  - High Court orders Rosmah Mansor to enter defence on all three graft charges.
- 21 February – COVID-19 pandemic in Malaysia:
  - First COVID-19 Vaccines arrived at KLIA.
- 21 February – Kuantan was officially declared as a city by Al-Sultan Abdullah Ri'ayatuddin Al-Mustafa Billah Shah of Pahang.
- 24 February – COVID-19 pandemic in Malaysia:
  - Muhyiddin Yassin and DG Noor Hisham Abdullah receives first dose of COVID-19 Vaccine.
- 25 February – COVID-19 pandemic in Malaysia:
  - Senior Minister Ismail Sabri Yaakob announced that the meetings, incentives, conferencing and exhibitions (MICE) sector in states under the Movement Control Order would be allowed to resume from 5 March.
- 26 February – COVID-19 pandemic in Malaysia:
  - Minister of defense Ismail Sabri Yaakob receives COVID-19 vaccine.
  - Sarawak CM Amar Abang Johari Abang Openg receives the first COVID-19 vaccines in Sarawak.
- 27 February – COVID-19 pandemic in Malaysia:
  - Sinovac Vaccines arrived.
- 27 February – New US ambassador Brian D. McFeeters arrives in Malaysia.
- 28 February – COVID-19 pandemic in Malaysia:
  - Chief Minister of Penang Chow Kon Yeow and Menteri Besar of Kedah Muhammad Sanusi Md Nor received COVID-19 Vaccine.
- 28 February – 2020–2021 Malaysian political crisis:
  - Two members of parliament from the opposition pledge to support Muhyiddin Yassin.
- 28 February – Prime Minister launch 'Pelan Pemerkasaan Kepimpinan Komuniti Rukun Tetangga'.

=== March ===
- 5 March – Selangor, Johor, Penang and Kuala Lumpur exited the Movement Control Order lockdown and entered the Conditional Movement Control Order (CMCO). This coincided with the launch of Malaysia National COVID-19 Immunisation Programme, which commenced the previous week.
- 10 March
  - Muhyiddin Yassin arrived in Abu Dhabi for a 2-day official visit.
  - High Court rules use of word Allah by non-Muslims allowed.
- 12 March – Deputy Chief Minister Datuk Amar Douglas Uggah Embas confirmed that the CMCO in Sarawak would be extended by a further two weeks from 16 March to 29 March.
- 16 March
  - CMCO in Negeri Sembilan, Perak and Kedah was changed to RMCO.
  - Malaysia signs the Convention of the International Association of Marine Assistance for Navigation.

=== April ===
- 1 April – State broadcaster Radio Televisyen Malaysia (RTM) celebrates its 75th anniversary, launching its new logo and sports channel and rebranding all of its local radio stations.
- 5 April – Malaysia's Court of Appeal began hearing a bid by former Prime Minister Mohammad Najib Abdul Razak to set aside his conviction on corruption charges in a case linked to a multi-billion dollar scandal at state fund 1MDB.
- 6 April – Mohammad Najib Abdul Razak has been served with a bankruptcy notice following his failure to pay the RM1.69 billion in additional income tax arrears to the Inland Revenue Board (IRB).
- 8 April – The CMCO in Sarawak was extended for two more weeks from 13 April until 26 April.
- 13 April – The Conditional MCO (CMCO) has been extended to 28 April in Selangor, Johor, Kelantan, Penang and W.P Kuala Lumpur. The Recovery MCO (RMCO) has been extended in Terengganu, Perlis, Negeri Sembilan (except Seremban district under CMCO), Perak, Kedah (except Kuala Muda district under CMCO), Pahang, Sabah, Melaka, W.P Labuan and W.P Putrajaya from 13 to 28 April.
- 14 April – Movement Control Order restrictions were reimposed in Kelantan from 16 April until 29 April, before being extended until 17 May.
- 26 April – The Sarawak Disaster Management Committee subsequently extended the CMCO until 10 May and then 17 May.

=== May ===
- 2 May – From 3 May, the Malaysian Government reimposed a two-week Movement Control Order in Selangor, Johor, Sarawak, Penang and Kuala Lumpur in response to a spike in COVID-19 cases. Schools were closed and social and religious activities were banned. While some economic activities were allowed, eateries can only provide takeaway services.
- 5 May
  - Government imposes tighter restrictions after rise of COVID-19 cases in Kuala Lumpur.
  - From 6 May until 17 May, the Malaysian Government re-imposed a two-week Movement Control Order in Selangor (except Sabak Bernam, Hulu Selangor, Kuala Selangor), in response to a spike in COVID-19 cases.
  - MCO restrictions were also reimposed on Terengganu (Besut), Johor (Johor Bahru, Kulai, Kota Tinggi), Perak (Larut Matang & Selama, Mukim Taiping) and Kuala Lumpur between 7 and 20 May 2021.
- 7 May – Malaysia bans travelers from Pakistan, Bangladesh, Sri Lanka and Nepal due to soaring number of COVID-19 cases in the region.
- 8 May
  - The government has also imposed a nationwide ban on inter-district travel from 10 May until 6 June.
  - Senior Minister (Security) Ismail Sabri Yaakob confirmed that the Malaysian Government would not implement a nationwide movement control order but will instead use targeted movement restrictions in response to local outbreaks. That same day, Ismail also confirmed that all interstate and inter-district travel without police approval would be banned nationwide from 10 May until 6 June.
- 10 May – Nationwide travel ban as COVID-19 cases soar.
- 10 May – COVID-19 pandemic in Malaysia:
  - Prime Minister Muhyiddin Yassin announced that a nationwide Movement Control Order lockdown would be reinstated from 12 May until 7 June. Dining in, social activities and shopping areas will be banned, although workers are allowed to go to work and come back home. Inter-district and inter-state travel are banned.
- 12 May – Nationwide MCO reintroduced for the 3rd time.
- 18 May – Mohammad Najib Abdul Razak's appeal hearing against his conviction and jail sentence for misappropriation of RM42mil in SRC International Sdn Bhd's funds at the Court of Appeal was completed after the court heard the arguments from both parties for 15 days.
- 22 May – A stricter form of the Movement Control Order lockdown was suggested by the government on 22 May. It was imposed on 25 May and lasts for two weeks. Under the updated form of the Movement Control Order, shoppers are only allowed to visit shopping malls and restaurants for only two hours. Shopping malls and eateries can only operate until 8 pm, and all sea and land transport services can only operate up to 50% of their capacity.
- 23 May
  - Sabah used a slightly different form of the Movement Control Order from 25 May onwards. Under its modified MCO 3.0, food and beverage outlets, grocery shops, self-service laundromats, and other businesses can only operate until 9 pm; all restaurants can only operate until 10 pm; customers visiting shopping malls, restaurants, grocery stores, hypermarkets, and mini-markets may be inside the premises for one hour; and said premises can only operate up to 50% of their capacity, with at least 200 square feet per customer.
  - That ended with the nationwide lockdown on 1 June.
- 24 May – The 1Malaysia Development Berhad (1MDB) trial involving Mohammad Najib Abdul Razak was postponed after the former prime minister developed hematoma from his eye surgery.
- 24 May – 2021 Kelana Jaya LRT collision:
  - 2 LRT trains collide near KLCC station, resulting in 213 people being injured.
- 25 May – RapidKL trains' frequency times were extended to 10 minutes during peak hours, and 30 minutes during normal hours.
- 28 May – Prime Minister Muhyiddin Yassin announced that a nationwide "total lockdown" or Full Movement Control Order (FMCO) will be imposed on all social and economic sectors in Malaysia from 1 June until 14 June. Under this lockdown, only essential economic and social services listed by the National Security Council will be allowed to operation. This will be followed by a second phase lasting four weeks from 14 June under which more sectors will be allowed to reopen, provided these activities do not involve large gatherings. The new master plan for exiting the lockdown will be announced in July.

=== June ===
- 1 June – The first phase of the total lockdown began.
- 11 June – Malaysia extends the "total lockdown" for another two weeks until 28 June due to a high number of cases.
- 12 June – the Malaysian Government extended the country's total lockdown (FMCO) by another two weeks until 28 June since daily new cases are still averaging over 5,000.
- 15 June – Prime Minister Muhyiddin Yassin unveils a four-stage National Recovery Plan with full reopening projected by November.
- 16 June
  - The Yang di-Pertuan Agong Al-Sultan Abdullah Ri'ayatuddin Al-Mustafa Billah Shah of Pahang advised the Parliament to reconvene as soon as possible.
  - Industries Unite (a coalition of 110 local trade groups) has criticised the National Recovery Plan as being unclear.
- 27 June
  - Malaysia extends "total lockdown" indefinitely until daily cases drop below 4,000 and targets on vaccination and intensive care unit usage are met.
  - the Malaysian government announced that country-wide lockdowns will be extended indefinitely until daily cases fall below 4,000. Restaurants are also allowed to operate from 6 am until 10 pm from 28 June onwards.
- 29 June – Due to the lockdown, more and more lower-income households are running out of food and income. Several activists organised the #benderaputih movement, calling the affected households to raise white flags or pieces of cloth to alert their neighbours and receive aid.

=== July ===
- 1 July – At the same time, people raised red flags to ask for aid for their pets, and black flags to protest the government's poor handling of the pandemic.
- 3 July – As Terengganu, Perlis, Kelantan, Perak, and Pahang have met the conditions needed, the government has allowed these states to move to Phase 2 of the lockdown on 5 July. This allows more businesses to be opened up, such as stationary and book shops, computer and telecommunication outlets, barberstores (only for haircuts), farmers' markets, and morning markets.
- 7 July
  - Ismail Sabri Yaakob becomes Malaysia's Deputy Prime Minister.
  - Penang entered into Phase 2 of the lockdown.
- 8 July – 2020–2021 Malaysian political crisis:
  - UMNO withdraws support for Muhyiddin, calling for a new Prime Minister until elections can be called. Later that day, Attorney General Idrus Harun said that Muhyiddin and his Cabinet can still exercise power as no clear evidence is shown that the team lost the majority.
  - Former Prime Minister Mahathir Mohamad reveals that the Homeland Fighters' Party is successfully registered, days after the Court ordered the Minister of Home Affairs Hamzah Zainudin to make a decision.
- 14 July – 2020–2021 Malaysian political crisis:
  - The Cabinet declares full support for Muhyiddin a week after UMNO's withdrawal.
- 23 July – 8 August – Athletes from Malaysia completed at the 2020 Summer Olympics in Tokyo, Japan, which was also postponed by a one year due to the COVID-19 pandemic.
- 24 July –Prime Minister Muhyiddin announced that the construction sector was allowed to operate under strict compliance to the SOP, along with the construction of roads and other public infrastructures. He also stated that all workers in the construction sector must be vaccinated.
- 26 July – 2021 Malaysian state of emergency:
  - De facto Law Minister Takiyuddin Hassan announced that the state of emergency will not be extended with all laws revoked as of 21 July, raising questions about the legality of the actions.
- 29 July – 2021 Malaysian state of emergency:
  - The Yang di-Pertuan Agong Al-Sultan Abdullah Ri'ayatuddin Al-Mustafa Billah Shah of Pahang issued a rebuke on the revocation of the state of emergency without consent and said that MPs were misled about it. As a result, opposition leader Anwar Ibrahim filed a motion of no confidence with Prime Minister Muhyiddin Yassin defending the procedures as in line with the Constitution.
- 31 July
  - A state of emergency is extended until 2 February 2022 in Sarawak to stop polls from taking place due to COVID-19.
  - Protests take place in Kuala Lumpur to demand Muhyiddin's resignation.
- 31 July – 2020 Summer Olympics in Tokyo, Japan:
  - Malaysian men's doubles, Aaron Chia and Soh Wooi Yik win bronze medal.

=== August ===
- 1 August – 2021 Malaysian state of emergency:
  - The state of emergency ends in all states except Sarawak.
- 2 August – 2020–2021 Malaysian political crisis:
  - Opposition members of the Dewan Rakyat gathered at Merdeka Square, calling for Muhyiddin's resignation while protesting the postponement of Parliament. This comes after members were blocked from entering Parliament by the police.
  - Media Prima Berhad rebrands its radio stations with Kool FM and One FM rebranded to Buletin FM and Eight FM respectively, while Fly FM and Hot FM remain unchanged. A new audio brand Audio+ is also launched with Ripple now known as Media Prima Audio.
- 3 August – 2020–2021 Malaysian political crisis:
  - UMNO president Ahmad Zahid Hamidi and 10 MPs announce withdrawal of support for Muhyiddin as Prime Minister. Earlier that day, Minister of Energy and Natural Resources Shamsul Anuar Nasarah announced his resignation.
- 3 August – Muhyiddin Yassin announced that a motion to repeal the emergency laws will be done next month given that the repeal procedure was incomplete.
- 4 August – 2020–2021 Malaysian political crisis:
  - Muhyiddin Yassin announced that he will prove his majority next month with resignation not on the cards. The opposition has rejected those assertions. Several days later, the confidence motion is scheduled on 7 September.
- 5 August – As each phase is based on the number of new cases, people requiring ICU treatment, and vaccination rates (by having two shots), it can be extended, or moved on to the next phase, whenever possible. From 7 August onwards, the number of new Covid cases with serious symptoms were used to indicate whether a state was ready to move up to Phases 2 and 3. Asymptomatic cases were no longer counted, as over 40 percent of the adult population had been vaccinated by the time the policy was changed.
- 6 August – 2020–2021 Malaysian political crisis:
  - Minister of Higher Education Noraini Ahmad announced her resignation. Separately, 31 Barisan Nasional members have pledged support for the Perikatan Nasional government until its legitimacy is proven in Parliament.
- 8 August – From 10 August onwards, fully-vaccinated people in Phase 2 and 3 states had more freedoms: they were required to wait for 14 days after their second dose (or 28 days for single-dose vaccines). Fully-vaccinated people were also able to be quarantined at home after returning, instead of being sent to a quarantine centre, provided they showed that they had no signs of infection within three days, and they presented their vaccination certificates
- 8 August – 2020 Summer Olympics in Tokyo, Japan:
  - Malaysian cyclist, Azizulhasni Awang win his first silver medal in track cycling.
- 8 August – 2020 Summer Olympics in Tokyo, Japan officially ends with Malaysia getting 1 silver and 1 bronze medal.
- 13 August – A shooting took place at the Royal Malaysian Air Force camp in Kota Samarahan, Sarawak, killing four personnel including the shooter.
- 13 August – 2020–2021 Malaysian political crisis:
  - Muhyiddin Yassin announced a series of concessions to pass a confidence motion by two-thirds, including two term limits for the prime minister, introducing an anti-party hopping bill in Parliament, balanced parliamentary committees, allowing 18-year-olds to vote, a general election by July 2022, among others. The proposals are rejected by several parties.
- 16 August – 2020–2021 Malaysian political crisis:
  - Prime Minister Muhyiddin Yassin and his cabinet has resign, will remain as caretaker prime minister before new Prime Minister is appointed.
- 20 August – 2020–2021 Malaysian political crisis:
  - Conference of Rulers met to discuss the appointment of new and 9th Prime Minister. After it, Vice-President of the United Malays National Organisation (UMNO) and Member of Parliament for Bera Ismail Sabri Yaakob was announced by Istana Negara, Jalan Tuanku Abdul Halim, Kuala Lumpur, Malaysia through a statement as the 9th Prime Minister.
- 21 August – 2020–2021 Malaysian political crisis:
  - Ismail Sabri Yaakob is sworn in as the 9th Prime Minister at Istana Negara, Jalan Tuanku Abdul Halim, Kuala Lumpur, Malaysia at 2.30 pm and officially marks the start of his term as Prime Minister and the end of Muhyiddin Yassin's term as caretaker Prime Minister.
- 24 August – 5 September – Athletes from Malaysia completed at the 2020 Summer Paralympics in Tokyo, Japan, which was also postponed by a one year due to the COVID-19 pandemic.
- 27 August – 2020–2021 Malaysian political crisis:
  - Prime Minister Ismail Sabri Yaakob formed his first cabinet with most of them retained from the previous cabinet Muhyiddin Yassin. The swearing-in took place 3 days later at 2.30 pm.
- 28 August – The 2020 Summer Paralympics in Tokyo, Japan:
  - Bonnie Bunyau Gustin wins first gold medal for Malaysia in the Men's 72 kg Powerlifting.
- 30 August – The 2020 Summer Paralympics in Tokyo, Japan:
  - Jong Yee Khie wins first silver medal for Malaysia in the Men's 107 kg Powerlifting.

=== September ===
- 1 September – The 2020 Summer Paralympics in Tokyo, Japan:
  - Chew Wei Lun wins second silver medal for Malaysia in the Mixed individual BC1 in Boccia.
- 4 September – The 2020 Summer Paralympics in Tokyo, Japan:
  - Cheah Liek Hou wins the second gold medal for Malaysia in the Men's Singles SU5 in Badminton.
  - Abdul Latif Romly wins third gold medal for Malaysia in the Men's Long jump T20 in Athletics.
- 5 September – 2020 Summer Paralympics in Tokyo, Japan officially ends with Malaysia getting 3 gold and 2 silver medals.
- 9 September – In a landmark ruling, the Kuala Lumpur High Court rules that Malaysian mums with a foreign spouse can now automatically pass Malaysian citizenship to children born outside Malaysia, saying that the law on citizenship must be read with Article 8 of the Constitution; which prohibits gender discrimination. The Government appeals the ruling four days later.
- 10 September – 2020–2021 Malaysian political crisis:
  - The cabinet agreed to implement key reforms to parliamentary and governmental reforms. The opposition announced its acceptance the following day.
- 12 September – 2020–2021 Malaysian political crisis:
  - The government and opposition reach an agreement to sign a Memorandum of Understanding (MoU) on bipartisan cooperation and reforms.
- 13 September – 2020–2021 Malaysian political crisis:
  - The MoU is signed with six key areas covered in the agreement, and elections not expected before 31 July 2022 at the earliest.
- 14 September – As around 66% of the country's population were vaccinated, and to make them more easier for the people to understand and follow, the government reduced the number of SOPs from 181 to just 10 in two weeks from 14 September.
- 21 September – From 1 October, Genting Highlands, Melaka, and Tioman Island will have their own travel bubbles and get reopened for tourists.
- 23 September – Petrol stations, restaurants, eateries, and convenience stores were allowed to operate from 6am to 12 midnight, to aid the economic recovery of the country. Prime Minister Ismail Sabri Yaakob also announced that when 90% of Malaysia's population had been fully-vaccinated, interstate travel will be allowed again.
- 24 September – The government planned to permit interstate travel within three weeks in early October, which would be when 90% of the adult population will have been fully-vaccinated. Home Minister Hamzah Zainudin also announced that foreign tourists will be allowed against when the country enters the endemic phase of the COVID-19 outbreak.
- 26 September – Theme parks across the country are planned to be reopened on November, when 90% of Malaysia's adult population will be fully-vaccinated.
- 27 September – Husbands were allowed to accompany mothers who were in labour, if they were fully-vaccinated. Muhyiddin Yassin, who headed the National Recovery Council, also announced that State Recovery Councils were set up in each state in Malaysia.
- 29 September – States under Phases 2 and 3 were also permitted to hold state and private functions, such as opening ceremonies and workshops, on the condition that all the guests were vaccinated and the number of people present were less than 50% of the venue's capacity. People who were not vaccinated were required to do saliva tests, or self-tests before the host or medical practitioners to check if they had the virus or not. Sports spectators and supporters were allowed to attend sports games or recreational venues, but they were not allowed to eat or drink.
- 30 September – From 4 October, immediate family members were also allowed to accompany mothers or relatives who were giving birth.

=== October ===
- 15 October
  - 1MDB obtained permission from the High Court in Kuala Lumpur to serve its writ of summons against six parties, including two overseas banking firms.
  - Higher learning institutions were allowed to reopen.
- 20 October – A Malaysian is appointed as the first urology professor in the University of Cambridge.
- 31 October – Schools in Kelantan and Kedah were allowed to reopen; and on 1 November, schools in Perak, Sabah and Penang were allowed to reopen.

=== November ===
- 16 November – A Royal Malaysian Air Force Hawk 108 fighter jet crashes, killing one and injuring another.
- 17 November – Health Minister Khairy Jamaluddin has assured that he's keeping a close eye on Mohammad Najib Abdul Razak's campaigning in the Malacca polls, after the former prime minister was accused of repeatedly violating COVID-19 standard operating procedures (SOPs).
- 18 November – Former prime minister Mahathir Mohamad questioned the RM100 million house to be built for another former prime minister Mohammad Najib Abdul Razak despite the latter's conviction of criminal charges and pending jail sentence. Speaking in the Dewan Rakyat, Mahathir said Najib was a convict who had been found guilty and sentenced to 12 years in jail and fined RM210 million in relation to funds from former 1MDB unit SRC International, but he has not been sent to jail and not paid the fine.
- 19 November – Minister in the Prime Minister's Department (Parliament and Law) Wan Junaidi Tuanku Jaafar has revealed that the government had agreed in principle to grant former prime minister Mohammad Najib Abdul Razak his request for land and housing reportedly valued at RM100 million.
- 20 November – 2021 Malacca state election:
  - Barisan Nasional retained control of the state by winning 21 seats.
- 22 November – Opposition leader Anwar Ibrahim said the cabinet must explain why it had so easily agreed in principle to former prime minister Mohammad Najib Abdul Razak's request for a property valued at RM100 million.
- 23 November – Beau Willimon, the creator of the US-version of acclaimed political thriller TV series ‘House of Cards’, is set to create a new series on Jho Low and the 1MDB saga.
- 24 November – The Court of Appeal maintained 8 December for its decision concerning Mohammad Najib Abdul Razak's appeal to quash his conviction and sentencing in the RM42 million SRC International corruption case.

=== December ===
- 1 December
  - The new Kuala Lumpur Air Traffic Control Centre is launched to raise standards in aviation safety and improve capacity for the Kuala Lumpur International Airport.
  - The Federal Court rules 2–1 that Muslim individuals cannot be a party to a dispute involving a non-Muslim married couple in the civil court, although the law applies to converts.
  - Prime Minister Ismail Sabri Yaakob declares 3 December as an annual Malaysia Batik Day.
- 2 December – The MRL East Coast Rail link will run through its original Section C alignment in Selangor after the Selangor state government agreed. Agreements are signed to formalise the alignment.
- 3 December – Official opening of Pavilion Bukit Jalil in Bukit Jalil, Kuala Lumpur, Malaysia by Malton Group, which had also constructed the Pavilion Kuala Lumpur.
- 7 December – The Court of Appeal has sternly reminded former prime minister Mohammad Najib Abdul Razak that it is a court of law and not a coffee shop.
- 8 December
  - The Court of Appeal has upheld the conviction and sentence of former prime minister Mohammad Najib Abdul Razak in the SRC International Sdn Bhd case, where Najib was found guilty of misappropriation RM42mil from the company's coffers.
  - The Court of Appeal said Najib's alleged receipt of a donation from the Saudi royal family was untenable evidence in his trial for misappropriating RM42 million from SRC International Sdn Bhd.
- 10 December – UMNO has filed an application for a stay of proceedings in a suit against it by SRC International Sdn Bhd for allegedly receiving a misappropriated sum of RM16 million from the company.
- 14 December
  - Constitutional amendments restoring Sabah and Sarawak as equal partners with Malaya are passed in Parliament unanimously with 199 in favour, and 21 absent.
  - The High Court orders Malaysian United Democratic Alliance (MUDA) registered within the next 14 days.
  - The Sessions Court in Kuala Lumpur proceeded with the corruption trial involving former chief minister of Penang Lim Guan Eng in connection with the Penang undersea tunnel project, although the accused was not in court. Lim's counsel, Gobind Singh Deo, informed the court that his client could not appear in court as he had been admitted to the National Heart Institute (IJN).
- 15 December – Laws on allowing people aged 18 and above to vote and automatic voter registration take effect.
- 17 December – 2021 Malaysian floods:
  - Klang Valley (Port Klang, Klang, Setia Alam, Puncak Alam, Kota Kemuning, Shah Alam, Kuala Lumpur, Ampang, Cheras, Hulu Langat, Puchong, Dengkil) hit by a worst flash floods ever seen in 50 years due to Tropical Depression 29W. Other reports include Lubok Cina, Kuantan, Bentong, Gua Musang, Kuala Linggi, Seremban, Teluk Intan experienced the flash flood as well.
- 18 December – 2021 Sarawak state election:
  - Gabungan Parti Sarawak (formerly Sarawak Barisan Nasional) retained control of the state by winning 76 seats.
- 22 December – The Court of Appeal unanimously dismisses the Government's application to suspend giving citizenship to children born overseas to Malaysian mums.
- 23 December – Sedenak will be developed as part of Iskandar Malaysia, making that area the sixth flagship zone. It will house agrotechnology, hi-tech, research and development and low-carbon industries.
- 31 December – Former health minister Dzulkefly Ahmad has filed a defamation suit against former prime minister Mohammad Najib Abdul Razak following his allegations of nepotism and cronyism. Dzulkefly filed a statement of claim at Kuala Lumpur High Court, providing an 24 August 2020, Facebook post by Najib together with a Sinar Harian article dated 28 January 2019, as key evidence.

== National Day and Malaysia Day ==
=== Theme ===
Malaysia Prihatin (Concerned Malaysia)

=== National Day parade ===
National Heroes Square, Putrajaya

=== Malaysia Day celebration ===
Sabah International Convention Centre, Kota Kinabalu, Sabah

== Sports ==
=== 2020 Summer Olympics – Tokyo, Japan ===
- Badminton - Men's Doubles:
  - Aaron Chia and Soh Wooi Yik win a Bronze medal.
- Cycling Track - Men's Keirin:
  - Mohd Azizulhasni Awang win a Silver medal.

=== 2020 Summer Paralympics – Tokyo, Japan ===
Malaysia managed to achieve this target with three gold medals in the 2020 Summer Paralympics.

- Powerlifting – Men's 72 kg
  - Bonnie Bunyau Gustin win a Gold medal.
- Powerlifting – Men's 107 kg
  - Jong Yee Khie win a Silver medal.
- Boccia – Mixed individual BC1
  - Chew Wei Lun win a Silver medal.
- Badminton – Men's Singles SU5
  - Cheah Liek Hou win a Gold medal.
- Athletics – Men's Long jump T20
  - Abdul Latif Romly win a Gold medal.

== Deaths ==
=== January ===
- 4 January – Nora Anne Quoirin, Misadventure, coroner rules.
- 10 January – Mustaffa Mohammad, Former Minister of Social Welfare and Deputy Minister of Works.
- 16 January – Salleh Abas, 6th Lord President of Malaysia and Malaysian judge.

=== February ===
- 3 February
  - Jamali Shadat, Comedian.
  - Ismail Kijo, Former Member of Selangor State Legislative Assembly for Lembah Jaya.
- 9 February – Ujang Mormin, World War II veteran Private and the last surviving soldier Battle of Pasir Panjang.
- 11 February – Abu Sujak Mahmud, Former mayor of Shah Alam and Deputy Menteri Besar of Selangor.

=== March ===
- 6 March – Abdul Ghani Gilong, Former minister and Sabah veteran politician.
- 15 March – Chai Kim Sen, Former Senator.
- 31 March – Adam Jaafar, Fondly known as 'Prebet Adam', an army private who killed 1 person and wounded 2 others in 1987 shooting rampage incident with an M16 rifle in Chow Kit.

=== April ===
- 30 April – Md Yusnan Yusof, Member of Kelantan State Legislative Assembly for Melor (2013–2020).

=== May ===
- 8 May – Low Yow Chuan, A real estate, property developer and patriarch of Low Yat Group.
- 14 May – Haziq Kamaruddin, Sport archer and Olympian.
- 15 May – Lim Heng Chek, Former swimmer and Olympian.
- 20 May – Rizuan Abdul Hamid, Former Senator and UMNO Deputy Permanent Chairman.
- 26 May – Ramassuntran Rengan, Actor and Comedian.
- 30 May – Harussani Zakaria, Mufti of Perak.

=== June ===
- 1 June
  - Lim Kok Wing, Founder of Limkokwing University of Creative Technology.
  - Hsing Yin Shean, Former Member of Parliament for Tanjong Aru (1986–1990).
- 7 June – Abd Rahman Yusof, Former Member of Parliament for Kemaman (1999–2004).
- 10 June – Rajemah Sheikh Ahmad, Former Malaysian athlete.
- 11 June – Husin Din, Former Member of Perak State Legislative Assembly for Selinsing.
- 16 June – Karnail Singh Nijhar, Former Member of Parliament for Subang (1999–2008).

=== July ===
- 7 July – Mohd Ghazali Che Mat, 8th Chief of Defence Forces.
- 13 July – Kumutha Raman, Johor DHPP PAS chief.
- 18 July – Leong Chee Woh, Former Malaysian Police.
- 22 July – Zabariah Abdul Wahab, former Member of Penang State Legislative Assembly for Bertam.

=== August ===
- 9 August – Siti Sarah, Singer and Actress.
- 21 August – Raja Noor Jan Shah Raja Tuah, businessman and claimant to defunct Sultan of Melaka throne.
- 24 August – Mohd Ghazali Mohd Seth, 7th Chief of the Defence Forces.
- 28 August – Ahmad Sarji Abdul Hamid, Former Chief Secretary to the Government.
- 29 August – Lajim Ukin, Former Deputy Chief Minister of Sabah, Federal Deputy Minister and Member of Parliament for Beaufort.
- 30 August – Sakaran Dandai, 8th Governor of Sabah, Deputy Chief Minister of Sabah and Member of Parliament for Semporna.

=== September ===
- 10 September – Gapar Gurrohu, former Deputy President of the Dewan Negara.
- 11 September – Mohd Zaman Khan, former Bukit Aman Criminal Investigation Department (CID) director and Director-General of the Malaysian Prisons Department (1994–1997).
- 19 September – Nilwan Kabang, Former Member of the Sabah State Legislative Assembly for Kunak.

=== October ===
- 3 October – Zolkples Embong, Former National Sports Council (NSC) director-general.
- 24 October – Mamat Khalid, Screenwriter and Film Director.
- 26 October – Guan Dee Koh Hoi, Deputy Minister of Tourism, Arts and Culture (2020–2021) and Secretary-General of the Homeland Solidarity Party.
- 27 October – Ahmad Kamal Abdullah (Kemala), Malaysian National Laureate.
- 31 October – James Jemut Masing, Sarawak Deputy Chief Minister and Member of the Sarawak State Legislative Assembly for Baleh.

=== November ===
- 5 November – Muslifah Zulkifli, Former national woman sports shooter.
- 17 November – Abdul Ghafar Atan, Former Member of Malacca State Legislative Assembly for Gadek (2004–2013) and Asahan (2013–2021).

=== December ===
- 4 December – Sabbaruddin Chik, Former Minister of Culture, Arts and Tourism.
- 21 December – Osman Sapian, 16th Menteri Besar of Johor.

== See also ==
- 2021
- 2020 in Malaysia | 2022 in Malaysia
- History of Malaysia
