= 2020 in Malaysia =

- Decades: 2000s; 2010s; 2020s
- See also: Other events of 2020; History of Malaysia • Timeline • Years

2020 in Malaysia is 63rd anniversary of Malaysia's independence and 57th anniversary of its formation of Malaysia.

== Federal level ==
- Yang di-Pertuan Agong: Al-Sultan Abdullah Ri'ayatuddin Al-Mustafa Billah Shah of Pahang
- Raja Permaisuri Agong: Tunku Azizah Aminah Maimunah Iskandariah of Pahang
- Deputy Yang di-Pertuan Agong: Sultan Nazrin Muizzuddin Shah of Perak
- Prime Minister:
  - Mahathir Mohamad (until 24 February; interim from 24 February until 1 March)
  - Muhyiddin Yassin (from 1 March)
- Deputy Prime Minister: Wan Azizah Wan Ismail (until 24 February)
- President of the Dewan Negara:
  - Vigneswaran Sanasee (until 22 June)
  - Rais Yatim (from 2 September)
- Speaker of the Dewan Rakyat:
  - Mohamad Ariff Md Yusof (until 13 July)
  - Azhar Azizan Harun (from 13 July)
- Chief Justice: Tengku Maimun Tuan Mat

== State level ==
- Johor:
  - Sultan of Johor: Sultan Ibrahim
  - Menteri Besar of Johor:
    - Sahruddin Jamal (until 27 February)
    - Hasni Mohammad (from 28 February)
- Kedah:
  - Sultan of Kedah: Sultan Sallehuddin
  - Menteri Besar of Kedah:
    - Mukhriz Mahathir (until 17 May)
    - Muhammad Sanusi Md Nor (from 17 May)
- Kelantan:
  - Sultan of Kelantan: Sultan Muhammad V
  - Menteri Besar of Kelantan: Ahmad Yakob
- Perlis:
  - Raja of Perlis: Tuanku Syed Sirajuddin
  - Menteri Besar of Perlis: Azlan Man
- Perak:
  - Sultan of Perak: Sultan Nazrin Muizzuddin Shah
  - Menteri Besar of Perak:
    - Ahmad Faizal Azumu (until 5 December)
    - Saarani Mohammad (from 10 December)
- Pahang:
  - Sultan of Pahang: Tengku Hassanal Ibrahim Alam Shah (Regent)
  - Menteri Besar of Pahang: Wan Rosdy Wan Ismail
- Selangor:
  - Sultan of Selangor: Sultan Sharafuddin Idris Shah
  - Menteri Besar of Selangor: Amirudin Shari
- Terengganu:
  - Sultan of Terengganu: Sultan Mizan Zainal Abidin
  - Menteri Besar of Terengganu: Ahmad Samsuri Mokhtar
- Negeri Sembilan:
  - Yang di-Pertuan Besar of Negeri Sembilan: Tuanku Muhriz
  - Menteri Besar of Negeri Sembilan: Aminuddin Harun
- Penang:
  - Governor of Penang: Tun Abdul Rahman Abbas
  - Chief Minister of Penang: Chow Kon Yeow
- Malacca:
  - Governor of Malacca:
    - Tun Mohd Khalil Yaakob (until 4 June)
    - Tun Mohd Ali Rustam (from 4 June)
  - Chief Minister of Malacca:
    - Adly Zahari (until 9 March)
    - Sulaiman Md Ali (from 9 March)
- Sarawak:
  - Governor of Sarawak: Tun Abdul Taib Mahmud
  - Chief Minister of Sarawak: Amar Abang Johari Abang Openg
- Sabah:
  - Governor of Sabah: Tun Juhar Mahiruddin
  - Chief Minister of Sabah:
    - Mohd Shafie Apdal (until 29 September)
    - Hajiji Noor (from 29 September)

== Events ==
=== January ===
- 1 January
  - Smoking ban officially takes place after a year-long grace period last year.
  - Visit Malaysia Year 2020 officially begins.
- 3 January – Maszlee Malik resigns as Minister of Education.
- 7–12 January – 2020 Malaysia Badminton Masters.
- 8 January – The MACC releases nine phone audio recordings received about a week earlier, recorded between 5 January to 29 July 2016, totaling about 45 minutes, revealing former prime minister Mohammad Najib Abdul Razak's attempts to cover up investigations into the 1MDB scandal, which MACC chief Latheefa Koya described as "shocking, as there are attempts at cover-ups and subversion of justice". One of the audio recordings featured a conversation between Najib and his wife Rosmah Mansor, who sounded upset at Najib's mishandling on the scandal. In another audio recording, Najib was seeking help from United Arab Emirates Crown Prince Mohammed bin Zayed Al Nahyan to help clear Najib's stepson, Riza Aziz's involvement in the scandal.
- 8 January – Former prime minister Mohammad Najib Abdul Razak is in for nearly a full year of court appearances, after the High Court fixed further hearing dates from February until October for his corruption trial involving 25 charges over the 1MDB scandal.
- 13 January – Japanese national badminton player, Kento Momota was injured in an accident early in the morning on his way to airport after competed at the 2020 Malaysia Masters when the van he was on hit the back of the lorry on Maju Expressway in which the driver was killed.
- 18 January – 2020 Kimanis by-election:
  - It was won by Mohamad Alamin a Barisan Nasional candidate from component party United Malays National Organisation (UMNO), replacing original member of parliament Anifah Aman whose election result was disqualified.
- 20 January – The Thai Peace Dialogue Panel, led by General Wanlop Rugsanaoh, met with Barisan Revolusi Nasional representative Anas Abdulrahman in Kuala Lumpur, in what was described as "the first round of official peace dialogue" by BNR official Abdul Aziz Jabal.
- 25 January – COVID-19 pandemic in Malaysia:
  - The Malaysian government confirmed the first cases related to the COVID-19 pandemic in Malaysia. The cases include three Chinese citizens from Singapore and subsequently quarantined at Sungai Buloh Hospital in Sungai Buloh, Selangor.

=== February ===
- 7–14 February – 2020 Tour de Langkawi.
- 21 February – A meeting was held by the presidential council of the PH coalition political party. The meeting is said to discuss the issue of handing over power from Tun Mahathir Mohamad to PKR President, Dato' Seri Anwar Ibrahim Anwar Ibrahim who is labeled as 'Prime Minister in waiting'. Mahathir initially stated that he would resign as Prime Minister after APEC Malaysia 2020.
- 22 February – Six-time Malaysian Super League champions Johor Darul Ta'zim (JDT) has officially moved into their new Sultan Ibrahim Stadium from Larkin Stadium, its previous venue. The new stadium was officiated by Johor Ruler Sultan Ibrahim Ibni Almarhum Sultan Iskandar on Saturday night.
- 23 February – 2020 Malaysian political crisis:
  - Some political parties held extraordinary meetings; UMNO at Putra World Trade Center (PWTC) in Kuala Lumpur, BERSATU at its headquarters at Menara Yayasan Selangor in Petaling, PAS and Umno in Janda Baik, Pahang, and Gabungan Parti Sarawak (GPS) in Kuala Lumpur. PKR Deputy President and Minister of Economic Affairs, Dato' Seri Mohamad Azmin Ali also held a meeting with several lawmakers from the party and 20 others at the Sheraton Hotel, Petaling.
  - The meeting became known as the Sheraton Move. Azmin and PKR allies went to Istana Negara in the evening to ask to see the Yang di-Pertuan Agong. Leaders from other political parties include Muhyiddin Yassin (BERSATU) who is also the Home Minister, Dato' Seri Dr Ahmad Zahid Hamidi (Umno), Dato' Seri Abang Johari Tun Openg (GPS), Dato' Seri Mohd Shafie Apdal (WARISAN) and Dato' Seri Seri Tuan Guru Hadi Awang (PAS) was also present.
  - Anwar is said to be aware of a new political movement involving a small group from Bersatu and PKR.
- 24 February – 2020 Malaysian political crisis:
  - Anwar Ibrahim and Deputy Prime Minister, Dato' Seri Dr Wan Azizah Wan Ismail who is also Anwar's wife as well as AMANAH President, Mohamad Sabu and DAP Secretary General, Lim Guan Eng, went to Mahathir's residence to hold a meeting to get an explanation about the previous day's incident.
  - Azmin and the Minister of Housing and Local Government, Zuraida Kamaruddin who is also the Vice President of PKR have been sacked from the PKR party. Azmin then announced that he would form an independent bloc in Parliament with Zuraida and 9 other MPs who decided to leave the party following their expulsion.
  - Mahathir Mohamad announced his resignation as Chairman of BERSATU. Following his resignation, the Yang di-Pertuan Agong, Al-Sultan Abdullah Ri'ayatuddin Al-Mustafa Billah Shah of Pahang accepted Mahathir's resignation and appointed him as Interim Prime Minister until a new Prime Minister is elected.
  - BERSATU and PKR's Azmin Ali left the coalition, which caused Pakatan Harapan lost majority as government. The cabinet was automatically dissolved by Tun Mahathir's resignation.
- 24 February – High Court judge Mohd Nazlan Ghazali has ruled that former prime minister Mohammad Najib Abdul Razak's defence team cannot compel Malaysian Anti-Corruption Commission (MACC) investigating officer (IO) Mohd Nasharudin Amir into being interviewed prior to him testifying in court.
- 25 February – 2020 Malaysian political crisis:
  - The first interview session held by Agong at Istana Negara; a total of 90 Members of Parliament randomly (not according to party) were called before the YDPA starting at 2:30 pm today. This interview session (2-3 minutes) between YDPA and Members of Parliament aims to determine support for certain parties to form a new government.
  - Umno and PAS, which are the first group to have interview session with Agong, stated that they support for Mahathir to continue as Prime Minister. UMNO Secretary General Tan Sri Annuar Musa said the basis of negotiations with Mahathir was that Umno and PAS would give their support to form an alternative coalition without DAP. On the other hand, both Umno and PAS declared support for the election to be held. Reports suggest that Mahathir is setting up a 'Unity Government' on the condition that the two sides cannot agree.
- 26 February – 2020 Malaysian political crisis:
  - The remaining 131 Members of Parliament will be summoned before the Yang di-Pertuan Agong today. (No former Minister or Deputy Minister will participate in this session). Tun Mahathir apologized for the political crisis and explained the reason for his resignation. He wants to create a government that is non-partisan (non-partisan) that is made up of individuals rather than political parties.
- 27 February – 2020 Malaysian political crisis:
  - Mahathir once again went to the palace to see the Yang di-Pertuan Agong. The purpose of the meeting is not known although there is much speculation that Mahathir discussed the formation of a new cabinet. At noon, Bersatu Secretary General, Dato' Marzuki Yahya, confirmed that Mahathir had withdrawn his resignation as Bersatu Chairman.
- 27 February – The High Court heard that businessman Jho Low had referred to former prime minister Mohammad Najib Abdul Razak as his "boss" when dealing with sums of money totalling RM170 million that were transferred in and out of Putrajaya Perdana Bhd’s (PPB) subsidiaries from SRC International Sdn Bhd.
- 28 February – 2020 Malaysian political crisis:
  - A meeting of the Council of Rulers was held in the morning at the Istana Negara to discuss political changes in the country, with state rulers or their crown princes present.
  - Speaker of the Dewan Rakyat, Dato' Mohamad Ariff Md Yusof denied Mahathir's announcement regarding the Special Session of Parliament. Ariff said that he had received a letter from Mahathir stating that the government had agreed to hold a special meeting on March 2 but this announcement did not comply with Meeting Regulation 11(3).
  - The Yang di-Pertuan Agong will call the leaders of political parties that have members of parliament to appear before him, to enable them to nominate a candidate for the position of Prime Minister to resolve the impasse. But the Agong is said to be unable to find a candidate who has the confidence of the majority of MPs to form a new government.
  - BERSATU then issued a statement that they announcing their support for BERSATU President, Muhyiddin Yassin as the Prime Minister candidate, supported by 26 BERSATU Members of Parliament and 10 others led by Azmin. More than 60 Members of Parliament from UMNO, PAS, MCA and MIC also announced their support for Muhyiddin.
  - Attorney General Tommy Thomas sent his resignation letter to the Interim Prime Minister, Tun Mahathir, but no reason was given.
- 29 February – 2020 Malaysian political crisis:
  - Bersatu Youth chief, Syed Saddiq Syed Abdul Rahman declared that he will not cooperate with those involved in corruption to form the government, he was referring to Umno.
  - The Pakatan Harapan Presidential Council held a meeting to discuss the current political situation in the country. After the meeting ended, they, then announced their support for Mahathir as the Prime Minister candidate, thus setting aside the coalition's stance supporting PKR President, Anwar Ibrahim as the Prime Minister candidate.
  - Before going to Istana Negara, Muhyiddin also announced that new coalition party consists of BERSATU, UMNO, MCA, MIC, PAS, GPS and STAR which is called Perikatan Nasional.
  - Istana Negara issued a statement that Muhyiddin Yassin had received the highest support from Members of Parliament and was approved to be appointed as the 8th Prime Minister of Malaysia by the Yang di-Pertuan Agong. He will be sworn in on the morning of tomorrow at the Istana Negara, Jalan Tuanku Abdul Halim, Kuala Lumpur, Malaysia.
  - That night, Mahathir released a list of 114 Members of Parliament who supported him and hoped the Agong would accept it. Among those MPs are Mahathir, his son Dato' Seri Mukhriz Mahathir and 4 Bersatu MPs, Pakatan Harapan MPs, WARISAN MPs including also, Dato' Seri Jeffrey Kitingan from STAR, Dato' Seri Maximus Ongkili from GBS, Baru Bian and Jonathan Yasin who were previously in Azmin's block .

=== March ===
- 1 March – Muhyiddin Yassin was sworn in as the 8th Prime Minister of Malaysia in front of the Yang di-Pertuan Agong at Istana Negara, Jalan Tuanku Abdul Halim, Kuala Lumpur, Malaysia.
- 3 March – The High Court dismissed the prosecution’s application to initiate contempt of court proceedings after former deputy prime minister Ahmad Zahid Hamidi made a public apology.
- 9 March – Prime Minister Muhyiddin Yassin formed his first cabinet, eight days after sworn in.
- 15 March – COVID-19 pandemic in Malaysia:
  - The positive cases of coronavirus increased from 242 to 428, with the highest record increase number at that time. Most of the infects are related to a religious event at a mosque in Kuala Lumpur.
- 16 March – COVID-19 pandemic in Malaysia:
  - Prime Minister Muhyiddin Yassin announces Malaysia will impose a nationwide partial lockdown (known as the Movement Control Order) from 18 until 31 March to contain the coronavirus pandemic.
- 17 March – COVID-19 pandemic in Malaysia:
  - First coronavirus related death case reported as two deaths recorded on that day.
- 18 March – Visit Malaysia Year 2020 has been cancelled due to coronavirus pandemic and the first day of movement control order.
- 25 March – Prime Minister Muhyiddin Yassin announces that movement control order be extended for another two weeks until 14 April.

=== April ===
- 10 April – Prime Minister Muhyiddin Yassin announces that movement control order be extended for another two weeks from 15 until 28 April.
- 23 April – Prime Minister Muhyiddin Yassin announces that movement control order be extended for another two weeks until 12 May.

=== May ===
- 1 May
  - Prime Minister Muhyiddin Yassin in his Labour Day speech announced a plan named the Conditional Movement Control Order (CMCO or Conditional MCO), a relaxation of regulations regarding the MCO, with its main goal was to reopen the national economy in a controlled manner. The CMCO was scheduled to start from 4 May.
  - However, the CMCO received mixed reactions among state governments around Malaysia. The states of Kedah, Kelantan, Pahang, Sabah and Sarawak decided to not implement the CMCO by 4 May, either to give way to discussions regarding the implications of reopening economic sections towards the future trend of Malaysia's pandemic or to secure the positive development of the pandemic. The governments of Selangor and Perak restricted some business sectors operating during the CMCO while Negeri Sembilan only allowed economic sectors to reopen. The government of Penang on the other hand had implemented a three-phase gradual reopening till 13 May.
- 10 May – Prime Minister Muhyiddin Yassin announces that Conditional Movement Control Order be extended for another four weeks until 9 June.
- 14 May – Pudu area in Kuala Lumpur comes under semi enhanced movement control order (SEMCO). Soldiers and police put up barbed wire fences at road exits. It is understood that besides Jalan Pudu, the affected roads are Jalan Kancil, Jalan Pasar, Jalan Landak, Lorong Brunei 2 and Lorong Brunei 3. Several busy commercial districts in the Klang Valley have been put under various lockdowns, including the enhanced movement control order (EMCO).

=== June ===
- 2 June – The High Court has fixed 27 July for the case management of Mohammad Najib Abdul Razak's money laundering case involving RM27 million of SRC International Sdn Bhd funds.
- 7 June – Prime Minister Muhyiddin Yassin announces that the Recovery Movement Control Order be extended from 10 June until 31 August.
- 21 June – Senior Minister Ismail Sabri Yaakob announced that couples whose marriage registration had been delayed as a result of the Movement Control Order could not complete the process at all permitted NGOs in the country including clan organisations, temples, churches, and religious bodies.
- 23 June – Malaysia leads a 171 nation initiative at the United Nations to support U.N. Secretary General António Guterras' appeal for a global ceasefire during the COVID-19 pandemic.
- 26 June – Senior Minister Ismail Sabri Yaakob announced that sectors under the purview of the Ministry of Tourism, Arts and Culture such as meetings, incentives, conventions and exhibitions, travel and trade fairs, as well as a spa, wellness and reflexology centres would be allowed to open from 1 July. However, tourism businesses are required to abide by social distancing measures, limit crowds to 200–250 people, check customers' temperatures, wear face masks, and provide hand sanitizer. While reflexology centres provided by the blind are allowed to reopen, only Malaysians can work in spas, wellness, and reflexology centres. Ismail Sabri also announced that tuition centres, special education schools and private schools would be allowed to operate soon.
- 29 June – It was reported that both government and private pre-schools, kindergartens, nurseries and daycare centres would resume operations from 1 July. Under the RMCO, a range of businesses and activities have been allowed to resume operations including spas, wellness and foot massage centres, cinemas, meetings, seminars, weddings, birthdays, and religious gatherings. Besides, swimming in public, hotel, condominium, gated community and private pools have also been allowed.

=== July ===
- 3 July – Religious Affairs Minister in the Prime Minister's Department Dr Zulkifli Mohamad Al-Bakri clarified that foreigners would not be allowed to attend congregational prayers at mosques and surau until the department had studied reports from the Federal Territories Islamic Religious Department regarding the situation. Zulkifli expressed hope that the situation would be resolved within a month or two.
- 10 July – Senior Minister Ismail Sabri Yaakob announced that family entertainment centres including game arcades, karaoke centres, indoor funfairs, edutainment centres for children, and kids' gymnasiums could resume operations from 15 July.
- 22 July – The High Court has ruled in favour of the Inland Revenue of Board (IRB) in a summary judgment by allowing it to collect tax arrears from former prime minister Mohammad Najib Abdul Razak for the amount of RM1.69 billion.
- 28 July – the High Court convicted former prime minister Mohammad Najib Abdul Razak on all seven counts of abuse of power, money laundering and criminal breach of trust, becoming the first Prime Minister of Malaysia to be convicted of corruption, and was sentenced to 12 years' imprisonment and fined RM210 million.
- 29 July – Former prime minister Mohammad Najib Abdul Razak has paid the additional RM1 million bail that he was required to post in his case involving RM42 million of former 1MDB unit SRC International Sdn Bhd’s funds.

=== August ===
- 26 August – Former transport minister Loke Siew Fook said he had pictures of Umno leaders including former prime minister Mohammad Najib Abdul Razak riding motorcycles without helmets. He said Najib had been wearing a songkok instead of a helmet while campaigning for the Slim by-election.
- 28 August – Prime Minister Muhyiddin Yassin announces that the Recovery Movement Control Order be extended from 1 September until 31 December.

=== September ===
- 14 September – Former prime minister Mohammad Najib Abdul Razak is listed on the Malaysian Anti-Corruption Commission (MACC) online database of corruption offenders convicted locally. His name at the top of the first page of the MACC Corruption Offenders Database.
- 24 September – High Court judge Mohd Nazlan Mohd Ghazali observed that former prime minister Mohammad Najib Abdul Razak had expressed no remorse for his actions, and that his explanation that he had used a part of the RM42 million stolen from SRC International Sdn Bhd for charitable purposes simply could not be justified.
- 26 September – 2020 Sabah state election:
  - Perikatan Nasional won the state election and formed government with Barisan Nasional and United Sabah Party and several allied independent politicians. The lack of strict standard operating procedures for the election and the return of voters and politicians from Sabah to Peninsular Malaysia had caused a significant influx of COVID-19 cases in Malaysia. Daily reported cases increased to three digit numbers in the following months. On 7 November, the Federal Government announced the implementation of a Conditional Movement Control Order in majority of states in the Peninsular and the state of Sabah due to the rising number of cases.

=== November ===
- 7 November – Senior Minister Ismail Sabri Yaakob announced that the Malaysian Government would be reinstating the CMCO throughout most of Peninsular Malaysia except Kelantan, Perlis, and Pahang between 9 November and 6 December 2020. Besides, CMCO measures for Sabah, Selangor, Kuala Lumpur, and Putrajaya, which were scheduled to end on 9 November were extended until 6 December. Under these new CMCO measures, all educational institutions, social and cultural activities will be required to cease but economic activities can continue under set standard operating procedures.
- 9 November – 2020 Malaysian floods
- 13 November – Senior Minister Ismail Sabri Yaakob announced that the Malaysian Government would allow three people from the same household per car, easing an earlier CMCO restriction limiting cars to just two people following a public backlash.
- 20 November – Senior Minister Ismail Sabri Yaakob approved a domestic travel bubble programme within green zones. He also announced the elimination of CMCO restrictions in the states of Terengganu, Johor, Kedah and Malacca with the exception of certain districts.

=== December ===
- 2 December – Former prime minister Mohammad Najib Abdul Razak has submitted 307 grounds in his petition of appeal on why he should be freed of the charges of misappropriating RM42 million in SRC International Sdn Bhd funds. Najib's lawyer Harvinderjit Singh confirmed that the petition was filed on 19 October and that it contained 307 grounds of appeal.
- 5 December
  - Senior Minister Ismail Sabri Yaakob confirmed that the Conditional Movement Control Order would end for most states except Sabah, Kuala Lumpur, most of Selangor, and parts of Johor, Negeri Sembilan, Kelantan and Perak; where the CMCO would be extended until 20 December.
  - Senior Minister Ismail Sabri Yaakob announced that the Government would allow unrestricted interstate travel across states and districts from 7 December with the exception of areas under an Enhanced Movement Control Order (EMCO), which will still require a police permit.
- 7 December – The National Security Council lifted the cap on the number of diners allowed to share tables at restaurants in areas under the Conditional Movement Control Order (CMCO) including Kuala Lumpur.
- 18 December – Senior Minister Ismail Sabri Yaakob extended the CMCO in Kuala Lumpur and much of Selangor with the exception of Sabak Bernam, Hulu Selangor, and Kuala Selangor from 21 December to 31 December 2020. In addition, the CMCO was extended in Sabah and several districts in Negeri Sembilan, Johor, Perak and Penang until 31 December. Meanwhile, the CMCO in certain districts of Kelantan and Kedah will revert to Recovery Movement Control Order on 20 December.
- 28 December – The National Security Council extended the CMCO in Kuala Lumpur and Selangor from 1 January until 14 January 2021 in response to a surge in cases and clusters in those areas.

== National Day and Malaysia Day ==
=== Theme ===
Malaysia Prihatin (Concerned Malaysia)

=== National Day parade ===
National Heroes Square, Putrajaya

=== Malaysia Day celebration ===
Sibu Indoor Stadium, Sibu, Sarawak

== Deaths ==
=== January ===
- 1 January – Peter Lo Sui Yin, 2nd Chief Minister of Sabah.

=== February ===
- 10 February – Abam Bocey, Comedian.
- 18 February – Ashraf Sinclair, Actor.
- 19 February – K. S. Maniam, Novelist.

=== March ===
- 18 March – Myanaliza Ruslee, Singer.

=== April ===
- 20 April – Farit Ismeth Emir, News anchor.

=== May ===
- 31 May – Tan Aik Mong, Badminton player.

=== August ===
- 15 August
  - Yusof Kelana, Director.
  - Abu Bakar Juah, Actor.

=== September ===
- 18 September – Dato' Awang anak Raweng, Scout and war hero.
- 20 September – Tengku Abdul Aziz, Brother of Tengku Razaleigh Hamzah and Father of Tengku Temenggong Kelantan.
- 21 September – Wan Mokhtar Ahmad, 10th Menteri Besar of Terengganu.

=== October ===
- 2 October – Liew Vui Keong, MP of Batu Sapi, Sabah.
- 15 October – Tengku Merjan, Mother of Tengku Temenggong Kelantan.
- 16 October – Abdul Aziz Shamsuddin, Former Minister of Rural and Regional Development.

=== November ===
- 14 November – Zaleha Ismail, Former National Unity and Community Development Minister.
- 16 November – Hasbullah Osman, MP of Gerik, Perak.
- 17 November – Manis Muka Mohd Darah, Member of Sabah State Legislative Assembly for Bugaya.

=== December ===
- 15 December – Ungku Abdul Aziz, Academician and economist.
- 17 December – Namat Abdullah, Former national footballer.
- 18 December – Rahah Mohamed Noah, Spouse of 2nd Prime Minister Abdul Razak Hussein (1970–1976) and the mother of 6th Prime Minister Mohammad Najib Abdul Razak (2009–2018).
- 24 December – Mohamad Aziz, Former Speaker of Johor State Legislative Assembly and former MP of Sri Gading, Johor.
- 26 December – Railey Jeffrey, 8th Deputy Minister of Works and Deputy Minister of Information.

== See also ==
- 2020
- 2019 in Malaysia | 2021 in Malaysia
- History of Malaysia
- List of Malaysian films of 2020
