= 2019 in Malaysia =

- Decades: 1990s; 2000s; 2010s; 2020s
- See also: Other events of 2019; History of Malaysia • Timeline • Years

2019 in Malaysia is 62nd anniversary of Malaysia's independence and 56th anniversary of its formation of Malaysia.

== Incumbents ==
=== Federal level ===
- Yang di-Pertuan Agong:
  - Sultan Muhammad V of Kelantan (until 6 January)
  - Al-Sultan Abdullah Ri'ayatuddin Al-Mustafa Billah Shah of Pahang (from 31 January)
- Raja Permaisuri Agong:
  - Vacant (until 6 January)
  - Tunku Azizah Aminah Maimunah Iskandariah of Pahang (from 31 January)
- Deputy Yang di-Pertuan Agong: Sultan Nazrin Muizzuddin Shah of Perak
- Prime Minister: Mahathir Mohamad
- Deputy Prime Minister: Wan Azizah Wan Ismail
- President of the Dewan Negara: Vigneswaran Sanasee
- Speaker of the Dewan Rakyat: Mohamad Ariff Md Yusof
- Chief Justice:
  - Richard Malanjum (until 12 April)
  - Tengku Maimun Tuan Mat (from 2 May)

=== State level ===
- Johor:
  - Sultan of Johor: Sultan Ibrahim
  - Menteri Besar of Johor:
    - Osman Sapian (until 14 April)
    - Sahruddin Jamal (from 14 April)
- Kedah:
  - Sultan of Kedah: Sultan Sallehuddin
  - Menteri Besar of Kedah: Mukhriz Mahathir
- Kelantan:
  - Sultan of Kelantan: Tengku Muhammad Faiz Petra (Regent until 6 January)
  - Menteri Besar of Kelantan: Ahmad Yakob
- Perlis:
  - Raja of Perlis: Tuanku Syed Sirajuddin
  - Menteri Besar of Perlis: Azlan Man
- Perak:
  - Sultan of Perak: Sultan Nazrin Muizzuddin Shah
  - Menteri Besar of Perak: Ahmad Faizal Azumu
- Pahang:
  - Sultan of Pahang:
    - Sultan Haji Ahmad Shah Al-Musta'in Billah (until 11 January)
    - Al-Sultan Abdullah Ri'ayatuddin Al-Mustafa Billah Shah (from 15 January)
    - Tengku Hassanal Ibrahim Alam Shah (Regent from 31 January)
  - Menteri Besar of Pahang: Wan Rosdy Wan Ismail
- Selangor:
  - Sultan of Selangor: Sultan Sharafuddin Idris Shah
  - Menteri Besar of Selangor: Amirudin Shari
- Terengganu:
  - Sultan of Terengganu: Sultan Mizan Zainal Abidin
  - Menteri Besar of Terengganu: Ahmad Samsuri Mokhtar
- Negeri Sembilan:
  - Yang di-Pertuan Besar of Negeri Sembilan: Tuanku Muhriz
  - Menteri Besar of Negeri Sembilan: Aminuddin Harun
- Penang:
  - Governor of Penang: Tun Abdul Rahman Abbas
  - Chief Minister of Penang: Chow Kon Yeow
- Malacca:
  - Governor of Malacca: Tun Mohd Khalil Yaakob
  - Chief Minister of Malacca: Adly Zahari
- Sarawak:
  - Governor of Sarawak: Tun Abdul Taib Mahmud
  - Chief Minister of Sarawak: Amar Abang Johari Abang Openg
- Sabah:
  - Governor of Sabah: Tun Juhar Mahiruddin
  - Chief Minister of Sabah: Mohd Shafie Apdal

== Events ==
=== January ===
- 1 January – Smoking ban was planned to take effect, however the grace period was extended twice throughout the year and the ban will only be implemented the following year.
- 6 January – Sultan Muhammad V of Kelantan stepped down as the 15th Yang di-Pertuan Agong.
- 11 January – Sultan Haji Ahmad Shah Al-Musta'in Billah abdicated with effect from 11 January 2019 (when it was Pahang's turn to provide the Agong) upon the amendment of the state's constitution.
- 15 January – The Tengku Mahkota of Pahang, Tengku Abdullah Ibni Tengku Ahmad Shah was proclaimed as the new Sultan of Pahang with the title Al-Sultan Abdullah Ri'ayatuddin Al-Mustafa Billah Shah.
- 20 January – Penang Bridge crash:
  - Two cars travelling mainland–bound collided, with one plunging into the Strait of Malacca.
  - A search operation was launched for the submerged car, and the victim was later found dead.
- 21 January – Thaipusam
- 24 January – The special Conference of Rulers is held in Istana Negara, Kuala Lumpur to elect the new 16th Yang di-Pertuan Agong. Al-Sultan Abdullah Ri'ayatuddin Al-Mustafa Billah Shah of Pahang is elected as the 16th Yang di-Pertuan Agong while Sultan Nazrin Muizzuddin Shah of Perak is elected as a Deputy Yang di-Pertuan Agong.
- 26 January– 2019 Cameron Highlands by-election:
  - It was won by Ramli Mohd Nor, a direct candidate representing Barisan Nasional. Upon his win, he joined the coalition's component party, United Malays National Organisation (UMNO).
- 28 January – Former prime minister Mohammad Najib Abdul Razak was charged in the Kuala Lumpur High Court on three additional charges involving money laundering totalling RM47 million five years ago.
- 29 January – Tunku Azizah Aminah Maimunah Iskandariah proclaimed as Tengku Ampuan of Pahang, a title reserved for the consort of the current ruler or sultan, of noble birth, as enshrined in the Pahang State Constitution. Her second son, Tengku Hassanal Ibrahim Alam Shah proclaimed as Tengku Mahkota (Crown prince) of Pahang.
- 31 January - The 16th Yang di-Pertuan Agong, Al-Sultan Abdullah Ri'ayatuddin Al-Mustafa Billah Shah of Pahang sworn-in, beginning his five-year term as Head of State.

=== February ===
- 5–6 February – Chinese New Year
- 18 February - The Billion Dollar Whale, which chronicles the 1MDB scandal, is billionaire Bill Gates' book of choice.

=== March ===
- 2 March – 2019 Semenyih by-election:
  - It was won by Zakaria Hanafi, Barisan Nasional's candidate from component party United Malays National Organisation (UMNO). The result meant that the political coalition got its seat back from the Pakatan Harapan coalition whose original member of parliament, Bakhtiar Mohd Nor died on 11 January 2019 at the age of 57 due to heart attack.
- 14 March – Opening of the IKEA Malaysia's fourth store in Batu Kawan, Penang.
- 17 March – Death of Sultanah Zanariah:
  - Sultanah Zanariah died. She was laid to rest next to grave of her late mother, Che Puan Hajah Fatimah at the Mahmoodiah Royal Mausoleum in Johor Bahru, Johor.
- 28 March – The High Court set 3 April at 2pm for the trial of former prime minister Mohammad Najib Abdul Razak’s SRC case.

=== April ===
- 1 April – Former prime minister Mohammad Najib Abdul Razak filed another bid (a judicial review application) against the Federal Court’s refusal to grant him an order to stay the trial of his SRC case.
- 9 April – Menteri Besar of Johor Osman Sapian has resigns.
- 10 April - A White Paper on FELDA is tabled in Parliament. It revealed losses and questionable deals, with cash assistance from the Government to help settlers.
- 13 April – 2019 Rantau by-election:
  - It was won by incumbent United Malays National Organisation (UMNO) state assemblyman, Mohamad Hasan representing Barisan Nasional after his original result was declared null and void, allowed him to retain his seat.
- 17 April – Prime Minister Mahathir Mohamad has been listed as one of Time Magazine’s 100 most influential people.
- 18 April – Prime Minister Mahathir Mohamad says Malaysia should be able to leverage on 5G technology within the next three years and catapult the national economy towards strong and sustainable growth.
- 19 April – Tengku Mahkota of Kelantan, Tengku Muhammad Faiz Petra marries Swedish citizen, Sofie Louise Johansson Petra.
- 24 April – Water supply system improvement works at Sungai Selangor Phase 2 (SSP2) Water Treatment Plant.

=== May ===
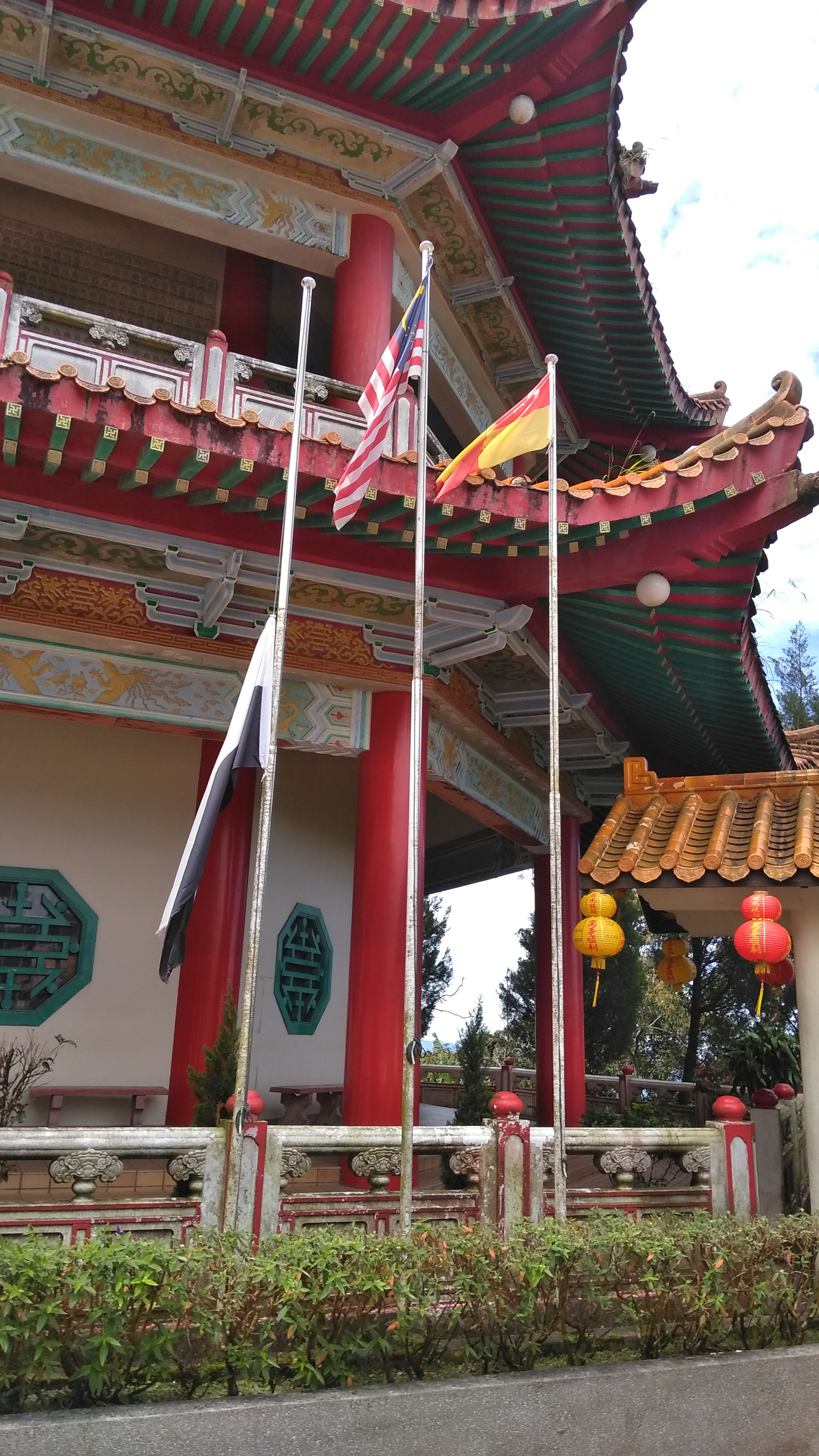
22 May – The flag of Pahang is flown at half-mast at the Chin Swee Caves Temple as a mark of respect to the late Sultan Haji Ahmad Shah Al-Musta'in Billah.

- 5 May – Fortune magazine has ranked Prime Minister Mahathir Mohamad the world’s 47th greatest leader.
- 10 May – State awards conferred upon former prime minister Mohammad Najib Abdul Razak and his wife Rosmah Mansor by Sultan of Selangor Sultan Sharafuddin Idris Shah have been suspended. Selangor state secretary Mohd Amin Ahmad Ahya said in a statement that the suspension follows the graft, criminal breach of trust and money laundering charges brought against both Najib and Rosmah.
- 11 May – 2019 Sandakan by-election:
  - It was won by Vivian Wong Shir Yee representing Democratic Action Party (DAP) of the Sabah Heritage Party, Pakatan Harapan and United Progressive Kinabalu Organisation alliance, replacing her father and original Member of Parliament Stephen Wong Tien Fatt who died of heart attack.
- 14 May – The Court of Appeal dismissed former deputy prime minister Ahmad Zahid Hamidi's appeal to have his impounded passport returned to perform umrah.
- 22 May – Death of Sultan Haji Ahmad Shah Al-Musta'in Billah:
  - Sultan Haji Ahmad Shah Al-Musta'in Billah, the 5th Sultan of Pahang and 7th Yang di-Pertuan Agong (1979–1984) died at age 88.
  - Sultan Haji Ahmad Shah Al-Musta'in Billah died at 8:50 am at the National Heart Institute, Kuala Lumpur.
  - He was laid to rest next to the grave of his the late wife, Tengku Ampuan Afzan at the Pahang Royal Mausoleum near Abu Bakar Royal Mosque in Pekan, Pahang.
  - The state of Pahang observed 40 days of mourning, and the flag of Pahang across the state were flown at half-mast, while all entertainment events for the next 3 days were cancelled.

=== June ===
- 5–6 June – Hari Raya Aidilfitri
- 13 June – Lee Chong Wei announces retirement.
- 17 June – Prime Minister Mahathir Mohamad in London, United Kingdom said Malaysia seeks investments in the high-technology sector in line with the country’s goals of providing high income for its people.

=== July ===
- 1 July – The police will conduct investigations into two dubious transactions found in the FELDA White Paper, with follow-up actions planned for the other six transactions.
- 25 July – Prime Minister Mahathir Mohamad has been conferred an honorary doctorate by the Ankara Yildirim Beyazit University (AYBU) at the Council of Higher Education.
- 29 July – A lawyer told the High Court that former prime minister Mohammad Najib Abdul Razak, in a defamation suit against former MCA president Ling Liong Sik admitted that RM42mil from SRC International Sdn Bhd went into his personal bank accounts.
- 30 July – The installation of 16th Yang di-Pertuan Agong Al-Sultan Abdullah Ri'ayatuddin Al-Mustafa Billah Shah, Sultan of Pahang at Istana Negara, Jalan Tuanku Abdul Halim, Kuala Lumpur, Malaysia.

=== August ===
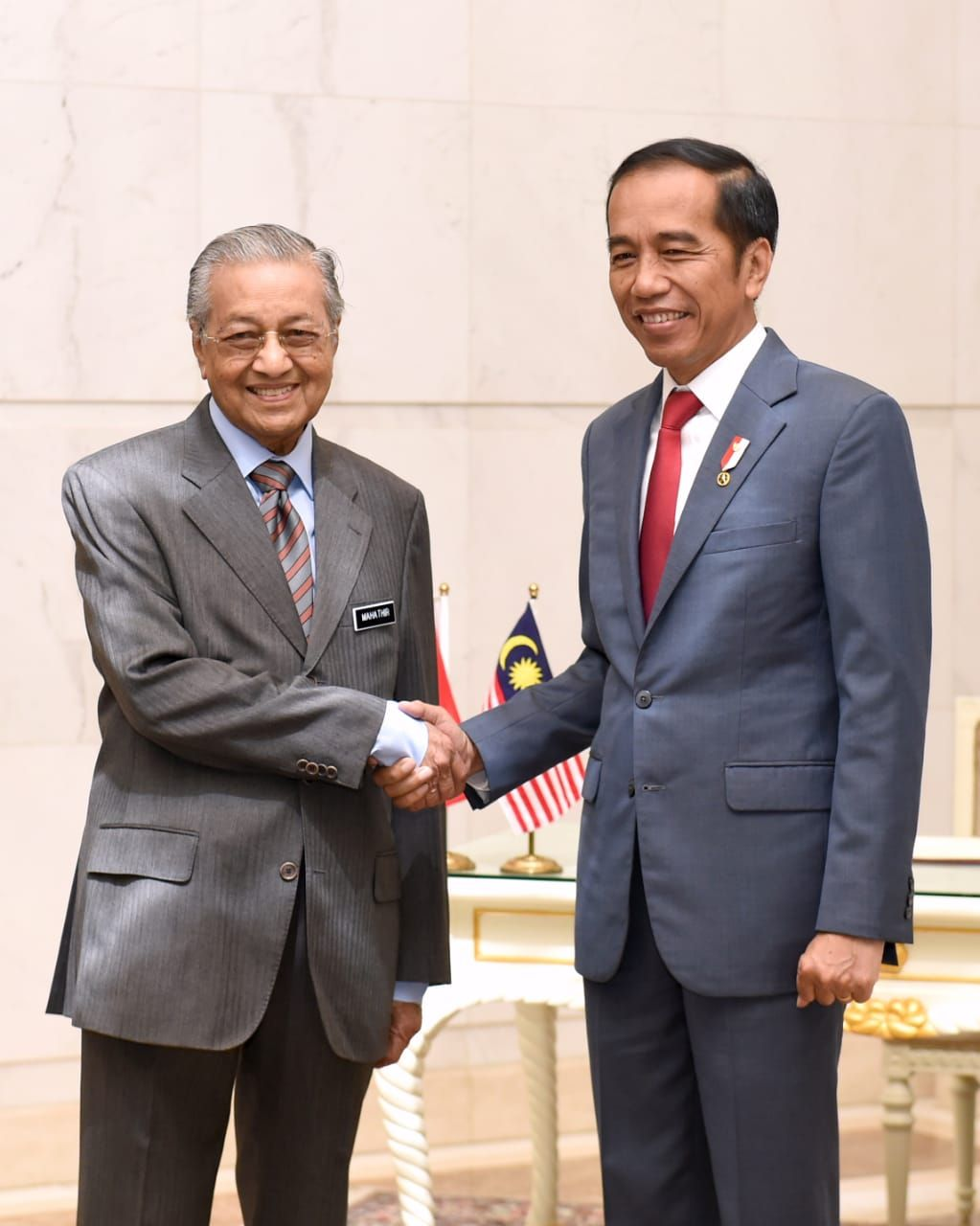
9 August – Mahathir Mohamad and Indonesian President Joko Widodo in Putrajaya, Malaysia.

- 1 August – Kuala Terengganu Drawbridge is open to traffic
- 7 August – Prime Minister Mahathir Mohamad was conferred an honorary doctorate by the International University of Japan (IUJ) in recognition of his outstanding contributions to Malaysia and Japan relationships.
- 9 August – Visiting Indonesian President Joko Widodo arrived at the Perdana Putra building in Putrajaya for a four-eyed meeting with Prime Minister Mahathir Mohamad.
- 13 August – British-Irish Nora Anne Quoirin was missing 9 days ago and found dead later at a resort in Negeri Sembilan.
- 14 August – 2019 Southeast Asian haze:
  - In early August, Klang was shrouded in dense haze caused by fires in Riau, which was exacerbated by a fire at a nearby forest reserve. Major cities and towns in the state of Sarawak, such as Kuching, were also affected by haze from hot spots in Kalimantan.
  - Malaysia also activated its National Action Plan for Open Burning and its existing National Haze Action Plan on 14 August, as air quality in Kuala Baram and Miri reached hazardous levels.
- 16 August – 2019 Southeast Asian haze:
  - Malaysian Maritime Enforcement Agency (MMEA) has dispatched two flights using the Bombardier CL415 aircraft carrying 198,000 litres of water to fight forest fire in Miri.
- 18 August – 2019 Southeast Asian haze:
  - In Rompin, Pahang, the Air Pollution Index (API) recorded on the 18th of August was 223, which is categorized as being "very unhealthy".
- 18 August – Yang di-Pertuan Agong, Al-Sultan Abdullah Ri'ayatuddin Al-Mustafa Billah Shah of Pahang made its 3-day official state visit to Brunei and meets the Sultan Hassanal Bolkiah.
- 19 August – 2019 Southeast Asian haze:
  - Datuk Amar Douglas Uggah Embas, the Deputy Chief Minister of Sarawak, announced that principals would be given discretion on closing their schools if API reading became 'unhealthy'.
- 23 August – 2019 Southeast Asian haze:
  - Several other Malaysian states and federal territories such as Kuala Lumpur, Negeri Sembilan, Penang, Putrajaya and Selangor were also affected by haze from Sumatra in Indonesia while the state of Sarawak had been affected by fires in the state since July and from neighbouring Kalimantan, Indonesia since August. 2.4 hectares of forest also burned in Johor in August.
- 26 August – Yang di-Pertuan Agong, Al-Sultan Abdullah Ri'ayatuddin Al-Mustafa Billah Shah made its 4-day official state visit to Indonesia and meets the Indonesian President, Joko Widodo.
- 31 August – 62nd Independence and National Day of Malaysia (Merdeka Day), marking the 62nd anniversary of Malaysia's independence from the British at the Merdeka Square in the country's capital city, Kuala Lumpur, Malaysia on 31 August 1957, Saturday and the very great independence was declared by the country's very 1st Prime Minister, Tunku Abdul Rahman and the then Deputy Prime Minister Abdul Razak Hussein and then-Yang di-Pertuan Agong (King) Tuanku Abdul Rahman.

=== September ===
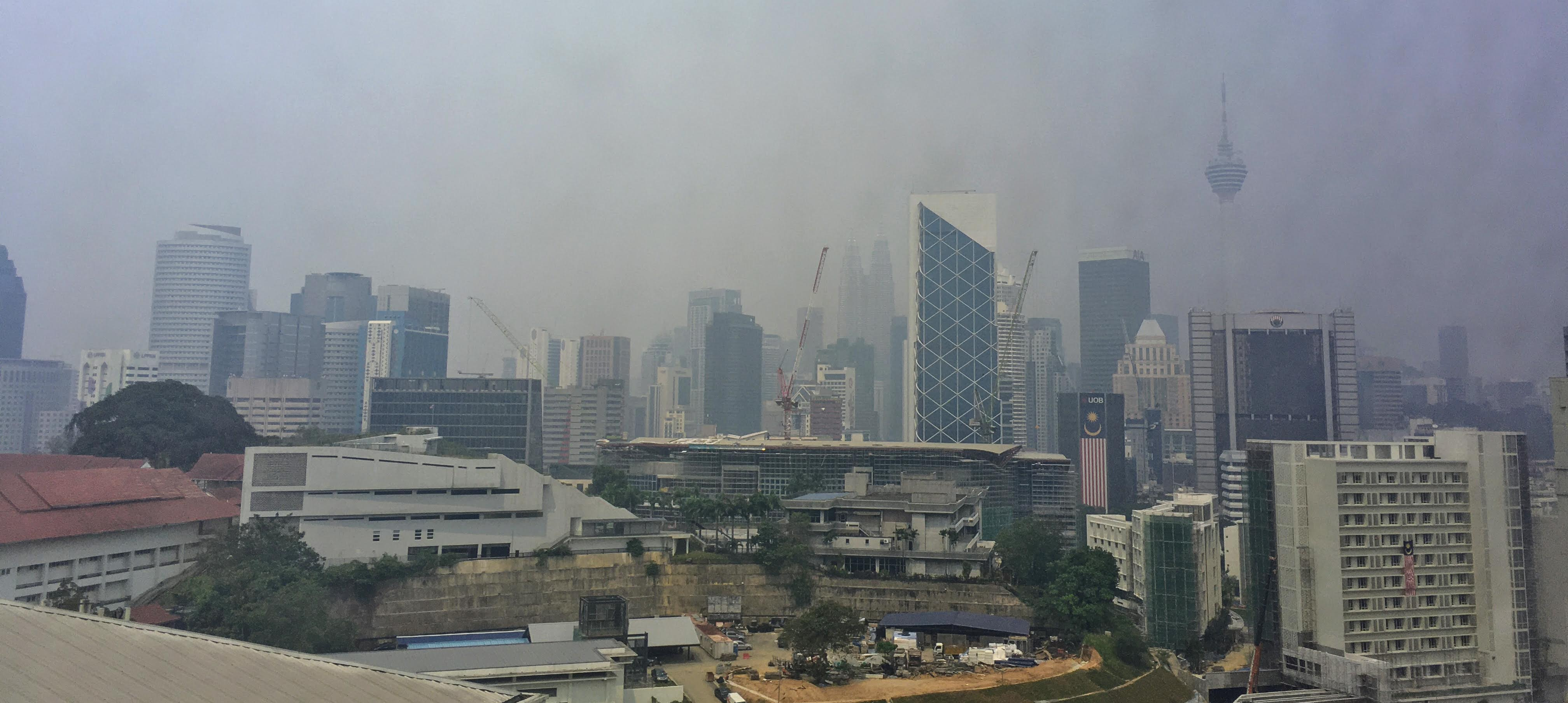
11 September – Smoke engulfing Kuala Lumpur, the capital of Malaysia, The Petronas Twin Towers are barely visible in the photo.

- 6 September – Prime Minister Mahathir Mohamad was conferred an honorary degree by Japan’s Doshisha University. He was conferred the Honorary Doctorate of Humane Letters for his devotion to education and the rule of law.
- 10 September – 2019 Southeast Asian haze:
  - The National Disaster Management Agency (Nadma) sent 500,000 face masks to Sarawak amid worsening trans-boundary haze in the state.
  - The state of Johor's Education Department closed down all schools and kindergartens in Pontian, Muar and Tangkak on September 15 because of the haze, affecting over 64,000 students.
- 16 September – 2019 Southeast Asian haze:
  - Putrajaya and Selangor also announce the closure of 25 and 138 schools respectively for the 17th of September as the haze situation worsened in those areas.
  - In addition, school in Sarawak and Negeri Sembilan were asked to close too, bringing the total of schools shut to 636.
- 18 September – 2019 Southeast Asian haze:
  - During 19–21 September, all schools in Kuala Lumpur, Putrajaya, Selangor, and Penang, totaling at 1,658 schools, were closed. Alongside that, 119 schools in Kedah, 147 in Perak, and 59 in Negeri Sembilan followed the closing on 19 September.
  - The number of schools closed kept increasing steadily, with the total number of schools closed peaking at 2,459, affecting about 1,732,842 students as of 11pm on 18 September 2019.
  - The Ministry of Education announced new standard operating procedures (SOPs) for school closures. The new guidelines state that school closures must be announced by 6pm daily should the API rises above 200. In addition, all outdoor activities must be stopped if the API exceeds 100.
- 19 September – 2019 Southeast Asian haze:
  - Spotify Malaysia created a playlist called Hazed and Confused that included songs about fire and burning.
- 20 September – Luqman Hakim Shamsudin became the first and youngest Malaysian football player to formally sign for Belgian club K.V. Kortrijk with a 5-year contract.
- 28 September – Death of Sultan Ismail Petra:
  - Sultan Ismail Petra died of heart failure at 8:11 am at the Royal Ward of Raja Perempuan Zainab II Hospital, Kota Bharu, aged 69. On that day, the Menteri Besar of Kelantan Ahmad Yakob officially announced his death.

=== October ===
- 5 October – Shared Prosperity Vision 2030 which aimed at increase the incomes of all ethnic groups, particularly the Bumiputera comprising the B40 (lower income group), the hardcore poor, the economically poor, those in economic transition, Orang Asli, Sabah and Sarawak bumiputeras, the disabled, youths, women, children and senior citizens was launched by Prime Minister Mahathir Mohamad.
- 6 October – Mugen Rao wins the Bigg Boss Tamil 3 reality TV show.
- 27 October – Diwali/Deepavali
- 31 October – Malaysia completely switched its television broadcast format from analogue to digital with the last of the analogue switch over (ASO) took place in East Malaysia after 3 phases on 21 July in Langkawi, 19 August in Central and South Peninsular and 14 October in North and East Peninsular.

=== November ===
- 11 November – Former prime minister Mohammad Najib Abdul Razak was ordered by the High Court to enter his defence on all seven charges of abusing his position for gratification, criminal breach of trust and money laundering involving RM42 million of SRC International Sdn Bhd’s funds. Judge Mohd Nazlan Mohd Ghazali said the prosecution had successfully adduced credible evidence proving each and every essential ingredient of the offences.
- 16 November – 2019 Tanjung Piai by-election:
  - It was won by Wee Jeck Seng, candidate of Barisan Nasional from the coalition's component party Malaysian Chinese Association (MCA) who originally held the parliament seat since 2008. But his rule of the constituency was temporarily stopped when he lost to Mohamed Farid Md Rafik, a Malaysian United Indigenous Party (BERSATU) candidate representing Pakatan Harapan during the 2018 Malaysian general election, whose death during his time as member of parliament due to heart attack triggered the by-election. Wee's win meant that he got his seat back from the Pakatan Harapan coalition.
- 30 November – 11 December – Malaysia participated at the 2019 SEA Games in the Philippines, with 773 athletes in 52 sports. It ranked 5th among the participating nations with 55 gold, 58 silver and 71 bronze medals. Its achievement was 15 golds short of its intended 70-gold target. The contingent was affected by the Rhythmic Gymnastics gold-medal issue during the event.

=== December ===
- 3 December – Former prime minister Mohammad Najib Abdul Razak takes the witness stand at the High Court as the first defence witness to answer charges against him.
- 16 December – Convicted killer Azilah Hadri has made an explosive allegation from death row in Kajang Prison - the order to kill Altantuya Shaariibuu came from former Prime Minister Mohammad Najib Abdul Razak and the latter's close associate, Abdul Razak Baginda.
- 18–21 December – Kuala Lumpur Summit was held at the Kuala Lumpur Convention Centre. It was attended mainly by the world's Muslim countries leaders and delegates.
- 20 December – Former prime minister Mohammad Najib Abdul Razak uttered the sumpah laknat (swearing in the face of divine retribution) to deny former police commando Azilah Hadri's statutory declaration (SD) that he gave him the order to kill Altantuya Shaariibuu.

== National Day and Malaysia Day ==
=== National Day theme ===
Sayangi Malaysiaku: Malaysia Bersih (Love My Malaysia: A Clean Malaysia)

=== National Day parade ===
Putrajaya Square, Persiaran Perdana, Putrajaya

=== Malaysia Day celebration ===
Unity Stadium, Kuching, Sarawak

== Sports ==
- 15–20 January – 2019 Malaysian Badminton Masters.
- 23–30 March – 2019 Sultan Azlan Shah Cup.
- 2–7 April – 2019 Malaysian Badminton Open.
- 6–13 April – 2019 Tour de Langkawi.
- 12–19 October – 2019 Sultan of Johor Cup.
- 24 November – 2019 Penang Bridge International Marathon.

== Deaths ==
- 11 January – Bakhtiar Mohd Nor – Malaysian politician.
- 17 March – Sultanah Zanariah – 8th Raja Permaisuri Agong.
- 28 March – Stephen Wong Tien Fatt – Malaysian politician.
- 22 May – Sultan Haji Ahmad Shah Al-Musta'in Billah – 5th Sultan of Pahang and 7th Yang di-Pertuan Agong (1979–1984).
- 28 May – Khoo Kay Kim – Professor Emeritus and renowned historian.
- 17 August – Suffian Rahman – Terengganu FC's goalkeeper.
- 11 September – Shafie Salleh – Chief Scout of Malaysia.
- 21 September – Mohamed Farid Md Rafik – Malaysian politician.
- 28 September – Sultan Ismail Petra – 28th Sultan of Kelantan.

== See also ==
- 2019
- 2018 in Malaysia | 2020 in Malaysia
- History of Malaysia
- List of Malaysian films of 2019
