= 2018 in Malaysia =

- Decades: 1990s; 2000s; 2010s; 2020s
- See also: Other events of 2018; History of Malaysia • Timeline • Years

2018 in Malaysia is 61st anniversary of Malaysia's Independence and 55th anniversary of its formation of Malaysia.

== Incumbents ==
=== Federal level ===
- Yang di-Pertuan Agong: Sultan Muhammad V of Kelantan
- Raja Permaisuri Agong: Vacant
- Deputy Yang di-Pertuan Agong: Sultan Nazrin Muizzuddin Shah of Perak
- Prime Minister:
  - Mohammad Najib Abdul Razak (until 9 May)
  - Mahathir Mohamad (from 10 May)
- Deputy Prime Minister:
  - Ahmad Zahid Hamidi (until 9 May)
  - Wan Azizah Wan Ismail (from 21 May)
- President of the Dewan Negara: Vigneswaran Sanasee
- Speaker of the Dewan Rakyat:
  - Pandikar Amin Mulia (until 15 July)
  - Mohamad Ariff Md Yusof (from 16 July)
- Chief Justice:
  - Md Raus Sharif (until 10 July)
  - Richard Malanjum (from 11 July)

=== State level ===
- Johor:
  - Sultan of Johor: Sultan Ibrahim
  - Menteri Besar of Johor:
    - Mohamed Khaled Nordin (until 12 May)
    - Osman Sapian (from 12 May)
- Kedah:
  - Sultan of Kedah: Sultan Sallehuddin
  - Menteri Besar of Kedah:
    - Ahmad Bashah Md Hanipah (until 10 May)
    - Mukhriz Mahathir (from 11 May)
- Kelantan:
  - Sultan of Kelantan: Tengku Muhammad Faiz Petra (Regent)
  - Menteri Besar of Kelantan: Ahmad Yakob
- Perlis:
  - Raja of Perlis: Tuanku Syed Sirajuddin
  - Menteri Besar of Perlis: Azlan Man
- Perak:
  - Sultan of Perak: Sultan Nazrin Muizzuddin Shah
  - Menteri Besar of Perak:
    - Zambry Abdul Kadir (until 12 May)
    - Ahmad Faizal Azumu (from 12 May)
- Pahang:
  - Sultan of Pahang: Sultan Haji Ahmad Shah Al-Musta'in Billah
  - Menteri Besar of Pahang:
    - Adnan Yaakob (until 15 May)
    - Wan Rosdy Wan Ismail (from 15 May)
- Selangor:
  - Sultan of Selangor: Sultan Sharafuddin Idris Shah
  - Menteri Besar of Selangor:
    - Mohamed Azmin Ali (until 18 June)
    - Amirudin Shari (from 19 June)
- Terengganu:
  - Sultan of Terengganu: Sultan Mizan Zainal Abidin
  - Menteri Besar of Terengganu:
    - Ahmad Razif Abdul Rahman (until 10 May)
    - Ahmad Samsuri Mokhtar (from 10 May)
- Negeri Sembilan:
  - Yang di-Pertuan Besar of Negeri Sembilan: Tuanku Muhriz
  - Menteri Besar of Negeri Sembilan:
    - Mohamad Hasan (until 11 May)
    - Aminuddin Harun (from 12 May)
- Penang:
  - Governor of Penang: Tun Abdul Rahman Abbas
  - Chief Minister of Penang:
    - Lim Guan Eng (until 14 May)
    - Chow Kon Yeow (from 14 May)
- Malacca:
  - Governor of Malacca: Tun Mohd Khalil Yaakob
  - Chief Minister of Malacca:
    - Idris Haron (until 11 May)
    - Adly Zahari (from 11 May)
- Sarawak:
  - Governor of Sarawak: Tun Abdul Taib Mahmud
  - Chief Minister of Sarawak: Amar Abang Johari Abang Openg
- Sabah:
  - Governor of Sabah: Tun Juhar Mahiruddin
  - Chief Minister of Sabah:
    - Musa Aman (until 12 May)
    - Mohd Shafie Apdal (from 12 May)

== Events ==
=== January ===
- 1 January
  - The nation's oldest shopping center, Ampang Park is officially closed.
  - Astro Audio drops the "FM" suffix for all 11 radio stations as part of its re-branding.
- 3 January – Four Singaporeans including a child were an Indonesian rebels killed, while five others were injured in the accident involving five vehicles at the junction of Jalan Lukut-Sepang Port Dickson, Negeri Sembilan.
- 6 January – Mah Siew Keong who is also Plantation Industries and Commodities Minister had reportedly made several mistakes in a few lines leaving the audience amused during a joint rally with MCA. His speech has been edited into a viral video.
- 7 January – 2018 Malaysian general election (GE14):
  - Pakatan Harapan has chosen former prime minister and coalition chairman, Mahathir Mohamad, and coalition president, Wan Azizah Wan Ismail, as their candidate for the prime minister and deputy prime minister post respectively for the upcoming general election.
- 8 January – The High Court in Kuala Lumpur has postponed the hearing of the defamation suit brought by Prime Minister Mohammad Najib Abdul Razak against former MCA president Ling Liong Sik.
- 10 January – Former prime minister, Mahathir Mohamad not allowed by prison authorities to visit People's Justice Party (PKR) chief Anwar Ibrahim in Cheras Rehabilitation Hospital.
- 11 January – An actor and film director, Farid Kamil was arrested for allegedly assaulting a traffic policeman and a civilian at the Kota Damansara police station. He also tested positive for marijuana.
- 27 January – 50,000 Muslims gathered to pray for the Palestine's well-being and liberation of Palestine from Zionist tyranny near Palace of Justice, Putrajaya, Malaysia.
- 29 January
  - Malaysian netizen criticize and make jokes over the new logo of the Visit Malaysia Year 2020 campaign after it was presented at the launch of a promotion in Chiang Mai, Thailand. Minister of Tourism and Culture, Mohamed Nazri Abdul Aziz defend the logo and says criticism is normal, cannot get the consensus of the whole of Malaysia.
  - Film Censorship Board of Malaysia banned Hindi film, Padmaavat because of elements sensitivity to the Muslim.

=== February ===
- 1 February – Five individuals including two Nepali nationals, aged between 19 and 62 were rushed to Penang General Hospital after experiencing weakness, fatigue and unconsciousness as a result of consuming a kind of durian-flavoured premix coffee believed to have mixed with drug.
- 2–10 February – 2018 Sukipt Games in the National University of Malaysia.
- 9–25 February – Malaysia at the 2018 Winter Olympics in Pyeongchang, South Korea.
- 13 February – An Employees Provident Fund (EPF) building in Jalan Gasing, Petaling Jaya, Selangor was nearly destroyed by a fire at 12 noon.
- 22 February – Prime Minister Mohammad Najib Abdul Razak mentioned that he had switched from rice to quinoa because it was better for his health. This had attracted torrents of criticisms and a flurry of Google searches on what exactly was quinoa.
- 23 February – The Prime Minister's Office has clarified that Prime Minister Mohammad Najib Abdul Razak does not rely exclusively on quinoa for his daily nutrition. It said that quinoa was part of Najib's dietary regime because it was recommended by doctors.

=== March ===
- 6 March – Dewan Rakyat Speaker Pandikar Amin Mulia has rejected an emergency motion which was filed to urge Prime Minister Mohammad Najib Abdul Razak to explain attorney-general Mohamed Apandi Ali's statement that the government will not claim businessperson Jho Low's luxury yacht Equanimity.
- 8 March – The weekly magazine Economist featured an article titled "Stop, thief! Malaysia's PM is about to steal an election".
- 11 March – The 1MDB scandal has made to the front page of leading Indonesian current affairs magazine Tempo.
- 16 March – Former MCA president Ling Liong Sik has failed to strike out the suit filed by Prime Minister Mohammad Najib Abdul Razak.
- 21 March – Sand dredging vessel JBB Rong Chang 8 is reported to have capsized off Malaysia's southern state of Johor in the waters of Parit Jawa, Muar in which 14 crewmen were missing. Two crewmen were rescued barely alive from the engine room of the vessel by the Civil Defence personnel 50 hours after being trapped in the vessel.

=== April ===
- 7 April – 2018 Malaysian general election (GE14):
  - The 13th session of the Parliament of Malaysia was dissolved to make way for the 14th general election.
- 10 April – The Jakarta Post said caretaker Prime Minister Mohammad Najib Abdul Razak is reminiscent of former Indonesian president Suharto with his similar “manipulative” tactics. An editorial, the Indonesian daily said: "For Indonesians, the manipulative tactics being used by Malaysian leader Najib Razak to win the upcoming general election is a strong reminder of former president Suharto’s tricks during his 32-year rule."
- 28 April – 2018 Malaysian general election (GE14):
  - Candidate nominations for Parliament seats and state assembly seats were held on this day.

=== May ===
The 2018 Malaysian general election results.

- 9 May – 2018 Malaysian general election (GE14):
  - The 14th general election was held on this day. For the first time in the country's history, the Barisan Nasional coalition was defeated by the opposition coalition Pakatan Harapan, only winning 79 seats against Pakatan Harapan's 121. The Pan-Malaysian Islamic Party won 18 seats while independents won 3 seats. Former prime minister Mahathir Mohamad, who led Pakatan Harapan to victory, manage to defeat his protege Mohammad Najib Abdul Razak.
- 10 May – Mahathir Mohamad is sworn in as the 7th Prime Minister of Malaysia at 9:30 pm (GMT+8), as he becomes the world's oldest elected state leader at the age of 92. This marks his return to the position after holding the post previously for 22 years, from 16 July 1981 until 30 October 2003.
- 12 May
  - A Council of Eminent Persons is formed as government's advisory board, board members are
    1. Tun Daim Zainuddin, former Finance Minister of Malaysia
    2. Tan Sri Zeti Akhtar Aziz, former Governor of Bank Negara Malaysia (BNM)
    3. Tan Sri Hassan Marican, former president and CEO of Petronas
    4. Robert Kuok, Hong-Kong based Malaysian billionaire tycoon
    5. Professor Jomo Kwame Sundaram, prominent economist
  - Lim Guan Eng, Mohamad Sabu and Muhyiddin Yassin are named for three top cabinet posts
  - Former prime minister Mohammad Najib Abdul Razak and wife Rosmah Mansor are barred from leaving the country
  - Mohammad Najib Abdul Razak has resigns as UMNO and Barisan Nasional chief.
- 13 May – Mahathir instructs Inland Revenue Board to return taxes collected 'illegally'.
- 14 May
  - Attorney-general Mohamed Apandi Ali goes on unrecorded leave, duties taken over by solicitor-general.
  - MACC chief Dzulkifli Ahmad has resigns.
  - Treasurer general Mohd Irwan Serigar Abdullah's contract shortened, transferred to Public Service Department.
  - Mahathir says laws on fake news will be clearly defined.
  - Mahathir says political appointments in government-linked companies will be reviewed.
- 15 May
  - Audit Department declassifies its 1MDB report.
  - Council of Eminent Persons sets up a committee on institutional reforms, committee includes:
    1. Retired judge of Court of Appeal Datuk KC Vohrah;
    2. Retired judge of the Court of Appeal and Human Rights Commission of Malaysia (Suhakam) Commissioner Datuk Mah Weng Kwai;
    3. National Patriot Association president Brigadier General (Rtd) Datuk Mohamed Arshad Raji;
    4. University Malaya Tunku Abdul Rahman Professor of Law Emeritus Professor Datuk Dr Shad Saleem Faruqi;
    5. Hakam President and Bar Council former president Datuk Ambiga Sreenevasan.
  - Apandi Ali, Irwan Serigar, Dzulkifli and former IGP Khalid Abu Bakar barred from leaving the country.
- 16 May
  - Pakatan Harapan de facto leader and former Deputy Prime Minister Anwar Ibrahim is released from prison after being pardoned by the Yang di-Pertuan Agong. He had served three years of his prison sentence.
  - 1MDB president Arul Kanda Kandasamy is also barred from leaving the country.
  - Police search Najib's house and seize handbags and clothes.
  - Government announces GST will be zero-rated effective, 1 June 2018.
  - Mahathir to sack 17,000 political appointees from civil service.
  - Registrar of Societies approves Pakatan Harapan's registration.
  - Ministries instructed to cease use of 1Malaysia slogan.
  - Kedai Rakyat 1Malaysia 2.0 (KR1M) programme ceased.
  - Board meetings of the Cooperatives Commission of Malaysia and committees which have political appointees to be postponed.
- 17 May
  - Police search at Najib's house continues.
  - Finance Ministry initiates fiscal reforms.
- 20 May – Former executive of PetroSaudi whistleblower Swiss national Xavier Justo meets Mahathir.
- 21 May
  - Special task force formed to investigate the 1MDB scandal as well as to prosecute wrongdoers and retrieve related assets. Task force would be jointly headed by former attorney-general Abdul Gani Patail, former MACC head Abu Kassim Mohamed, current MACC head Mohd Shukri Abdull and former special branch head Abdul Hamid Bador.
  - Deputy prime minister Wan Azizah Wan Ismail and several federal ministers officially sworn in as members of cabinet.
- 22 May – Former prime minister Mohammad Najib Abdul Razak is brought in for questioning at the Malaysian Anti-Corruption Commission(MACC).

=== June ===
- 1 June – The hugely unpopular Goods and Services Tax (GST) is reduced to 0% by the Malaysian Government.
- 5 June
  - Tommy Thomas is officially appointed as the Attorney General, being the first non-Malay to be appointed to the post.
  - Former prime minister Mohammad Najib Abdul Razak's wife Rosmah Mansor left Malaysia's anti-graft agency headquarters after being quizzed for five hours as part of a probe into the alleged misappropriation of funds at SRC International, a former subsidiary of state investor 1Malaysia Development Berhad (1MDB).
- 20 June – Prime Minister Mahathir Mohamad met the father of murdered Mongolian woman Altantuya Shaariibuu and agreed that the case should be reopened.
- 27 June – Kuala Lumpur International Airport (KLIA) celebrate its 20th anniversary.

=== July ===
- 1 July – Friendster closes down as a company after 16 years.
- 2 July
  - New ministers in Pakatan Harapan's cabinet led by Mahathir were introduced. Remaining members sworn in on that day completes cabinet line-up.
  - UMNO Sungai Besar Branch Chief, Datuk Seri Jamal Yunos was arrested by Indonesian police while having a hair cut at a barbershop in South Jakarta.
- 3 July – Former prime minister Mohammad Najib Abdul Razak is arrested for allegedly stealing US$4.5 billion.
- 4 July – Najib was charged for the first time in the Sessions Court with three counts of CBT and one charge of abusing his post over SRC International Sdn Bhd's funds totalling RM42 million. The case was later transferred to the High Court.
- 16 July – Prime Minister, Mahathir Mohamad lead the 222 Members of Parliament to swear in as members of the Dewan Rakyat for the 14th term of the Malaysian Parliament.
- 17 July – Yang di-Pertuan Agong Sultan Muhammad V of Kelantan opens the first session of 14th Parliament in the Parliament building in Kuala Lumpur.

=== August ===
- 8 August
  - Former prime minister Mohammad Najib Abdul Razak was charged in the Sessions Court with three counts of having received RM42 million in proceeds from unlawful activities into two of his accounts four years ago, with the money belonging to SRC International Sdn Bhd.
  - Touch 'n Go stops selling SmartTAGs, with an RFID pilot to replace these devices starting next month.
- 10 August – High Court Judge Mohd Nazlan Mohd Ghazali dismissed Najib's application for a gag order restraining the media and public from publishing statements on the merits of his criminal charges, which would infer Najib’s guilt pending the disposal of his case.
- 13 August – Najib filed an appeal at the Court of Appeal against the High Court refusal to issue an order restraining the media and public from publishing statements on the merits of his case.
- 19 August – 2 September – 2018 Asian Games in Jakarta and Palembang, Indonesia:
  - Malaysia sending 447 athletes to completed in 38 sports. The national contingent won 7 gold, 13 silver and 16 bronze medals at the continental event.
- 31 August – Malaysia celebrated its 61st Independence Day.

=== September ===
- 1 September – Sales and services tax (SST) replaced Goods and Services Tax (GST).
- 8–15 September – The Inaugural Asia Pacific Masters Games was held in Penang.
- 11–22 September – 2018 Sukma Games in Perak.
- 13 September – Mohamed Shafee Abdullah, the lawyer of former prime minister Mohammad Najib Abdul Razak has been charged with money laundering by anti-corruption agents looking into how billions of dollars went missing from state fund 1Malaysia Development Berhad (1MDB).
- 20 September – Former prime minister Mohammad Najib Abdul Razak has appeared in court facing 25 charges related to the 1MDB scandal, including abuse of power and money laundering.
- 26 September – Local independent publishing house ZI Publications has acquired the rights to publish a Bahasa Malaysia translation of Tom Wright and Bradley Hope's Billion Dollar Whale: The Man Who Fooled Wall Street, Hollywood, and the World.

=== October ===
- 4 October
  - Former prime minister Mohammad Najib Abdul Razak's wife Rosmah Mansor has been arrested at the Malaysian Anti-Corruption Commission (MACC) headquarters, where she was being questioned over her alleged role in the 1MDB scandal.
  - Six firemen drowned while conducting an operation at a mining pool to search and rescue a drowned teenager.
- 6–13 October – 2018 Asian Para Games in Jakarta, Indonesia:
  - Malaysia sending 126 athletes to completed in 15 sports. The national contingent won 17 gold, 26 silver and 25 bronze medals at the continental event.
- 6–18 October – 2018 Summer Youth Olympics in Buenos Aires, Argentina:
  - Malaysia sending 20 athletes to completed in 8 sports. The national contingent won its first two gold medals in the sporting event's history.
- 14 October - Jockey Md Zairi bin Hassim tragically passed away, following an accident at the Perak Turf Club in Ipoh, Perak. Prior to the start of Race 4, while in the saddling area, Zairi's mount—a horse named Hip Hip Hooray—suddenly reared up and flipped backward, crushing him underneath. He received immediate on-site attention from the race day medical team and was rushed via ambulance to the emergency ward of KPJ Ipoh Specialist Hospital, where he succumbed to severe crushing injuries shortly after arrival. Zairi was a respected, hardworking veteran of the Malaysian racing community who accumulated 47 career wins over a riding career spanning 25 years.
- 18 October – UMNO president Ahmad Zahid Hamidi has been arrested the Malaysian Anti-Corruption Commission (MACC).
- 22 October – Sultan Sallehuddin ibni Almarhum Sultan Badlishah is installed as the 29th Sultan of Kedah.
- 25 October – Former prime minister Mohammad Najib Abdul Razak and his former treasury secretary-general jointly are charged with six counts of criminal breach of trust over government payments linked to 1MDB.
- 26 October – The Negeri Sembilan palace has revoked the Datuk Seri titles that were conferred on former prime minister Mohammad Najib Abdul Razak and his wife Rosmah Mansor.

=== November ===
- 6 November – Prime minister Mahathir Mohamad visited Japan, and received a medal of the Emperor of Japan.
- 15 November – Mahathir came back to Kuala Lumpur since end the 33rd ASEAN summit in Singapore.
- 23–28 November – 2018 Para Sukma Games in Perak.

=== December ===
- 4 December – A gas piping explosion in one of the food outlet at Cityone Megamall in Kuching, Sarawak resulted in 3 deaths and 22 injuries.
- 8 December – The Anti-ICERD Rally was organised by opposition right-wing political parties Malaysian Islamic Party (PAS) and United Malays National Organisation (UMNO), with the support of various non-governmental organisations in response to the new Malaysian government's plan to ratify the United Nations convention known as International Convention on the Elimination of All Forms of Racial Discrimination (ICERD).
- 16 December – Mohd Hafiz Nor Azman, a 22-year-old motorcycle racer was killed in an accident when competing at the Petronas AAM Malaysian Cub Prix championships at Dataran Bandar Penawar, Johor.
- 17 December – Malaysia files criminal charges against Goldman Sachs and two former executives over bond sales it organized for 1MDB.
- 18 December – High Court rejected former prime minister Mohammad Najib Abdul Razak’s request to get the letter of authorisation (fiat) on the appointment of lead prosecutor Sulaiman Abdullah, and his application for discovery of documents pertaining to the case.

== National Day and Malaysia Day ==
=== Theme ===
Sayangi Malaysiaku (Love My Malaysia)

=== National Day parade ===
Putrajaya Square, Persiaran Perdana, Putrajaya

=== Malaysia Day celebration ===
Merdeka Square, Kota Kinabalu, Sabah

== Sports ==
- 16–21 January – 2018 Malaysian Badminton Masters.
- 3–10 March – 2018 Sultan Azlan Shah Cup.
- 18–25 March – 2018 Tour de Langkawi.
- 26 June – 1 July – 2018 Malaysian Badminton Open.
- 8–15 September – 2018 Asia Pacific Masters Games.
- 11–22 September – 2018 Sukma Games in Perak.
- 20 September – 7 October – 2018 AFC U-16 Championship.
- 6 –13 October – 2018 Sultan of Johor Cup.
- 15 – 20 October – 2018 Sopma Games.
- 4 November – 2018 Shell Malaysia Motorcycle Grand Prix.
- 23–28 November – 2018 Para Sukma Games in Perak.
- 25 November– 2018 Penang Bridge International Marathon.

== Deaths ==
- 25 January – Rab Khalid – Actor.
- 16 April – Napsiah Omar – Malaysian politician.
- 6 May - Lai Meng – Actress.
- 8 September – Abu Hassan Omar – Malaysian Politician and 12th Menteri Besar of Selangor.
- 14 October – Saleem – Singer.

== See also ==
- 2018
- 2017 in Malaysia | 2019 in Malaysia
- History of Malaysia
- List of Malaysian films of 2018
- 2018 in Malaysian football
- 1Malaysia Development Berhad scandal
