= Farit Ismeth Emir =

Malaysian news anchor (1954–2020)

- فاريت يسمىث ايمير
- Born: 26 October 1954; Teluk Intan, Perak, Federated Malay States (now Malaysia)
- Died: 20 April 2020 (aged 65); Petaling Jaya, Selangor, Malaysia
- Other name: Pak Ngah
- Years active: 1980–2020
- Known for: News anchor for Radio Televisyen Malaysia
- Spouse: Noor Ashikin Othman (until his death)
- Children: 4)

Farit Ismeth Emir (26 October 1954; 71 years ago – 20 April 2020; 6 years ago) was a Malaysian news anchor, best known as a news anchor on Radio Television Malaysia (RTM) in Bes Dunia (now Berita Dunia) (World News) segment involving foreign affairs news. He once contributed his voice in Dunhill's cigarette advertisement where his phrase, "Gaya, mutu, keunggulan" (Style, quality, excellence) became very popular during the time. He was married to Nor Ashikin Othman and had 4 children.

He previously played a doctoral role in RTM's popular radio drama, Nombor 5 Persiaran 1 (Number 5 Tour 1). His best known catchline was "fikir-fikirkan" (think about it). Emir died on 20 April 2020 at Assunta Hospital in Petaling Jaya at the age of 65. His cause of death is said to be cancer. His remains were laid to rest at the Taman Medan (PJS4) Muslim Cemetery, Petaling Jaya after Zuhr prayers.
