= Kuala Lumpur Summit =

- Status: active
- Genre: conference
- Frequency: Annually
- Venue: Kuala Lumpur Convention Centre
- Location: Kuala Lumpur
- Country: Malaysia
- Website: klsummit.my

Kuala Lumpur Summit (KL Summit) also known as Perdana Dialogue is an annual event hosted in Kuala Lumpur, Malaysia.

== KL Summit 2019 ==
The fifth edition of the summit, themed "The Role of Development in Achieving National Sovereignty", was held between 18 - 21 Dec 2019 at the Kuala Lumpur Convention Centre. The goal of this summit was to narrow the gap between Islamic countries and strengthen the power of the Muslim communities in solving various issues. Around 450 delegates comprising leaders, thinkers, intellectuals, politicians and non-governmental organisations from 56 countries including the Emir of Qatar Sheikh Tamim bin Hamad Al Thani, Turkish President Recep Tayyip Erdogan, and Iranian President Hassan Rouhani attended the summit.
