= 2021 Malaysian state of emergency =

Proclamation during the COVID-19 pandemic in Malaysia

- Part of History of Malaysia
- Date: 12 January 2021 – 1 August 2021 (except Sarawak, 12 January 2021 – 3 November 2021)
- Cause: COVID-19 pandemic in Malaysia; Political instability in Malaysia
- Participants: Prime Minister Muhyiddin Yassin; Minister in the Prime Minister's Department (Parliament and Law) Takiyuddin Hassan; Yang di-Pertuan Agong Al-Sultan Abullah of Pahang
- Outcome: Parliament and elections were suspended; The government can introduce laws without approval from parliament

The 2021 Malaysian Proclamation of Emergency (Malay: Proklamasi Darurat Malaysia 2021, Tamil: 2021 மலேசிய அவசரநிலை பிரகடனம்) was a federal proclamation of emergency issued by the Yang di-Pertuan Agong of Malaysia Al-Sultan Abdullah of Pahang to curb the spread of COVID-19 in Malaysia that was in effect from 12 January 2021 to 1 August 2021 nationwide except Sarawak, where the proclamation was not lifted along with other states on 1 August 2021 for the purpose of delaying the Sarawak state election to 2022. However, the proclamation in Sarawak was subsequently lifted on 3 November 2021.

== Chronology ==
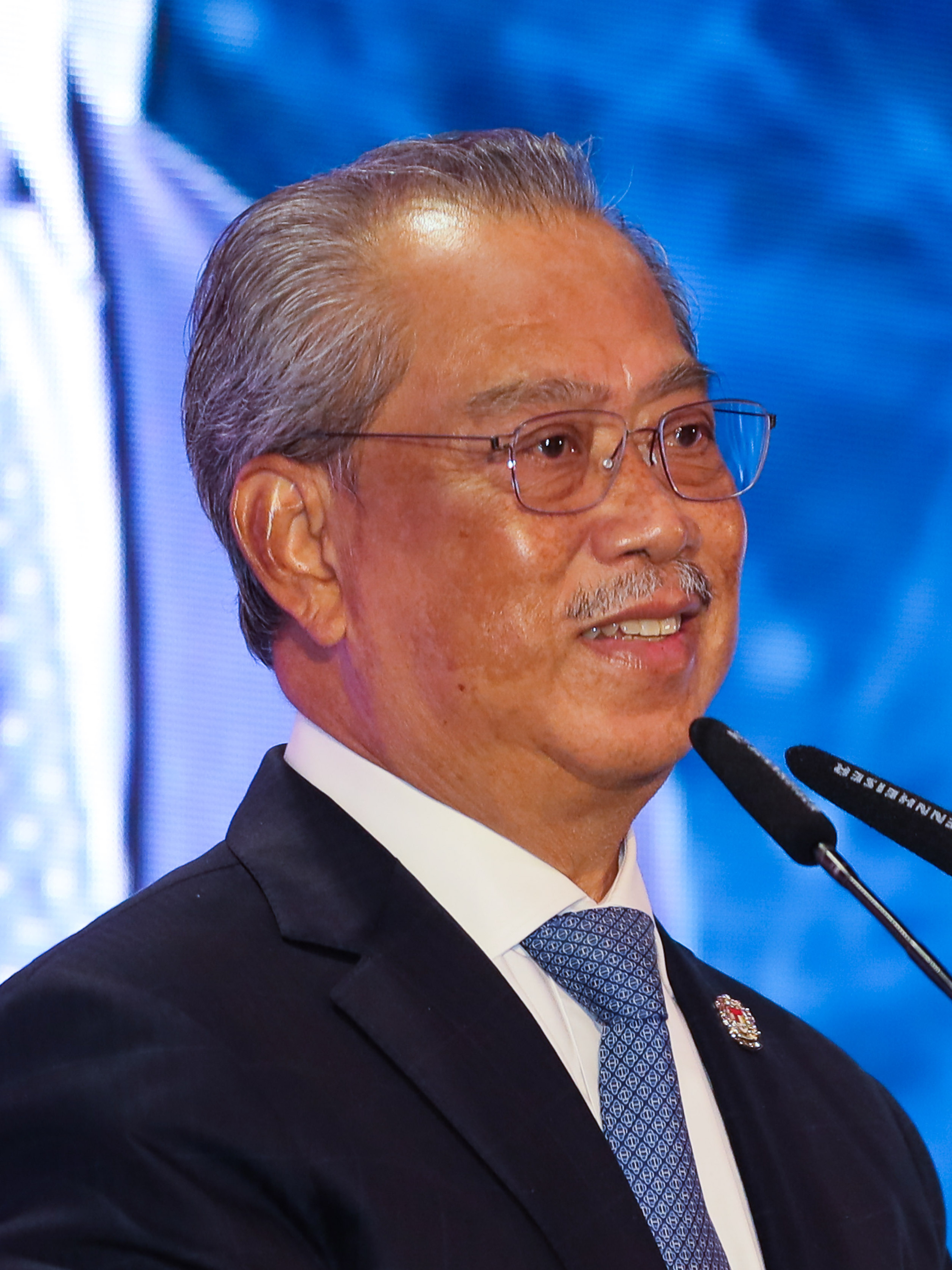
Muhyiddin Yassin, the 8th Prime Minister

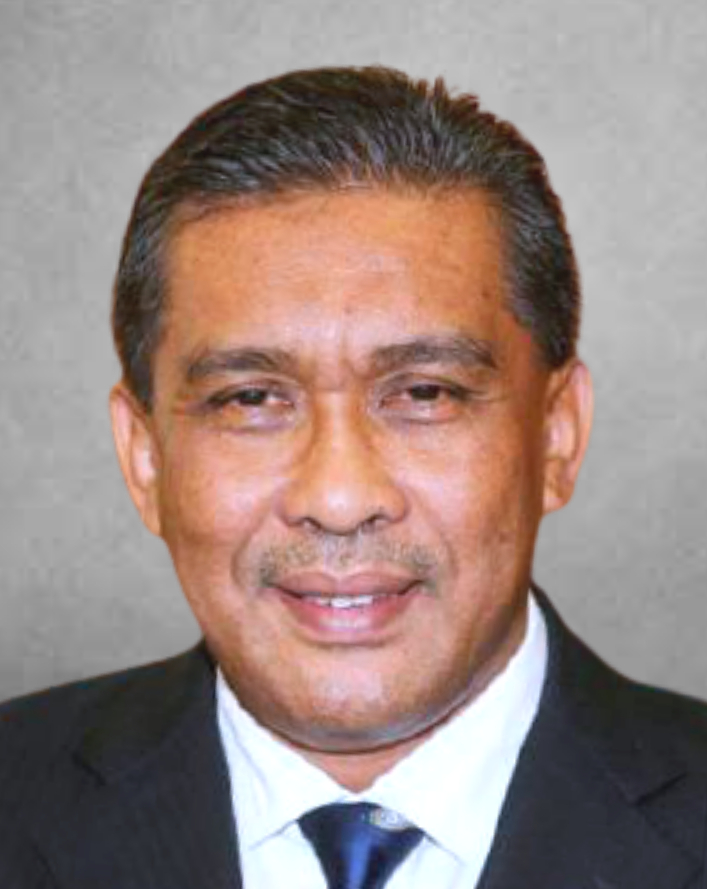
Takiyuddin Hassan,
the Minister in the Prime Minister's Department (Parliament and Law)

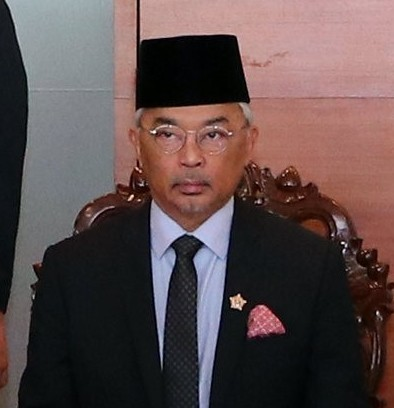
Abdullah of Pahang,
the 16th Yang di-Pertuan Agong

On 25 October 2020, the Yang di-Pertuan Agong Sultan Abdullah of Pahang rejected Prime Minister Muhyiddin's request for him to issue a Proclamation of Emergency pursuant to Article 150(1) of the Federal Constitution of Malaysia in response to a spike in COVID-19 cases throughout Malaysia.

On 16 December 2020, Prime Minister Muhyiddin invoked a state of emergency to stop by-elections scheduled to be held in the Bugaya constituency of Sabah and the Gerik constituency in Perak scheduled for January 2021. The Yang di-Pertuan Agong Abdullah had assented to the request to impose the states of emergency within these two electorates in response to a third wave of infections, which had risen to a total of 86,000 cases and 422 deaths by 16 December.

On 12 January 2021, Sultan Abdullah of Pahang issued a federal proclamation of emergency until at least 1 August 2021 to curb the spread of COVID-19 and in response to a political crisis involving Prime Minister Muhyiddin's Perikatan Nasional government. Under this proclamation of emergency, parliament and elections were suspended while the Malaysian government was empowered to introduce laws without parliamentary debate and voting.

== Controversies and issues ==
Nonetheless, some parties, particularly the opposition disputed the real motive for the proclamation of emergency, namely whether the proclamation was issued to curb the COVID-19 pandemic or was politically motivated; the National Alliance government is currently in a precarious situation with the PN government commanding the confidence of a narrow and hitherto untested majority of MPs in the Dewan Rakyat. Meanwhile, supporters are behind the emergency as it could prevent any election that could further spread the COVID-19 threat, and called for the emergency to be maintained until the COVID-19 pandemic became more under control.

=== Closing of parliamentary session ===
The decision to close the parliamentary session in an emergency situation became a dispute among the country's politicians throughout the proclamation, with the opposition struggling to put pressure on the government to open the parliamentary session for the benefit of the country. Nevertheless, many supported the closure by arguing that the closure of the parliamentary session could have avoided the COVID-19 threat among politicians as well as parliamentary employees.

=== Emergency ordinance and freedom of speech ===
The Emergency (Essential Powers) (No. 2) Ordinance 2021 enacted in March 2021 is an ordinance that emphasizes the issue of untrue news regarding the COVID-19 pandemic. However, the ordinance raises concerns about any abuse of the ordinance that could affect the freedom of speech of Malaysians, especially in the country's ongoing political crisis. These concerns also led to small-scale protest rallies by observers of the right to freedom of expression.

=== Revocation of Emergency Ordinance ===
Sultan Abdullah ordered and gave his consent to the de facto Minister of Law Takiyuddin Hassan on 24 July to present and discuss the proposal to revoke all emergency ordinances in parliament during a virtual meeting with the Attorney General of Malaysia, Idrus Harun.

However, on 26 July 2021, Takiyuddin Hassan announced all the rules of the Emergency Ordinances (EO) had been revoked by the federal government on 21 July. The members of parliament questioned the Yang di-Pertuan Agong's consent to the revocation of the ordinance but was not answered by the government.

Opposition MPs had urged Dewan Rakyat Speaker, Azhar Azizan Harun on 27 July 2021, to compel the government minister to explain to the house its sudden announcement on the revocation of the EO.
