= Abam Bocey =

Malaysian actor and comedian

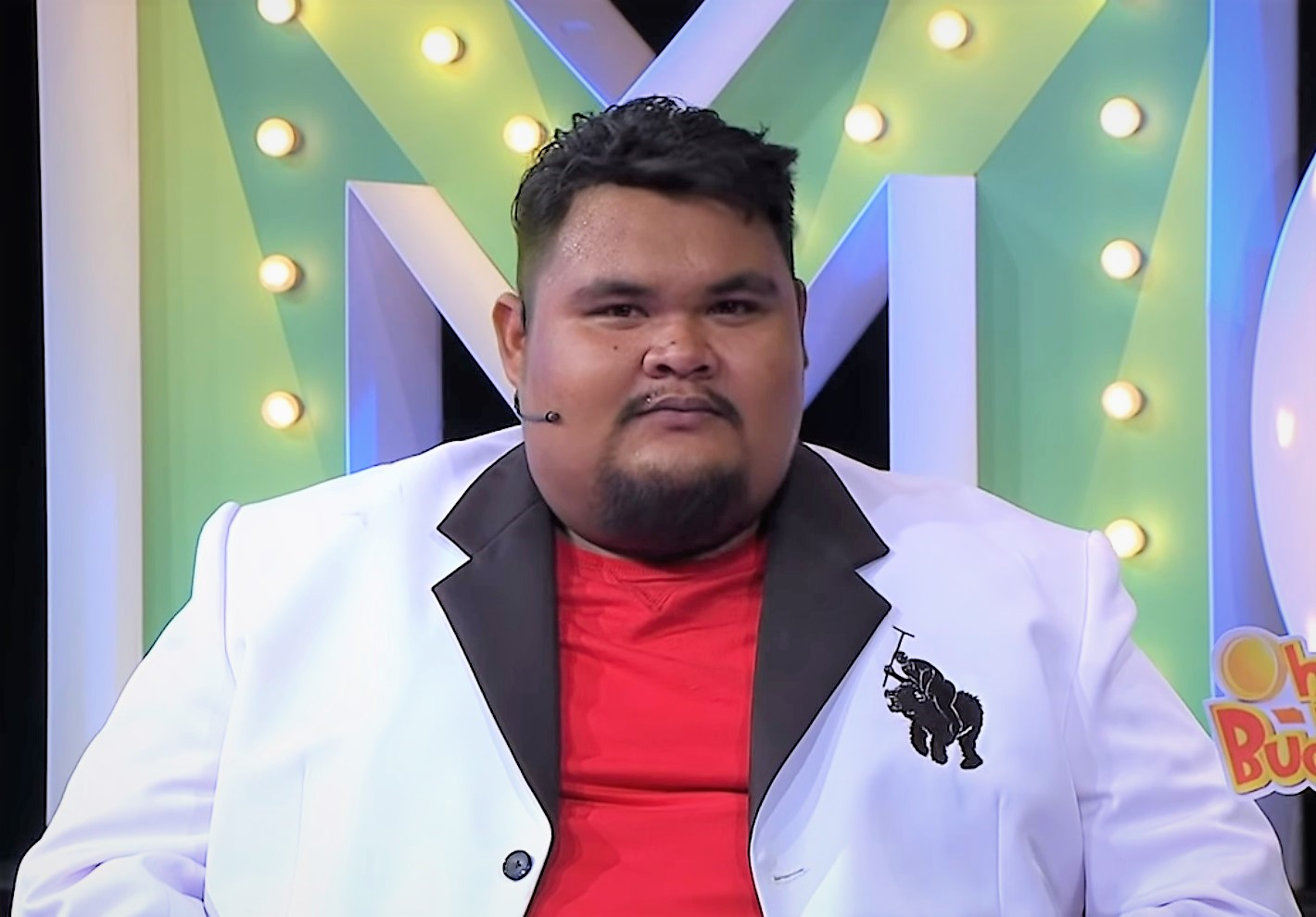
- Born: Syed Umar Mokhtar Al-Juffrey bin Syed Mohd Ridzuan Al-Juffrey; 19 January 1988; Gombak, Selangor, Malaysia
- Died: 10 February 2020 (aged 32); Gombak, Selangor
- Resting place: Sungai Pusu Islamic Cemetery, Gombak
- Occupations: Comedian; Actor; Host Television; Singer
- Years active: 2012–2020
- Spouse: Nor Hidayah Mohd Ali (m. 2017–2020)
- Children: 1
- Family: Ali Puteh (younger)

Comedy career
- Medium: Television, film
- Genres: Comedy, sketch
- Former members: Bocey (2012–2020; his death)

Syed Umar Mokhtar bin Syed Mohd Redzuan or better known as Abam Bocey (19 January 1988 – 10 February 2020) was a Malaysian comedian, actor and member of the group Bocey with Fad and Achey. He was a former participant in the first season of Bintang Mencari Bintang broadcast on TV3. Abam is also famous for the slogan 'Fat is Awesome' because of his large body.

== Personal life ==
Abam married Nor Hidayah Mohd Ali on 8 December 2017 in Taman Air Manis, Sabak Bernam, Selangor. Their wedding ceremony was attended by 5,000 guests including the groom's family members. The couple was blessed with a son, Syed Uthman Hamzah Al-Juffrey.

== Death ==
On 10 February 2020, Abam Bocey died at his residence in Gombak at the age of 32. According to the deceased's wife, Nor Hidayah, Abam had been suffering from high fever and headache since two days before his death. The deceased was buried after Asr prayer on the same day at the Sungai Pusu Islamic Cemetery, Gombak, Selangor.

== Discography ==
=== Album ===
Bocey

- Perjalanan (2015)

=== Single ===
Year	Song title	Composer	Lyricist
2019	Sikasih	Zimi Sofazr	Rongak

== Filmography ==
=== Films ===
Year	Title	Character	Notes
2014	Suatu Malam Kubur Berasap 2	Fat Mechanic	First film
2014	Aku Kawan Mati Dalam Rumah Sewa	Final	
2015	Hantu Bungkus Ikat Tepi	Fendi	
2015	Ada Apa Dekat Bas Stop	Abam	
2015	Isteri Untuk Dijual	Anip	
2016	Kecho! Primadona Kena Hantu	Rahim	
2020	Jodoh Syaitan	Foreskin	Released posthumously
2020	Superbike The Movie	Bread Seller	Released posthumously
2024	Tan-Ti-Ana	Belon	Last film, released posthumously

=== Drama ===
Year	Title	Character	TV Channel	Notes
2016	Geng UPSR (Season 2)	Budi Abang Burger	Astro Tutor TV	First drama
2017	Mak Cun (Season 3)	Daniel	TV3	
2017	Oh My Pondok		Astro Oasis	Sitcom
2017	Saka Sisters	Jamal	Astro Warna	
2017	Tuyul Ke London	Toyol Abam	Astro Warna	
2019	SMK (Season 1)	Coach Faiz	Astro Ceria	
2021	Mamu Mami Gosip		FINAS Malaysia	Sitcom, last drama

=== Participants ===
Year	Title	Group
2012	Raja Lawak Astro (Season 6)	Albob
2013	Bintang Mencari Bintang (Season 1)	Bocik
2013	Maharaja Lawak Mega 2013	Bocey
2014	Super Spontan 2014	Biawak Lazer
2014	Maharaja Lawak Mega 2014	Bocey
2015	Qu Puteh Bintang Bersama Bintang	
2015	Super Spontan All Stars 2015	Kungfu Kipidap
2015	Juara Parodi 2015	Righthanded
2016	Maharaja Lawak Mega 2016	Bocey
2016	Super Spontan Superstar	Harimau Hipster
2017	Maharaja Lawak Mega 2017	Bocey
2018	Bintang Bersama Bintang 2018	
2018	Super Spontan Xtravaganza	Lobster Leler
2018	Maharaja Lawak Mega 2018	Bocey
2019	Muzikal Lawak Superstar (season 1)	Botak
2019	Maharaja Lawak Mega 2019	Bocey

=== Telefilm ===
Year	Title	Character	TV Channel	Notes
2014	Homestay Berhantu	Din	TV9	First telefilm
2014	Bocey Beraya	Abam	Astro Warna	
2014	Samba Bola Kampung	Chopie	Astro Prima	
2014	Terpaku Pontianak	Salman Al-Farisi	TV9	
2015	Aku Mahu Ke New York 1	Abang Mat	Astro Ceria	
2015	Aku Mahu Ke New York 2	Abang Mat	Astro Ceria	
2015	Gebu-gebu Manis	Dollah	Astro Ria	
2015	My Husband Mr. Bear	Mr. Bear	Astro Ria	
2015	Fat Burning Project	Ali	TV1	
2015	Hantu Kubur	Lempang	Astro Prima	
2015	Hantu Botox	Bam	TV3	
2015	Abang Haji	Gufron	TV3	
2015	Salah Susuk Raya	Fendi	Astro Prima	
2016	Bocey Mencecey	Abam	Astro Warna	
2016	Oh My English!: Oh My Goat - Come Baaack!	Mail	Astro TVIQ	
2018	Hantu Rumah Sakit Jiwa	Zed	Astro First Exclusive	
2018	Tiga Bahadol	Maun	Astro Warna	
2019	Terpanah Asmara	Bobby	TV1	Last telefilm

=== Television ===
Year	Title	Role	TV Channel	Notes
2015	Betul Ke Bohong? (Season 7)	Guest Artist	Astro Warna	Episode 6
2016	Gemuk Is Awesome		TV AlHijrah	
2016	Bocey & Friends	Various characters	Astro Warna	
2017	Temasya Sukan ke Laut	Co-host Malek Noor	Astro Warna	
2018	Maharaja Lawak Mega Raya 2018	Participant (Bocey)	Astro Warna	
2018	Bocey & Friends Live	Various characters	Astro Warna	
2020	Maharaja Lawak Mega Raya 2019	Participant (Bocey)	Astro Warna	

== Awards and nominations ==
Year	Award	Category	Nomination	Results
2015	2015 Era MeleTOP Awards	MeleTOP Comedy Artist	Abam Bocey	Nominated
2015	28th Daily News Popular Star Awards	Popular Male Comedy Actor	Abam Bocey	Won
2015	2015 Color Comedy Awards	Most Popular Male Comedy Artist	Abam Bocey	Nominated
2015	2015 Color Comedy Awards	Most Popular Duo or Group Comedy Artist	Bocey Group	Nominated
2016	29th Berita Harian Popular Star Award	Popular Film Artist	Abam Bocey	Nominated
2016	29th Berita Harian Popular Star Award	Popular Comedy Actor	Abam Bocey	Won
2016	29th Berita Harian Popular Star Award	Popular Versatile Artist	Abam Bocey	Nominated
2017	30th Berita Harian Popular Star Award	Popular Versatile Artist	—N/a	Nominated
2017	30th Berita Harian Popular Star Award	Popular Comedy Artist	—N/a	Nominated
