= Kumutha Rahman =

Malaysian politician (1979–2021)

- குமுதா ராமன்

Personal details
- Born: 19 May 1979
- Died: 13 July 2021 (aged 42) Putrajaya, Malaysia
- Party: PAS (Supporters Club)
- Other political affiliations: PKR (2008)
- Occupation: Politician, bank clerk

Kumutha Rahman (19 May 1979 – 13 July 2021) was a Malaysian politician.

== Life and career ==
In March 2008, Kumutha, a former bank clerk, registered herself as a candidate of the Malaysian Islamic Party (PAS), an Islamist political party, for the Tiram consituency in the 2008 Malaysian general election, becoming the first Hindu and non-Muslim person to do so. She eventually lost the election to Barisan Nasional candidate, Maulizan Bujang, and obtained 8,827 votes.

Kumutha later ran as PAS candidate for the second time for a seat in the Tiram constituency in the 2013 Malaysian general election, but she lost again against Bujang and obtained 16,273 votes. After the elections, she later became a Special Officer to Deputy Minister for Women, Family and Community Development, Siti Zailah Mohd Yusoff until her death in 2021.

== Death ==
On 13 July 2021, Kumutha died at Putrajaya Hospital at afternoon due to COVID-19 in Putrajaya during the pandemic in Malaysia. She was 42. Leader of PAS, Abdul Hadi Awang and Deputy Minister Siti Zailah Mohd Yusoff later expressed condolences to her family.

== See also ==
- List of deaths due to the COVID-19 pandemic
