= 2020–2021 Malaysian floods =

Flooding in Malaysia

- Date: November 2020 – January 2021
- Location: Pahang Kuantan, Temerloh, Maran, Rompin, Pekan, Bera, Raub, Jerantut, Lipis Johor Johor Bahru, Batu Pahat, Kluang, Kota Tinggi, Segamat, Mersing Terengganu Kemaman, Dungun, Hulu Terengganu, Besut Kelantan Pasir Mas, Tanah Merah, Kuala Krai, Gua Musang, Jeli Perak Hilir Perak, Hulu Perak, Kampar Selangor Hulu Selangor, Kuala Selangor, Hulu Langat Sabah Beaufort
- Cause: Northeast Monsoon Winds
- Deaths: 9 people (from 9 January 2021)

2020–2021 Malaysian floods was an event when several states in Malaysia were flooded in late 2020 and early 2021. Floods caused about tens of thousands of people to be evacuated to evacuation centers. The floods also claimed several lives, causing almost all types of land transport in the areas affected by the floods to be cut off.

== Affected areas ==
The floods affected part of Peninsular Malaysia. Pahang and Johor are the states most severely affected by the floods this time. Other states involved are Terengganu, Kelantan, Selangor and Perak. Floods also occurred in Beaufort, Sabah.

== Cause of flooding ==
Heavy rains for several days in a row were caused by the Northeast Monsoon Winds that hit the South China Sea, across Peninsular Malaysia. Heavy rains also hit Thailand, and also caused severe flooding there.

== Damage ==
Large floods have affected land transport in the affected states. There was a landslide in Bukit Fraser, Pahang. The East Coast expressways is closed from any vehicle starting from Karak to Lanchang. Federal and state roads were also closed.

== Casualties ==
In Kelantan, a man was killed in this flood in Kampung Tasek Gong Kala, Pasir Puteh. Pahang, on the other hand, recorded two children killed after being swept away by the strong currents of Sungai Puas, Pahang. There were two casualties due to the floods, dan involving a woman and a young man in Johor.

== Responses ==
=== Warning ===
Heavy rain and flood warnings have been issued by the Malaysian Meteorological Department (MetMalaysia) since early November 2020.

=== During flooding ===
The temporary evacuation center (PPS) was opened and operated by the Social Welfare Department (JKM) based on the instructions of the National Security Council. Apart from coordinating the opening of PPS, JKM also acts to provide all the basic needs in each PPS for the welfare of each flood victim. JKM also provides food supply to victims as well as coordinates actions to comply with the new standard operating procedures (SOP) norms with various relevant agencies. JKM also updates disaster information through the InfoBencanaJKM application. The Kelantan State Government also updated the flood information that occurred in the state in a special portal. Facebook also launched a special crisis response portal on the social media site on 1 January 2021.

== See also ==
- Floods in Malaysia
