= 2017 in Malaysia =

- Decades: 1990s; 2000s; 2010s; 2020s
- See also: Other events of 2017; History of Malaysia • Timeline • Years

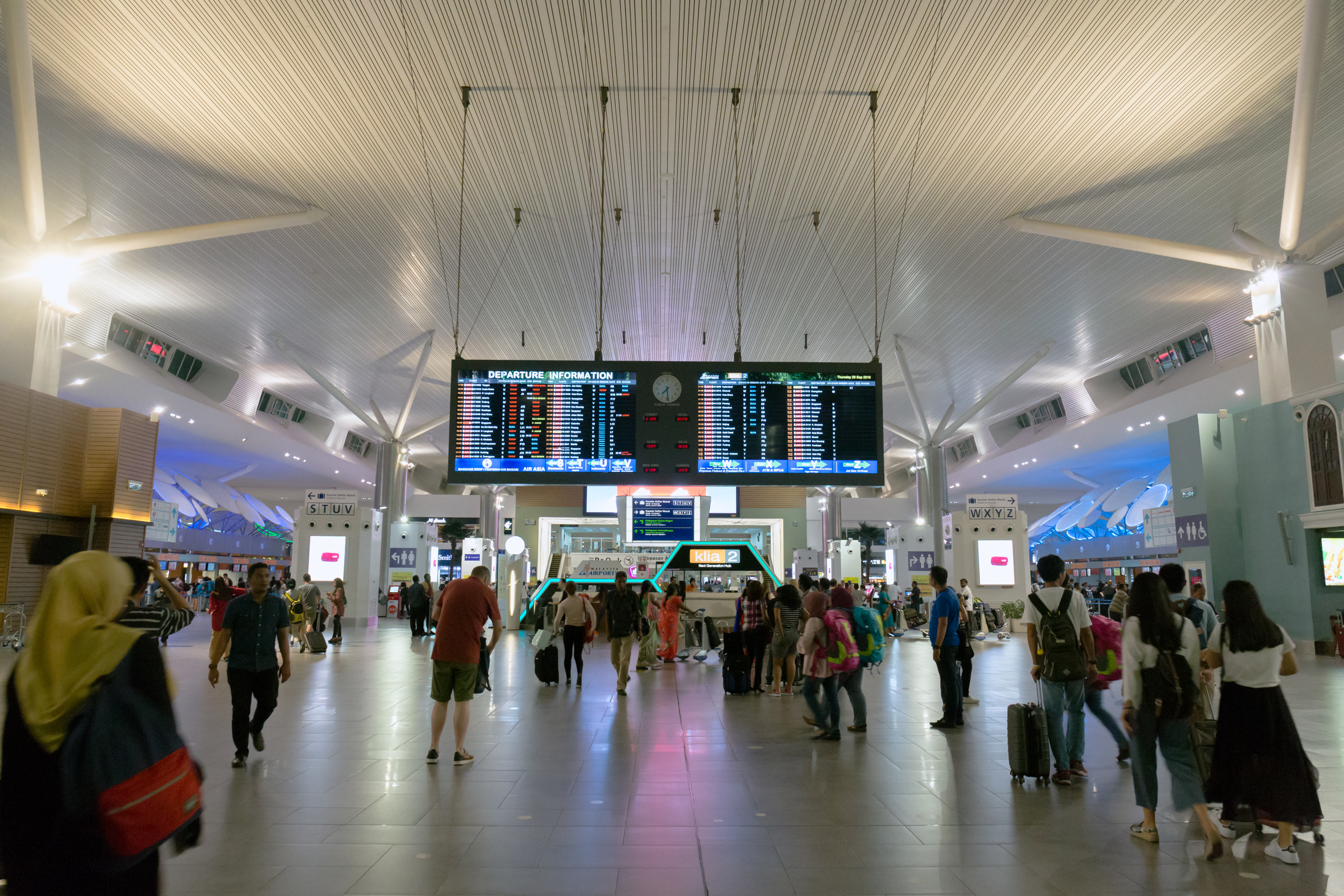
Assassination of Kim Jong-nam the older half-brother of the North Korean leader Kim Jong Un, was assassinated at Kuala Lumpur International Airport in Malaysia on 13 February.

The following lists events from

2017 in Malaysia is the 60th anniversary of Malaysia's independence and the 54th anniversary of the formation of Malaysia.

== Incumbents ==
=== Federal level ===
- Yang di-Pertuan Agong: Sultan Muhammad V of Kelantan
- Raja Permaisuri Agong: Vacant
- Deputy Yang di-Pertuan Agong: Sultan Nazrin Muizzuddin Shah of Perak
- Prime Minister: Mohammad Najib Abdul Razak
- Deputy Prime Minister: Ahmad Zahid Hamidi
- President of the Dewan Negara: Vigneswaran Sanasee
- Speaker of the Dewan Rakyat: Pandikar Amin Mulia
- Chief Justice:
  - Arifin Zakaria (until 31 March)
  - Md Raus Sharif (from 1 April)

=== State level ===
- Johor:
  - Sultan of Johor: Sultan Ibrahim
  - Menteri Besar of Johor: Mohamed Khaled Nordin
- Kedah:
  - Sultan of Kedah:
    - Sultan Abdul Halim Mu'adzam Shah (until 11 September)
    - Sultan Sallehuddin (from 12 September)
  - Menteri Besar of Kedah: Ahmad Bashah Md Hanipah
- Kelantan:
  - Sultan of Kelantan: Tengku Muhammad Faiz Petra (Regent)
  - Menteri Besar of Kelantan: Ahmad Yaakob
- Perlis:
  - Raja of Perlis: Tuanku Syed Sirajuddin
  - Menteri Besar of Perlis: Azlan Man
- Perak:
  - Sultan of Perak: Sultan Nazrin Muizzuddin Shah
  - Menteri Besar of Perak: Zambry Abdul Kadir
- Pahang:
  - Sultan of Pahang: Sultan Haji Ahmad Shah Al-Musta'in Billah
  - Menteri Besar of Pahang: Adnan Yaakob
- Selangor:
  - Sultan of Selangor: Sultan Sharafuddin Idris Shah
  - Menteri Besar of Selangor: Mohamed Azmin Ali
- Terengganu:
  - Sultan of Terengganu: Sultan Mizan Zainal Abidin
  - Menteri Besar of Terengganu: Ahmad Razif Abdul Rahman
- Negeri Sembilan:
  - Yang di-Pertuan Besar of Negeri Sembilan: Tuanku Muhriz
  - Menteri Besar of Negeri Sembilan: Mohamad Hasan
- Penang:
  - Governor of Penang: Tun Abdul Rahman Abbas
  - Chief Minister of Penang: Lim Guan Eng
- Malacca:
  - Governor of Malacca: Tun Mohd Khalil Yaakob
  - Chief Minister of Malacca: Idris Haron
- Sarawak:
  - Governor of Sarawak: Tun Abdul Taib Mahmud
  - Chief Minister of Sarawak:
    - Adenan Satem (until 11 January)
    - Amar Abang Johari Abang Openg (from 13 January)
- Sabah:
  - Governor of Sabah: Tun Juhar Mahiruddin
  - Chief Minister of Sabah: Musa Aman

== Events ==
=== January ===
- 1 January
  - Visit ASEAN Year 2017 has officially begun.
  - The new speed limiters device for all buses are enforced.
  - The light reflectors became compulsory to all commercial vehicles.
  - At least ten people were injured during a New Year's Day fireworks show at the Pandamaran Sports Complex in Port Klang, Selangor.
- 9 January
  - Anwar Ibrahim arrived in Penang high court for his RM70 million defamation suit against an English daily and three other parties.
  - Suasa Airlines was fined RM380,000 for carrying passengers between Kuala Lumpur and Langkawi without a valid permit in Sepang court, Selangor. Suasa Airlines operated this flight as a "demonstration flight" on 22 July 2016.
  - Mohd Faiz Subri, Malaysian footballer won the Puskás Award for best goal at the Best FIFA Football Awards for 2016 in Zurich, Switzerland.
- 11 January – Death of Adenan Satem:
  - Chief Minister of Sarawak, Adenan Satem died at the age of 72. His body was buried in a Muslim cemetery Semariang, Kuching, Sarawak.
- 12 January – Death of Adenan Satem:
  - Sarawak declared mourning for seven days to commemorate the death of Tan Sri Adenan Satem.
- 13 January – Death of Adenan Satem:
  - Parti Pesaka Bumiputera Bersatu (PBB) deputy president Datuk Amar Abang Johari Abang Openg sworn as the sixth Sarawak chief minister in front of Governor of Sarawak Tun Abdul Taib Mahmud at the Astana Negeri in Petra Jaya at 4:05 pm.
  - He succeeds Tan Sri Adenan Satem who died of heart failure on 11 January.
- 13 January – Three Malaysian militants, including an Islamic State (IS) group leader, were killed following airstrikes in Raqqa, Syria, according to reports by Bukit Aman counter terrorism unit deputy director Ayob Khan Mydin Pitchay.
- 17 January – The second anniversary of the Malaysia Airlines Flight MH370 crash:
  - Australia, China and Malaysia announced the suspension the underwater search because unable to locate aircraft.
- 18 January – Former MCA President Ling Liong Sik was installed as University Tunku Abdul Rahman's (UTAR) first chancellor during the university's 24th convocation ceremony.
- 19 January – Because hitting a luxury car believed to belong to a 'Datuk', a truck driver was beaten by a group of men in Ampang, Selangor allegedly unhappy with the incident that could not be avoided. The incident was recorded by the camera and viral on social media.
- 25 January – 1,596 people were evacuated from 7 districts in Pahang but no casualties were reported.
- 28 January – 2017 Mengalum Island boat accident:
  - A boat carrying with 31 people including 28 China tourist was reported missing during journey from jetty Tanjung Aru to Mengalum Island, Sabah.
- 29 January – 2017 Mengalum Island boat accident:
  - The boat captain and one crew member were rescued by another tourist boat on in afternoon after they floating in the sea for a day. While a fishermen boat found the 20 Chinese tourists along with the three that are confirmed dead some hours later, comprising two men and a woman but six people still are missing.
- 30 January – 2017 Mengalum Island boat accident:
  - Prime Minister Mohammad Najib Abdul Razak called for a thorough investigation over the incident and called all parties to abide by rules and guidelines set by the Government to ensure their safety. He wrote on Facebook that "I take the Sabah boat capsize tragedy very seriously, and I want a thorough investigation to identify the cause of the incident. However, for now, complete focus must be given to the search and rescue of six other victims who are still missing".
  - Chief Minister of Sabah Musa Aman offered his deepest condolences to the families of the victims who perished in the incident and called for relevant authorities to enforce strict regulation. The Chief Minister added "My thoughts and prayers also go to those who are still missing".

=== February ===
- 1 February – 2017 Mengalum Island boat accident:
  - A body of man was found by local authorities 500 metres in the waters south of Mamutik Island, Sabah but it was confirmed later that the body are not part of the boat mishap missing victims but a men who went missing while fishing with his friends off Dinawan Island, Sabah.
- 2 February – Malaysia filed the application for revision of the International Court of Justice judgement following its discovery of three documents at the National Archives of the United Kingdom to support its claim on sovereignty Pedra Branca and South Ledge.
- 4 February – 2017 Mengalum Island boat accident:
  - One missing victim is found and confirmed as one of the unidentified woman passengers (later identified as Yang Jia Yi).
  - One of the boat skippers was sentenced to six months in prison, an accusation which the boat operator acknowledge and pleaded guilty while the boat owner was released on bail and will be on trial again in the next week since the owner does not know Malay language.
- 4 February – Nautical Aliya ship, mission of humanitarian flotilla to help ethnic Rohingya has departed from Port Klang accompanied by 195 activist and international volunteers and volunteers organized the 1Malaysia Putera Club (KP1M) and the Malaysian Islamic Organization Consultative Council (MAPIM) with the support of ASEAN and international non-governmental organizations.
- 7 February – Malaysian worst Canada serial rapist, Selva Kumar Subbiah has returned to Kuala Lumpur International Airport, Sepang after being deported by Canada authorities because end of terms 24 years in prison since year 1992. Selva found guilty of 19 counts of sexual assault, 28 counts of administering a drug or noxious substance, 10 counts of various kinds of assault and a dozen other charges, including extortion.
- 8 February – 2017 Mengalum Island boat accident:
  - The investigation papers on the catamaran have been complete and concluded the boat has overloaded beyond specified capacity combined with poor weather conditions.
- 13 February – Assassination of Kim Jong-nam:
  - Kim Jong-nam half brother of North Korea leader Kim Jong-un was assassinated in Malaysia by two unidentified women, speculated to be North Korean agents, during his return trip to Macau at the low-cost carrier terminal of the Kuala Lumpur International Airport.
- 14 February – Assassination of Kim Jong-nam:
  - Following Kim's death, Malaysian police arrested a woman at Kuala Lumpur International Airport in connection to the attack on 13 February 2017. The woman, a 28-year-old named Đoàn Thị Hương, was in possession of Vietnamese travel documentation.
- 15 February – Assassination of Kim Jong-nam:
  - A post-mortem on Kim was conducted at the Kuala Lumpur Hospital mortuary in the presence of several North Korean officials.
- 16 February – Assassination of Kim Jong-nam:
  - A 25-year-old woman named Siti Aishah with Indonesian travel documentation was arrested in connection to the case and identified as the second female suspect. Aishah's boyfriend, a 26-year-old Malaysian named Muhammad Farid Bin Jalaluddin, was also arrested to assist in the investigation.
- 17 February – Assassination of Kim Jong-nam:
  - Malaysian police arrest of a fourth suspect, a North Korean man identified as 46-year-old Ri Jong Chol. He was arrested on the night of 17 February in Selangor.
- 18 February – Eight male teenagers on bicycles were killed after they were mowed down by a car on Jalan Lingkaran Dalam, besides the Mahmoodiah cemetery, near Johor Bahru early morning.
- 18 February – 2017 Tanjong Datu by-election results:
  - Jamilah Anu, Barisan Nasional candidate and the widow of former Chief Minister of Sarawak Adenan Satem, won the election with a 6,443 majority defeated Parti Bansa Dayak Sarawak Baru candidate, Rapelson Richard Hamit and State Reform Party candidate, Johnny Aput.
- 19 February – Assassination of Kim Jong-nam:
  - Malaysian police named four more North Korean suspects. They were identified as Rhi Ji-hyon (aged 33), Hong Song-hac (34), O Jong-gil (55) and Ri Jae-nam (57), all of whom left Malaysia after the attack, and the Malaysian police requested help from Interpol and other relevant authorities in tracking them.
- 19–26 February – Malaysia at the 2017 Asian Winter Games in Sapporo, Hokkaido, Japan.
- 20 February – Assassination of Kim Jong-nam:
  - Japanese television network Fuji TV released surveillance video, which it says it obtained from the Kuala Lumpur International Airport, purporting to show the alleged attack on it appears to show one of two women grabbing a man who appears to be Kim Jong Nam from behind and putting him in what looks like a chokehold.
- 22 February – The Kuala Lumpur High Court has declined to decide on former MCA president Ling Liong Sik's application to strike out Prime Minister Mohammad Najib Abdul Razak's suit on the ground that Najib cannot sue in his capacity as a public official.
- 22 February – Assassination of Kim Jong-nam:
  - Malaysian police inspector-general Khalid Abu Bakar said that the killing was "a planned effort" and that the two women arrested had been trained to carry out the attack and had repeatedly rehearsed it together at Pavilion Kuala Lumpur and Kuala Lumpur City Centre (KLCC). Khalid also said that the women apparently admitted that they knew they were handling poisonous substances.
  - An unnamed Malaysian man believed to be a chemist was picked up by police during a raid on a condominium where he then led police to another condominium where various chemicals were seized.
- 24 February – Assassination of Kim Jong-nam:
  - Malaysian police announced that a preliminary analysis found VX nerve agent, man-made chemical warfare agent that's classified as a nerve agent the most toxic and quick-acting of the known chemical warfare on the eyes and face of the Kim Jong-nam.
- 26 February – Assassination of Kim Jong-nam:
  - After conducting a two-hour sweep to decontamination chemical, police declared the terminal at the Kuala Lumpur International Airport a "safe zone." They said they found no hazardous material nor trace of the nerve agent that was allegedly used in the attack.
- 26 February – King of Saudi Arabia, King Salman made four-day state visit to Malaysia. This is a first state visit to Malaysia since ascending the throne on 23 January 2015.
- 28 February – Assassination of Kim Jong-nam:
  - Aisyah and Houng were charged with murder, which carries a mandatory death sentence.
- 28 February – Three people were killed and four others, including an infant, were injured when a train car crashed into a van near Kampung Memanjang in Beaufort district, Sabah.

=== March ===
- 1 March – Assassination of Kim Jong-nam:
  - The suspect, Aisyah and Huong appeared in court and were both formally charged with Kim's murder. They were not required to enter a plea, but both told the court they were not guilty.
- 3 March – Assassination of Kim Jong-nam:
  - The only detained North Korean suspect, Ri Jong-chol, was released and deported due to lack of evidence.
- 4 March – Assassination of Kim Jong-nam:
  - The North Korean ambassador Kang Chol was declared a persona non grata and expelled to which North Korea reacted in kind.
- 6 March – Assassination of Kim Jong-nam:
  - Malaysia ending visa-free travel for North Koreans this week, citing security reasons from Malaysia–North Korea tension.
  - North Korea retaliated and designated the Malaysian ambassador, Mohamad Nizan Mohamad as persona non grata and demanded the envoy leave the country within 48 hours. However, the Malaysian Ambassador had already been recalled to Kuala Lumpur for consultation and arrived on 22 February.
- 6 March – Yang di-Pertuan Agong, Sultan Muhammad V of Kelantan made first meeting of the fifth term of the 13th Parliament in the Parliament building, Kuala Lumpur.
- 7 March – Assassination of Kim Jong-nam:
  - North Korean authorities reacted by forbidding all Malaysians citizens in North Korea to leave the country. Malaysian authorities retaliated by forbidding North Korean citizens to leave Malaysia.
- 7 March – Malaysia police announced they had foiled a plot attack against King of Saudi Arabia, King Salman and Saudi Arabia monarch on a tour of Asia last week and arrested seven men, including four Yemeni nationals.
- 8 March – The third anniversary of the Malaysia Airlines Flight MH370 crash
- 8 March – Assassination of Kim Jong-nam:
  - For the first time, Prime Minister Mohammad Najib Abdul Razak has directly accused North Korea of murdering Kim Jong Nam.
- 10 March – Assassination of Kim Jong-nam:
  - Malaysia police completed the autopsy, confirming that the body belonged to Kim Jong-nam based from DNA provided by his son Kim Han-sol and the body was handed to the Ministry of Health for further action. The Health Ministry said they would then give Kim's family two to three weeks to claim his body, with the body having been embalmed to preserve it during the period. The family however declined to take the body and gave the Malaysian authorities permission to manage the remains.
- 14 March
  - A factory worker was killed when a car driven by a teenage girl reportedly against the current at North-South Expressway near Seberang Perai Tengah, Penang. Police believe the 19-year-old girl who was driving the Proton Gen 2 is driving under the influence. This incident sparks outrage at social media.
  - Ministry of Communications and Multimedia launched SEBENARNYA.MY portal for the public to check on the authenticity of news spread through social websites.
  - Lexis Hibiscus, Port Dickson, Negeri Sembilan accolades from two Guinness World Records for most swimming pools and overwater villas in a resort in the world.
- 16 March – Assassination of Kim Jong-nam:
  - Interpol issued a red notice for the four North Korean suspects who had fled to Pyongyang.
- 19 March – The Kelantan Veterinary Services Department destroyed thousand birds and eggs in a bid to stem the outbreak of avian influenza (H5N1) in the state.
- 21–25 March – The Langkawi International Maritime and Aerospace Exhibition (LIMA) 2017 is held in Langkawi, Kedah.
- 22 March – Google Doodle honours P. Ramlee, Malaysian actor and director at Malaysian homepage engine to celebrate his 88th birthday.
- 23 March – The High Court has deferred its decision on former MCA President Ling Liong Sik's application to strike out a suit by Prime Minister Mohammad Najib Abdul Razak, pending the outcome of two Federal Court matters as to whether a public official has legal standing to sue an individual for defamation.
- 24 March – 2016 Movida Bar grenade attack:
  - Nine people suspected links to Islamic State have been arrested by Malaysian police, including one believed to be involved in a bombing at a nightclub in June last year that injured eight people between 15–21 March.
- 30 March – Assassination of Kim Jong-nam:
  - After negotiations between both sides to end their dispute, all stranded Malaysians in North Korea as well North Koreans in Malaysia were allowed to return to their countries with a recent receipt of a letter from the deceased's family requesting the remains of Kim's be returned to his country following the completion of further autopsy.
  - The three North Korean suspects, Ri Ji-u, Kim Uk-il and Hyon Kwang-song, who were holed up in the North Korean embassy in Malaysia were released and allowed to return home after investigators interviewed them and cleared them of any wrongdoing.

=== April ===
- 1 April – Md Raus Sharif appointed as 14th Chief Justice of Malaysia replacing Arifin Zakaria who retired at age 66 years and six months on 31 March.
- 2 April – Six people were killed when a trailer crashed head-on into the MPV car were travelling in at km403.3 of the North-South Expressway near the Tanjung Malim toll plaza, Perak.
- 6 April – PAS President, Datuk Seri Abdul Hadi Awang, tabled the Hudud bill, which seeks to amend the Shariah Courts (Criminal Jurisdiction) Act 1965 at Parliament, Kuala Lumpur.
- 7 April – Dewan Rakyat sets a records for the longest Parliament session occurred in Malaysia history.
- 7 April – 2017 Mengalum Island boat accident:
  - Families of the tourists victims have engaged their lawyers to file petitions claiming for compensation from involved quarters, including the tour operator.
- 8 April – Malaysia Airlines flight MH2718 carrying 61 passengers and six crew members from Kuala Lumpur skidded upon landing at Sibu Airport in Sibu, Sarawak but no injuries reported.
- 10 April – Prime Minister Datuk Seri Mohammad Najib Abdul Razak condemned the bombings at churches in Tanta and Alexandria in Egypt on 9 April which killed dozens of worshipers.
- 13 April – Malaysian track cyclist Mohd Azizulhasni Awang brought home the gold medal in keirin at the 2017 Track Cycling World Championships in Hong Kong. He became second Asian medalist brought gold medal.
- 13 April – 11 Malaysians among 300 people listed in Forbes' 30 Under 30 Asia 2017 under the list Retail and E-Commerce category.
- 16 April – The Terengganu health department has confirmed that a pregnant woman was admitted to hospital on 7 April has died from Influenza A virus (H1N1) at 13 April.
- 17 April – The third anniversary of the Malaysia Airlines Flight MH370 crash:
  - The Australian Transport Safety Bureau (ATSB) give warning to staff that leaks of information that pertaining search of MH370 by threatening to jail staff members after having refused to release material pertaining to the search efforts, as requested by families of the Chinese passengers of the ill-fated flight.
- 18 April – Chief of Police Narcotics IPD Baling, Assistant Superintendent Mohd Noor Mat Yaub and his wife died in an accident involving three vehicles in Kampung Teluk Teduri, Baling, Kedah.
- 20 April – Johor Housing and Local Government Committee Exco, Datuk Abd Latif Bandi has resigned from his post with immediate effect after being charged at the Sessions Court with 33 counts of corruption.
- 21 April – Ampang PKR youth chief, Datuk Adam Rosly Abdullah claimed trial to six charges relating to the submission of false statements and forged documents to the Malaysian Anti-Corruption Commission (MACC) at the Sessions Court.
- 24 April – The installation of 15th Yang di-Pertuan Agong Sultan Muhammad V, Sultan of Kelantan at Istana Negara, Jalan Tuanku Abdul Halim, Kuala Lumpur, Malaysia.
- 26 April
  - Fully implementation of the Electronic Toll Collection (ETC) such as Touch 'n Go and SmartTAG at all Malaysian Expressway System.
  - Thaqif Mohamad Amin, a student of tahfiz (religious) school in Kota Tinggi, Johor died at 2:05 pm after a coma a few days because being beaten by wardens.
- 29 April – Three boys found drowned while participating in a school camping resort in Membakut, Beaufort, Sabah.

=== May ===
- 5 May – A camera footage shows 28-year-old man was injured and the car that he was driving, damaged, when he was attacked by several men outside a surau just after Friday prayers concluded at Taman Austin Perdana, Johor Bahru, Johor. Group of men claimed that man driving a car started honking because congregation car blocking his path and disturbed Muslims perform Friday prayers. This incident viral in social media and sparks outrage to public.
- 8 May – Malaysia police have confirmed the death in Syria of Muhammad Wanndy Mohamed Jedi, the Islamic State (IS) terror group's principal coordinator for Malaysia after investigate Facebook posting of his wife on 29 April about Wanndy death in the small town of Ma'adan, Raqqa, Syria.
- 11 May – United Malays National Organisation (UMNO) celebrate 71st anniversary since its founded in 1946:
  - Estimated 140,000 of UMNO members who turned up from all over the country for the party's 71st anniversary celebrations at the Bukit Jalil National Stadium in Bukit Jalil, Kuala Lumpur.
  - UMNO marked its anniversary with a show of strength and solidarity, as Prime Minister, Mohammad Najib Abdul Razak declared the party ready for the 14th general election.
- 12 May – The Sarawak Legislative Assembly voted in favour of a ministerial motion to disqualify Dr. Ting Tiong Choon from the Pujut State Legislative Assembly (DUN) because he had acquired Australian citizenship that disqualify under Article 17(1)(g) of the state constitution.
- 14 May
  - The SMART Tunnel will celebrate its 10th anniversary.
  - Royal Malaysian Customs (RMC) Kuala Lumpur International Airport (KLIA) foiled an attempt to smuggle 330 tortoises worth about RM1.2 million that placed in five boxes carried by Etihad Airways flights from Ivato International Airport, Antananarivo, Madagascar to KLIA.
- 15 May – A man seriously injured in both legs when hit by a homemade bomb believed planted by money lenders or Ah Long in the incident in Jalan Pengkalan Setia, Taman Pengkalan Setia, Taiping, Perak.
- 16 May – WannaCry ransomware attack:
  - CyberSecurity Malaysia confirmed only received one report involving ransomware attack WannaCry so far. This become first reported ransomware attack in Malaysia.
- 17 May – There was commotion occurred at the TN50 dialogue with celebrities when the owner of the production company Metrowealth International Group (MIG) Datuk David Teo slapped by veteran actor Sulaiman Yassin (or better known as Mat Over) reliable for being 'rude' in the presence of unprofessional host Rosyam Nor and Prime Minister Dato' Sri Mohammad Najib Abdul Razak. This incident become viral in social media.
- 18 May
  - RON95 petrol price rise 7 cents to RM2.08 per liter, RON97 increased by 7 per cent to RM2.36, while diesel went up four sen to RM1.99.
  - Malaysia celebrated 100th years of anniversary of palm oil since its introduced in year 1917.
- 20–21 May – 2017 Riyadh summit:
  - Prime Minister Dato' Sri Mohammad Najib Abdul Razak joined US President Donald Trump and more than 50 Muslim leaders for Arab Islamic American Summit in King Abdulaziz Conference Center, Riyadh, Saudi Arabia to aimed at countering global extremism and terrorism.
- 21 May – Kuala Lumpur police launched an e-reporting facility for all the six districts in Kuala Lumpur under the city police headquarters for non-crime related reports.
- 22 May – Royal Malaysian Navy confirmed nine navy personnel have been missing since 20 May after their boat lost contact during a routine patrol in waters off Sedili, Kota Tinggi, Johor but however nine navy have been found safe after search effort.
- 23 May – 2017 Manchester Arena bombing:
  - Prime Minister Dato' Sri Mohammad Najib Abdul Razak has condemned the deadly attack at the Manchester Arena. He said he was appalled by the barbaric and cowardly attack on innocent concertgoers there.
- 24 May – Proton and Geely signed an agreement that would see Geely take a 49.9% stake in Proton and a controlling stake in Lotus, the British sportscar maker, from Proton. Both parties have not finalised the price Geely would pay for the stake in Proton.
- 25 May
  - Two Malaysians are believed to be among 13 suspected Islamic State militants killed late Thursday in battles between the Philippines military and gunmen who have taken over Marawi City in Central Mindanao, Philippines since 23 May.
  - Official opening of the Klang Third Bridge crossed Klang River in Klang, Selangor.
- 25 May – 2017 Jakarta bombings:
  - Prime Minister Dato' Sri Mohammad Najib Abdul Razak condemned the bomb attack at a bus terminal in Kampung Melayu, East Jakarta. "I am disgusted by last night's attack in Jakarta, Indonesia. Malaysians stand with the Indonesian people at this time," he said via his Twitter and Facebook accounts.
- 26 May – Official opening of the Velodrome Nasional, the first indoor cycling track in Malaysia.
- 29 May
  - The High Court set 31 July for case management of Prime Minister Mohammad Najib Abdul Razak's libel suit against former MCA president Ling Liong Sik over an article published in a news portal two years ago.
  - Malaysia Home Ministry issued a show-cause letter to MCA-owned English daily, The Star over its controversial front-page report headlined "Malaysian terrorist leader" above a picture of Muslims praying that published on 27 May.
- 30 May – Assassination of Kim Jong-nam:
  - The magistrate's court ordered the murder case of North Korean Kim Jong-nam to be transferred to the Shah Alam High Court.
- 31 May
  - Malaysia Airlines MH128 forcibly aborted the flight after the alleged hijacking attempt and returned to Melbourne Airport shortly after takeoff. In the incident, a 25-year-old Sri Lankan national who was reportedly drunk, has fished out a large object, claiming it to be a bomb, and attempted to force himself into the plane's cockpit.
  - Official opening of the Pulau Sekati Bridge between Kuala Nerus and Kuala Terengganu, Terengganu.

=== June ===
- 1 June
  - RON95 will cost RM2.10, RON97 will sell at RM2.38, and diesel RM2.02 per litre starting from midnight.
  - The Kelantan State Legislative Assembly Speaker declared that the Nenggiri state legislative assembly seat is vacant. The seat was vacant after its incumbent Mat Yusoff Abdul Ghani became a bankrupt.
  - Seven tahfiz (religious) students were killed and seven others seriously injured when the van they were traveling in was involved in an accident in Jalan Kuala Krai-Kota Bharu in Kampung Telekong, Kuala Krai, Kelantan.
- 1 June – Murder of Zulfarhan Osman Zulkarnain:
  - A University Pertahanan Nasional Malaysia (UPNM) student Zulfarhan Osman Zulkarnain died at the Serdang Hospital, Selangor after suspected there were bruises and scalding marks on his body because of torture. After that, 36 UPNM and University Tenaga Nasional students, aged between 20 and 21 years, have been detained by police in connection with the case. This incident sparks outrage to public.
- 2 June – Prime Minister, Mohammad Najib Abdul Razak announced through Twitter a Special Financial Assistance of RM500 to 1.6 million civil servants and RM250 special assistance will also be enjoyed by pensioners in preparation for Eid al-Fitr.
- 4 June – 2017 London Bridge attack:
  - Prime Minister, Mohammad Najib Abdul Razak condemned the terror attacks in central London where six people had been reported killed. "I am shocked and disgusted. Malaysia condemns such heinous acts and we stand with the people of Britain," Najib said in his latest tweet today. Meanwhile, Wisma Putra has confirmed that no Malaysians were reported involved in the incident and that the matter was being closely monitored.
- 6 June – The board of Felda Global Ventures Holdings Berhad (FGV), the world's third-largest palm plantation operator, suspended its chief executive and chief financial officer it investigates transactions at a subsidiary.
- 7 June – A Malaysian Anti-Corruption Commission saying it will soon investigate several company officials for alleged corruption and abuse of power in the management crisis at Felda Global Ventures Holdings (FGV).
- 8 June
  - Nine Filipinos militants involved in the 2013 Lahad Datu standoff were sentenced to death by the Court of Appeal.
  - Quacquarelli Symonds (QS) World University rankings for 2018 has released report of world university ranking showed five Malaysian universities have emerged among the world's top 300 best universities.
- 9 June
  - A weak earthquake magnitude 3.3 richter scale shook Sandakan, Sabah early morning but no damages were reported.
  - Malaysian Islamic State (ISIS) fighter, identified as Mohd Nizam Ariffin has been killed in clashes with security forces in Mosul, Iraq.
- 9 June – 2016 Sebuyau helicopter crash:
  - Transport ministry's official report says the Filipino pilot of the helicopter which crashed in Sarawak, killing deputy minister Noriah Kasnon, was not familiar with the terrain and that weather conditions were very bad.
- 10 June – Liew Chin Tong Member of Parliament in Kluang and his entourage were chased away from a Ramadan bazaar in Kluang while distributing dates to the public. This incident caught by camera and cause outrage to public.
- 11 June
  - Police detained two men in Johor over an incident on 10 June which Member of Parliament in Kluang Liew Chin Tong was allegedly chased out of a Ramadan bazaar in Bandar Baru Kluang.
  - Singaporean fitness chain True Fitness announced the closure of all its gym and spa facilities in Malaysia because unprofitability and economic condition.
  - Eight people were killed, including six who were burnt in their vehicle when it burst into flames, in an accident involving four vehicles at KM25 Bahau-Keratong Road, Jempol District, Negeri Sembilan.
  - Malaysian swimmer Welson Sim made a record-breaking splash to win the men's 400m freestyle at the Mare Nostrum Tour in Monte Carlo, Monaco and beat the Olympics champion Mack Horton from Australia.
- 12 June
  - The Sarawak state government withdrawn the participation of its representative in Malaysia Tourism Board with immediate effect. The decision was made over the duplication of roles and functions between the state and federal government tourism boards.
  - The Malaysian ambassador to Chile, Datuk Dr. Mohamad Rameez Yahaya and his family were robbed and threatened by a group of five men at his residence in Las Flores Avenue, Las Condes, Santiago, Chile.
- 13 June
  - Royal Malaysian Customs Department officers have foiled an attempt to smuggle 288 kg of pangolin scales valued at RM3.69 million from Ghana to Malaysia.
  - Official opening Nasyrul Quran, the complex for the Quran printing in Putrajaya. This becomes second largest complex for Quran printing in the world after King Fahd Complex in Medina, Saudi Arabia.
- 14 June – An Indonesian cargo ship, KM Avatar, with 15 crew members on-board sank in the Strait of Malacca, 11 nautical miles from Tanjung Kling, Malacca. Malaysian Maritime Enforcement Agency (MMEA) has rescued 13 crew members at 10 am, however, two more are still missing.
- 15 June
  - Two crew members of the cargo ship, KM Avatar who went missing after the ship sank off Tanjung Kling, Malacca on 14 June were found in morning, with one of them dead and the other alive.
  - Six Indonesian crew members are missing when an Equatorial Guinea–registered tanker vessel, MT Putri Sea sank 4.6 nautical miles from Pengerang, Johor at about 5 am due to explosion in its engine room. Malaysian Maritime Enforcement Agency (MMEA) has launched a search and rescue operation has been activated to locate the missing ship crew members.
  - Six students from National Defense University of Malaysia (UPNM) was charged in the Magistrate's Court were alleged killing a Marine Cadet Officers student, Zulfarhan Osman Zulkarnain on 1 June.
  - T. Nhaveen, a bullied victim, who was seriously injured in an assault by a group of boys at Jalan Kaki Bukit in Gelugor, George Town, Penang last Saturday has died. He was believed to be sexually abused and suffered internal bleeding in his head and abdomen. Later, five of the suspects held over the death of T. Nhaveen has arrested to face investigations for murder. This sparks outrage to public, triggered national and international attention and debate about awareness of bullying in Malaysia since another bullied victim Zulfarhan Osman Zulkarnain death on 1 June.
- 15 June – Crash of Hawk 108 fighter jet:
  - The Royal Malaysian Air Force (RMAF) confirmed it has lost contact with one of its aircraft, a Hawk 108 jet trainer, north of Kuantan near the Terengganu–Pahang border. Plane had taken off from the Kuantan air force base at 11 am and lost contact half an hour later at 11:30 am.
  - After five hours missing, two pilots were found dead attached with parachute in a swamp forest in Chukai, Terengganu but aircraft still not found but believe have crashed in the swamp forest in Chukai.
  - Defence Minister, Hishammuddin Hussein has directed the Royal Malaysian Air Force (RMAF) to carry out a detailed investigation into the incident
  - Prime Minister, Mohammad Najib Abdul Razak has conveyed his condolences to the families of the two pilots found dead.
- 16 June – Crash of Hawk 108 fighter jet:
  - The Royal Malaysian Air Force (RMAF) search and rescue (SAR) team recovered the wreckage of the Hawk 108 advanced jet trainer that crashed on 15 June at Kampung Yak Yah in Chukai, Terengganu.
  - The first remains pilot Hawk 108 Major Mohd Hasri Zahari safely buried in Felda Lui Muda, Jempol, Negeri Sembilan meanwhile second remains Major Yazmi Mohamed Yusof safely buried in Titiwangsa Muslims cemetery, Kuala Lumpur, Malaysia.
- 17 June
  - Hundreds of residents from Batu 12 to Batu 23, Hulu Langat, Selangor affected by floods following two-hour of torrential rain this afternoon. Thirty people has evacuated from affected area.
  - The Kuching High Court has ruled against the Sarawak state legislative assembly's decision to disqualify Dr. Ting Tiong Choon as Pujut legislative assemblyman and the Election Commission (EC) has decided there will not be any by-election for Pujut that expected held on 4 July, following the decision by the High Court.
- 18 June – The Royal Malaysian Navy found the wreck of the MT Putri Sea, which is believed to have sunk off Pengerang, Johor on 15 June following an explosion.
- 19 June – Crash of Hawk 108 fighter jet:
  - Two ejection seats and several Hawk 108 pieces was found in operations near Yak Yah, Chukai, Terengganu.
  - The Royal Malaysian Air Force (RMAF) radar detector has the full recording of the Hawk 108 fighter jet crash right up to the final seconds.
- 19 June – World Quran Hour day has held throughout nationwide.
- 20 June – AirAsia has been named the World's Best Low-Cost Airline for the ninth time in a row meanwhile, AirAsia X, AirAsia's long-haul airline, has been named the World's Best Low-Cost Airline Premium Cabin and World's Best Low-Cost Airline Premium Seat awards for the fifth straight year at the 2017 Skytrax World Airline Awards.
- 22 June
  - The price of RON97 decrease to RM2.17 per litre, while RON95 will be RM1.91 per litre. Both are down by seven sen from last week. The price of diesel still same at RM1.88 per litre.
  - Malaysia hockey team successfully defeated India in quarter-finals of the FIH Hockey World League Semi-Finals to book place in 2018 Men Hockey World Cup.
- 24 June
  - NTV7, 8TV and TV9 began its 24-hour transmission.
  - Astro, national direct broadcast satellite introduced special Eid al-Fitr channel, Astro Raya HD for free to Astro B.yond and Astro NJOI subscribers for period of month starting 24 June until 24 July.
  - Prime Minister, Mohammad Najib Abdul Razak condemned terrorist attack in Mecca, Saudi Arabia near Masjid al-Haram through Twitter post expressed his sympathies to the Saudi government and its people and the 11 injured in the incident, which included police officers.
- 25 June – AirAsia X flight D7237 with 359 passengers on board bound for Kuala Lumpur from Perth, Australia returned to Perth Airport due to technical reasons.
- 26 June – Opening of Movie Animation Park Studios in Ipoh, Perak. This become first animation theme park in Asia.
- 27 June – Malindo Air flight from Dhaka, Bangladesh has forcibly returned to Hazrat Shahjalal International Airport due to a cracked windshield.
- 29 June – AirAsia marked history when AirAsia X flight D7001 make a first flight depart from Kuala Lumpur International Airport and landed at Daniel K. Inouye International Airport, Honolulu, Hawaii at 12:30 pm Wednesday (local time).
- 30 June – Former MCA president Ling Liong Sik said his party did not receive any political funding from former prime minister Mahathir Mohamad when he helmed it between 1986 and 2003.

=== July ===
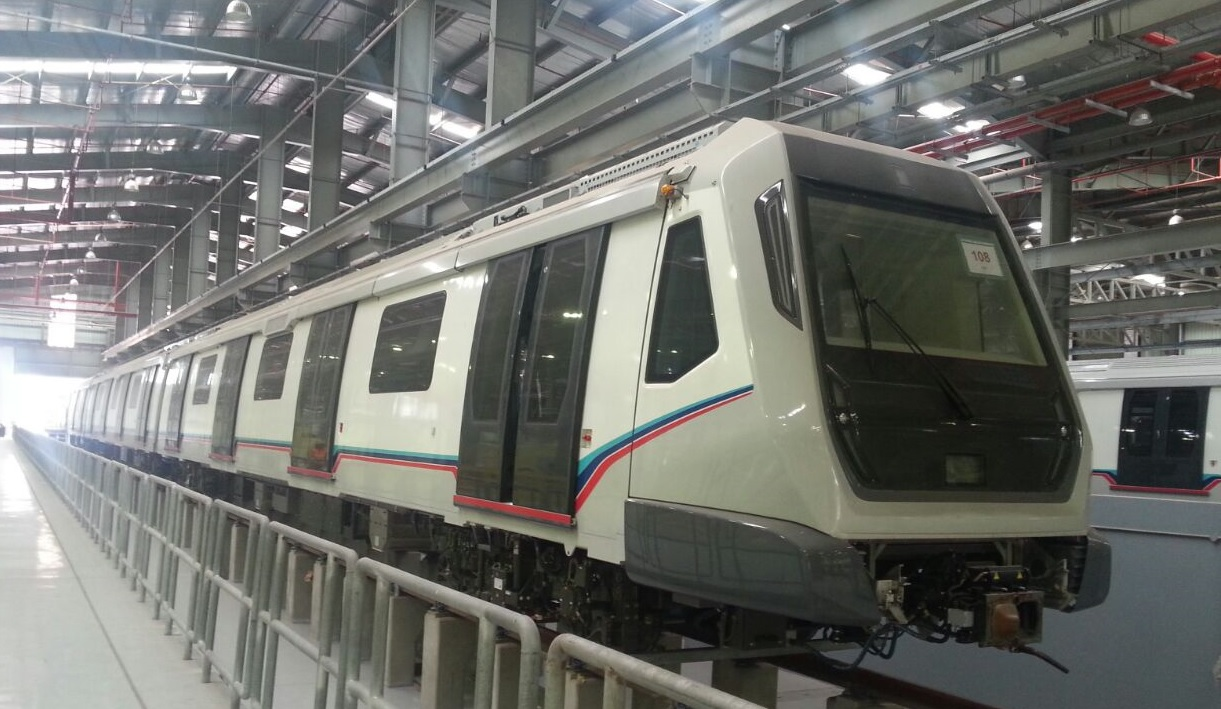
Siemens Inspiro from MRT Sungai Buloh-Kajang Line.

- 1 July
  - All payment card transactions conducted using locally issued payment cards at POS terminals in Malaysia can only be completed with a PIN entry. Signature verification will no longer be facilitated.
  - The Immigration Department arrested 1,035 illegal immigrants and 16 employers throughout the country on the first day of a nationwide Op Mega after the deadline for registration of temporary Enforcement Card (E-Card) expired at 30 June.
  - 1000 villagers were left homeless when a massive fire swept through the Kampung Hidayat squatter settlement in the east coast Tawau district, Sabah.
- 1 July – Sarawak rabies outbreak:
  - Three children including two siblings, in Serian Division district, Sarawak, have been confirmed infected with rabies after entering Sarawak General Hospital on 22 June.
  - The Sabah state government bans entry of all live animals from Sarawak over rabies outbreak.
- 3 July – Sarawak rabies outbreak:
  - The Sarawak state government has approved RM100,000 to enable the immediate purchase rabies vaccines in the wake of the outbreak in the Serian Division district, Sarawak.
- 3 July – Shell has removed life-size promotional standee of a woman at all Shell retails stations throughout Malaysia with immediate effect. This follows the circulation of pictures of several individuals photographed engaging in distasteful and suggestive behaviour with the promotional standee in social media. This incidents sparks outrage to Malaysians.
- 4 July – Sarawak rabies outbreak:
  - Two of the three children who were infected with rabies from Paon Village, Sungai Rimu, Serian Division District, Sarawak since 22 June are pronounced dead.
  - The Sarawak state government declares five villages in the Serian Division District, as areas with rabies infections.
- 4 July – The special criminal court handling cases involving child sexual victims that launched by Prime Minister, Mohammad Najib Abdul Razak on 22 June makes its first inaugural sitting with five cases being heard.
- 5 July – The second anniversary of the Malaysia Airlines Flight MH17 crash:
  - Joint Investigating Team (JIT) namely the Australia, Belgium, Malaysia, Netherlands and Ukraine agreed that the prosecution against those responsible for the shooting of the Malaysia Airlines flight MH17 in Ukraine was carried out in the Netherlands.
- 9 July – Malaysia won 20 gold medals in the 21st World Championships of Performing Arts (WCOPA) that was held in the Long Beach, California, United States.
- 10 July
  - Mohamad Thaqif Amin Mohd Gaddafi, a tahfiz (religious) students dies on April 26 because suspected beating by warden that sparks outrage to public has found died of a disease and not of the alleged beatings against him.
  - Four people were crushed to death when the van they were in collided with a tanker in Lahad Datu, Sabah.
- 11 July – Sarawak rabies outbreak:
  - A fourth case of rabies confirm detected in Ampungan Village, Serian Division District involving a five-year-old girl with a dog-bitten history on 27 May at Saroban Village, Serian District located within a 10 km radius from the village where the third case rabies reported.
  - Royal Malaysia Police made raid and arrested a 54-year-old man, following allegations that he sold dog meat at his food stall which is located on the ground floor of a row of wooden houses at Sibu, Sarawak.
- 12 July – The Kelantan state government has approved public caning with an amendment to the Kelantan Sharia Criminal Procedure Enactment 2002.
- 12 July – Sarawak rabies outbreak:
  - The Sarawak state government has declared Saroban Village, Serian Division District as sixth rabies-infected area.
- 12 July – The second anniversary of the Malaysia Airlines Flight MH17 crash:
  - About 90 of the victims' family members attended a commemoration to mark the anniversary of the disaster, hosted by the Malaysian transport minister, Liow Tiong Lai at Putrajaya, Malaysia.
- 13 July – Sarawak rabies outbreak:
  - The third person infected with rabies from Labor Village, Serian Division, Sarawak died.
  - A six-year-old boy was admitted to the Melaka Hospital with suspected rabies after just getting back from Sarawak and awaiting test results to determine whether or not he has been infected by the virus.
  - The Sarawak state government has declared Tangga Village in Serian Division as rabies-infected area.
- 13 July – The third anniversary of the Malaysia Airlines Flight MH370 crash:
  - Seychelles reported the discovery of two pieces of debris that seemed to be from an aircraft washed up on Farqhar and said it had notified Malaysia.
- 13 July – The Prime Minister's Department announced official date for the birthday celebration of 15th Yang di-Pertuan Agong Sultan Muhammad V of Kelantan has been set on 9 September.
- 14 July – The third anniversary of the Malaysia Airlines Flight MH370 crash:
  - The two pieces of debris found in Seychelles at 13 July are not from MH370.
- 15 July
  - Malaysian Statistics Department has recorded Malaysian population this year is estimated at 32 million, comprising 28.7 million citizens while the rest are non-citizens.
  - Malaysian Paralympics shot put athlete, Muhammad Ziyad Zolkefli won a gold medal and set new world records at World Para Athletics Championships in London, United Kingdom.
- 16 July
  - Malaysian Paralympics men's long jump T20 (learning disability) athlete, Abdul Latif Romly, became second athlete won a gold medal at World Para Athletics Championships in London, United Kingdom.
  - Government of Malaysia strongly condemns Israel's closure of Al-Aqsa. Prime Minister, Mohammad Najib Abdul Razak said at Twitter account, "Malaysia strongly condemn Israel's closure of the Al-Aqsa mosque and denying the rights of the Muslims to perform Friday prayers".
- 17 July
  - The third anniversary of the Malaysia Airlines Flight MH17 crash.
  - Official opening of the Phase 2 of the MRT Kajang Line from Semantan to Kajang. This includes Malaysia's second underground subway, after the LRT Kelana Jaya Line.
- 17 July – Sarawak rabies outbreak:
  - A fourth victim, a five-year-old girl who is a victim of rabies since 11 July died.
- 18 July – Sarawak rabies outbreak:
  - Matang, Perak declares a rabies outbreak area comes after two girls were bitten on 4 July by an infected pet dog in Kuala Sepetang, Perak before it dies eight days later.
  - The Sarawak state government declared three more areas as rabies-infected is Siburan Bazaar and Kampung Temong Mura in Serian Division and Rumah Janta Punggu Mawang in Sri Aman Division.
  - A 52-year-old man from Remun Village becomes the fifth victim of rabies-infected in Serian Division district, Sarawak. He was the first adult rabies victim in this outbreak.
- 18 July
  - Khairul Hafiz Jantan, Malaysian Sprint has broken the 49-year-old record of 20.90 set by Tan Sri Dr. Mani Jegathesan with 20.92 seconds to break the men's 200m national record at the Malaysian Open Athletics Championships at the Bukit Jalil National Stadium in Bukit Jalil, Kuala Lumpur.
  - Prime Minister, Dato' Sri Mohammad Najib Abdul Razak launches the Putrajaya Islamic Complex that places over 11 Islamic government agencies and several other private Islamic groups.
- 18–23 July – Malaysia at the 2017 Commonwealth Youth Games in Nassau, The Bahamas.
- 19 July – Sarawak rabies outbreak:
  - Penang state government bans entry all dogs from Perak and Sarawak.
- 19 July – Ministry of Communications and Multimedia ban the Spanish hit song "Despacito" singing by Puerto Rican singer Luis Fonsi featuring rapper Daddy Yankee from the government-owned Radio Televisyen Malaysia (RTM) television and radio channels with immediate effect, following complaints of sexually charged lyrics.
- 20 July
  - Bukit Jalil National Stadium, Bukit Jalil, Kuala Lumpur nominated at the World Architecture Festival 2017 which will be held in November at Arena Berlin, Germany.
  - Malaysian diver, Cheong Jun Hoong creates history after becoming the first ever Malaysian athlete to secure the gold medal at the International Swimming Federation (Fina) World Championships in Budapest, Hungary. Meanwhile, Prime Minister, Mohammad Najib Abdul Razak and Deputy Prime Minister, Ahmad Zahid Hamidi congratulated to national diver Cheong Jun Hoong through post tweet at Twitter.
- 22 July
  - Football Association of Malaysia (FAM) impose a penalty 18 months ban on Dollah Salleh, Pahang football team coach for criticising the referee following his team's 2–1 defeat to Felda United F.C. on 1 July and also a fine of RM 30,000 due to disparaging remarks in the Malaysia Super League (MSL) match.
  - Malaysian paralympic sprinter, Mohamad Ridzuan Mohamad Puzi won a silver medal in the men's T36 100m final at the World Para Athletics Championships in London, United Kingdom.
  - UMP To Become First University to Offer Railway Technology Studies.
- 23 July – Malaysia U23 national football team qualify for AFC U23 Championship after defeating Mongolia 3–0 in Bangkok, Thailand.
- 23 July – Sarawak rabies outbreak:
  - Sarawak declares two more areas as rabies-infected disease areas: Entubuh Village, Tebedu and Batu 5, Semeba Road in Kuching.
  - A fifth rabies victim, a 52-year-old man from Remun village in Serian Division district, Sarawak died.
- 24 July – Malaysian-born Diana Chan crowned as winner in 2017 MasterChef Australia and walked away with AUD$250,000 (RM 848,642) in prize money, a trophy plus a monthly food column in Delicious magazine.
- 25 July – Sarawak rabies outbreak:
  - Sarawak declared wet market at Sungai Maong and Serikin Village in Bau as rabies-infected area.
- 26 July
  - Tourism tax will not be impose to Malaysians and only will be impose to foreigners.
  - Ministry of Finance estimated net worth of unclaimed monies in Malaysia is RM 5.7 billion since 1977 until 30 June 2017.
  - Former Malaysian Indian Congress (MIC) vice-president, S. Balakrishnan and his son Ashok Kumar was charged at the Malacca Sessions Court with submitting false claims of nearly RM 13 million to the Drainage and Irrigation Department for river restoration works in Malacca five years ago.
  - Asian Football Confederation (AFC) has awarded Malaysia as the next host of the AFC U-17 Asian Cup which will be held in 2018 between 20 September and 7 October.
- 27 July
  - RON 95 increase by RM2.03 per litre, while RON 97 increase by RM2.28 per litre. Both price increases by six sen. Diesel prices increase by three sen to RM1.99 per litre.
  - Dewan Rakyat has passed amendments Land Public Transport Act 2010 and the Commercial Vehicles Licensing Board Act 1987 step to legalising ridesharing companies.
- 28 July
  - Singaporean-born singer, Aliff Aziz was arrested by police for allegedly injuring his wife, Bella Astillah, who had just 20 days to give birth a baby boy after occurred a fight in a karaoke center in Taman Shamelin, Cheras, Kuala Lumpur.
  - Greenpeace launched its first office in Malaysia located at Jalan Tun Sambathan, Brickfields, Kuala Lumpur.
- 29 July
  - Two unidentified men shot and wounded the driver of former attorney-general Abdul Gani Patail at the victim's house in Ampang Perdana.
  - Government of Malaysia condemned the missile attack on Mecca launched by Shia Islam Houthis and hopes that the perpetrators will be brought to justice.
  - Deputy Prime Minister, Ahmad Zahid Hamidi ordered the Ministry of Domestic Trade, Cooperatives and Consumerism to end the contract of the operator of the 1Malaysia People's Shop (KR1M), because operator were found to sell goods higher than the market price.
  - Singaporean-born singer, Aliff Aziz who was detained on Friday for allegedly assaulting his wife Bella Astillah at a karaoke centre is set to be released on bail.
- 30 July – Leong Jun Hao, badminton junior player make history when winning men's singles title at the Badminton Asian Junior Championships in Jakarta, Indonesia. Prime Minister, Mohammad Najib Abdul Razak congratulated Leong Jun Hao for winning.
- 31 July
  - Prime Minister, Mohammad Najib Abdul Razak announced five new schemes for Malaysian Armed Forces (ATM) veterans and RM5 million for warriors' fund.
  - A former CEO of Felda Investment Corporation Sdn Bhd (FIC) was arrested by Malaysian Anti-Corruption Commission (MACC) to allow investigations into FIC's purchase of a high-end property in Kensington, London, United Kingdom between year 2013 and 2015, for a total of £60 million (RM330 million).
  - Official opening of hotel resort Lexis Hibiscus, Port Dickson, Negeri Sembilan. This hotel resort one of the largest number of swimming pools in the world.

=== August ===
- 1 August
  - The tourism tax which is set to see rates fixed and charged on a per-room, per-night basis, with the amount subject to the rating of the hotel for a night's stay will be enforced. Initially, tourism tax went to be enforced on 1 July but deferred to 1 August because of dispute between Sarawak and Sabah State Government and Minister of Tourism and Culture, Mohamed Nazri Abdul Aziz.
  - Official opening of the Abu Bakar Maritime Base in Middle Rocks near dispute area with Singapore in Pedra Branca.
- 3 August – RON 97 petrol price increase 4 sen to RM2.32 per liter, RON 95 increase 4 sen to RM2.07 per liter while diesel increase 6 sen to RM2.05.
- 4 August – Penang state government signs corruption-free pledge with the Malaysian Anti-Corruption Commission (MACC) in a ceremony at Komtar, George Town, Penang. Penang become 11th state sign corruption-free pledge, only left Selangor and Kelantan doesn't sign it.
- 5 August – Malaysian popular singer, Yunalis Zara'ai officially safe engaged with local director, Adam Sinclair in private ceremony at Shah Alam, Selangor.
- 6 August – Chief Minister of Sarawak, Datuk Abang Johari Openg officially announced the formation of the Sarawak wholly owned oil and gas company, Petros company.
- 7 August – Raline Shah, Indonesian actress appointed by CEO and founder AirAsia Group, Tony Fernandes as director of Indonesia AirAsia.
- 8–9 August – United States Secretary of States, Rex Tillerson made visit to Malaysia and meet Prime Minister, Mohammad Najib Abdul Razak and Deputy Prime Minister, Ahmad Zahid Hamidi.
- 8 August
  - Beginning the first session of the Royal Commission of Inquiry (RCI) on the foreign exchange (forex) losses suffered by Bank Negara Malaysia in the 1990s.
  - ASEAN celebrate its 50th (Golden Jubilee) anniversary of foundation.
  - Official opening of the Malaysian International Trade and Exhibition Centre (MITEC).
- 8 August – Sarawak rabies outbreak:
  - A seven-year-old boy from Kuala Village, Gedong, Samarahan Division, Sarawak is identified as the sixth human infected by rabies.
- 9 August – Sarawak rabies outbreak:
  - Sarawak declares Kula Village, Serian District as a rabies-infected area.
- 9 August – Groundbreaking ceremony MRL East Coast Rail Link (ECRL) project by Prime Minister, Mohammad Najib Abdul Razak.
- 10 August
  - U.S. Justice Department says conducting a criminal probe into 1MDB.
  - Dewan Rakyat passed 3 bills act namely Law Reform (Marriage and Divorce) (Amendment) Bill 2017, Prevention of Crime Act 1959 (Amendment) Bill 2017 and Malaysia Border Control Agency (AKSEM) Bill 2017.
  - A father faces 594 sodomy charges against his 15-year-old son at the Child Sexual Crimes Sessions Court. He was charged with committing the abusive act three times a day including also made every day in Ramadan and first day of Eid al-Fitr. This case has attract the nationwide and international and this is the worst case ever reported by journalist and court.
- 12 August
  - Penang Exco, Phee Boon Poh and two directors was arrested by Malaysian Anti Corruption Commission (MACC) to investigate the connection an operation illegal carbon filter processing factory.
  - Thousands of Muslims gathering in Pray For Malaysia event part of National Day and Malaysia Day celebrations in Dataran Putra, Putrajaya.
  - Ribena, local famous blackcurrant drink recalled five product through nationwide after claimed manufacturer error on the product.
- 13 August
  - Earthquake of magnitude 6.5 richter scale struck west of Indonesia's in Sumatra. The tremors can felt until Johor Bahru, Johor and Singapore.
  - Nothing To Hide 2.0 forum held by Parti Pribumi Bersatu Malaysia turn violence when several youths throw chairs, shoes and make riot when former Prime Minister, Mahathir Mohamad speech at the stage after audience questioning about Memali incident. Police arrested two men connection with incident.
- 14 August – Princess Tunku Tun Aminah, daughter of Sultan of Johor, Sultan Ibrahim, safely married with Dutchman, Dennis Muhammad Abdullah in private ceremony at Istana Bukit Serene, Johor Bahru, Johor.
- 16 August – Kelantan state government sign corruption-free pledge with the Malaysian Anti-Corruption Commission (MACC) in a ceremony at Kota Bharu, Kelantan. Kelantan become 12th state sign the pledge after Penang, only left Selangor doesn't sign it.
- 19 August – Opening ceremony of the 2017 SEA Games:
  - This is 29th SEA Games edition and sixth time Malaysia host the games and its first time since 2001. Previously, Malaysia also hosted the 1965, 1971, 1977 and 1989 editions of the games.
  - Opening ceremony took place in Bukit Jalil National Stadium at National Sports Complex, Bukit Jalil, Kuala Lumpur starting at 18:00 MST (UTC+08:00). Estimated 80,000 spectators has filled up the stadium and broadcast throughout nationwide and elsewhere in Southeast Asia countries. The games officially opened by Yang di-Pertuan Agong, Sultan Muhammad V of Kelantan with "I declare open the Kuala Lumpur 29th Southeast Asian Games."
  - Opening ceremony is enlivened with school band displays and a show by the Malaysian Armed Forces, parade of nation by 11 Southeast Asia countries competed, singing performance by Malaysian singer, Dayang Nurfaizah, Mia Palencia, M. Nasir, Monoloque and Azlan Typewriter and showcase of Malaysia's cultural diversity that came in four segments — Provenance, Similarities in Diversity, Together We are Stronger, and A Nation Built on Inclusion.
  - Finally, Malaysian diving, Nur Dhabitah Sabri, lit the cauldron with a torch marks beginning this 29th edition. The opening ceremony's concluded at 11:00 MST.
- 21 August – A United States warship, USS John S. McCain (DDG-56) collided with Liberian-flagged Alnic MC oil tanker near Singapore–Malaysia territorial dispute waters cause ten sailors are missing and five were injured. Malaysia deployed 4 asset to help search and rescue effort with Singapore.
- 30 August – Thousands of Rohingyas refugees make protest against atrocities on Rohingyas in Rakhine state, Myanmar in front of the Myanmar Embassy located along Jalan Ampang Hilir at Taman U Thant, Kuala Lumpur. Police arrested 44 Rohingya protesters over this illegal rally.
- 30 August – Closing ceremony of the 2017 SEA Games:
  - Closing ceremony took place in Bukit Jalil National Stadium at National Sports Complex, Bukit Jalil, Kuala Lumpur starting at 21:00 MST (UTC+08:00). Estimated thousand spectators has filled up the stadium and broadcast throughout nationwide and elsewhere in Southeast Asia countries.
  - Closing ceremony is begun with military band performance, accompanied by a bevy of Rimau mascots playing the drums, parade of nation by 11 Southeast Asia countries competed and volunteers of SEA Games marching. Finally, the closing ceremony officially closed by Prime Minister, Mohammad Najib Abdul Razak with "I declare the KL 29th SEA Games closed and I call upon the youths of the Southeast Asian countries to assemble two years from now at the Philippines to celebrate the 30th SEA Games". Then, Malaysia extinguished cauldron flame and handed the SEA Games federation flag over to the Philippines.
  - Malaysia emerging as the overall champion with 145 gold, 92 silver and 86 bronze medals surpassed the total medals in 2001 SEA Games.
- 31 August
  - World Quran Hour has held through nationwide.
  - Malaysia celebrate 60th anniversary Diamond Jubilee of the independence day.

=== September ===
- 1 September – Bahasa Malaysia (Malay Language) celebrate its 50th anniversary (Golden Jubilee) of the National Language of Malaysia.
- 4 September – Datuk Seri Mohamad Fuzi Harun appointed as 11th Inspector-General of Police replacing Tan Sri Khalid Abu Bakar effective 4 September.
- 5 September
  - Former 10th Inspector-General of Police, Tan Sri Khalid Abu Bakar appointed as new chairman of Prasarana Malaysia Berhad.
  - Malaysia government summoned Myanmar's ambassador to express displeasure over violence of Rohingya in Myanmar's Rakhine State.
- 6 September – Astro Awani, Malaysian popular news channel celebrate 10th anniversary.
- 7 September – A group of Paralympian cyclist were injured in a suspected hit-and-run accident during training for preparation 2017 ASEAN Para Games in Kuala Lumpur–Kuala Selangor Expressway (LATAR) near Templer, Selangor.
- 8 September – Malaysian Communication and Multimedia Commission blocked access to Steam, the world largest online games provider after provider failed to remove controversial games "Fight of Gods" a combat game featuring Jesus Christ and Buddha among others within 24 hours after given warning by government. The blocked has lifted in next day after Steam finally remove the controversial games.
- 9 September
  - Malaysia government launch humanitarian aid mission to Bangladesh to help Rohingya refugees caught in Myanmar's internal conflict in Rakhine State.
  - Prime Minister, Mohammad Najib Abdul Razak says Rohingya ethnic face systematic atrocities including torture, rape and murder in Myanmar.
- 10 September – About 1,000 women, including politicians and women's rights activists, gathered at a rally in the Kuala Lumpur to protest against the country's "toxic politics".
- 11 September – Death of Sultan Abdul Halim Mu'adzam Shah of Kedah:
  - Sultan Abdul Halim Mu'adzam Shah, the 28th Sultan of Kedah, 5th and 14th Yang di-Pertuan Agong (1970–1975; 2011–2016) died at age 89.
  - Sultan Abdul Halim Mu'adzam Shah died at 2:30 pm in Istana Anak Bukit, Alor Setar, Kedah.
  - Prime Minister, Deputy Prime Minister and politicians expressed sadness and conveyed a condolences over the death of Sultan of Kedah.
  - Prime Minister, Mohammad Najib Abdul Razak has requested that the flag of Malaysia will be flown at half-mast throughout the country for two days.
  - The state flag of Kedah will be flown at half-mast for three days from today would be mourning period of mourning would be for seven days.
  - Menteri Besar of Kedah, Ahmad Bashah Md Hanipah declare a public holiday in Kedah on 12 September.
- 12 September – Death of Sultan Abdul Halim Mu'adzam Shah of Kedah:
  - Estimated thousand of people and dignitaries walks of life thronged Istana Anak Bukit to pay their last respects to the late Sultan of Kedah at the lying-in-state at Dewan Penghadapan.
  - The paying of last respects by for public was held from 11:00 am to 12:30 pm. Dignitaries paid their last respects from 12:30 pm to 1:30 pm.
  - Singapore Acting President J. Y. Pillay and Prime Minister Lee Hsien Loong have written to the Sultanah of Kedah, Tuanku Sultanah Hajah Haminah to convey their condolences on the passing of her husband.
  - Sultan Abdul Halim Mu'adzam Shah's remains buried at the Kedah Royal Mausoleum in Langgar, Kedah. His remains were safely buried around 5:15 pm.
  - Tunku Sallehuddin Ibni Almarhum Sultan Badlishah, was proclaimed as 29th Sultan of Kedah, the younger brother of Sultan Abdul Halim Mu'adzam Shah.
- 12 September – Prime Minister, Mohammad Najib Abdul Razak has met United States President, Donald Trump at White House, Washington, D.C.. He became the second Southeast Asian leader to meet 45th US president on US soil.
- 14 September – 2017 Darul Quran Ittifaqiyah madrasa fire:
  - 23 people, most of them students, were killed in a fire that broke out at Darul Quran Ittifaqiyah, a tahfiz (religious) school in Datuk Keramat, Kuala Lumpur. This is worst fire tragedy in 2 decades since 1989 Kedah Madrasah Fire.
  - Fire and Rescue Department of Malaysia said the school caught fire at about 5:15 am. The blaze began in the sleeping quarters on the top floor of the three-storey school building. Seven people were taken to a nearby hospital for injuries, while 11 others were rescued. Many victims could not escape because of only one entrance and metal grills on window.
  - Prime Minister, Mohammad Najib Abdul Razak has expressed his condolences over this incident through Twitter post.
  - Many politicians and royalty express their condolences for the victims.
  - Former Prime Minister, Mahathir Mohamad visit the survivor victims at Hospital Kuala Lumpur and said no lessons learnt from 1989 fire tragedy.
- 15 September – 2017 Darul Quran Ittifaqiyah madrasa fire:
  - Fire and Rescue Department of Malaysia's investigation found that fires were not caused by short circuit. The investigation of the Forensic Unit and the Energy Commission confirmed the condition of the electrical circuit at the main switch of the central building was in good condition and suspected possibility of arson attempt.
  - All 23 victims have been successfully identified via DNA testing.
  - Eleven of the 23 students and teachers who perished in the fire have been laid to rest at the Raudhatul Sakinah Cemetery in Taman Batu Muda, Batu Caves, Gombak, Selangor.
  - Chief Islamic Consumers Association of Malaysia (PPIM), Datuk Nadzim Johan, said CCTV at the PPIM office showed a man who climbed a fence before entering into a premises adjacent to the religious center.
- 16 September – 2017 Darul Quran Ittifaqiyah madrasa fire:
  - Deputy Prime Minister, Ahmad Zahid Hamidi assures no one will be free if there is any element of arson in the incident.
  - Yang di-Pertuan Agong, Sultan Muhammad V of Kelantan expressed sympathy and visited the site of the fire which broke out at the Darul Quran Ittifaqiyah accompanied by Prime Minister, Mohammad Najib Abdul Razak and wife, Rosmah Mansor.
  - Police arrested seven teenage boys in connection with the fire at Darul Quran Ittifaqiyah school. They were charged with murder.
- 16 September
  - Estimated Disney announced Club Mickey Mouse in Malaysia aired on Disney Channel, except Natasya because it replaced by Ellya.
  - Malaysia celebrates 54th anniversary of its formation.
- 17 September – Kuala Lumpur City Hall (DBKL) confirmed it has rejected the organisers' application to hold The Better Beer Festival.
- 17 September – Opening ceremony of the 2017 ASEAN Para Games:
  - The opening ceremony was held in Bukit Jalil National Stadium 20:17 MST (UTC+8) by Prime Minister, Mohammad Najib Abdul Razak.
- 23 September – Closing ceremony of the 2017 ASEAN Para Games:
  - The closing ceremony was held in Bukit Jalil National Stadium at 20:30 MST (UTC+8) and closed by Deputy Prime Minister, Ahmad Zahid Hamidi.
  - Malaysia emerging as the second champion behind Indonesia with 90 gold, 85 silver and 83 bronze medals.
- 24 September – A self-service launderette in Muar, Johor adopts Muslims-only policy, the owner put an 'Only For Muslims' sign in front of shop and picture went viral on social media. The picture received mixed reactions from netizens, with some praising the move and others questioning the motive for segregating customers based on their religious backgrounds.
- 28 September – Wisma Putra banned citizens from travelling to North Korea cited North Korea's missile tests and related developments. This prompted postpone for the third time an AFC Asian Cup qualifier match between Malaysia and North Korea scheduled for 5 October in Pyongyang, North Korea.
- 29 September – 2017 Darul Quran Ittifaqiyah madrasa fire:
  - 2 suspected teen was charged with murder court. Both pleaded guilty.
- 29 September
  - A film by Skop Production company, Abang Long Fadil 2, took the RM17.8 million collection, breaking the record of the highest ticket sales and highest Malaysian films surpassing Polis Evo.
  - Four families were killed in an accident at Jalan Gua Musang–Kuala Krai near Paloh Land Development Plan after hit rice trailers. Later, the trailers driver was positive drug testing.
  - Two members of the Royal Malaysian Navy (RMN) died at the Sungai Wangi Unit Detention Room, Sitiawan, Perak after both of them undergo physical training according to the procedure. Later, police classifies as a murder case.
  - Youth and Sports Minister, Khairy Jamaluddin ordered to pay RM150,000 in compensation to Anwar Ibrahim after the Kuala Lumpur High Court ruled that he had defamed the PKR Chairman.
- 30 September – A Malaysian student, Syahirah Amiruddin, was killed in a road accident in Carima village, Bone district, located 130 kilometers from Makassar, in South Sulawesi, Indonesia.

=== October ===
- 1 October – Max Verstappen win of the final Malaysian Grand Prix at Sepang, Selangor. This is final race for Petronas Malaysian Grand Prix edition.
- 3 October
  - The 10th anniversary of the first Malaysian angkasawan (astronaut), Sheikh Muszaphar Shukor to the International Space Station (ISS).
  - Police arrested actor and managing director of DBI Properties, Datuk Nuruliman A Rahman or better known as Boy Iman and two suspect in Ampang and Setapak to assist in the investigation of housing sales scams involving RM6.2 million. This detention sparks various netizen reactions in social media.
- 6 October – Jamal Yunos, politician and "Red Shirts" leader broke 10 boxes containing 100 bottles of beer outside the Selangor secretariat's building as a symbol of protest against any attempt to hold a beer festival in the state. Later, police arrested him for participating in an illegal assembly and causing nuisance to the public.
- 8 October – Malaysians and former drug mules, Shyzlin Hataman who were sentenced to four years in Peru, died at age 43. He died before he could return to Malaysia.
- 10 October – Three workers were seriously injured in a work site after explosion from old World War II bomb while carrying out housekeeping work at the Bandar Malaysia Mass Rapid Transit station site. Later, one of workers suddenly died in next day.
- 11 October – Zamihan Mat Zin, Islamic preacher arrested by police under Sedition Act 1948 over viral video depicts Zamihan allegedly saying it was wrong Sultan of Johor, Sultan Ibrahim to prohibit a Muslim-only laundrette from operating in the state and labelled Chinese people as being "unhygienic". The video sparks outrage to public. Later, he was freed under police custody.
- 14 October – A light aircraft crashed into Sungai Rambai, Malacca killed the pilot while one passengers is injured.
- 15 October – Thousands of people attended "Love Malaysia, Eliminate Kleptocracy" rally organise by Pakatan Harapan party at Padang Timur, Petaling Jaya, Selangor despite poor turnout and warning by police.
- 15–16 October – Emir of Qatar, Sheikh Tamim bin Hamad Al Thani make two day state visit to Malaysia.
- 16 October – A Malaysian died after believed to have been hit by a bullet that fired four gunmen at the checkpoint at Kampung Cek He, Tak Bai district, Thailand.
- 17 October
  - Two were killed while 10 others injured including two serious injuries in a car collided with a van at Jalan Sungai Petani towards Tikam Batu, Kedah.
  - Chief executive officer (CEO) of Malaysia Airlines, Peter Bellew resigned from his position and return to Ryanair as Chief Operations Officer (COO).
- 19 October – Philippines government said Malaysian lecturer and militant Dr. Mahmud Ahmad is believed to have been killed in Marawi in southern Philippines.
- 21 October – Estimated 14 people feared in buried while two workers found dead in construction site landslide in Tanjong Bungah, Penang.
- 24 October – 8 people dead while 35 injured in horror collision between two factory buses and a factory van near the Juru toll plaza in Bukit Mertajam, Seberang Perai, Penang.

=== November ===
- 5–13 November – Penang and some parts of Kedah hit by flash flood. This is a worst floods in Penang history. Seven people dead in this disasters and 10,000 victims evacuated from disasters area.
- 16 November – Opening of IKEA Malaysia's third store in Desa Tebrau, Johor Bahru, Johor.
- 19 November – The third-generation Perodua Myvi is officially launched.
- 20 November – A man suspected to be feeling pressure after the death of his wife earlier this month, kills her three young children before hanging herself in a two-storey residence at Lot 88 in Sungai Petani, Kedah.
- 22 November – Three Sabah Electricity Sdn Bhd (SESB) personnel were seriously injured while three others were injured when their substations were burned at the Api-Api Complex, Kota Kinabalu, Sabah.
- 29 November – 2017 Darul Quran Ittifaqiyah madrasa fire:
  - A 12-year-old boy and a 16-year-old boy who had been arrested over the case of the fire was released from alleged drug addiction.
- 30 November – Malaysia Airlines receives first order from six new Airbus A350-900 aircraft in Kuala Lumpur International Airport.

=== December ===
- 1 December – The sale of alcoholic beverage is restricted to non-Muslims above 21 years of age from the current 18.
- 4 December – The Melaka Monorail returned to operation after four years of halted.
- 6 December – Miss Tourism International 2017–2018 Beauty Pageant.
- 8 December – Thousands of people gathered in front of the United States embassy in Jalan Tun Razak, Kuala Lumpur to protest against the United States government's move to recognise Jerusalem as Israel's capital.
- 8 December – Actress and host Neelofa has been appointed as a new independent non-executive director at AirAsia.
- 9 December – The Malaysian NGO Association chairman, Jamal Yunos was detained by a team of police officers at the Kuala Lumpur Police Contingent Headquarters at Putra World Trade Center (PWTC) believed to threaten DAP politician, Datuk Zaid Ibrahim.
- 11 December – Minister in the Prime Minister's Department, Dato' Seri Jamil Khir Baharom announced the Federal Territory Mosque as an 'adopted mosque' to Al-Aqsa as a sign of solidarity to the Al-Aqsa Mosque which is now facing a threat following the US decision to recognize Jerusalem as the capital of Israel.
- 12 December
  - Ivana Esther Robert Smit, a Dutch-born model found dead in a nude state as a fall from the balcony of a 20-story apartment in the Kuala Lumpur.
  - Five families including a baby boy were killed after their car collided with an express bus at Kilometer 176 Jalan Segamat-Labis near Kampung Melayu Raya, Segamat, Johor.
- 13 December
  - McDonald's Malaysia lodged a police report at the Dang Wangi Police Station, against more than 20 individuals and organizations who made false charges and called for boycotting fast food restaurants because connection with financing funds to Israel.
  - Five were killed in a fire at 5 am at the nursing home center of Novel Care Home Centre in Bandar Sungai Long, Kajang, Selangor.
- 14 December – Dewan Negara approves the Financial Bill 2017 to amend the Income Tax Act 1967, the Real Property Gains Tax Act 1976, the Goods and Services Tax Act 2014 and the Financial Act 2013.
- 15 December – UNIC, the nasyid group was detained by the Syrian authorities due to SOP problems.
- 19 December – Seremban Magistrate's Court released a teacher, Azizan Manap or also known as Cikgu Azizan from a charged with deliberately causing injuries to the left cheek of an 11-year-old boy student, in front of school gathering site at 7 am, 6 April ago. This case received netizen attention and most netizens condemned the parent's action for file a suit against Cikgu Azizan.
- 21 December – Malaysia joined more than 120 countries voting in favour of a UN General Assembly resolution calling for the United States to drop its recognition of Jerusalem as Israel's capital, ignoring a threat by US President Donald Trump to cut off financial aid to countries voting against his move.
- 22 December – Prime Minister, Mohammad Najib Abdul Razak led thousands of protester in a rally to show solidarity with Palestinians, protest against the United States decision to recognise Jerusalem as Israel's capital.
- 31 December – Visit ASEAN Year 2017 will officially end.

== National Day and Malaysia Day ==
=== Theme ===
Negaraku Sehati Sejiwa (My Country, United and Unified)

=== National Day parade ===
Merdeka Square, Kuala Lumpur

=== Malaysia Day celebration ===
Merdeka Square, Kota Kinabalu, Sabah

== Sports ==
- 22 February – 1 March – 2017 Tour de Langkawi.
- 20 January – 20 October – 2017 Malaysia Premier League.
- 20 January – 21 October – 2017 Malaysia Super League.
- 29 April – 6 May – 2017 Sultan Azlan Shah Cup
- 5 February – 20 May – 2017 Malaysia FA cup.
- 4 July – 28 October – 2017 Malaysia Cup
- 19–30 August – 29th SEA Games.
- 17–23 September – 9th ASEAN Para Games.
- 29 September – 1 October - 2017 Petronas Malaysian Grand Prix.
- 12–15 October – 2017 CIMB Classic.
- 27–29 October – 2017 Shell Malaysia Motorcycle Grand Prix.
- 26 November – 2017 Penang Bridge International Marathon

== Births ==
- 14 October – Tunku Iskandar Abdul Jalil Abu Bakar Ibrahim – Raja Muda of Johor

== Deaths ==
- 11 January – Adenan Satem – 5th Chief Minister of Sarawak.
- 1 March – Tan Sri Datuk Jins Shamsuddin – Malaysian actor, director and politician.
- 19 May – Cheung Ah Wah – Leader of the Sarawak People's Guerilla Force (SPGF).
- 1 June – Zulfarhan Osman Zulkarnian – National Defence University of Malaysia.
- 3 June – Rehman Rashid - Writer and journalist.
- 9 August – Kerk Kim Hock – Politician and former secretary of general Democratic Action Party (DAP).
- 11 September – Sultan Abdul Halim Mu'adzam Shah – 28th Sultan of Kedah, 5th and 14th Yang di-Pertuan Agong (1970–1975; 2011–2016).
- 10 October – Kassim Ahmad – Malay scholar and intellectual.
- 18 October – Yeoh Tiong Lay – Billionaire businessman.
- 26 December – Shahnon Ahmad – Writer.

== See also ==
- 2017
- 2016 in Malaysia | 2018 in Malaysia
- History of Malaysia
- List of Malaysian films of 2017
