= 2017 Mengalum Island boat accident =

Boat accident in 2017

Mengalum Island boat accident
- Date: 28 January 2017
- Location: South China Sea (off Mengalum Island, Sabah, Malaysia)
- Cause: Boat overloaded beyond specified capacity combined with poor weather conditions
- Participants: 27 tourists 3 crew members
- Outcome: Sinking of the catamaran boat
- Deaths: 4
- Missing: 5
- Convicted: 3
- Charges: 2

The Mengalum Island boat accident is occurred on 28 January 2017, when a catamaran passenger ferry sank in the South China Sea off Mengalum Island in Sabah, Malaysia. The boat was carrying 27 Chinese tourists, of whom 22 (including two boat crewmen) were rescued, four confirmed dead, and five (including one boat crewman) still missing.

== Background ==
The boat left Sabah's capital, Kota Kinabalu on the morning of 28 January to Mengalum Island (an island located around 60 kilometres (38 miles) west of the city). The island is known as a favourite destination for Chinese tourists especially for Chinese New Year. Due to the rough sea condition at the time, the boat was reported missing about 12 hours later with the Sabah local police said there are 27 Chinese tourists with three crew members, rather than 28 tourists as disclosed earlier as one passenger cancelling his trip in the last minute. Due to an error of duplicate name in the passenger list, the identity of two duplicate names is identified as a woman and a child and were part of the Chinese tourists group. Both have entering the boat without registering their identities.

The boat captain and one crew member were rescued by another tourist boat on 29 January afternoon after they floating in the sea for a day. While a fishermen boat found the 20 Chinese tourists along with the three that are confirmed dead some hours later, comprising two men and a woman. All survivors were sunburned and dehydrated. Local authorities said the Chinese tourist survivors has been adrift in the sea for 10–30 hours but did not give any explanation for the cause of the tragedy. The official later explain that the boat went down after being hit by heavy waves and the tourists were swept away by the current. According to one survivor, Fan Li Xia, she and other passengers held onto the body of a dead friend for as long as they could while treading water. She recount:

The tourists, who had life jackets on, were swept away by the current and struggled in the cold water for more than 30 hours. If we were found any later, I don't think I would have survived. My friend died. We dragged his body around for half a day, but we couldn't manage any more so we had to let it go.

— Fan Li Xia, one of the Catamaran mishap survivor.

Another female survivor, Yang Yao Ru recount they shared the little food they had and urged everyone to stay alive. Telling the other survivors huddled together to try to shake off the cold and did not loosen their grip. She also added that if she died at the time, her mother also wouldn't have survived by herself, which increase her hope to stay alive to bring her mother home safely. Most of the survivors are treated in the Queen Elizabeth Hospital in Kota Kinabalu and were traumatised over the incident with counselors and psychiatrists have been appointed to help them. The authorities also explained to media that the chance to get the remaining missing victims alive are decreasing as the life vests they wearing cannot last up to six days in addition to the extreme cold and heat in the sea.

According to a licensed local boat operator in Sabah, the blame should be put into cheap Chinese online internet purchases and Sabah cowboy boat operators, calling any relevant quarters in China and Sabah to rectify things at both ends to minimise any recurrence. He said:

Those who buy these bargain optional tours in China are unsuspecting. They don't know what product they are buying. They think it's above board since it is online booking, they think they are getting proper licensed boats. The truth is the big sea and big waves whipped up by northeast monsoon winds can scare the pants out of anybody put into tiny boats that are totally unfit for taking tourists out to big seas. We have complained before, we sent pictures but nobody took action and now when deaths occur people jump. It's very, very scary for anybody when it's big sea, rough sea in those small boats, it's no joke. As for the cowboy boat operators in Sabah, if one doesn't take the offer, others will and so the seller in China need not worry about transport. Cowboy operators are unlike us who abide by many strict rules and regulations, they cram as many as possible.

— Unnamed licensed Sabah boat operator.

This was however refuted by the Chinese Consul General in Sabah, stating that the tour packages brought by their tourists from China are from proper channels and none of them knew the jetty they used in Sabah is illegal. Based on a discovery by Sabah local newspaper of Daily Express, the catamaran boat has a "history of problems". The boat was designed and built in 2007–2008 for a research project in eastern Sabah waters of Semporna belonged to the World Wildlife Fund (WWF), with a local name of "kahumbu" in Bajau language. The catamaran had been damaged during the project and forced to beach land as it almost sank near Pom Pom Island as the boat was only designed to face the wave in Semporna waters but not the big waves in Mengalum Island waters. According to the organisation's former project officer, Daniel Doughty, "to convert the boat as passenger boat with 30 pax and ply it to Mengalum is a suicide". This was also supported by a local diver after he been asked and shown a picture of the catamaran boat. In his statement, the diver said:

I saw the catamaran being towed after water had leaked into its hull while carrying passengers to Sapi Island sometime last year. Fortunately it managed to reach shore on time before the situation got any worse. I was diving in the area when I saw the catamaran being towed back to Jesselton Point. I learned later that water had been leaking into the hull. Passengers of the catamaran were safely dropped off on the island and had to be picked up by another boat sent by their handling tour agent. The catamaran experienced such problem not once but twice, the second time also last year.

— Unnamed local diver.

== Victims ==
Three deaths are confirmed and five people are missing during the mishap on 28 January. One male passenger cancels his trip before the boat depart. On 31 January, the number of missing victims are revised to six (including one boat crewman) from earlier reports which stated there are two passenger with duplicate names. One missing victim are found on 4 February are confirmed as one of the unidentified woman passenger (later identified as Yang Jia Yi).

All are Chinese tourists except where noted.

Dead
He Run Yuan (46, male)
Xie Luo (48, male)
Zhang Xiao Kun (27, female)
Yang Jia Yi (38, female)
Missing
Dong Mei (52, female)
Li Yu Xuan (10, female)
Luo Hong Yuan (51, male)
Sheng Jiang Jian (50, male)
Absoy Kasim (26, male, Malaysian crew member)

== Search and rescue operations ==
Two of the surviving crews were found in the waters between the island of Tiga and an offshore oil drilling platform. 22 tourists were subsequently rescued by local fishermen, with three victims confirmed as dead. Most of the victims are found in weak conditions with they being huddling together in rough waters in their life vests and forming human chains. All rescued victims are sent to the Queen Elizabeth Hospital in Kota Kinabalu for further treatment. The Malaysian Maritime Enforcement Agency (MMEA) said the search area has been expanded by about four times from 1,500 to 2,400 square nautical miles of the South China Sea off the Sabah state to find the remaining victims.

A Brunei oil company of Brunei Shell Petroleum (BSP) and Chinese authorities also participated in the search. Brunei company focusing the search on its maritime baselines while Malaysian and Chinese authorities in the waters of Sabah. The MMEA deployed five vessels: KM Adil, KM Berani, KM Mabul, Kilat 40 and Kilat 23 – and two aircraft, a Canadair CL-415 plane and AW139 helicopter. The Royal Malaysian Navy (RMN) with four vessels: KD Ganas, KD Serang, CB 203 and CB 204, the Royal Malaysian Air Force (RMAF) with a C130 aircraft and the Marine Police has deployed four vessels, such as the PA 12, RH 29, RH 51 and PSC 1, and its Air Unit, two helicopters, the 9M-PHH and 9M-PHK. Until 30 January, the other victims still cannot be found as the search mission faces challenges due to rough sea condition and strong wind for the monsoon season, but the Malaysian authorities give assurance to Chinese counterpart that the issues were not the excuses and problem for them to stop their operations. The search also been expanded to neighbouring Sarawak with the search area has been widened from 3,000 to 3,900 square nautical miles.

On 1 February, a body of man was found by local authorities 500 metres in the waters south of Mamutik Island, but it was confirmed later that the body are not part of the boat mishap missing victims but a men who went missing while fishing with his friends off Dinawan Island. On 4 February, a body of woman was found by local fishermen some 13 nautical miles (around 20 kilometres) in their fishing net from the area where the catamaran boat capsized, which it was confirmed as part of the missing victims through DNA report on 6 February as the body have become decomposed.

The MMEA ended its search mission on 2 June, declaring that the five missing victims is forever missing.

== Investigation and probe ==
Following the incident, both of the surviving Filipino and Malaysian crewmen have been detained by the local police under Section 304A of the Malaysian Penal Law for causing death by negligence. A third person who is the owner of the boat company have been apprehended to facilitate investigation. All suspects remanded until 3 February, which then extended to 5 February. The boat registration status are also been investigated whether the boat is registered in Sabah or other place. According to Sabah State Tourism, Culture and Environment Assistant Minister, Pang Yuk Ming, normal catamarans registered outside Sabah could carry more than 30 passengers, but for Sabah the state government limits the number of passengers to no more than 12 passengers for tourism purposes. The minister also said the boat operator did not have permission from the authorities to use the jetty in Tanjung Aru from which they departed, adding the operator change the route due to the traffic conditions from the main jetty of Jesselton Point. The minister suspecting the crews may have wanted to avoid law regulations from tourism authorities such as the additional fees, checking of passenger capacity limit for a boat to depart and the use of safety equipment as the jetty they are using is a village jetty without any authorities located. In a statement, the minister said:

We will wait for the investigation to know whether there were elements of negligence. But the use of the jetty almost for sure (is) illegal. There are only three designated jetties for tourism use: the Jesselton pier and two others in Sutera Harbour resort and Shangri-la Tanjung Aru resort. Any other jetties are not meant for tourism use.

— Pang Yuk Ming, Sabah State Tourism, Culture and Environment Assistant Minister.

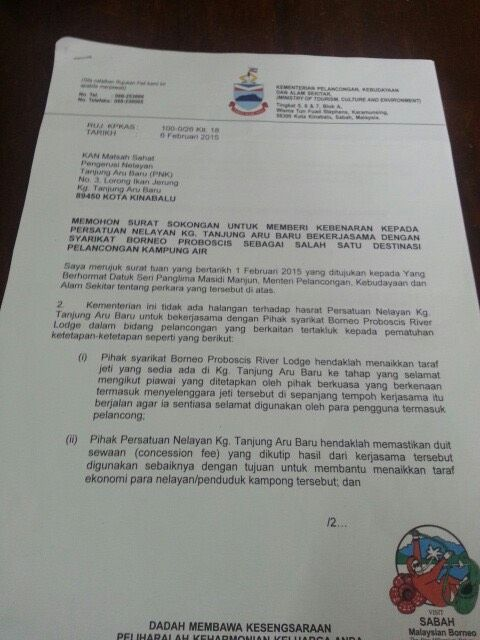
Letter presented by Tanjung Aru Baru village committee chief as evidence for permission granted by the state government to use the jetty.

However, this was denied by Tang Yeu, a tour boat operator who has using the jetty for years as he claim to have an approval letter from the Sabah state government to use such jetty. This was also supported by the Tanjung Aru Baru village committee chief leader, Matsah Sahat who expressed a similar view on the issue on which he photograph the approval letter given by the state government as evidence to local media. According to what has been stated on the letter, the villagers in Tanjung Aru had applied for permission to use the jetty from the Sabah State Tourism, Culture and Environment Ministry, with the support of the Agriculture and Food Industries Minister Yahya Hussin, who is also Deputy Chief Minister of Sabah. The letter was signed by the permanent secretary of the State Tourism, Culture and Environment Ministry, Ginun Yangus stating that the ministry had no objections to the villagers use and co-operation with the tour company under several conditions. The village community chief added the tour company pays RM1,000 a month to the committee for the use of the jetty, and employs some 15 locals to work as boatmen and security guards, as stipulated by the agreement. The tour boat operator also denied the claim by Sabah Tourism Assistant Minister that their crews wanted to avoid law and safety regulations as they always comply with the usage of safety vests. In a statement, he said:

It is not about saving money from paying fees. Our tourists like using this jetty, they get to go through the local village, and it is not congested like at Jesselton. The overloading of passengers also happened at Jesselton Pier, and I was vigilant about keeping safety standards, including using an engineering consultant to check on it. We have been trying to legalise this jetty as I had repeatedly submitted plans to the City Hall for approval. As far as we know, this jetty was built by the Fisheries Development Board of Malaysia (LKIM) for the local villagers to use. Part of it is legal, while the extension is not. The other jetty (used by the ill-fated boat) is a legal structure under City Hall but both are not sanctioned for tourists.

— Tang Yeu, local tour boat operator.

Due to the tragedy, the pier with benches and table from which the boat depart has been demolished by the Kota Kinabalu City Hall and all tourism activities in the jetty has been stopped immediately. The identity of the missing boat crew are found to be a vegetable seller who just joined the tour boat company about a month ago. Despite a warning to stop further activities, the business going as usual for the boat operators in Tanjung Aru according to the Sabah Tourism Assistant Minister. Due to this, he urged all involved parties to cease any tourism activities until an investigation is done being carried out. Adding that three-quarters of the land on the island of Mengalum belongs to private individuals while the rest is state land and we found that there are illegal structures erected there. The illegal structures will be demolished in a week and warning letters are being issued to the people involved. In a statement, the State Tourism Assistant Minister said:

For those claiming to have the proper documents and licenses to operate tours and chalets at the island, he advised them to re-check everything and be sure that they are operating legally. Please make sure all the requirements for your operations are met and if you are not sure, cease operations for the time being until everything is cleared. The authorities and our ministry will see if there is a need for a total overhaul of the tourism industry in the state.

One of the resort owner in the Mengalum Island clarified that the boat are not heading to his resort of Mengalum Tour Dive and Resort. According to him the island are divided into three ownerships, with state government owned 250-acre of land while a private company owned 500-acre of land as similarly been stated by the state tourism assistant minister earlier. The owner said he only develop the area on his land, adding that he saw there are some structures that do not belong to his resort built on the state government land thought he did not know whether the structures are illegal or not.

On 4 February, one of the boat skipper was sentenced to six months in prison, an accusation which the boat operator acknowledge and pleaded guilty while the boat owner was released on bail and will be on trial again in the next week since the owner does not know Malay language. All illegal structures in Mengalum Island also will be demolished as ordered by Sabah Deputy Chief Minister. On 6 February, following the resumnation of trial, the owner of the catamaran boat however pleads not guilty on charges dropped against him. The investigation was complete in 8 February with most of the surviving tourists has return to their home country while the remaining are still being treated in hospital. The probe previously found that weak law enforcements and laws that being broken as the main cause of the tragedy in addition to the boat being wrongly depart during rough sea conditions with the State Tourism Assistant Minister told that “the probe found almost all boat operators in the area did not have proper licences with the tragedy should serves as a reminder to everyone”.

=== Trial ===
13 March has been fixed for the re-mention of the case with the catamaran boat owner Leong Vin Jee received six charges. The trial case was transferred to Tourism Court where additional charges were imposed. Leong together with two other: Chung Ket Siew, the catamaran tour company owner and Sharezza Salian, one of the surviving boat skipper were slapped with various charges for negligence.

On 7 April, families of the tourists victims have engaged their lawyers to file petitions claiming for compensation from involved quarters, including the tour operator.

On 9 August, the proceedings found that the catamaran were in bad condition with the owner facing additional charges for negligence.

On 1 March 2019, the prosecution had proven its case beyond reasonable doubt against the three accused. Chung was found guilty of two charges, Leong guilty of six charges while Sharezza was found guilty of four charges. The duo were jailed for two years while Chung being placed on a two-year good behaviour bond with all three were also ordered to pay a cost of RM3,000.

== Effects on diplomatic relations ==
The incident put Malaysia in China spotlight again since the Malaysia Airlines Flight 370 and several other disasters that have taken many lives of Chinese tourists in Malaysia with Mainland Chinese media of China Daily, China Internet Information Center, Global Times, Xinhua News Agency and the Hong Kong-based South China Morning Post put a close watch to the tragedy with frequent news update. But despite all of the tragedies, the number of Chinese tourists to Malaysia are unaffected and keep increasing year by year with recent record put the number of Chinese tourists visiting Malaysia at 2.2 million, up from 1.2 million for a similar period in 2015.

== Reactions ==
=== State ===
- China – Foreign Affairs Ministry Spokesman Geng Shuang said the Chinese consulate in Kota Kinabalu has activated emergency response mechanisms. The China National Tourism Administration (CNTA) also activate a similar emergency response mechanism. Chinese Ambassador to Malaysia, Huang Huikang pledged the Malaysian side to spare no effort in searching with the Chinese Consulate-General in Kota Kinabalu has sent officials to Malaysia's search and rescue centre to co-ordinate with them following the order from General Secretary of the Chinese Communist Party Xi Jinping. The Chinese authorities hopes the Malaysian side will continue their search and rescue work and inform them for any recent updates. The ministry also said that “We deeply mourn for the victims and express condolences to the bereaved families”. While the Chinese ambassador to Malaysia asked the Sabah state government to ensure safety of tourists and explain to victims families what is being done to prevent similar incidents from recurring after visiting all the surviving victims at the Queen Elizabeth Hospital in Kota Kinabalu. China's Consul General in Sabah, Chen Peijie requested for a “justified solution including compensation” are given to all victims.
- Malaysia – Prime Minister Najib Razak called for a thorough investigation over the incident and called all parties to abide by rules and guidelines set by the Government to ensure their safety. He wrote on Facebook that “I take the Sabah boat capsize tragedy very seriously, and I want a thorough investigation to identify the cause of the incident. However, for now, complete focus must be given to the search and rescue of six other victims who are still missing”. Sabah State Chief Minister Musa Aman offered his deepest condolences to the families of the victims who perished in the incident and called for relevant authorities to enforce strict regulation. The Chief Minister added “My thoughts and prayers also go to those who are still missing”, and assured the Chinese ambassador to Malaysia that those responsible will be held accountable. While Sabah State Tourism, Culture and Environment Minister Masidi Manjun urging the public to calm and allow authorities to focus on the search and rescue efforts to find the remaining missing victims instead of finger-pointing and looking for a guilty party to place blame. Transport Minister Liow Tiong Lai said “the tragedy has revealed weaknesses in the enforcement of rules and regulations on tourist boat operations. We take this tragedy seriously, also because it tainted our public image at a time when we are promoting Sabah as a tourist destination. I have directed the Sabah Marine Department to aid in the investigations so that we can come up with pre-emptive measures to ensure this incident does not happen again with our ministry also would assist in the investigations”. Marine Department director, Baharin Abdul Hamid added that “passengers awareness also important to prevent such tragedy. Our department covering the administration in West Malaysia currently monitoring approximately 4,200 passenger boats licensed under our department to ensure that they adhered to all the safety regulations and standard operating procedures. We also compelled all passenger boats to operate and use jetties gazetted by the government. Passenger boat terminal and jetties in Sabah and Sarawak are under a different administrations of their own; with Sabah Ports and Harbours Department and Sarawak Rivers Board”. Sabah Progressive Party (SAPP) President Yong Teck Lee said the incident could have been avoided if Sabah has its own maritime academy to produce high skills boat operator. Citing on the recent tragedy that the boat operator is only a vegetable seller who had only just join the boat crew. The Democratic Action Party (DAP) of Sabah also urging the government and local authorities to set up independent advisory panel to investigate the incident while offering condolences to those who lost their lives in the tragedy. Kota Kinabalu Chinese Chamber of Commerce and Industry (KKCCCI) President, Michael Lui expressed his concern over the comment of Chinese Consul General of “a justified solution including compensation” for the victims and urge the state government to be responsible to assist all the tourists from China. In response to the statement, the State Tourism, Culture and Environment Minister told that the state government would study the international norms and practices with the company involved are the one who should be compensating the tragedy victims.

=== Criticism ===
The quick punishment to one of the surviving boat crews compared to the boat owner who managed to get bail has led to criticism by certain parties with the allegation of negligence to the authorities as well with an unverified report claiming that foreign Indonesian fishermen who save the victims. All the criticism and allegation however dismissed by the authorities with further explanation been given. The treatment to one of the local missing victim families has been questioned by Sabah Progressive Party (SAPP) President Yong Teck Lee as he saw the victim families have been staying for six days awaiting for news in the city without proper food and shelter and nobody came to assist them. The party president was appalled with the family current situation and feel that locals should have been given the same attention as the other victims who are mostly foreign tourists. The victim families was shortly brought to the state government attention following the complaint, with a minister said that "We was not aware of the situation and as now this matter has been brought to our attention, we will take over and make arrangements for them". Chinese authorities who taking care the surviving victims also been criticised for its discrimination towards local media while allowing their own country media to interview the victims. This was denied by the Chinese Consul General in Kota Kinabalu, explaining that the exclusive interview had to be done only by China Central Television (CCTV) to let the victims families in China to get the real coverage about their recent situation with other Chinese media are also not allowed to interview them.

== See also ==
- List of shipwrecks in 2017
