= Sarawak rabies outbreak =

Disease outbreak in Malaysia

- The arrival site of the virus in 2017.

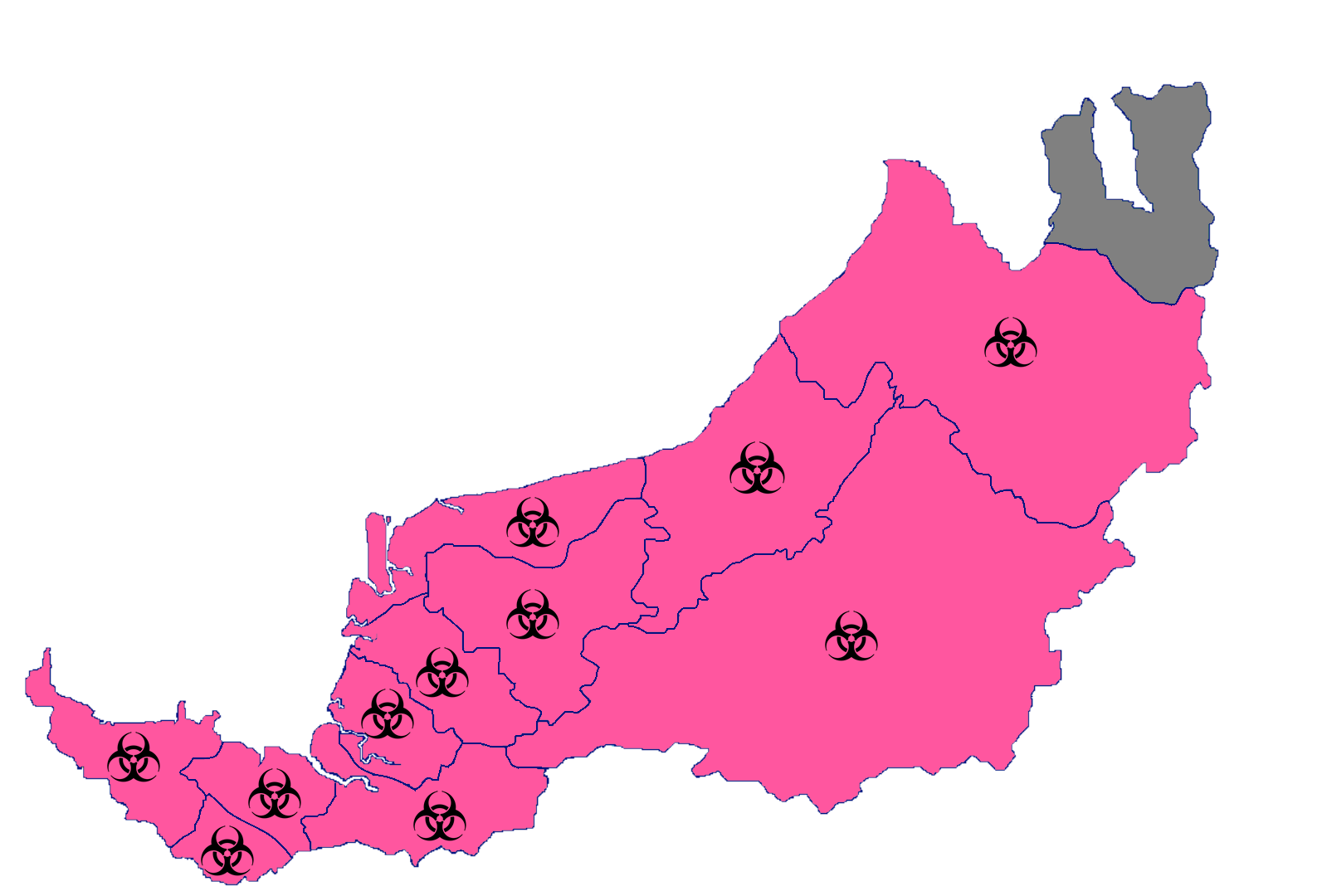
- Rabies affected divisions in Sarawak, 2018. Affected zone Free from infection zone
- Disease: Rabies
- First outbreak: West Kalimantan, Indonesia
- Index case: 1 July 2017
- Arrival date: July 2017
- Confirmed cases: 49
- Deaths: 44

The Sarawak rabies outbreak is an ongoing rabies outbreak in the state of Sarawak in Malaysia. Until 6 December 2022, 49 confirmed rabies cases and 44 deaths have been reported. (Note: Since the rabies outbreak was declared on 1 July 2017 in Sarawak, the number of cases has been 35 with 33 deaths. A further 14 cases with 11 deaths were reported from January until December 2022.)

== Background and spread of the disease ==
According to the findings of Malaysia's Health Ministry through the statement of the department minister S. Subramaniam in 2017, the origin source of rabies outbreak in Sarawak is suspected to have originated from neighbouring West Kalimantan in Indonesia with large rabies outbreak having occurred in the area. (Note: Since 2015, eight regencies in West Kalimantan, Indonesia have been affected by the virus with a total of 21 people have died. West Kalimantan Food, Husbandry and Animal Health Department Head Abdul Manaf said their region is battling to control a spike in rabies cases with reports in eight regencies increasing to 11 earlier in June 2017, prompting warnings to avoid dogs in the area. He pointed out three factors causing the immediate spread of the virus across West Kalimantan: 1. Dog mating season results in more opportunities for contracting and spreading the disease.; 2. Wild dogs move into townships and villages during the hot, dry season looking for food.; 3. Dog traders often are unaware of the health status of the animals.; To help the province in overcoming the spreading disease of rabies, the Indonesian central government has given their department additional funding of around Rp.700 million (US$52.556) which will be used to help train animal vaccine officers in the infected area while regional budgeting will support vaccines and other necessities.) The first casualties caused by the virus in Sarawak was reported on 4 July 2017 involving two children in Serian Division; a six-year-old girl and her four-year-old brother. This was followed by the death of a seven-year-old on 13 July, and a five-year-old four days later- both from Serian District.

In two years, the virus has taken the lives of 21 people; the 17th and 18th victims were a 26-year-old man from Batu Kawa and a 61-year-old woman from Pending who died on 31 May and 12 June in 2019. Another nine-year-old child victim was infected in August 2017 has been in the comatose state and treated at home. An 46-year-old man from Padawan who failed to inform the health authorities that he has been bitten by his puppy died on 7 August as the 19th victim while his eight-year-old daughter who was also bitten by the puppy are reported to be in good condition after the victim sent her earlier to a health clinic with her case was immediately referred to the Post Bite Clinic (PBC) at the Sarawak Hospital to receive the first dose of rabies vaccine.

On 2 November 2019, a five-year-old child from Kuching died while undergoing intensive care after being unwell since 13 October with sore throat symptom where he was confirmed positive for rabies through infection from his pet dogs that were allowed freely to play with stray dogs and not vaccinated against the virus while a girl, who has severe neurological complications caused by the virus has been on life support equipment for the past two years. Further fatalities were recorded in March 2020 involving a 5-year-old girl from Sibu town who was attacked and bitten by dogs on the face. Despite being treated and given the rabies vaccine, the girl died from rabies encephalitis on 25 March. On 20 May 2020, a 62-year-old man from within the same town of Sibu died after being bitten following a visit to relative's house.

On 8 September, another death was reported involving a 51-year-old man from Penrissen Road in Kuching who had been hospitalised since 26 August. On 20 October, a 42-year-old man died at the Sarawak Hospital was confirmed to be infected with the virus. On 22 October, a 34-year-old woman in Sibu died due to complications by the virus where she had early been bitten since the end of 2018 but did not seek treatment at any health facility. On 11 November, a 16-year-old girl died in the hospital of Kuching due to infection on her right leg which caused by a scratch from a virus infected dog. On 25 November, another victim which is a 58-year-old man died with symptoms of rabies and confirmed through diagnosis with a history being bitten two years before by a stray dog while hunting in the jungle and did not seek further treatment.

On 13 March 2021, another death was reported involving a 52-year-old man who had killed a dog. He didn't hand in the dog to the authority. The victim seek treatment on 31 January for chest pain, vomiting, shortness of breath and feeling numbness on the right hand before he died on 8 February. The diagnosis was confirmed by Universiti Malaysia Sarawak (UNIMAS) on 6 February. The second case involving a 54-year-old who had been bitten by his dog on 26 December 2020. His dog has been euthanised by authority on the same day. He sought medical care on 5 March for fever, nausea and loss of appetite where he subsequently died on 7 March. The diagnosis was confirmed by UNIMAS on 7 March.

On 5 May 2021, a 45-year-old female in Sungai Tepus of Selangau died following her deteriorating condition after being bitten by her pet dog despite getting her first anti-rabies vaccine dose early in April. On 11 May, another 45-year-old male in Stapang of Selangau became another victim where he later succumbed by the following day due to symptoms of fever, headache, sore throat, pain while drinking water and hydrophobia.

From January until 6 December 2022, a further total of 14 newer cases and 11 deaths have been reported.

== Areas affected ==
Since the first case was reported in Serian Division, further eight divisions including Betong, Kapit, Kuching, Miri, Samarahan, Sarikei, Sibu and Sri Aman have been declared as rabies infected areas. One of the main causes of the spread to other divisions is resulted from an irresponsible dog owner taking a dog out from a rabies-infected area without movement permit from the state veterinary authority as discovered in late 2018 with a case of man who brought his dog to Limbang Division from Kuching. From 1 July 2018 until 30 May 2019, the Sarawak government had declared 62 areas in 11 divisions as rabies infection areas with only Limbang Division free from the virus.

== Government and health authorities response ==
We are now going into another phase of the war against rabies. I have given instructions that all dogs throughout Sarawak within affected and non-affected areas be vaccinated. We have tried to contain the disease so far and the furthest area where we have a positive test is in Julau. We pray it stops there. That's why it is very critical that dogs throughout Sarawak be vaccinated.

— Sarawak Deputy Chief Minister Douglas Uggah Embas explaining to media on the situation of the outbreak in 2018 after more deaths were reported.

As a result of the first reported deaths in July 2017, the authorities began to declare a statewide rabies outbreak. In January 2019, the outbreak has been declared a Level 2 Disaster to enable all government agencies to pool resources in a concerted effort to mobilise and contain the spread of the disease with vaccination and removal of stray dogs and cats through phases starting from 1 March. With the ongoing outbreak, the federal government has contributed a total RM9.3 million for statewide anti-rabies operation in Sarawak including the dispatchment of various agencies both from state and the federal government including the State Disaster Management Committee (SDMC), armed forces, police, National Security Council, Civil Defence Force, Health Department and Department of Veterinary Services to jointly stop the spread of the virus. As stated by Malaysia's Deputy Health Minister Lee Boon Chye in 2019, the country Health Ministry will consider proposals from universities or the industrial sector to conduct medical science research on the treatment of rabies. On 4 July, Sarawak Research and Development Council (SRDC) entered into an agreement with Universiti Malaysia Sarawak (UNIMAS) to conduct research on quick diagnosis of rabies in the state.

Local residence in the involved areas were urged to give out their full co-operation to eliminate the outbreak since there have been reports in the early phase that it is not well received by animal lovers and groups representing animal rights. The government then increased more awareness programmes, mass vaccination for pets and opening of animal bite clinics for people to seek medical attention and to be vaccinated for suspected of the virus infection after being bitten by animals. A total of 120,353 dogs from an estimate of 210,000 dogs have been vaccinated throughout the outbreak. With the growing awareness, the fourth phase operations for "targeted removal" carried out in Lundu, Bau, Padawan, Samarahan, Kuching, Serian and Simunjan went smoothly without interruption with a total of 6,725 stray dogs and 61 cats have been removed. The number of vaccination increases to over 150,000 in October 2019 through free anti-rabies vaccination provided by the government.

The government also began to maintaining an immune belt along the Sarawak-West Kalimantan border where the rabies is believed to have spread from. A total ban on the movement of dogs both in and out of Sarawak along its border with Kalimantan was imposed on 23 August 2019 to curb the spread of the virus with Sarawak Deputy Chief Minister Douglas Uggah Embas expressed his disappointment to certain people who had been bitten by their pet dogs and cats but did not seek immediate medical treatment despite the many publicity campaigns, talks and statements with radio announcements and reminders have been delivered by the government. Nevertheless, the Sarawak Health Department with the co-operation of the Veterinary Services Department and the local councils are working together to mitigate new occurrences with the State Disaster Management Committee (SDMC) also has given the assurance that the outbreak in Sarawak is contained.

Neighbouring Sabah have been on alert on the quick spread of the virus and began to maintaining a tight check on the movement of animals since the outbreak in Sarawak. The United States Embassy in Malaysia and the Centers for Disease Control and Prevention (CDC) have raised a notice and Level 2 Alert on the outbreak in 2017. The government of Sarawak also collaborates with authorities in neighbouring Sabah, Brunei and Indonesia to contain the spread of the virus through information exchange and border control along with mass vaccination and targeted removal programmes to ensure the migration of animals is under control with the government promise it will continue to conduct annual dogs vaccination programmes and controlling dogs movement between Sarawak divisions until the state is declared rabies free.

In October 2021, the Sarawak government has approved a total of RM7.07 million budget as part of its action plan for rabies control and complete eradication with the aim to end further human infection cases by 2022 and infection among the dogs by 2025.

== See also ==
- Prevalence of rabies
