= Trial of Sam Ke Ting =

2017 traffic accident in Malaysia

- Date: 18 February 2017
- Time: 03:20 MYT (21:20 UTC)
- Location: Johor Bahru Inner Ring Road, Johor Bahru, Johor, Malaysia; 1.4652°N 103.7478°E
- Also known as: Basikal lajak case; Public Prosecutor v. Sam Ke Ting
- Deaths: 8
- Injuries: 2 serious, 6 light injuries
- Suspects: 1 (Sam Ke Ting)
- Charges: Causing death by reckless and dangerous driving
- Sentence: 6 year imprisonment and RM6000 fine (2022; overturned); Acquitted (2023)

The modified bicycle (Malay: Basikal Lajak) case is a traffic accident that took place on 18 February 2017 in Johor Bahru, Malaysia. Sam Ke Ting (Chinese: 沈可婷; pinyin: Shěn KěTíng), a 22-year-old salesgirl, ploughed into a group of teenagers on modified bicycles, resulting in the death of eight teenagers and injuries to another eight. Sam was charged with recklessly and dangerous driving causing death.

The accident quickly gained widespread public attention in the country about the issue of modified bicycles on the road. There were also extensive public debates if the parents of the teenage victims should be held responsible for their lack of supervision. The case also resulted in a blanket ban on all powered micro-mobility devices in 2022.

Sam was found guilty of her charges by the Johor Bahru High Court on 13 April 2022 and was served a six years jail sentence and an MYR6000 fine. However, she was acquitted by the Court of Appeal (COA) on 11 April 2023.

== History ==
=== Background ===
The modified bicycles (Malay: Basikal Lajak) refers to fixed-gear bicycles that had been heavily modified with shorter handlebar and stem than ordinary bicycles. The wheels are also replaced with plastic sports wheels which allow the bicycle to be ridden at a higher speed than usual. This kind of modified bicycle is popular among teenagers and children in Malaysia and can be easily obtained from online shopping platforms or modified in local bicycle shops. They would race their bicycles downhill in groups along public roads and highways usually at midnight when there is little traffic. Upon reaching high speeds, the riders usually switch into the "Superman position" or the planking posture where they lie down with their abdomen on the saddle and legs extended backwards.

While most attribute the issue of illegal street racing using modified bicycles to the lack of supervision from parents, some argue that this is the result of urban development encroaching on the recreational space of teenagers and children.

=== Accident ===
On 18 February 2017 at 3:20 a.m., Sam Ke Ting (aged 22 at the time) was driving along the Inner Ring Road in Johor Bahru when she ran over a group of teenagers riding modified bicycles, causing eight deaths. The area was said to have low visibility and dim street lighting. The dead victims were Mohamad Azrie Danish Zulkefli, Muhamad Shahrul Izzwan Azzuraimie, Muhammad Harith Iskandar Abdullah and Muhammad Shahrul Nizam Marudin, all aged 14; Muhammad Firdauz Danish Mohd Azhar, Mohamad Azhar Amir and Haizad Kasrin, all aged 16; and Fauzan Halmijan, 13, who is the youngest victim to die.

== Trial ==
Sam was charged with one count of reckless or dangerous driving resulting in death on 28 March 2018 in the Johor Bahru Magistrate Court where the court freed her on 28 October 2019 without calling her to enter defence. The prosecution managed to appeal against the Magistrate court's court judgement in the Johor Bahru High Court and Sam was asked to enter her defence in February 2021 in the Magistrate court where she pleaded not guilty to the charges. After going to trial, the same Magistrate court again acquitted Sam in October 2021 as Judge Siti Hajar Ali deemed it unsafe to convict Sam due to prosecution's failure to prove its case beyond reasonable doubt. The court also determined that Sam was not driving under the influence of alcohol, was alert at the wheel, and possibly under the speed limit at the time of the crash.

The prosecution appealed a second time to the Johor Bahru High Court which allowed the appeal and convicted Sam of reckless driving on 13 April 2022, sentencing her to six years in jail and a RM6000 fine. The High Court also rejected a request for stay of execution pending appeal to higher court and ordered Sam to serve her jail sentence immediately. The High Court claimed that Sam failed to convince the Judge that she was not driving dangerously and that not knowing about the modified bicycle activity do not amount to the justification to drive dangerously. In response to Sam's claim that the road have poor lighting conditions, the court ruled that she should've driven more carefully under said condition.

After serving her jail sentence for five days, Sam finally obtained a stay of execution from the Court of Appeal on 18 April 2022. Upon leaving prison, Sam through her lawyer urged the public to avoid blaming the judiciary, as criticizing a court's ruling in Malaysia can amount to contempt of court.

On 11 April 2023, the Court of Appeal (COA) reached a unanimous decision in a three-member panel led by COA Judge Datuk Hadhariah Syed Ismail to overturn High Court's ruling and set aside Sam's conviction. The Court ruled that the charge brought upon Sam was defective and illegal as Sam was charged with "Causing death by reckless and dangerous driving" while Section 41(1) of the Road Transport Act 1987 states that reckless driving and dangerous driving are two separate violations. Since Sam was effectively charged with two separate offenses under one charge, it violates Section 163 of the Criminal Procedure Code (CPC) which states that there should be separate charges for distinct offences.

In this case, the charge is not correct. The conviction (based on a defective charge) is also incorrect. So both (are) not according to the law. (It) is the appellant's right, under the law, to claim the charge must be correct, that the conviction must be correct. On this ground alone, the appellant's appeal is allowed. The High Court decision dated April 13, 2022 on the conviction and sentence is set aside. The appellant is acquitted and released. You are now a free person.

— COA judge Datuk Hadhariah Syed Ismail,

The Judge also cited the Magistrate court's judgement, that "the only way to avoid the accident was if the car flew over the cyclists" as a finding of fact that there was no possible way for Sam to avoid the group of "30 to 40 bicycles". Since the trial started in the magistrate court, the prosecution had exhausted the avenues for appeal and the ruling by the Court of Appeal is final.

After her acquittal, Sam held a brief press conference with her lawyer before leaving the court complex. Sam read out the names of the deceased victims and apologize to their families, saying that she sympathizes with their suffering and that the tragedy was not intentional.

== Reactions ==
=== Legal community ===
The prosecution's success in convicting Sam in the Johor Bahru High Court was mainly attributed to her giving new, non-cross-examined details to the court, otherwise known as the afterthought defence, in an unsworn statement. This might have hurt her credibility in the eyes of the judge. According to the law, the accused have the right to give an unsworn statement from the dock which cannot be the subject of cross-examination, but the statement will not carry the same evidential weight as the evidence given under oath. It is up to the court's discretion to decide the weight an unsworn deserves or not at all, after taking the whole evidence into consideration.

=== Civil society ===
The ruling by the Johor Bahru High Court to overturn the Magistrate Court's acquittal was faced with public backlash, with two online petitions on Change.org seeking 'justice' for Sam amassing 950,000 signatures collectively in 24 hours. One of the petitions cited the magistrate 2019 judgement that “Sam was not under the influence of alcohol, was not using her phone and had her seatbelt on while driving, proving that she was driving responsibly and carefully, but it was a dark, hilly and winding road where the driver could not foresee that there would be a bicycle gang on the road at 3am in the morning.”

In general, the Chinese community mainly attribute the tragedy to the lack of behavioural education, flawed road designs and the lax enforcement towards modified bicycle by the authority, with most discussion focusing on the topic of parental responsibilities. The Malay community on the other hand zooms in on the social problems faced by teenagers, and believe that the case had created racial tension in society while agreeing that the authority should better enforce modified bicycles and educate teenagers against such activities.
