= Income Tax Act 1967 =

Law in Malaysia

Parliament of Malaysia
- Long title: An Act for the imposition of income tax.
- Citation: Act 53
- Territorial extent: Throughout Malaysia
- Passed by: Dewan Rakyat
- Passed: 24 August 1967
- Enacted: 1967 (Act No. 47 of 1967); Revised: 1971 (Act 53 w.e.f. 21 October 1971)
- Enacted by: Dewan Negara
- Effective: 28 September 1967

Legislative history

First chamber: Dewan Rakyat
- Bill title: Income Tax Bill 1967
- Introduced by: Tan Siew Sin, Minister of Finance
- First reading: 21 August 1967
- Second reading: 24 August 1967
- Third reading: 24 August 1967

Second chamber: Dewan Negara
- Bill title: Income Tax Bill 1967
- Member(s) in charge: Ng Kam Poh, Assistant Minister of Finance
- First reading: 28 August 1967
- Second reading: 29 August 1967
- Third reading: 29 August 1967

Amended by
- Income Tax (Amendment) Act 1967 [Act 77/1967] Income Tax (Transitional Provisions) Order 1968 [P.U. 144/1968] Income Tax (Amendment) Act 1969 [Act A13] Resolution under s. 127(2) [P.U. (B) 146/1969] Income Tax (Amendment to Schedule 6) Order 1969 [P.U. (A) 510/1969] Emergency (Essential Powers) Ordinance No. 38, 1970 [P.U. (A) 256/1970] Income Tax (Amendment) Act 1971 [Act A32] Income Tax (Amendment) (No.2) Act 1971 [Act A60] Income Tax (Amendment) Act 1972 [Act A98] Income Tax (Amendment) (No.2) Act 1972 [Act A108] Income Tax (Amendment) Act 1973 [Act A158] Amendment to Part II of Schedule 6 [P.U. (A) 266/1974] Amendment to Part II of Schedule 6 [P.U. (A) 267/1974] Amendment to Part II of Schedule 6 [P.U. (A) 328/1974] Income Tax (Amendment) Act 1974 [Act A225] Income Tax (Amendment) (No. 2) Act 1974 [Act A226] Income Tax (Amendment) (No.3) Act 1974 [Act A227] Income Tax (Amendment) Act 1975 [Act A273] Malaysian Currency (Ringgit) Act 1975 [Act 160] Income Tax (Amendment) Act 1976 [Act A344] Amendment to Part I of Schedule 6 [P.U. (B) 50/1976] Amendment to Part II of Schedule 6 [P.U. (B) 303/1976] Amendment to Part II of Schedule 6 [P.U. (B) 186/1977] Amendment to Part II of Schedule 6 [P.U. (B) 187/1977] Amendment to Part II of Schedule 6 [P.U. (B) 363/1977] Amendment to Part II of Schedule 6 [P.U. (B) 364/1977] Amendment to Part II of Schedule 6 [P.U. (B) 365/1977] Income Tax (Amendment) Act 1977 [Act A380] Income Tax (Amendment) Act 1978 [Act A429] Subordinate Courts Amendment Act 1978 [Act A434] Income Tax (Amendment) Act 1979 [Act A451] Amendment to Part I of Schedule 6 [P.U. (B) 421/1979] Amendment to Part II of Schedule 6 [P.U. (B) 422/1979] Amendment to Part II of Schedule 6 [P.U. (B) 423/1979] Income Tax (Amendment) Act 1980 [Act A471] Finance Act 1981 [Act 241] Revision of Laws (Income Tax Act 1967) Order 1981 [P.U. (A) 161/1981] Finance Act 1982 [Act 264] Finance (No. 2) Act 1982 [Act 274] Finance Act 1983 [Act 293] Finance Act 1984 [Act 309] Finance Act 1985 [Act 315] Finance (No. 2) Act 1985 [Act 323] Income Tax (Amendment) Act 1986 [Act A643] Finance Act 1986 [Act 328] Finance Act 1987 [Act 337] Finance Act 1988 [Act 364] Income Tax (Transitional Provisions) Order 1989 [P.U. (A) 212/1989] Finance Act 1990 [Act 420] Income Tax (Transitional Provisions) Order 1990 [P.U. (A) 266/1990] Finance (No.2) Act 1990 [Act 421] Income Tax (Amendment) Act 1990 [Act A774] Finance Act 1991 [Act 451] Revision of Laws (Rectification) Order 1991 [P.U.(A) 406/1991] Finance Act 1992 [Act 476] Finance Act 1993 [Act 497] Finance Act 1994 [Act 513] Finance Act 1995 [Act 531] Finance Act 1996 [Act 544] Income Tax (Amendment) Act 1996 [Act A955] Finance Act 1997 [Act 557] Income Tax (Amendment) Act 1997 [Act A998] Finance Act 1998 [Act 578] Tax Laws (Amendment) Act 1998 [Act A1028] Finance (No. 2) Act 1998 [Act 591] Income Tax (Amendment) Act 1999 [Act A1055] Income Tax (Amendment) (No. 2) Act 1999 [Act A1069] Finance Act 2000 [Act 600] Income Tax (Amendment) Act 2000 [Act A1093] Finance (No. 2) Act 2000 [Act 608] Finance Act 2002 [Act 619] Income Tax (Amendment) Act 2002 [Act A1151] Revision of Laws (Rectification of Income Tax Act 1967) Order 2002 [P.U. (A) 338/2002] Finance (No. 2) Act 2002 [Act 624] Finance Act 2003 [Act 631] Finance Act 2004 [Act 639] Finance Act 2005 [Act 644]

Related legislation
- Income Tax Ordinance 1956 of Sabah [29 of 1956] Inland Revenue Ordinance 1960 of Sarawak [13 of 1960] Income Tax Ordinance 1947 [M.U. 48 of 1947] Housing Trust Ordinance 1950 [F.M. 62 of 1950] Petaling Jaya Ordinance 1954 [F.M. 36 of 1954] Land Development Ordinance 1956 [F.M. 20 of 1956] Central Bank of Malaysia Ordinance 1958 [F.M. 61 of 1958] Racing (Totalizator Board) Act 1961 [F.M. 10 of 1961] Sarawak Electricity Supply Corporation 1962 [F.M. 25 of 1962]

Keywords
- Income tax
- Status: In force

The Income Tax Act 1967 (Malay: Akta Cukai Pendapatan 1967), is a Malaysian law establishing the imposition of income tax.

== Structure ==
The Income Tax Act 1967, in its current form (1 January 2006), consists of 10 Parts containing 156 sections and 9 schedules (including 77 amendments).

- Part I: Preliminary
- Part II: Imposition and General Characteristics of the Tax
- Part III: Ascertainment of Chargeable Income
  - Chapter 1: Preliminary
  - Chapter 2: Basis years and basis periods
  - Chapter 3: Gross income
  - Chapter 4: Adjusted income and adjusted loss
  - Chapter 5: Statutory income
  - Chapter 6: Aggregate income and total income
  - Chapter 7: Chargeable income
  - Chapter 8: Special cases
- Part IV: Persons Chargeable
- Part V: Returns
- Part VI: Assessments and Appeals
  - Chapter 1: Assessments
  - Chapter 2: Appeals
- Part VII: Collection and Recovery of Tax
- Part VIIA: Fund for Tax Refund
- Part VIII: Offences and Penalties
- Part IX: Exemptions, Remission and Other Relief
- Part IXA: Special Incentive Relief
- Part X: Supplemental
  - Chapter 1: Administration
  - Chapter 2: Controlled companies and powers to protect the revenue in case of certain transactions
  - Chapter 3: Miscellaneous
- Schedules
