= Queen Elizabeth Hospital, Kota Kinabalu =

Queen Elizabeth Hospital
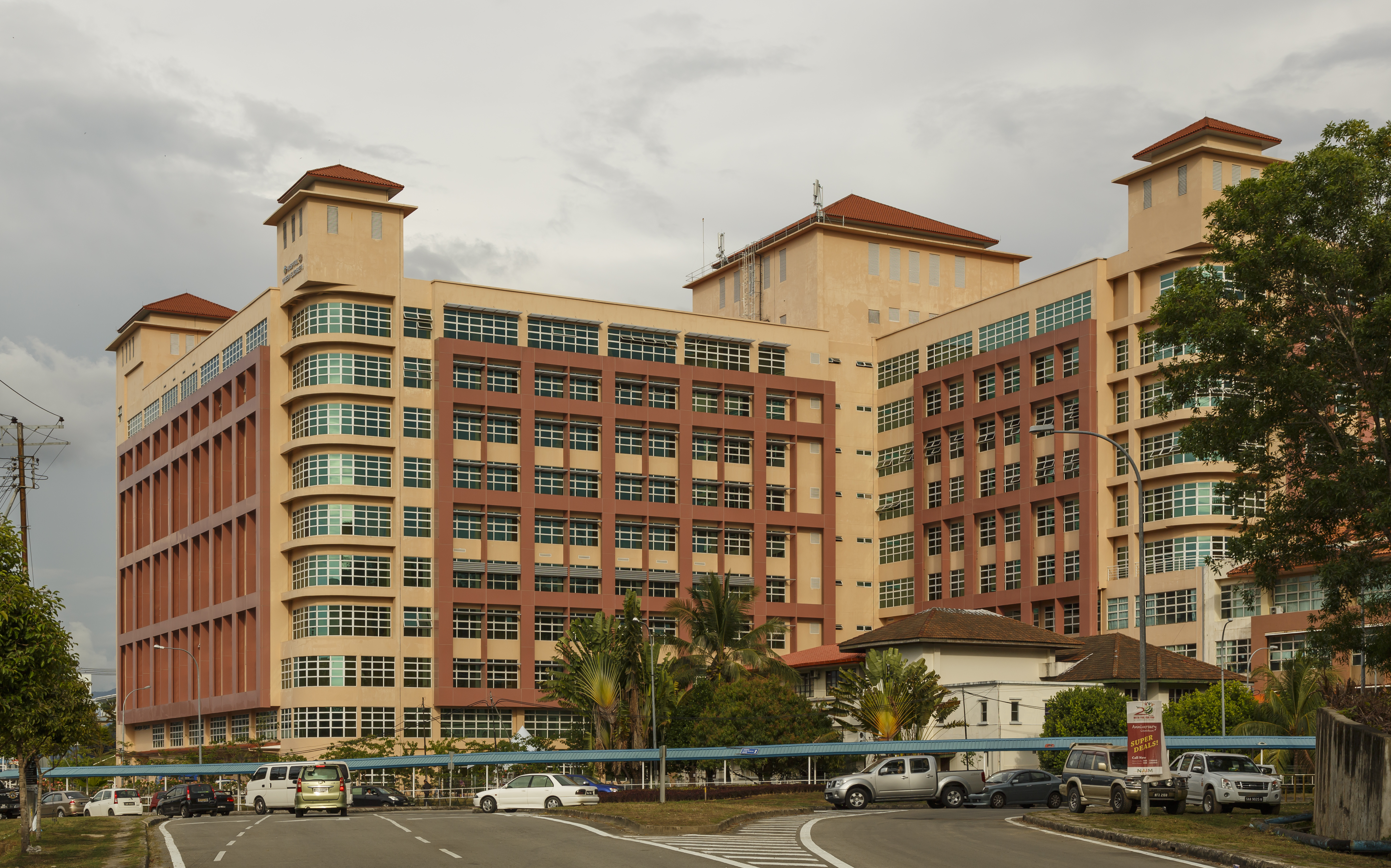
- QEH 1 building

Geography
- Location: Kepayan Ridge (QEH 1) and Damai (QEH 2), Kota Kinabalu, Sabah, Malaysia
- Coordinates: 5°57′24″N 116°4′24″E (QEH 1); 5°58′0″N 116°5′37″E (QEH 2)

Organisation
- Care system: Government hospital
- Type: District General

Services
- Emergency department: Yes
- Beds: 779 (QEH 1); 400 (QEH 2)

History
- Founded: 1981 (QEH 1); 2009 (QEH 2)

Links
- Website: jknsabah.moh.gov.my/hqe1/ (QEH 1) jknsabah.moh.gov.my/hqe2/ (QEH 2)
- Lists: Hospitals in Malaysia

The Queen Elizabeth Hospital (Malay: Hospital Queen Elizabeth) in Kota Kinabalu, Sabah is the main public hospital for the city and the whole Sabah. It is named after Queen Elizabeth II.

== History ==
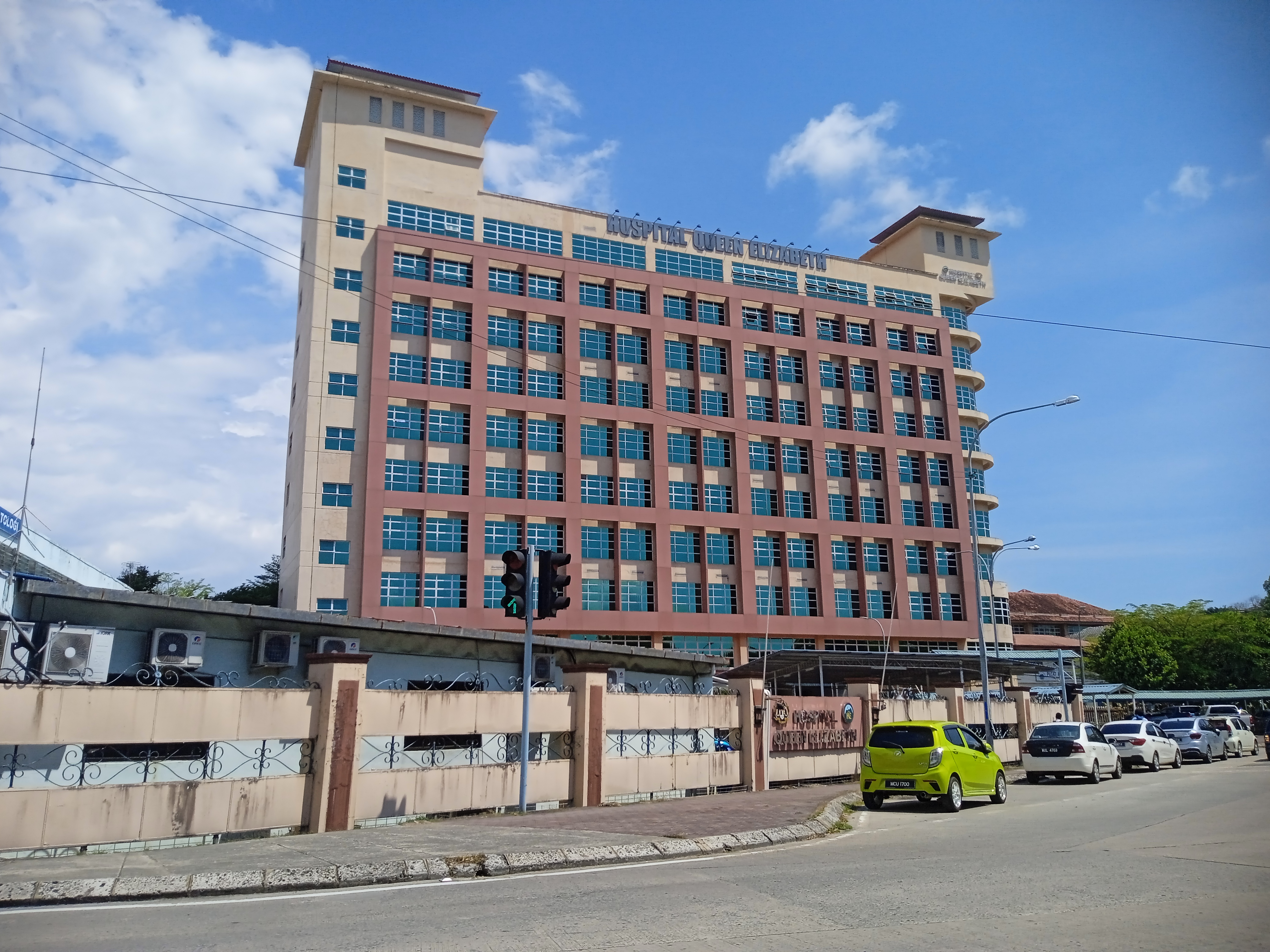
Facade of Queen Elizabeth Hospital from Jalan Penampang, part of Malaysia Federal Route 501 in Kota Kinabalu, Sabah

The first hospital building was built in 1957 (firstly in the Karamunsing neighbourhood of the city) along the Old Tuaran Road, known as Jalan Tuaran Lama (next to the former site premises of the Radio Televisyen Malaysia branch headquarters building, which has since been demolished and vacated since 2011 for future developments, in which that area was also known to be the current sites for the upcoming Radio Sabah broadcasting museum as well as the newly completed permanent branch office building premises of the Jabatan Audit Negara, the hospital only moved to its permanent existing site in Kepayan Ridge sixteen years later in 1973, ten years after the formation of Malaysia), then followed by a second building in 1981, This reinforced concrete tower was found to be using unwashed sea sand as part of the concrete mix, which caused its structure to fail which leads into its demolition in 2009. The hospital was visited by the Queen in 1971 and currently it is being replaced with a new one the same year, in which it is still in use until the present era.

Prior to the demolishment of existing first building in 2009, the federal government purchased the former building premises of the Sabah Medical Centre (SMC) private hospital located in the Damai neighbourhood (now known as the KPJ Sabah Specialist Hospital, in which they have a permanent building just across the street nearby to the current QEH 2 premises since 2014), whereby it was renovated and being renamed as Queen Elizabeth Hospital II. The second building has since been maintained. Although the service for normal patients has been returned to the new first building located at the existing main hospital building premises in Kepayan Ridge, the second building that was located in Damai is mainly used now as a heart centre or a specialist hospital for cardiothoracic health-related services (but other health services are also provided in the second building).

== See also ==
- List of hospitals in Malaysia
