= Dinawan Island =

Island in Malaysia

- Interactive map of Dinawan Island

Geography
- Coordinates: 5°50′46.6″N 115°59′26.1″E
- Highest elevation: 73 m (240 ft)

Administration
- Malaysia
- State: Sabah
- Division: West Coast
- District: Papar

Dinawan Island (Malay: Pulau Dinawan) is a Malaysian island located in the West Coast on the state of Sabah. It is located about 3.5 kilometres from the township of Kinarut near the mouth of the Kinarut River. The island is 73 m high and surrounded by reefs and sandbanks. The private owner operates a tourist resort on the island.

== See also ==
- List of islands of Malaysia
