= Mengalum Island =

Island of Sabah, Malaysia

Native name: Pulau Mengalum/Mangalum
- Interactive map of Mengalum Island

Geography
- Coordinates: 6°11′59″N 115°35′47″E
- Archipelago: Borneo (Greater Sunda Islands)
- Adjacent to: South China Sea

Administration
- Malaysia
- State: Sabah
- Division: West Coast
- District: Kota Kinabalu

Mengalum Island (Malay: Pulau Mengalum; Kadazan Dusun: Mangalum; West Coast Bajau: Mangalum) is an island located in the West Coast Division of Kota Kinabalu District, Sabah in the South China Sea in Malaysia. The island is 4.2 square kilometres (1.6 sq mi) in size and lies offshore 56 kilometres (35 mi) northwest of Sabah's capital city of Kota Kinabalu. In the past, crude oil was discovered in the waters of the island by the British in the 1900s, before the island became one of the Empire of Japan's reprisal points during the Second World War in the hunt for Jesselton revolt members. Under Sabah and Malaysian administration, it was used as a quarantine facility for imported livestock up until 1997. In the present time, various conservation efforts are initiated on the island through the joint efforts between the local department and foreign entities. The island also became one of the diving spots in Sabah.

== History ==
The island, like most territories on the coast of northern Borneo, was once under the thalassocracy of the Sultanate of Brunei.

=== British acquisition ===
In 1854, Captain Edward Belcher of HMS Saracen mentioned in its logs an anchor lying on the island of Mengalum. Several further surveys on the north western coast of Borneo was made by the British in 1858, one of which by HMS Fury. In 1877, the area from the Sulaman River on the west coast to the Paitan River on the east coast together with any islands within three marine leagues (equivalent to three nautical miles) of the coast of North Borneo was ceded by Sultan Abdul Momin of Brunei to Gustavus Baron de Overbeck and Alfred Dent of the North Borneo Chartered Company (NBCC). Through the agreement text based on the CO 874/54 cession deeds by the Sultanate of Brunei written in Jawi script, it explicitly remained "under the sovereignty of the Sultanate and of him who possesses it" with the island is located far from the three nautical miles. The agreement text, however, does not mention who the owner was in 1898, with the island administered under the NBCC of North Borneo, which is then passed down to Sabah and subsequently under Malaysian sovereignty, with the modern state of Brunei not including the island in its present maritime claims.

During the Japanese occupation, Mengalum Island became one of the points where many island natives were massacred by Japanese occupying forces as reprisals for the attacks in the Jesselton revolt, in which entire communities on the home islands of those who participated in the uprising were decimated. Panglima Ali, one of the uprising leaders, once settled on Mengalum Island off the coast of Jesselton (present-day Kota Kinabalu).

=== 2017 Chinese tourist boat mishap ===
The island is among popular destination for Chinese tourists to Sabah. On 28 January 2017, four Chinese nationals died while 22 others rescued after their boat sunk in the sea while on their way to visiting the island. In a trial, three people were charged with negligence for failing to ensure the tourist's safety, and two, consisting of the tour operator and boat skipper, were sent to prison to serve a two-year sentence.

== Geography ==
The island is surrounded by a coral chain, broken only at the southeast portion where vessels may enter and anchor at the shore. During the visit by British vessels in the 1800s, there were many freshwater ponds around the island located close to the beach with vegetation covering the waters. Firewood was also abundant with variant species. In 1928, large areas of the island are covered with forest area.

=== Climate ===
It features a tropical climate with high temperatures and humidity throughout the year. Average daily temperatures generally range from 20 °C (68 °F) to 30 °C (86 °F). Rainfall is high, with an average of 2,700 millimetres (110 inches) annually. The prevalent wind direction on the island is mostly from the west area, while winds from the east or southeast are only prevalent from the months of December to January.

=== Conservation sites ===
The Mengalum coral reef cluster is a traditional fishing area for the local islanders community, which is rich in marine resources. (Note: The island fishing zones and its coral reef cluster were threatened by the invasion of foreign fishing boats from neighbouring countries of the Philippines and Vietnam, either complicit with local fishermen or illegal, and the use of blast fishing, which subsequently caused the frequent dispatchment of the Malaysian Maritime Enforcement Agency (MMEA) for daily monitoring of the illegal activities, arresting of the culprits, and confiscation of their equipment.) A total of 28 genera reef species has been identified between 1979 until 1994 with 64 belong to the hard coral species. The island also became the habitat for various bird and insect species. Through a survey between 1928 and 2007, the island has lost a number of its butterfly species due to deforestation. Since 2021, various conservation efforts are initiated through the joint efforts between the Sabah Wildlife Department and the Taiwanese Sinyi Group for the nature conservation and restoration efforts of the island's coral reefs, turtles, and other species. The waters around the island also reported the frequent sightings of dugongs.

=== Mengalum Anchor ===
An old anchor named the Mengalum Anchor (Malay: Jangkar Mengalum) is located within the island. It is a naval anchor estimated to have been built around 1819 and 1845, weighing approximately 2,000 kilograms (4,400 lb), measuring 313.06 centimetres (10.271 ft) long from the tip to the eye of the anchor and 228.6 centimetres (7.50 ft) from the right hook to the left hook. This anchor became the point of interest among historians since when and how it came to be on the island is still questionable. Through the earliest recorded by Captain Edward Belcher in HMS Saracen's log in 1854, the iron anchor is believed to be a Richard Pering improved anchor or Admiralty (British) anchor. It is revered by both local residents of nearby islands and passing fishermen. Therefore, it is unusual to see offerings such as rice, tobacco, eggs, and other food items being placed within the anchor.

== Economy ==
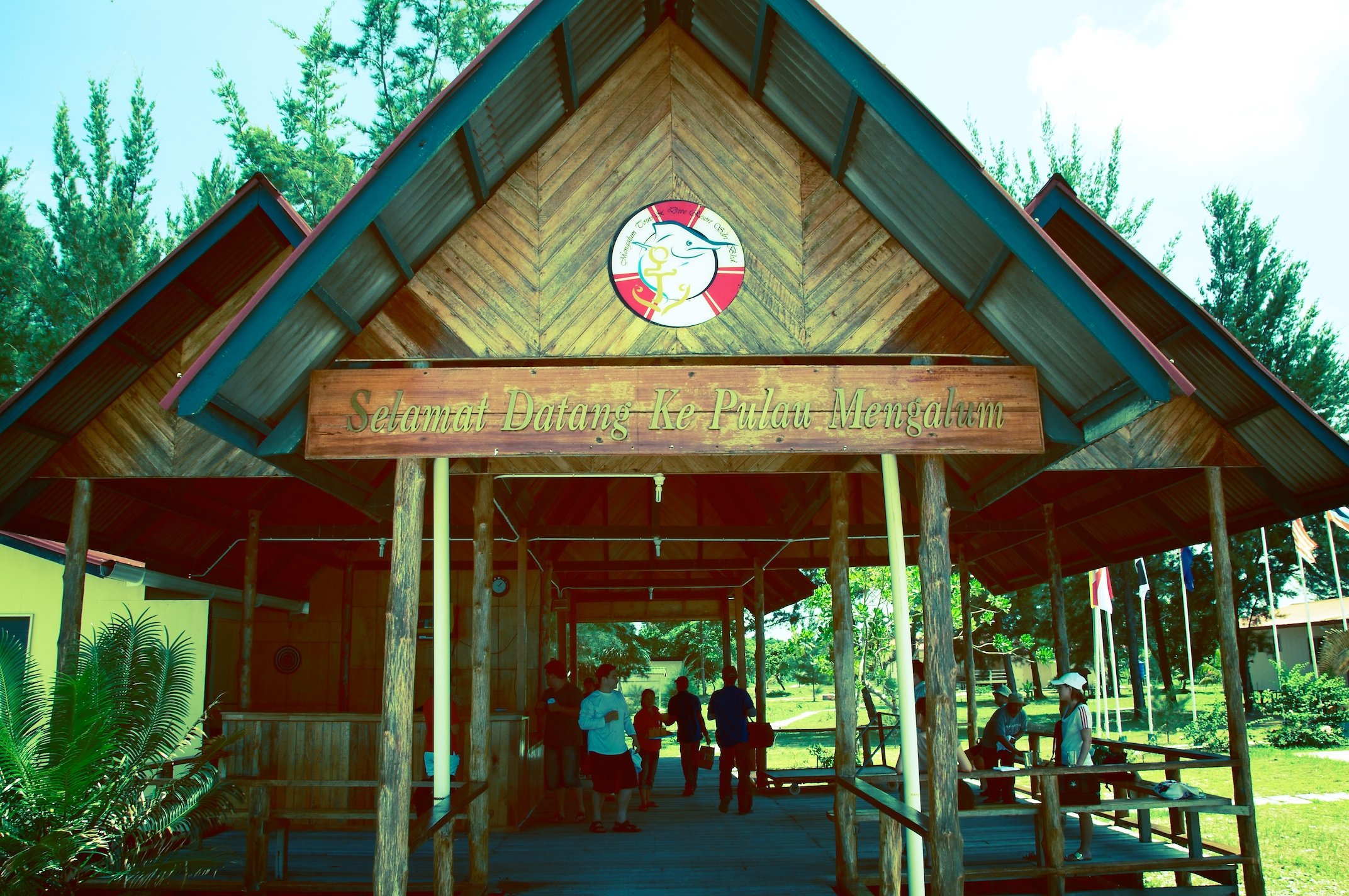
A tourist reception on the island, pictured in 2009

During the administration of British North Borneo, crude oil was discovered by the British within the waters of the island in the 1900s. There was also an exploration well drilled in 1959 to a depth of 2,126.59 metres (6,977.0 ft; 1.32140 mi) on the island by the Shell Company of North Borneo, a subsidiary of the Royal Dutch Shell, but since no oil accumulations were found the well was abandoned in July as a dry hole. Under the administration of Sabah and Malaysian authorities, the island became a tourist spot with the construction of a resort. A small number of Suluk fishermen inhabited the island until the 1960s. It was also used in the past as a quarantine depot by the local agricultural department for the entry and exit of both livestock and animals until 1997.

In 2021, Taiwanese real estate company Sinyi Realty Co. Ltd. made an investment on the island for the establishment of an eco-tourism resort. The company developed it as a zero-carbon island off the coast of Borneo, from the foundational surveys of the island and its habitat geology, water resources, and tree species, with the company working on its development and restoration approaches. Since the island previously lacked proper management, with frequent forest fires and blast fishing that damaged the coral reefs around, the development also was intended to provide employment opportunities among the locals for them to cease the former activities that damaged the island.

== Transportation ==
The island can be reached by boat from the city of Kota Kinabalu which takes around 1 hour or 1 hour 30 minutes. The operation of small water vessels within the island waters is subject to regulation under the State Ports and Harbours Enactment 2002.

== See also ==
- List of islands of Malaysia
