= 2023 in Malaysia =

- Decades: 2000s; 2010s; 2020s
- See also: Other events of 2023; History of Malaysia • Timeline • Years

2023 in Malaysia is 66th anniversary of Malaysia's independence and 60th anniversary of its formation of Malaysia.

== Federal level ==
- Yang di-Pertuan Agong: Al-Sultan Abdullah Ri'ayatuddin Al-Mustafa Billah Shah of Pahang
- Raja Permaisuri Agong: Tunku Azizah Aminah Maimunah Iskandariah of Pahang
- Deputy Yang di-Pertuan Agong: Sultan Nazrin Muizzuddin Shah of Perak
- Prime Minister: Anwar Ibrahim
- Deputy Prime Ministers: Ahmad Zahid Hamidi and Fadillah Yusof
- President of the Dewan Negara:
  - Rais Yatim (until 15 June)
  - Wan Junaidi Tuanku Jaafar (from 19 June)
- Speaker of the Dewan Rakyat: Johari Abdul
- Chief Justice: Tengku Maimun Tuan Mat

== State level ==
- Johor:
  - Sultan of Johor: Sultan Ibrahim
  - Menteri Besar of Johor: Onn Hafiz Ghazi
- Kedah:
  - Sultan of Kedah: Sultan Sallehuddin
  - Menteri Besar of Kedah: Muhammad Sanusi Md Nor
- Kelantan:
  - Sultan of Kelantan: Sultan Muhammad V
  - Menteri Besar of Kelantan:
    - Ahmad Yakob (until 15 August)
    - Mohd Nassuruddin Daud (from 15 August)
- Perlis:
  - Raja of Perlis: Tuanku Syed Sirajuddin
  - Menteri Besar of Perlis: Mohd Shukri Ramli
- Perak:
  - Sultan of Perak: Sultan Nazrin Muizzuddin Shah
  - Menteri Besar of Perak: Saarani Mohammad
- Pahang:
  - Sultan of Pahang: Tengku Hassanal Ibrahim Alam Shah (Regent)
  - Menteri Besar of Pahang: Wan Rosdy Wan Ismail
- Selangor:
  - Sultan of Selangor: Sultan Sharafuddin Idris Shah
  - Menteri Besar of Selangor: Amirudin Shari
- Terengganu:
  - Sultan of Terengganu: Sultan Mizan Zainal Abidin
  - Menteri Besar of Terengganu: Ahmad Samsuri Mokhtar
- Negeri Sembilan:
  - Yang di-Pertuan Besar of Negeri Sembilan: Tuanku Muhriz
  - Menteri Besar of Negeri Sembilan: Aminuddin Harun
- Penang:
  - Governor of Penang: Tun Ahmad Fuzi Abdul Razak
  - Chief Minister of Penang: Chow Kon Yeow
- Malacca:
  - Governor of Malacca: Tun Mohd Ali Rustam
  - Chief Minister of Malacca:
    - Sulaiman Md Ali (until 31 March)
    - Ab Rauf Yusoh (from 31 March)
- Sarawak:
  - Governor of Sarawak: Tun Abdul Taib Mahmud
  - Premier of Sarawak: Amar Abang Johari Abang Openg
- Sabah:
  - Governor of Sabah: Tun Juhar Mahiruddin
  - Chief Minister of Sabah: Hajiji Noor

== Events ==
=== January ===
- 1 January
  - All gaming premises and lottery shops in Kedah ceased operations and were closed following the decision of the state government not to renew their licenses that expired on 31 December 2022.
  - Tun Juhar Mahiruddin was officially reappointed and sworn in as the Governor of Sabah for his 4th term from 1 January until 31 December 2024.
  - Wisma Jakel in Shah Alam, Selangor caught on fire, burning most of the building.
- 5 January
  - Former prime minister Mohammad Najib Abdul Razak, who has been imprisoned for more than four months now, filed a petition with the United Nations Human Rights Council Working Group on Arbitrary Detention (UNWGAD) to seek his release from prison or a retrial of his SRC International Sdn Bhd case.
  - The High Court acquitted Shahrir Abdul Samad from a money-laundering case over his alleged failure to include an RM1 million cheque from Mohammad Najib Abdul Razak in his income tax declaration, after the prosecution decided to discontinue the case.
- 8 January
  - Kinabatangan MP Bung Moktar Radin stepped down as the president of the Sabah Football Association.
  - PKR fired Chua Tian Chang and 4 others.
- 9 January
  - The MCMC announced Muhammad Azmi Muhammad Zain as their new interim chairman.
  - Maqis seized 160 tonnes of pest-infested copra from Indonesia.
  - Ex-Goldman Sachs banker Roger Ng was granted a discharge not amounting to acquittal pending the outcome of his US trial (see Timeline of the 1Malaysia Development Berhad scandal.
  - The National Registration Department started digitising 150 million physical records kept since 1869.
  - KDM stated their support for Hajiji Noor as the Chief Minister of Sabah.
- 10 January
  - Online purchases under RM 500 to cost 10% extra on 1 April.
  - Malaysia receives 31600 quotas for hajj pilgrims.
  - Datuk Sudha Devi KR Vasudevan reappointed as Commonwealth Foundation chairman for a two year term.
  - Sabah introduces state bills for gas supply and Energy Commission of Sabah.
  - Entrepreneur Development Ministry deferred a repayment of RM128.6 million for microcredit loans.
  - Goh Liu Ying retirement from badminton after 13 years.
- 10 January – 2023 Sabah political crisis:
  - Chief Minister of Sabah Hajiji Noor reshuffled his cabinet after the 2023 Sabah political crisis by appointing members of the Sabah State Legislative Assembly (MLAs) of Pakatan Harapan into the cabinet and removing Barisan Nasional MLAs from the cabinet, except for those who declared support for him as Chief Minister.
- 12 January – Two Pan-Borneo Highway packages completed.

=== March ===
- 12 March – Michelle Yeoh wins the Academy Award for Best Actress at the 95th Academy Awards, becoming the first Asian woman to win in that category.
- 31 March – Member of the Malacca State Legislative Assembly (MLA) for Tanjung Bidara, Malacca Ab Rauf Yusoh was sworn in appointed as the 13th Chief Minister of Malacca.

=== April ===
- 7 April – Authorities detained a 17-year-old girl and a 22-year-old man after a video of them appearing to have sex in a Pasir Gudang car park went viral.
- 21 April – Noor Hisham Abdullah retirement as the Director-General of Health after serving for 10 years and from the career after 35 years. Deputy Director-General of Health (Research and Technical Support) Muhammad Radzi Abu Hassan promoted to replace him.

=== May ===
- 5–17 May – Malaysia at the 2023 SEA Games in Phnom Penh, Cambodia.
- 8 May – Serdang Hospital was renamed to Sultan Idris Shah Serdang Hospital after the Sultan of Selangor, Sultan Sharafuddin Idris Shah.

=== June ===
- 3–9 June – Malaysia at the 2023 ASEAN Para Games in Phnom Penh, Cambodia.
- 25 June – Prime Minister Anwar Ibrahim came under fire for a comment he made against a Form six student at a Q&A event at Universiti Sains Islam Malaysia (USIM) in Nilai, Negeri Sembilan. Education Minister Fadhlina Sidek said Anwar's controversial remark became an issue because it was "misconstrued".

=== July ===
- 11 July – Bersatu information committee member Badrul Hisham Shaharin urged Malaysian Anti-Corruption Commission (MACC) to investigate Prime Minister Anwar Ibrahim over the ownership of his personal residence in Kajang, Selangor.
- 22 July – The Good Vibes Festival in Sepang, Selangor is cancelled by the government after the 1975 member Matty Healy condemned the country's anti-LGBT laws and kissed bandmate Ross MacDonald during the band's performance the day before.

=== August ===
- 1 August – Former Prime Minister Mahathir Mohamad admitted to the National Heart Institute (IJN) for an infection. He would be discharged 3 days later.
- 4–11 August – Malaysia at the 2023 Commonwealth Youth Games in Trinidad and Tobago.
- 12 August – 2023 state elections held in Terengganu, Selangor, Negeri Sembilan, Kelantan, Kedah and Penang.
- 17 August – 2023 Elmina Beechcraft 390 crash:
  - A private jet crashed onto the Elmina interchange of the Guthrie Corridor Expressway, killing 10 people.

=== September ===
- 8 September – Death of Tunku Ampuan Najihah of Negeri Sembilan:
  - Tunku Ampuan Najihah died at the Cardiac Vascular Central Hospital in Kuala Lumpur, Malaysia, one week after celebrating her 100th birthday.
  - Her remains were laid to rest at Seri Menanti Royal Mausoleum and buried next to her husband Tuanku Ja'afar of Negeri Sembilan died on 27 December 2008.
- 23 September – 8 October – Malaysia at the 2022 Asian Games in Hangzhou, China, which was also postponed by a one year due to the COVID-19 pandemic.
  - Malaysia sending 289 athletes to completed in 22 sports. The national contingent won 6 gold, 8 silver and 18 bronze medals at the continental event.

=== October ===
- 22–28 October – Malaysia at the 2022 Asian Para Games in Hangzhou, China, which was also postponed by a one year due to the COVID-19 pandemic.
  - Malaysia sending 98 athletes to completed in 14 sports. The national contingent won 7 gold, 15 silver and 17 bronze medals at the continental event.
- 27 October – Sultan of Johor, Sultan Ibrahim has been elected as the 17th Yang di-Pertuan Agong, effective on 31 January 2024.

=== November ===
- 26 November – Prime Minister Anwar Ibrahim announces at a People's Justice Party (PKR) congress that citizens of China and India will have visa-free travel from 1 December allowing stays of up to 30 days in a bid to boost tourism.

=== December ===
- 5 December
  - The 2023 Men's FIH Hockey Junior World Cup begins.
  - 6-year old Zayn Rayyan Abdul Matiin, a non-verbal autistic boy, is reported missing from the Idaman Apartment complex in Damansara Damai, Sungai Buloh, Selangor; he would later be found dead the following day around 200 metres from the apartments. His case has been classified as murder and is being investigated under Section 302 of the Penal Code.
- 12 December – Cabinet reshuffle.
- 15 December – 18-year-old Muhammad Zaharif Affendi was killed when he was struck by a police officer's car in Ipoh, Perak.
- 17 December – 2023 Penang Bridge International Marathon.
- 20 December – Prime Minister Anwar Ibrahim announces that Israel-registered ships, and all foreign vessels heading to Israel, are banned from docking within their ports or receiving cargo.

== National Day and Malaysia Day ==
=== Theme ===
Malaysia MADANI: Tekad Perpaduan Penuhi Harapan (Civilised Malaysia: Determination of Unity, Fulfilling Hope)

=== National Day parade ===
Putrajaya Square, Persiaran Perdana, Putrajaya

=== Malaysia Day celebration ===
Unity Stadium, Kuching, Sarawak

== Deaths ==
=== January ===
- 12 January – Azlan Zainol, Chairman of Malaysia Building Society Bhd
- 22 January – Mahani Idris, Wife of former Minister of Finance, Daim Zainuddin.
- 23 January – Abd Rani Osman, Former Member of the Selangor State Legislative Assembly for Meru, Selangor.
- 29 January – Gopal Sri Ram, former Senior Deputy Public Prosecutor.

=== February ===
- 6 February – Bong Kee Chok, One of the leaders of the North Kalimantan Communist Party.
- 7 February – Tunku Abdul Aziz Ibrahim, Former Senator.
- 10 February – Yunus Rahmat, Former Member of Parliament for Jelebu, Negeri Sembilan.
- 23 February – Mohd Kamal Hassan, Former Rector of the International Islamic University Malaysia.

=== March ===
- 3 March – Lee San Choon, Acting President of the Malaysian Chinese Association.
- 8 March – Syed Razak Syed Zain Barakbah, 8th Menteri Besar of Kedah (1999–2005).

=== April ===
- 1 April – Ahmad Zaini Japar, Former Member of the Kedah State Legislative Assembly for Bukit Kayu Hitam, Kedah.
- 5 April – Onn Ismail, former Speaker of the Selangor State Legislative Assembly.
- 22 April – James Chan Soon Cheong, Former Bishop of the Malacca–Johor diocese.
- 23 April – Ramly Abu Bakar, Former newscaster and voiceover artist.
- 26 April – Fatimah Hamid Don, First Malay female professor.

=== May ===
- 12 May – Naim Mohamad, Former Deputy President of the Malaysian National Cycling Federation (MNCF) and Firdaus Muhammad Rom Harun, former Member of Parliament for Rembau and former Member of the Negeri Sembilan State Legislative Assembly for Chembong, Negeri Sembilan.
- 18 May – Razali Nawawi, The founder and 1st President of the Malaysian Islamic Youth Movement (ABIM).
- 22 May – Ismail Kassim, former Member of Parliament for Arau and former Member of the Perlis State Legislative Assembly for Tambun Tulang, Perlis.

=== July ===
- 4 July
  - Tengku Norhana, Sister of Sultan Mizan Zainal Abidin Sultan of Terengganu.
  - Abdul Ghapur Salleh, Former Member of Parliament for Kalabakan and former Deputy Chief Minister of Sabah.
- 8 July – Pahamin Rajab, Businessman and former AirAsia chairman.
- 23 July – Salahuddin Ayub, Member of Parliament for Pulai, Minister of Domestic Trade and Costs of Living.

=== August ===
- 3 August – Fatimah Sharifah Nong Alsagoff Abdillah, Mother of the Sultan Mizan Zainal Abidin.
- 5 August – Gan Teik Chai, Former badminton player.
- 17 August – Johari Harun, Member of the Pahang State Executive Council and Pahang State Legislative Assembly for Pelangai, Pahang.

=== September ===
- 8 September – Tunku Ampuan Najihah of Negeri Sembilan, 10th Raja Permaisuri Agong (1994–1999) and Tunku Ampuan Besar of Negeri Sembilan.

=== November ===
- 2 November – Natrah Ismail, Former Member of Parliament for Sekijang, Johor.
- 28 November – Queenzy Cheng, Actress and Singer.

=== December ===
- 3 December – Chua Jui Meng, Former Minister of Health.
- 5 December – Zayn Rayyan Abdul Matiin, A 6-year old and a non-verbal autistic boy.
- 15 December – Muhammad Zaharif Affendi, A 17-year old Malaysian student.
- 28 December – Rosemary Chow Poh Kheng, former Deputy Minister of Culture, Youth and Sports and first Women Chief of the Malaysian Chinese Association (MCA).
- 31 December – Stephen Sutton, Sabah butterfly conservationist and entomologist.

== See also ==
- 2023
- 2022 in Malaysia | 2024 in Malaysia
- History of Malaysia
- List of Malaysian films of 2023
