= 2022 in Malaysia =

- Decades: 2000s; 2010s; 2020s
- See also: Other events of 2022; History of Malaysia • Timeline • Years

2022 in Malaysia is 65th anniversary of Malaysia's independence and 59th anniversary of its formation of Malaysia.

== Federal level ==
- Yang di-Pertuan Agong: Al-Sultan Abdullah Ri'ayatuddin Al-Mustafa Billah Shah of Pahang
- Raja Permaisuri Agong: Tunku Azizah Aminah Maimunah Iskandariah of Pahang
- Deputy Yang di-Pertuan Agong: Sultan Nazrin Muizzuddin Shah of Perak
- Prime Minister:
  - Ismail Sabri Yaakob (until 10 October; caretaker from 10 October until 24 November)
  - Anwar Ibrahim (from 24 November)
- Deputy Prime Minister:
  - Ahmad Zahid Hamidi (from 3 December)
  - Fadillah Yusof (from 3 December)
- President of the Dewan Negara: Rais Yatim
- Speaker of the Dewan Rakyat:
  - Azhar Azizan Harun (until 18 December)
  - Johari Abdul (from 19 December)
- Chief Justice: Tengku Maimun Tuan Mat

== State level ==
- Johor:
  - Sultan of Johor: Sultan Ibrahim
  - Menteri Besar of Johor:
    - Hasni Mohammad (until 15 March)
    - Onn Hafiz Ghazi (from 15 March)
- Kedah:
  - Sultan of Kedah: Sultan Sallehuddin
  - Menteri Besar of Kedah: Muhammad Sanusi Md Nor
- Kelantan:
  - Sultan of Kelantan: Sultan Muhammad V
  - Menteri Besar of Kelantan: Ahmad Yakob
- Perlis:
  - Raja of Perlis: Tuanku Syed Sirajuddin
  - Menteri Besar of Perlis:
    - Azlan Man (until 22 November)
    - Mohd Shukri Ramli (from 22 November)
- Perak:
  - Sultan of Perak: Sultan Nazrin Muizzuddin Shah
  - Menteri Besar of Perak: Saarani Mohammad
- Pahang:
  - Sultan of Pahang: Tengku Hassanal Ibrahim Alam Shah (Regent)
  - Menteri Besar of Pahang: Wan Rosdy Wan Ismail
- Selangor:
  - Sultan of Selangor: Sultan Sharafuddin Idris Shah
  - Menteri Besar of Selangor: Amirudin Shari
- Terengganu:
  - Sultan of Terengganu: Sultan Mizan Zainal Abidin
  - Menteri Besar of Terengganu: Ahmad Samsuri Mokhtar
- Negeri Sembilan:
  - Yang di-Pertuan Besar of Negeri Sembilan: Tuanku Muhriz
  - Menteri Besar of Negeri Sembilan: Aminuddin Harun
- Penang:
  - Governor of Penang: Tun Ahmad Fuzi Abdul Razak
  - Chief Minister of Penang: Chow Kon Yeow
- Malacca:
  - Governor of Malacca: Tun Mohd Ali Rustam
  - Chief Minister of Malacca: Sulaiman Md Ali
- Sarawak:
  - Governor of Sarawak: Tun Abdul Taib Mahmud
  - Premier of Sarawak: Amar Abang Johari Abang Openg
- Sabah:
  - Governor of Sabah: Tun Juhar Mahiruddin
  - Chief Minister of Sabah: Hajiji Noor

== Events ==
=== January ===
- 3 January – Ayob Khan Mydin Pitchay takes over as the Bukit Aman Narcotics Crime Investigation Department commissioner after a stint in Johor.
- 7 January
  - Former prime minister Mahathir Mohamad has been admitted to the National Heart Institute for an elective procedure. The NHI said in a statement that he was admitted for an elective medical procedure and that due to current SOPs, Mahathir was not permitted visitors.
  - Molek FM is launched for the East Coast states.
- 9 January – A train did not stop at Kuala Gris station in Kuala Krai, causing 100 SMK Dabong students to miss school.
- 10 January – Former prime minister Mohammad Najib Abdul Razak will not be taking the stand as a defence witness in his wife Rosmah Mansor's corruption trial linked to the RM1.25 billion solar hybrid energy project.
- 13 January – Former prime minister Mahathir Mohamad has been discharged from National Heart Institute (IJN) after successfully undergoing an elective medical procedure on 7 January.
- 15 January – COVID-19 pandemic in Malaysia:
  - 36 more Omicron cases are found in four parts of Sarawak, namely Kuching, Samarahan, Sibu and Kapit.
- 15 January – RFID payment is made available along the entire North-South Expressway from today, in preparation for the eventual phasing out of Touch 'n Go and SmartTAG options on the expressway.
- 19 January – Badminton player Lee Zii Jia resigns from the Badminton Association of Malaysia (BAM) to become an independent player. Lee was slapped with a two-year ban by the BAM two days later. Lee later appealed, resulting in the ban being lifted on 25 January after a deal.
- 20 January – Grand opening of the first Mitsui Shopping Park LaLaport mall in Southeast Asia at Bukit Bintang City Centre located at Bukit Bintang, Kuala Lumpur, Malaysia.
- 22 January
  - A spokesperson from the office of Mahathir Mohamad has confirmed that the former prime minister is currently being treated at the National Heart Institute (IJN)'s coronary care unit (CCU).
  - Prime Minister Ismail Sabri Yaakob arrived at the National Heart Institute (IJN) to visit Mahathir Mohamad.
- 24 January
  - Former deputy prime minister Ahmad Zahid Hamidi has been ordered to enter his defence against all 47 criminal breach of trust (CBT), corruption and money laundering charges involving funds from Yayasan Akalbudi, a charity foundation which he had set up.
  - Former prime minister Mohammad Najib Abdul Razak is seeking to appoint a Queen's Counsel from the United Kingdom to act on his behalf in his appeal to quash his conviction in the RM42 million SRC International corruption case.
- 25 January – Five vehicles were damaged due to a landslip with no casualties reported.
- 26 January
  - Former prime minister Mahathir Mohamad's health has improved well enough for him to be moved to a normal ward from the coronary care unit (CCU) at the National Heart Institute (IJN).
  - A tornado ripped through in Bukit Kayu Hitam, Kedah caused damage as a result.
- 27 January – The Court of Appeal has dismissed an appeal by former prime minister Mohammad Najib Abdul Razak to reinstate his lawsuit against former banker Joanna Yu, AmBank Islamic Bhd and AMMB Holdings Bhd. In a unanimous decision, a three-man panel chaired by Justice Yaacob Md Sam ruled that there was no appealable error by the learned High Court judge that could warrant appellate intervention. The court also granted costs of RM40,000 to both the Ambank entities and RM35,000 costs to Yu.
- 28 January – AirAsia is renamed Capital A to reflect its new focus in the digital industry.
- 30 January – A tornado ripped through in Ipoh, Perak with 100 trees felled and 219 houses caused damage as a result.

=== February ===
- 1 February
  - Scotiabank plans to exit Malaysia after 49 years by year-end.
  - An express train catches fire in Pasir Mas. No injuries are reported in this incident.
  - Kuala Lumpur celebrates 50 years since it was granted city status with new plans unveiled for sustainability.
- 2 February – A fire at the Pulau Burung landfill is completely extinguished after it began on 12 January.
- 4 February – Former prime minister Mohammad Najib Abdul Razak's wife Rosmah Mansor's bribery and corruption trial has been delayed once again as the final witness was unable to attend the court proceedings.
- 4–20 February – Malaysia at the 2022 Winter Olympics in Beijing, China.
- 5 February – Former prime minister Mahathir Mohamad has been discharged from the National Heart Institute (IJN).
- 9 February
  - The Commercial Division of the Kuala Lumpur High Court has granted an ex-parte Mareva injunction to 1MDB and its subsidiaries to freeze former prime minister Mohammad Najib Abdul Razak or his agents in relation to their claim of US$681 million allegedly going into his personal bank account. The ex-parte application given by judicial commissioner Atan Mustaffa Yussof Ahmad only allowed Najib to withdraw up to RM100,000 monthly from his bank accounts to meet his expenditure or living expenses.
  - Former prime minister Mahathir Mohamad is close to full recovery after being discharged from the National Heart Institute (IJN). He said in a video clip uploaded to his Facebook page that he could now carry out various daily activities and hoped to fully recover.
- 11 February
  - The Malaysian United Democratic Alliance is launched as a political party.
  - Constitutional amendments restoring Sabah and Sarawak as equal partners with Malaya are now in force.
- 15 February – Sarawak Legislative Assembly passes Bill to rename the title of the head of the state's executive branch from 'Chief Minister' to 'Premier'.
- 22 February – Former Treasury secretary-general Mohd Irwan Serigar Abdullah has applied to strike out the suit filed by 1MDB against him and former chief executive officer Arul Kanda Kandasamy to pay US$6.59 billion (RM27.6 billion).
- 23 February – The star witness in the bribery trial of former Goldman Sachs Group Inc banker Roger Ng testified that ex-Goldman chief Lloyd Blankfein met in 2009 with then Malaysian prime minister Mohammad Najib Abdul Razak ahead of a US$6.5bil (RM27.2bil) in bond deals for the country's wealth fund – and that the meeting came with an agenda. In return for the lucrative business, Goldman was to get Najib's three children jobs at the bank.
- 24 February – Najib's daughter Nooryana Najwa Najib has confirmed that she did try to apply for a job at Goldman Sachs. She said she once met two former Goldman Sachs employees, Roger Ng and Tim Leissner as part of her networking efforts to land a "competitive job".
- 25 February – Rohana Rozhan has pledged to work with the Malaysian Anti-Corruption Commission (MACC) in a probe linking her to a US$10 million (RM41.8 million) London home allegedly purchased using 1Malaysia Development Berhad (1MDB) money and gifted to her.
- 27 February – Health Minister Khairy Jamaluddin said he will review a video depicting former prime minister Mohammad Najib Abdul Razak purportedly violating COVID-19 standard operating procedure (SOP) during a campaign visit in Perling, Johor.
- 28 February – Opposition leader Anwar Ibrahim submitted a motion to discuss the disclosure of corruption, abuse of power and institutional malpractice, especially on Bank Negara in relation to the 1MDB scandal.

=== March ===
- 2 March
  - The Federal Court rejected former prime minister Mohammad Najib Abdul Razak's application to vacate the appeal hearing dates on new evidence, which is scheduled on 15 and 16 March.
  - Najib told the Dewan Rakyat that not a single sen of public funds has been used by the government to repay the principal amount of 1Malaysia Development Berhad (1MDB) debts. He said this is because various entities, including Goldman Sachs, audit firms KPMG and Deloitte, Ambank and the US Department of Justice (DOJ) had returned 1MDB funds totalling RM23 billion to Malaysia.
- 3 March – The High Court in Kuala Lumpur dismissed an application by former prime minister Mohammad Najib Abdul Razak and former Treasury secretary-general Mohd Irwan Serigar Abdullah for them to be given a discharge not amounting to an acquittal (DNAA) on six counts of criminal breach of trust (CBT) amounting to RM6.6 billion involving the International Petroleum Investment Company (IPIC).
- 7 March – Former prime minister Mohammad Najib Abdul Razak has been asked to explain to the Dewan Rakyat on Wednesday his remarks on 1MDB during last week's debate which were said to have misled the august House. Dewan Rakyat Speaker Azhar Azizan Harun said he had written a letter to Najib, to seek clarification on the matter and asked him to reply.
- 9 March – Former prime minister Mahathir Mohamad confirmed he would not be contesting or defending his Langkawi parliamentary seat in the next general election.
- 12 March – 2022 Johor state election:
  - Barisan Nasional won the state election by winning 40 seats.
- 16 March – A five-member Federal Court bench led by Chief Justice Tengku Maimun Tuan Mat has unanimously dismissed former prime minister Mohammad Najib Abdul Razak's appeal to adduce more evidence to the SRC International Sdn Bhd graft case in a bid to overturn his conviction and sentence.

=== April ===
- 5 April – The Royal Malaysia Police (PDRM) has confirmed that there is no new investigation being conducted on former Prime Minister Mahathir Mohamad.
- 13 April – The suit filed by Mohamed Apandi Ali against former Prime Minister Mahathir Mohamad and the Malaysian government over the termination of his contract as the Attorney-General (AG), has been settled amicably at the High Court.
- 15 April – Japanese Ambassador to Malaysia Takahashi Katsuhiko thanked former Prime Minister Mahathir Mohamad for initiating the Look East Policy (LEP) in 1982, aimed at social and economic development in Malaysia through Japanese patronage and guidance.
- 20 April – UMNO president Ahmad Zahid Hamidi has filed a defamation suit against former prime minister Mahathir Mohamad.
- 25 April – Former prime minister Mohammad Najib Abdul Razak has submitted 94 grounds in his petition of appeal on why he should be freed of the charges of misappropriating RM42 million in SRC International Sdn Bhd funds.
- 29 April – Bank Negara Malaysia awards digital bank licences to five consortia, being Boost Holdings and RHB Bank, GXS Bank and Kuok Brothers, Sea Limited and YTL Digital Capital for the main banks, and AEON Financial Service, AEON Credit Service and MoneyLion, KAF Investment Bank for the Islamic banks.

=== May ===
- 9 May – The Federal Court has fixed 10 days in August to hear former prime minister Mohammad Najib Abdul Razak's final bid against his conviction and jail sentence for misappropriation of RM42mil in SRC International Sdn Bhd funds.
- 10 May – Former prime minister Mohammad Najib Abdul Razak and his son Nazifuddin Najib can appeal to the Federal Court over a summary judgment entered against them regarding the payment of income tax amounting to RM1.69 billion and RM37.6 million respectively to the Inland Revenue Board (IRB).
- 12 May – The Kuala Lumpur High Court has set July 7 to deliver its verdict on the corruption trial involving Rosmah Mansor, the wife of former prime minister Mohammad Najib Abdul Razak.
- 12–23 May – Malaysia at the 2021 SEA Games in Hanoi, Vietnam, which was also postponed by a one year due to the COVID-19 pandemic.
- 20 May – Former prime minister Mohammad Najib Abdul Razak declined to comment over the issue of an alleged "wedding" photo of him with a woman that went viral two days ago.
- 26 May
  - Opening of the first Zepp Hall in Malaysia, Zepp Kuala Lumpur, at the Entertainment Hub of Bukit Bintang City Centre (BBCC) in Bukit Bintang, Kuala Lumpur.
  - The Sessions Court sentenced former Sabah state executive Councillor Peter Anthony to three years imprisonment and a fine of RM50,000 after he was found guilty of forging a letter for a Mechanical and Electrical Systems (M&E) maintenance work at Universiti Malaysia Sabah (UMS).

=== June ===
- 8 June – Former prime minister Mohammad Najib Abdul Razak's legal team has filed a fresh bid to nullify the SRC International trial. The filing with the Federal Court seeks to disqualify judge Mohd Nazlan Mohd Ghazali over conflicts of interest.
- 16 June – The official launch for Phase 1 of the second MRT line in Klang Valley, known as the MRT Putrajaya Line (SSP Line), by Prime Minister Ismail Sabri Yaakob. A 1-month free ride for all public transportation services in Kuala Lumpur was also announced following the launch of the new line.

=== July ===
- 1 July – The Kuala Lumpur High Court has postponed the verdict for Rosmah Mansor's solar corruption case to 1 September.
- 8 July – The Attorney General's Chambers (AGC) has denied allegations that it nullified former prime minister Mohammad Najib Abdul Razak's SRC International proceedings. It said the allegations that the case is nullified because of an error in proceedings are fake.
- 10 July – Born on 10 July 1925, former prime minister Mahathir Mohamad turns to age 97.
- 15 July – Former Prime Minister Mahathir Mohamad paid a condolence visit to the home of slain former Japanese Prime Minister Shinzo Abe in Tokyo, as he stopped over in Japan on his way back from South Korea.
- 26 July – Former prime minister Mohammad Najib Abdul Razak has discharged his lead defence lawyer Mohamed Shafee Abdullah and the latter's law firm from representing him in his final appeal against his guilty verdict over the misappropriation of SRC International Sdn Bhd's RM42 million. Najib confirmed that Hisyam Teh Poh Teik would be his lead counsel in the SRC appeal, while the law firm Zaid Ibrahim Suflan TH Liew & Partners will be the solicitors for this case.
- 28 July – 8 August – Malaysia at the 2022 Commonwealth Games in Birmingham, England.
- 29 July – Dewan Rakyat passes anti-party-hoping law with 2/3 majority
- 30 July – 6 August – Malaysia at the 2022 ASEAN Para Games in Surakarta (Solo), Indonesia, which was also replacing from Hanoi, Vietnam by a one year due to the COVID-19 pandemic.

=== August ===
- 2 August – US House of Representatives Speaker Nancy Pelosi and her congressional delegation arrived in Malaysia as part of the second-leg of their Indo-Pacific tour.
- 9 August – The launch of Apple Pay in Malaysia.
- 12–21 August – 2022 Sukipt Games in Sultan Idris Education University.
- 23 August
  - The Federal Court has affirmed former prime minister Mohammad Najib Abdul Razak's conviction and sentence in the SRC International case. With the decision, Najib becomes the first former prime minister in the history of Malaysia to be jailed.
  - Chief Justice Tengku Maimun Tuan Mat said the defence was so inherently inconsistent, it failed to raise reasonable doubt, adding that the conviction was safe on all seven charges and that the sentence was not excessive.
  - Najib arrived at the Kajang Prison in a black SUV at around 6.10pm.
  - Following the Federal Court's affirmation of Najib's conviction and sentence, his daughter Nooryana Najwa said Najib "did not stand a fighting chance" in the trial. She said "But Bossku (Najib's moniker) does not end here".
  - Former prime minister Mahathir Mohamad said that Najib might be able to receive a royal pardon for his conviction over the 1MDB scandal like what had happened to Anwar Ibrahim previously for his sodomy charges.
  - Former Prime Minister Muhyiddin Yassin said the decision of the Federal Court proved the country's judiciary system is independent and could ensure justice, and the decision has restored the tarnished dignity of the country.
  - Opposition leader Anwar Ibrahim said the court's decision "proves the people are powerful and have made a decision to ensure the judiciary is free to clean the country of corruption".
  - The Centre to Combat Corruption & Cronyism (C4) applauded the sentencing of Najib, calling it a monumental victory for Malaysians and the judiciary.
- 24 August
  - Barely 24 hours after disgraced former prime minister Mohammad Najib Abdul Razak began his prison sentence, Prime Minister Ismail Sabri Yaakob arrived at Umno headquarters for a political bureau meeting.
  - The Prisons Department has denied that Najib is given special treatment at the Kajang Prison.
- 25 August
  - After spending three days behind bars, former prime minister Mohammad Najib Abdul Razak is back at the Court Complex for his other corruption trial over the misappropriation of RM2.3 billion of 1Malaysia Development Berhad (1MDB) funds.
  - The prestigious Royal Lake Club has removed disgraced and incarcerated Najib as its patron.
- 31 August – Former Prime Minister Mahathir Mohamad tested positive for COVID-19. He has been admitted to the National Heart Institute (IJN) for observation for the next few days as advised by the medical team.

=== September ===
- 1 September
  - Rosmah Mansor, the wife of former prime minister Mohammad Najib Abdul Razak, has been sentenced to 10 years in jail and fined RM970 million after being found guilty of corruption in connection with the RM1.25 billion Sarawak rural schools' solar energy project.
  - Pengerang MP Azalina Othman Said has resigned as Prime Minister Ismail Sabri Yaakob's special adviser for law and human rights. Azalina had said whoever became prime minister would usually appoint "one of their own" to become the AG, a post which came with wide-ranging powers. Her comments drew criticisms from Bersatu and Pakatan Harapan leaders.
- 2 September – Sabah Deputy Chief Minister Bung Moktar Radin and his wife Zizie Izette Abdul Samad have been ordered to enter their defence on all three charges of corruption amounting to RM2.8mil over unit trust investments.
- 4 September
  - Former prime minister Mahathir Mohamad has been discharged from the National Heart Institute.
  - Former prime minister Mohammad Najib Abdul Razak who is serving his 12-years jail sentence was admitted to the Kuala Lumpur Hospital (HKL) for treatment.
- 7 September
  - The prosecution in the 1Malaysia Development Berhad (1MDB) audit tampering case involving former prime minister Mohammad Najib Abdul Razak and former 1MDB chief executive officer Arul Kanda Kandasamy has wrapped up its case.
  - The Prisons Department has denied allegations that former prime minister Mohammad Najib Abdul Razak was placed in a house within the prison grounds.
- 12 September – The Sultan of Selangor, Sultan Sharafuddin Idris Shah revoked the title given by the state to former prime minister Mohammad Najib Abdul Razak and his wife Rosmah Mansor following their conviction of criminal cases. Najib was conferred the Keahlian Darjah Kebesaran Seri Paduka Mahkota Selangor (SPMS) First Class, which carries the title Datuk Seri in 2004 and the Darjah Kebesaran Dato' Paduka Mahkota Selangor (DPMS) Second Class, which comes with the title Datuk, in 1992.
- 15 September – Governor of Penang Tun Ahmad Fuzi Abdul Razak has agreed to withdraw the Darjah Utama Pangkuan Negeri (DUPN) award that was given to former prime minister Mohammad Najib Abdul Razak. Najib was awarded the DUPN, which carries the title Datuk Seri Utama, in 2009.
- 17–24 September – 2022 Sukma Games in Kuala Lumpur, Malaysia.
- 28 September – Former Prime Minister Mohammad Najib Abdul Razak's review application to overturn his conviction and jail sentence in the RM42 million SRC International corruption case has been set for case management before the apex court on October 21.

=== October ===
- 10 October – 2022 Malaysian general election (GE15):
  - During a special televised address to the nation, Prime Minister Ismail Sabri Yaakob announced the dissolution of the 14th Parliament effective immediately after having an audience with and getting consent from the Yang di-Pertuan Agong Al-Sultan Abdullah Ri'ayatuddin Al-Mustafa Billah Shah of Pahang a day prior on 9 October 2022, paving the way for the 15th general election to be held within 60 days, by 9 December 2022.
- 11 October – 2022 Malaysian general election (GE15):
  - Former prime minister Mahathir Mohamad, 97, has declared that he will be defending his Langkawi seat in the upcoming 15th general election (GE15).
- 20 October – 2022 Malaysian general election (GE15):
  - The Election Commission (EC) during a special meeting chaired by its Chairman Abdul Ghani Salleh selected and declared 5 November as the nomination day, 15 November as the early polling day and 19 November as the polling day for GE15, Perlis, Perak and Pahang state election. Therefore, the campaigning period is from 5 until 19 November, which is from the nomination to polling days, for 14 days in total.
- 25 October – The Prisons Department said there were no video recordings involving former prime minister Mohammad Najib Abdul Razak made by any media agencies in the prison premises as claimed. The department said checks showed that the video in question was pre-recorded by Radio Televisyen Malaysia for Episode 57 of Kembara Keluarga Malaysia programme before Najib was sentenced to prison.
- 25 October – 2022 Malaysian general election (GE15):
  - Former Prime Minister Mahathir Mohamad is unfazed by the Government's decision not to allow the use of Gerakan Tanah Air (GTA), saying that the coalition will use Parti Pejuang Tanah Air (Pejuang) for the upcoming 15th General Elections.
- 26 October
  - Former prime minister Mahathir Mohamad has questioned why no investigation was launched against former attorney general (AG) Mohamed Apandi Ali over his handling of the 1Malaysia Development Berhad scandal. He further contrasted Apandi's case with that of disgraced former prime minister Mohammad Najib Abdul Razak, who is currently serving jailtime for his involvement in the multi-million ringgit corruption scandal.
  - UMNO vice-president Ismail Sabri Yaakob said his party does not have the power to grant former prime minister Mohammad Najib Abdul Razak a pardon for his crimes even if it wins the 15th general election (GE15).
- 27 October – The High Court dismissed former prime minister Mohammad Najib Abdul Razak's legal challenge over the Prisons Department's refusal to allow his request to attend Dewan Rakyat proceedings. Judge Ahmad Kamal Md Shahid ruled that there is no live issue to be considered by the court as Najib is no longer a Member of Parliament after the dissolution of Parliament on 10 October.
- 28 October
  - MUDA president Syed Saddiq has been ordered to enter his defence on charges of abetting in criminal breach of trust (CBT), misappropriation of assets and money laundering. Judicial Commissioner Azhar Abdul Hamid said the prosecution had proven their case beyond doubt.

=== November ===
- 1–6 November – 2022 Para Sukma Games in Kuala Lumpur, Malaysia.
- 15 November – The Kuala Lumpur High Court has fixed Jan 30 next year to decide whether former prime minister Mohammad Najib Abdul Razak and former 1Malaysia Development Berhad (1MDB) chief executive officer Arul Kanda Kandasamy will be acquitted or ordered to enter their defence on the audit tampering case.
- 19 November – The 15th Malaysian general election (GE15) was held, producing a hung parliament where Pakatan Harapan and Perikatan Nasional won almost the same seats.
- 24 November – Anwar Ibrahim becomes Malaysia's as the 10th Prime Minister at Istana Negara, Jalan Tuanku Abdul Halim, Kuala Lumpur, Malaysia.

=== December ===
- 3 December – Prime Minister Anwar Ibrahim appointed controversial figure Ahmad Zahid Hamidi as deputy prime minister. Ahmad Zahid was charged on corruption charges. Coalition for Clean and Fair Elections (Bersih) expressed its disappointment. Anwar also appointed himself become Finance Minister, breaking the rule that the prime minister should not also be the finance minister since Mohammad Najib Abdul Razak's downfall in 2018.
- 11 December – 2022 Penang Bridge International Marathon.
- 13 December – Beh Gaik Lean, chef of Auntie Gaaik Lean's Old School Eatery becomes the first Malaysian woman chef to receive a Michelin star.
- 16 December – 2022 Batang Kali landslide:
  - A landslide in Batang Kali, Selangor, kills at least 31 people, 61 people survived the landslide.
- 17 December – Parti Pejuang Tanah Air (PEJUANG) president Mukhriz Mahathir says PEJUANG accepts Mahathir Mohamad's decision to step down as chairman.
- 24 December – Infamous pro-BN NGO leader Ramesh Rao become Deputy Prime Minister Ahmad Zahid Hamidi's special officer in charge of Indian affairs.

== National Day and Malaysia Day ==
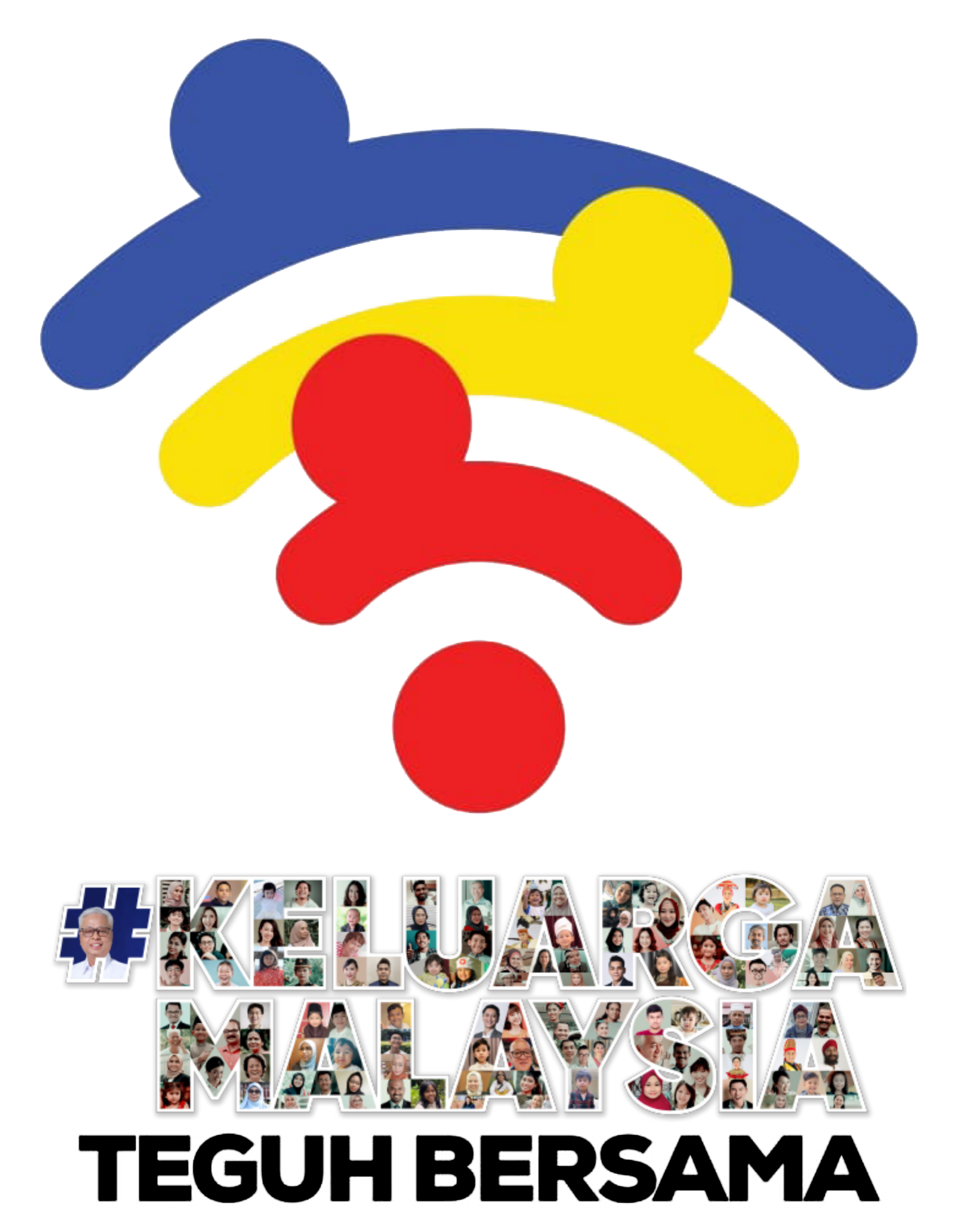
The official logo

=== Theme ===
Keluarga Malaysia Teguh Bersama (Malaysian Family: Stronger Together)

=== National Day parade ===
Merdeka Square, Kuala Lumpur

=== Malaysia Day celebration ===
Heroes Square, Malacca City, Malacca

== Deaths ==
=== January ===
- 12 January – Shebby Singh, Former football player.
- 26 January – Pian Cecupak, Comedian.
- 28 January – Tun Abang Muhammad Salahuddin, 3rd and 6th Governor of Sarawak (1977–1981; 2001–2014).
- 30 January – Abdul Rahman Sulaiman, former chairman of Bernama and Member of Parliament for Parit Buntar, Perak.

=== February ===
- 5 February – Marc Lourdes, Former journalist.
- 12 February – Jit Murad, Actor, Writer, Playwright, and Theater Activist.

=== March ===
- 15 March – Norpipah Abdol, EXCO of Malacca and former Member of Malacca State Legislative Assembly for Rembia, Malacca.
- 28 March – Raja Izuddin Chulan, Raja Kecil Bongsu of Perak.

=== April ===
- 21 April – Ali Hamsa, 13th Chief Secretary to the Government of Malaysia.
- 29 April – Tengku Ahmad Rithauddeen Ismail, former Minister of Defence.

=== May ===
- 1 May – Douglas K.K. Lee, politician.

=== June ===
- 14 June
  - Arshad Ayub, Pro-Chancellor of Universiti Teknologi MARA.
  - Hamid Gurkha, Actor and Comedian.
- 18 June – Adibah Noor, Singer and Actress.

=== July ===
- 5 July – Subramaniam Sinniah, Former Deputy President of the Malaysian Indian Congress.
- 16 July – Sieh Kok Chi, Former Secretary general of the Olympic Council of Malaysia and Malaysian sports figures.
- 31 July – Abdul Khalid Ibrahim, 15th Menteri Besar of Selangor (2008–2014).

=== August ===
- 3 August – Ng Boon Bee, Former badminton player.
- 15 August – Gan Boon Leong, Former Asian bodybuilding champion and Malacca exco.
- 17 August – Chen Man Hin, Life Advisor and former National Chairman of the Democratic Action Party.
- 18 August – Zurina Kassim, wife of former Governor of Malacca, Tun Mohd Khalil Yaakob (2004–2020).
- 22 August – Abdul Halim Abdul Rahman, former Deputy Menteri Besar of Kelantan and former MP for Pengkalan Chepa, Kelantan.

=== September ===
- 15 September – Samy Vellu, former Cabinet minister, former President of Malaysian Indian Congress and former MP for Sungai Siput, Perak.
- 21 September – Mohd Adib Mohamad Adam, 5th Chief Minister of Malacca (1978–1982).
- 23 September – Bob Lokman, Veteran rock Lyricist and Actor.

=== October ===
- 20 October – Samsuddin Yahya, Former Sabah state assemblyman for Sekong, Sabah.

=== November ===
- 16 November – Karupaiya Mutusami, MP for Padang Serai, Kedah and Pakatan Harapan (PH) candidate for the seat in the 2022 general election.
- 19 November – Md Yunus Ramli, Perikatan Nasional (PN) candidate for the Tioman seat in the 2022 Pahang state election.
- 28 November – Nawawi Ahmad, Former MP for Langkawi, Kedah.

=== December ===
- 1 December – Abdul Hamid Pawanteh, 6th Menteri Besar of Perlis (1986–1995) and 14th President of the Dewan Negara (2003–2009).
- 6 December – Abdul Aziz Yassin, Former MP for Muar, Johor and brother of former Prime Minister Muhyiddin Yassin (2020–2021).
- 12 December – Teh Hong Piow, Founder of Public Bank Berhad.

== See also ==
- 2022
- 2021 in Malaysia | 2023 in Malaysia
- History in Malaysia
- List of Malaysian films of 2022
