= Al-Ghufran Royal Mausoleum =

Burial site in Kuala Kangsar, Malaysia

Coordinates: 4°45′54″N 100°57′02.3″E

Al-Ghufran Royal Mausoleum Makam Diraja Al-Ghufran مقام دراج الغفران
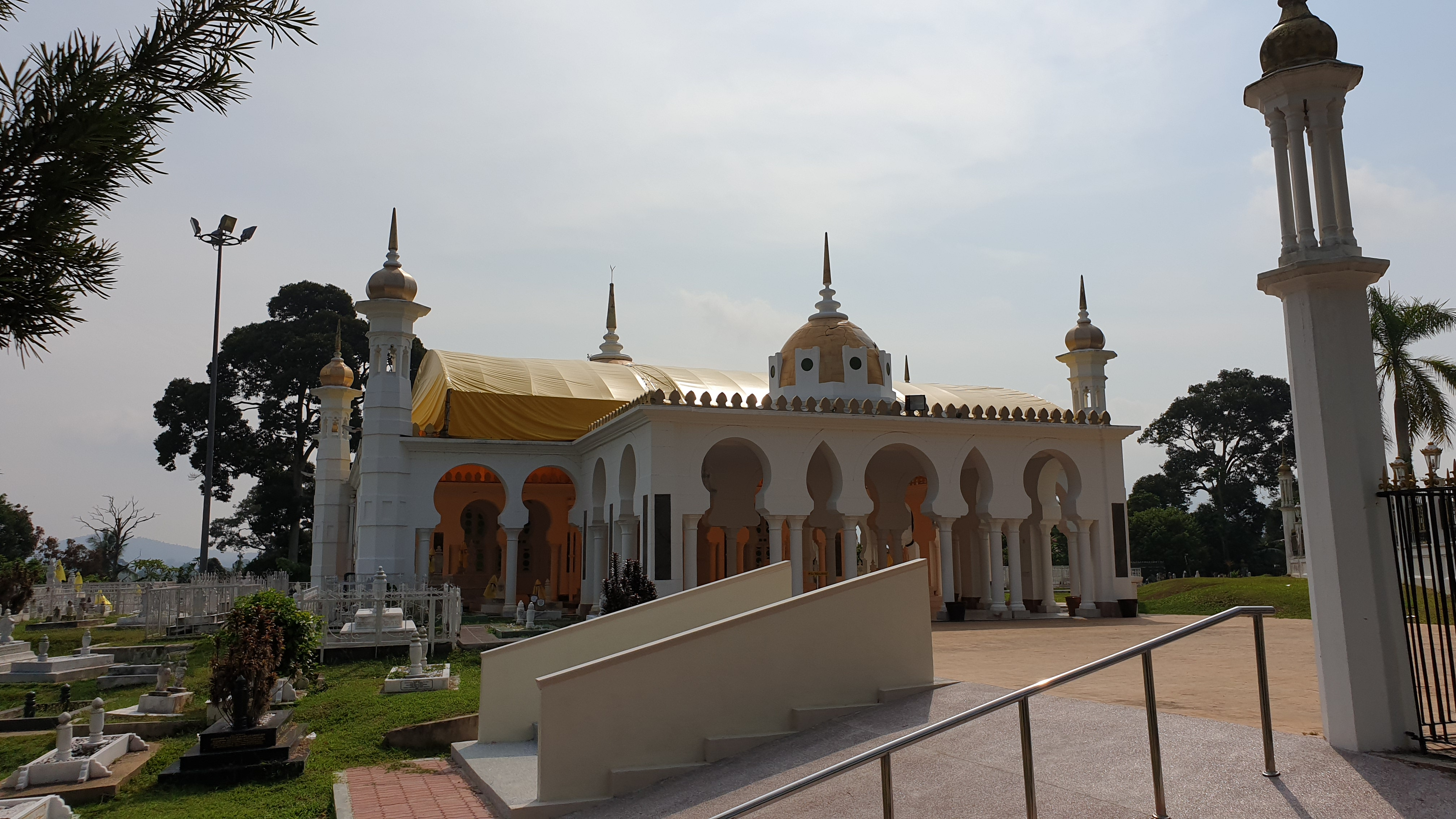

Religion
- Affiliation: Islam
- Leadership: Perak Royal Family

Location
- Location: Kuala Kangsar, Perak; Malaysia
- Interactive map of Al-Ghufran Royal Mausoleum; Makam Diraja Al-Ghufran مقام دراج الغفران

Architecture
- Type: Royal Mausoleum
- Style: Moghul
- Completed: 1915

Specifications
- Dome: 3
- Minaret: 4

The Al-Ghufran Royal Mausoleum (Malay: Makam Diraja Al-Ghufran) is a Royal Mausoleum of Perak located near Ubudiah Mosque at Bukit Chandan in Jalan Istana, Kuala Kangsar, Malaysia. The first Sultan of Perak buried here was Sultan Idris Murshidul Azzam Shah I in 1916.

== Architecture ==
The Al-Ghufran Royal Mausoleum was built in 1915. The Moghul style of architecture of the mausoleum is similar to that of the Taj Mahal in India.

== List of royal graves ==
=== Sultan ===
- Sultan Idris Murshidul Azzam Shah I Ibni Almarhum Raja Bendahara Alang Iskandar Teja (Marhum Rahmatullah) (died: 14 January 1916)
- Sultan Abdul Jalil Karamatullah Nasiruddin Mukhataram Shah Ibni Almarhum Sultan Idris Murshidul Adzam Shah I Rahmatullah (Marhum Radziallah) (died: 26 October 1918)
- Sultan Abdullah Muhammad Shah II Ibni Almarhum Sultan Jaafar Safiuddin Muadzam Shah Waliullah (Marhum Habibullah) (died: 22 December 1922)
- Sultan Iskandar Shah Ibni Almarhum Sultan Idris Murshidul Azzam Shah I Rahmatullah (Marhum Kaddasullah) (died: 14 October 1938)
- Sultan Abdul Aziz Al-Mutasim Billah Shah Ibni Almarhum Raja Muda Musa (Marhum Nikmatullah) (died: 29 March 1948)
- Sultan Yussuf Izzuddin Shah Ibni Almarhum Sultan Abdul Jalil Karamatullah Nasiruddin Mukhataram Shah Radziallah (Marhum Ghafarullahu-lah) (died: 4 January 1963)
- Sultan Idris Iskandar Al-Mutawakkil Alallahi Shah II Ibni Almarhum Sultan Iskandar Shah Kaddasullah (Marhum Afifullah) (died: 31 January 1984)
- Sultan Azlan Muhibbuddin Shah Ibni Almarhum Sultan Yussuf Izzuddin Shah Ghafarullahu-lah (Marhum Al-Maghfullah) - 9th Yang di-Pertuan Agong (1989–1994) (died: 28 May 2014)

=== Raja Perempuan/Pemaisuri (Queen) ===
- Raja Tipah Binti Almarhum Sultan Haji Shahabuddin Riayat Shah Saifullah (died: unknown date)
- Raja Nuteh Aishah Binti Almarhum Sultan Haji Yussuf Sharrifuddin Muzaffar Shah Ghafirullah (died: 6 October 1920)
- Raja Nuteh Zahra Binti Almarhum Sultan Haji Ali al-Mukammal Inayat Shah Nabiallah (died: unknown date)
- Raja Puteh Umi Kalsom Binti Almarhum Raja Haji Kulop Muhammad Kramat (died: 9 May 1972)
- Raja Khalijah Binti Almarhum Sultan Haji sir Idris Murshidul al-Azzam Shah I Rahmatullah (died: 1 October 1939)
- Raja Taayah Binti Almarhum Raja Bendahara Haji Abdul Hamid (died: 18 February 1962)
- Raja Muzwin Binti Almarhum Raja Haji Ariff Shah (died: 6 October 2011)

== Royal Families ==
- Raja Musa I Ibni Almarhum Sultan Jaafar Safiuddin Muadzam Shah Waliullah - (Raja Muda of Perak) (died: 1906)
- Raja Jafar Billah Ibni Almarhum Raja Muda Musa I (died: 1926)
- Raja Haji Ngah Muhammad Mansur Ibni Almarhum Sultan Abdullah Muhammad Shah II Habibullah (died: 27 August 1934)
- Raja Sir Chulan Ibni Almarhum Sultan Abdullah Muhammad Shah II Habibullah - (Raja Di-Hilir of Perak) (died: 10 April 1933)
- Raja Haji Zainal Azman Shah Ibni Almarhum Raja Haji Sir Chulan Abdullah Muhammad Shah II - (Raja Kecil Bongsu of Perak) (died: 16 December 1956)
- Raja Haji Abdul Rashid Ibni Almarhum Sultan Idris Murshidul Azzam Shah I Rahmatullah - (Raja Bendahara of Perak) (died: 24 November 1958)
- Raja Haji Kamarulzaman Ibni Almarhum Raja Haji Ngah Muhammad Mansur Abdullah Muhammad Shah II Habibullah - (Raja Di-Hilir of Perak) (died: 19 July 1962)
- Raja Haji Lope Nur Rashid Ibni Almarhum Raja Haji Abdul Rahman Abdullah Muhammad Shah II Habibullah - (Raja Kecil Besar of Perak) (died: 19 June 1946)
- Raja Haji Al-Ikram Shah Ibni Almarhum Sultan Haji sir Yussuf Izzuddin Shah Ghafarullahu-lah - (Raja Di-Hilir of Perak) (died: 9 June 1978)
- Raja haji Musa II Ibni Almarhum Sultan Abdul Aziz al-Mutassim Billah Shah Nikmatullah - (Raja Muda of Perak) (died: 12 May 1983)
- Raja Haji Ahmad Shaiffuddin Ibni Almarhum Sultan Haji sir alang Iskandar Shah ii Kaddasullah - (Raja Muda of Perak) (died: 12 April 1987)
- Raja Haji Sir Alang Iskandar Shah i ibni Almarhum Raja Kecil Tengah of Perak Haji Ahmad (Raja Bendahara of Perak) (died; 1852)
- Raja Haji Ahmad Hisham Ibni Almarhum Raja Abdul Malek Abdullah Muhammad Shah II Habibullah - (Raja Di-Hilir of Perak) (died: 21 September 1997)
- Raja Ashman Shah Ibni Almarhum Sultan Azlan Muhibbuddin Shah Al-Maghfullah - (Raja Kecil Sulong of Perak) (died: 30 March 2012)
- Raja Shahruzzaman Ibni Almarhum Sultan Idris al-Mutawakkil Alallahi Shah II Afifullah (died: 10 October 2014)
- Raja Izuddin Chulan ibni Almarhum Raja Zainal Azman Shah - (Raja Kecil Bongsu of Perak) (died: 28 March 2022)

== Non Royal Families ==
- Tun Mohd Suffian Hashim - Lord President of Supreme Court of Malaysia (died: 2000)
- Mohammad Amin Bin Alang Duakap @ Abdul Wakaf - Orang Kaya-Kaya Laksamana Raja Mahkota of Perak (Died and buried in Singapore (1908). Relocated from Singapore (2006))
- Tan Sri Datuk Seri Haji Chik Mohamad Yusuf bin Sheikh Abdul Rahman - Orang Kaya Bendahara Seri Maharaja of Perak 1 (1958–1975) (died: 1975)
- Tan Sri Dato' Osman Bin Talib - Orang Kaya Bendahara Seri Maharaja of Perak 2 (1975–1984) and Former Chief Minister of Melaka. (died: 1984)
- Dato' Seri Wan Abdul Halim Bin Wan Abdul Jalil - Orang Kaya Temenggong Paduka Raja of Perak (died: 1998)
- Dato' Seri Wan Omar Bin Wan Hamaruddin - Orang Kaya Temenggong Paduka Raja of Perak (died: 1992)
- Dato' Seri Wan Omar Bin Wan Ahmad Rasdi - Orang Kaya Menteri Paduka Tuan of Perak (died: 2003)
- Dato' Seri Wan Ahmad Isa Shukri Bin Wan Ahmad Rasdi - Orang Kaya Menteri Paduka Tuan of Perak (died: 1992)
- haji Osman Bin hajimUda Maamor - Orang Kaya-Kaya Shahbandar Paduka Indera of Perak (died: unknown date)
- Dato' Seri haji Ibrahim Bin haji Abdull Kharrim - Orang Kaya-Kaya Shahbandar Paduka Indera of Perak (died: 1982)
- Dato' Wan haji Mohd Ali Bin Wan haji Omar - Orang Kaya-Kaya Seri Adika Raja Shahbandar Muda of Perak (died: 1954)
- Datuk Setia Bijaya DiRaja Jeragan Abdul Shukor bin Muhammad Ali - Orang Kaya-Kaya Setia Bijaya Diraja of Perak 5 (died: 1924)
- Syed Abdul Hamid Jamalullail bin Syed Shaffi Jamalullail - Orang Kaya Besar Maharaja di Raja of Perak (Orang Besar 4), Orang Besar Jajahan Kerian (died 1949).
- Datuk Setia Mohd Noordin Bin Jeragan Abdul Shukor - Orang Kaya-Kaya Setia Bijaya Diraja of Perak 6 (died: unknown date)
- Dato' Seri Abdul Wahab Bin Mohd Noordin - Orang Kaya-Kaya Setia Bijaya Diraja of Perak (died: 1989)
- Mohd Tahir Bin Jeragan Abdul Shukur - Penghulu Jajahan Daerah Gerik (died: 1946)
- Mohd Hamidi Bin Mohd Tahir - (died: 1994)
- Col (Rtd) Dato' Seri Mohamed Zulkifli Bin Mohamed Kushairi - Orang Kaya-Kaya Shahbandar Paduka Indera of Perak (1983–2009), Orang Besar Jajahan Kerian, Perak.(1993–2009) (died: 2009)
- Datuk Wan Mohammad Khair-il Anuar Wan Ahmad - Kuala Kangsar Member of Parliament (died: 2016)

== See also ==
- Sultan Abdul Samad Mausoleum, Bukit Jugra, Jugra, Kuala Langat, Selangor
- Shah Alam Royal Mausoleum, Shah Alam, Selangor
- Kelantan Royal Mausoleum, Kota Bharu, Kelantan
- Pahang Old Royal Mausoleum, Kampung Marhum, Kuala Pahang, Pekan, Pahang
- Mahmoodiah Royal Mausoleum, Johor Bahru, Johor
- Seri Menanti Royal Mausoleum, Seri Menanti, Kuala Pilah, Negeri Sembilan
