= Elmina Rainbow Bridge =

Pedestrian footbridge in Shah Alam, Selangor, Malaysia

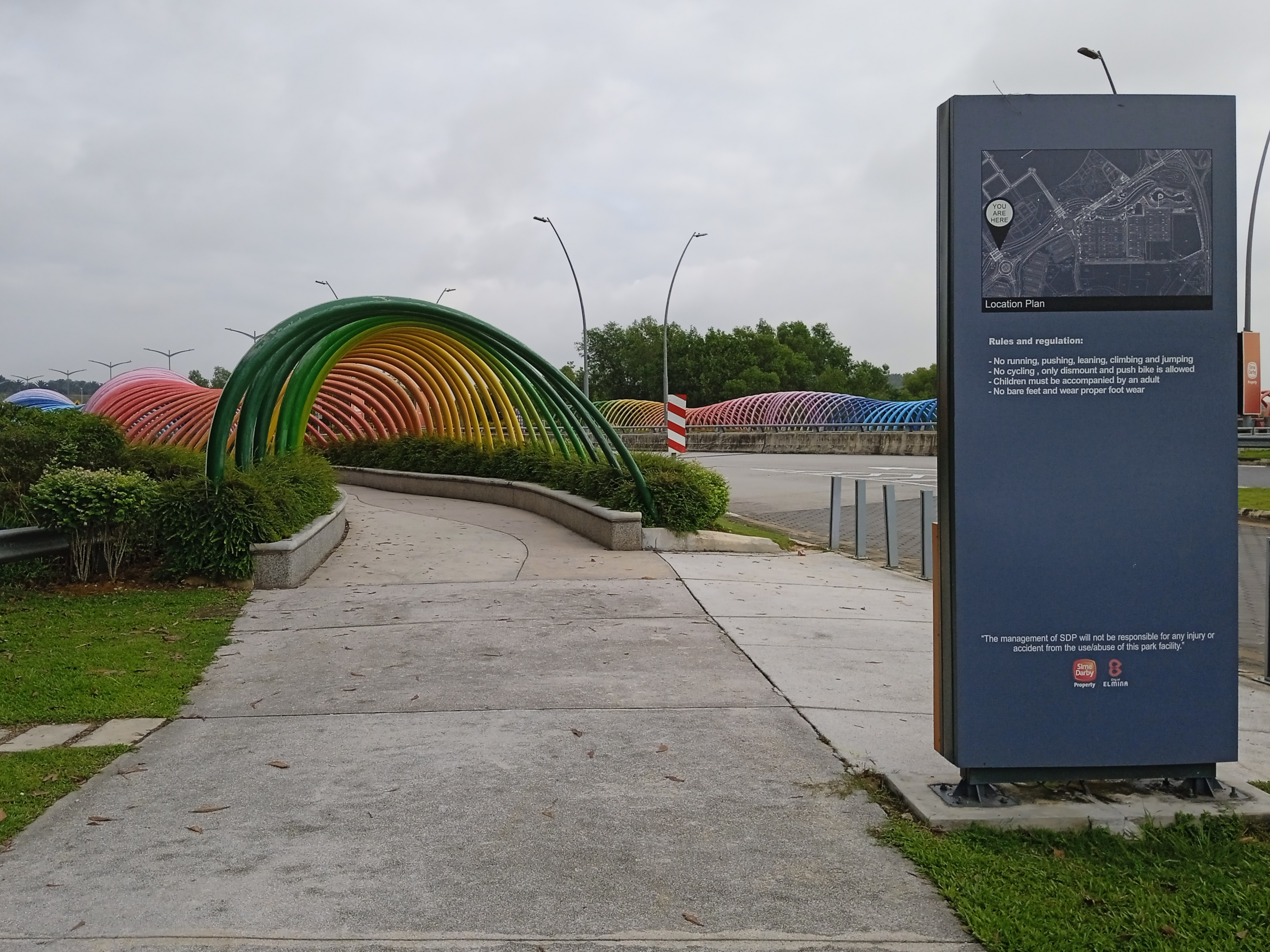
- Elmina Rainbow Bridge
- Coordinates: 3°10′33″N 101°30′18″E
- Carries: Pedestrian
- Locale: City of Elmina, Section U16, Shah Alam, Selangor, Malaysia
- Official name: Jambatan Pelangi Elmina

History
- Opened: 2020

Location
- Interactive map of Elmina Rainbow Bridge

Elmina Rainbow Bridge (Malay: Jambatan Pelangi Elmina) is the rainbow pedestrian bridge in the City of Elmina, Shah Alam, Selangor, Malaysia. It has two bridges along the Persiaran Dillena and is maintained by Sime Darby Property. In addition, the rainbow bridge about one km (0.62 mi) away from the Elmina Central Park, the rainbow colours and unique architecture has attracted countless visitors to take pictures. In addition, the area is surrounded by greenery, and it has also become a picnic spot for picnic. In fact, the rainbow bridge is a sidewalk built on both sides of the road, embellishing the monotonous sidewalk, and playing a finishing touch.

== Gallery ==
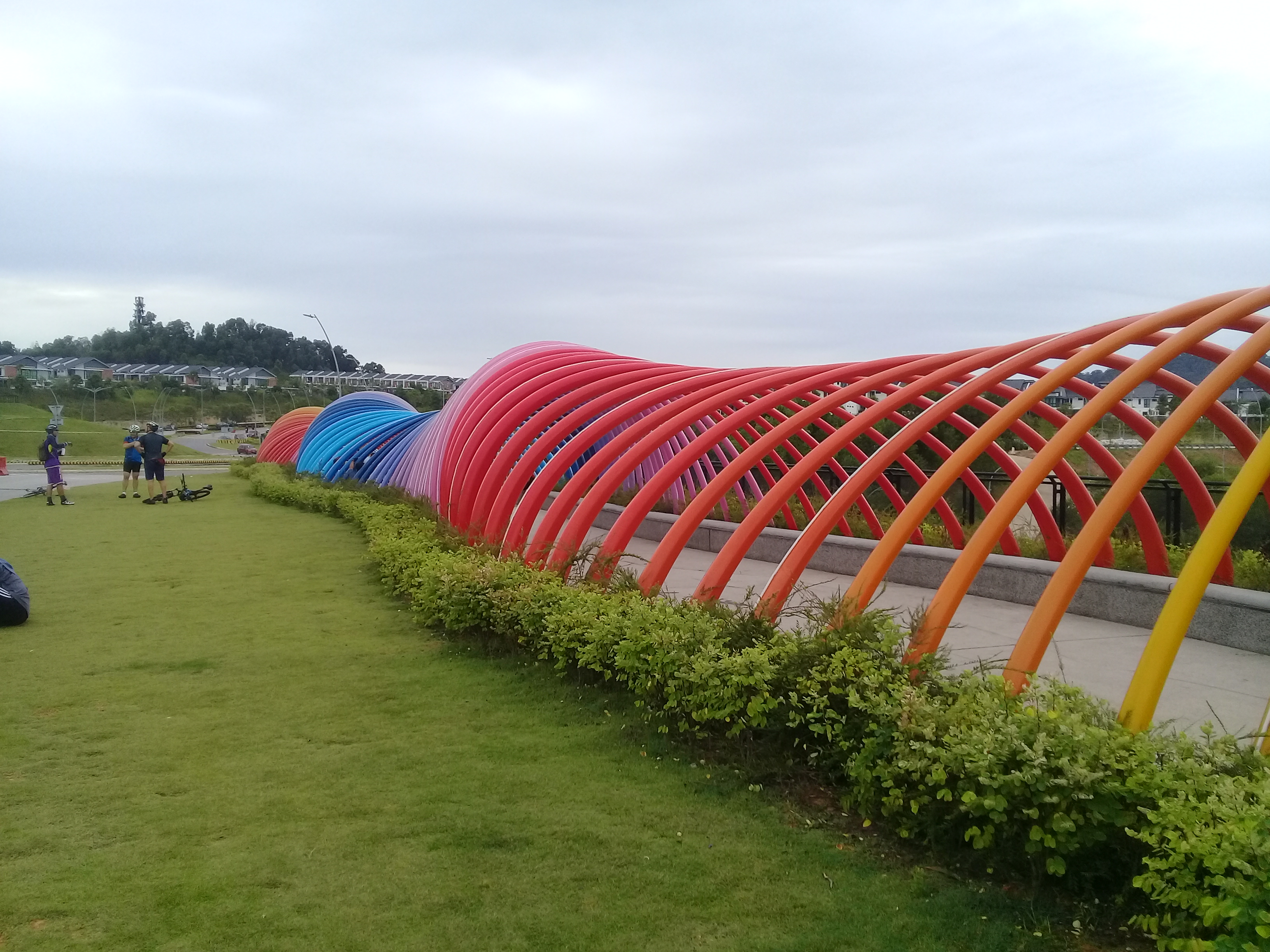

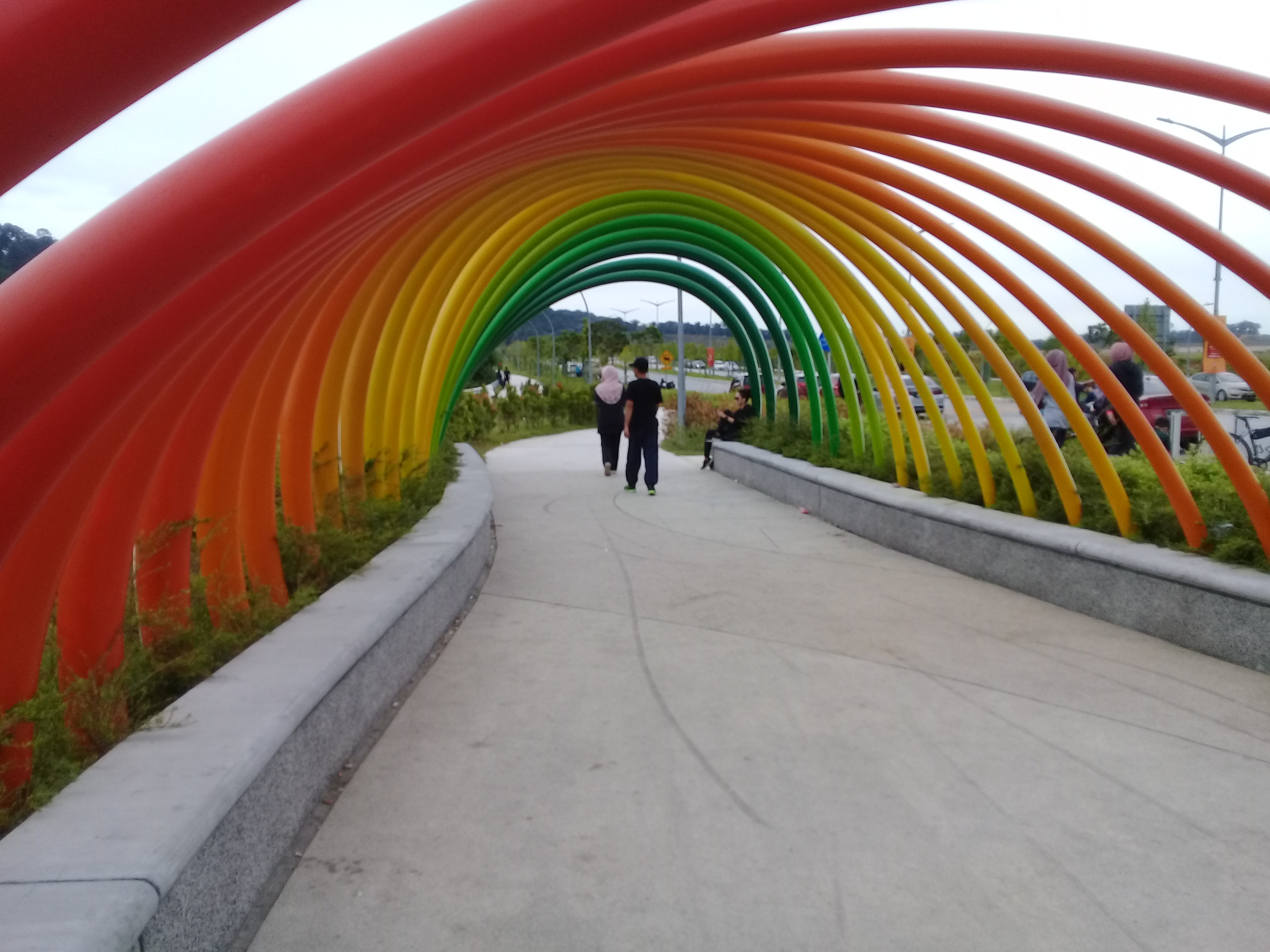

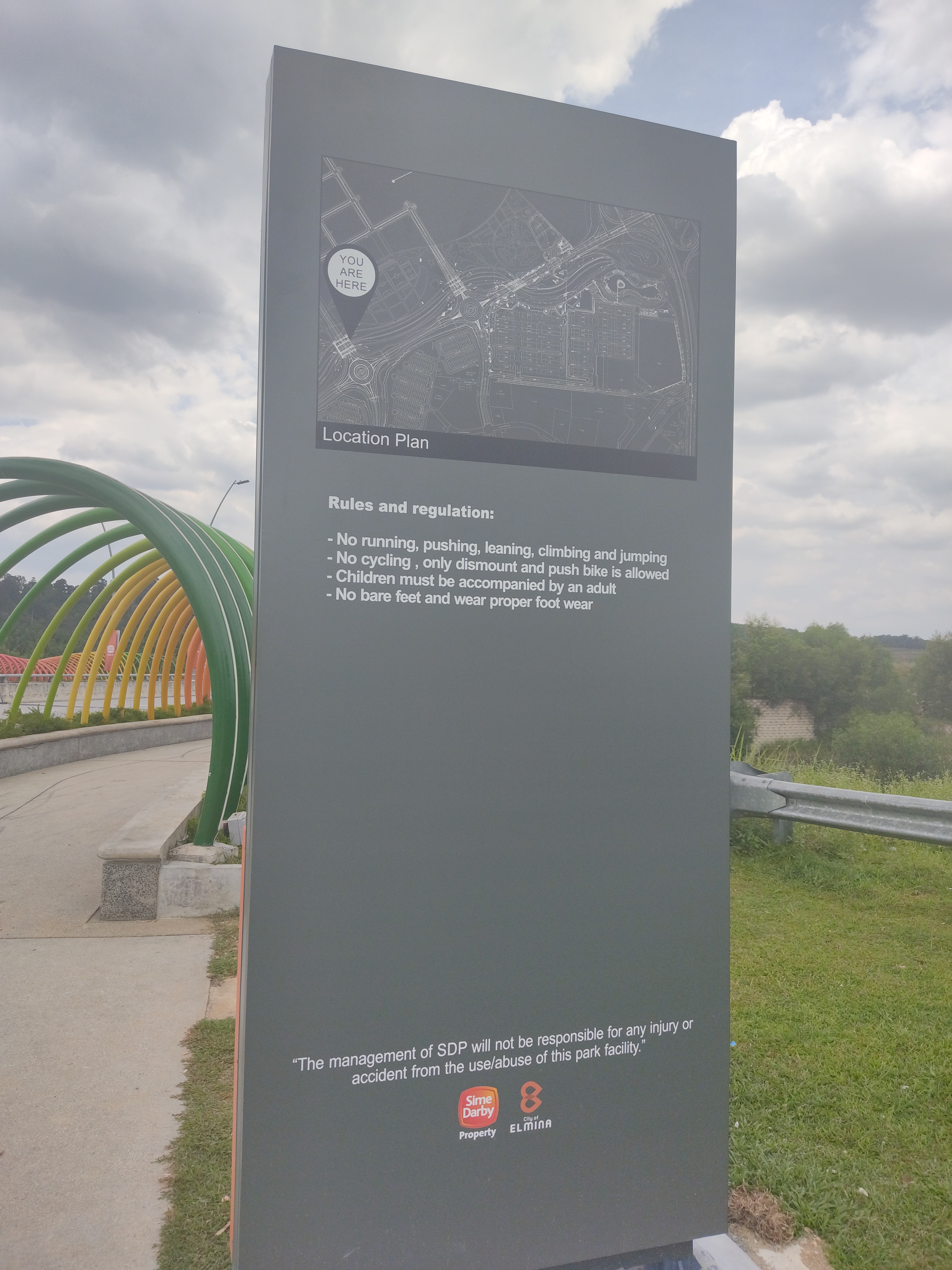

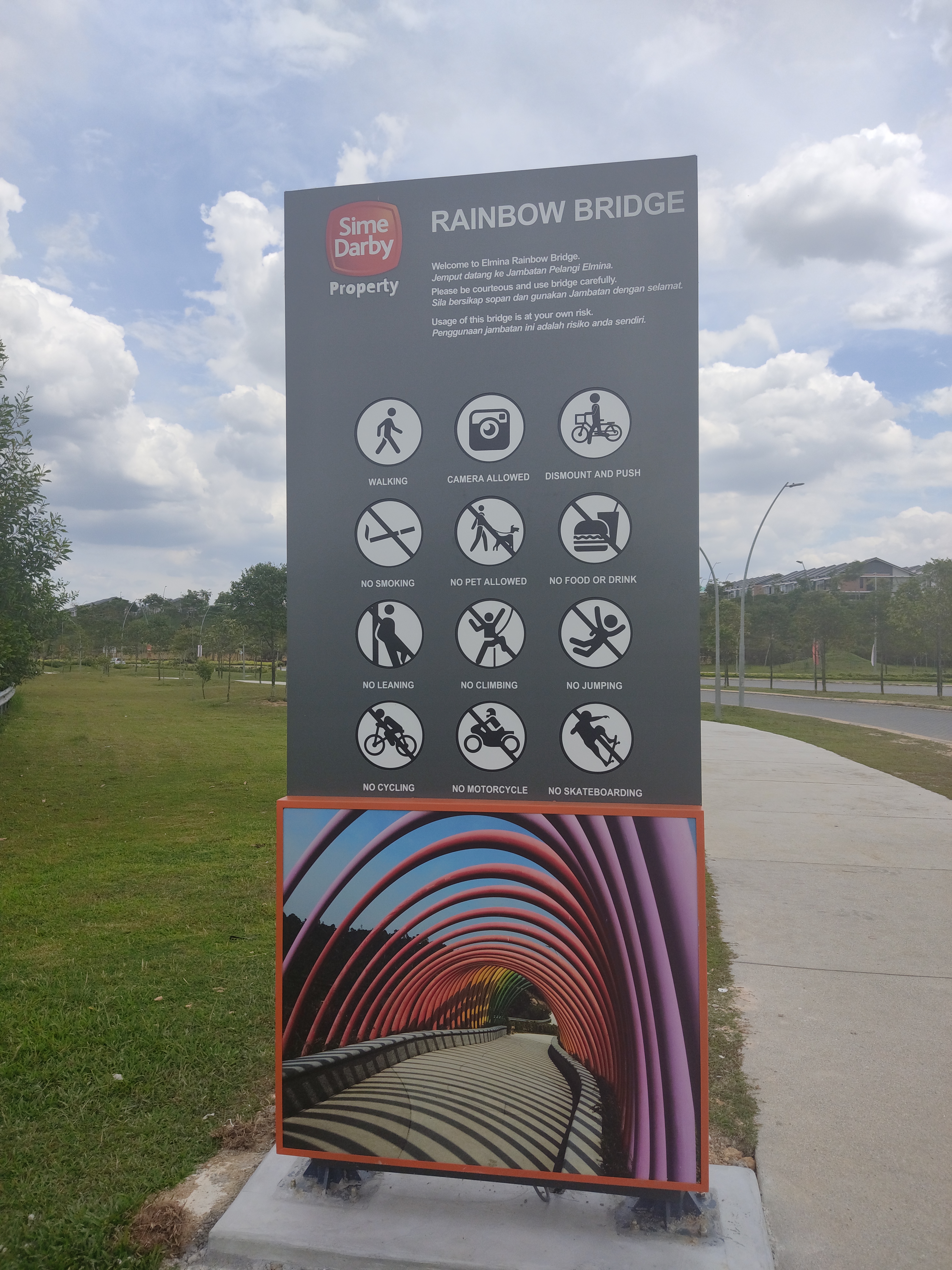

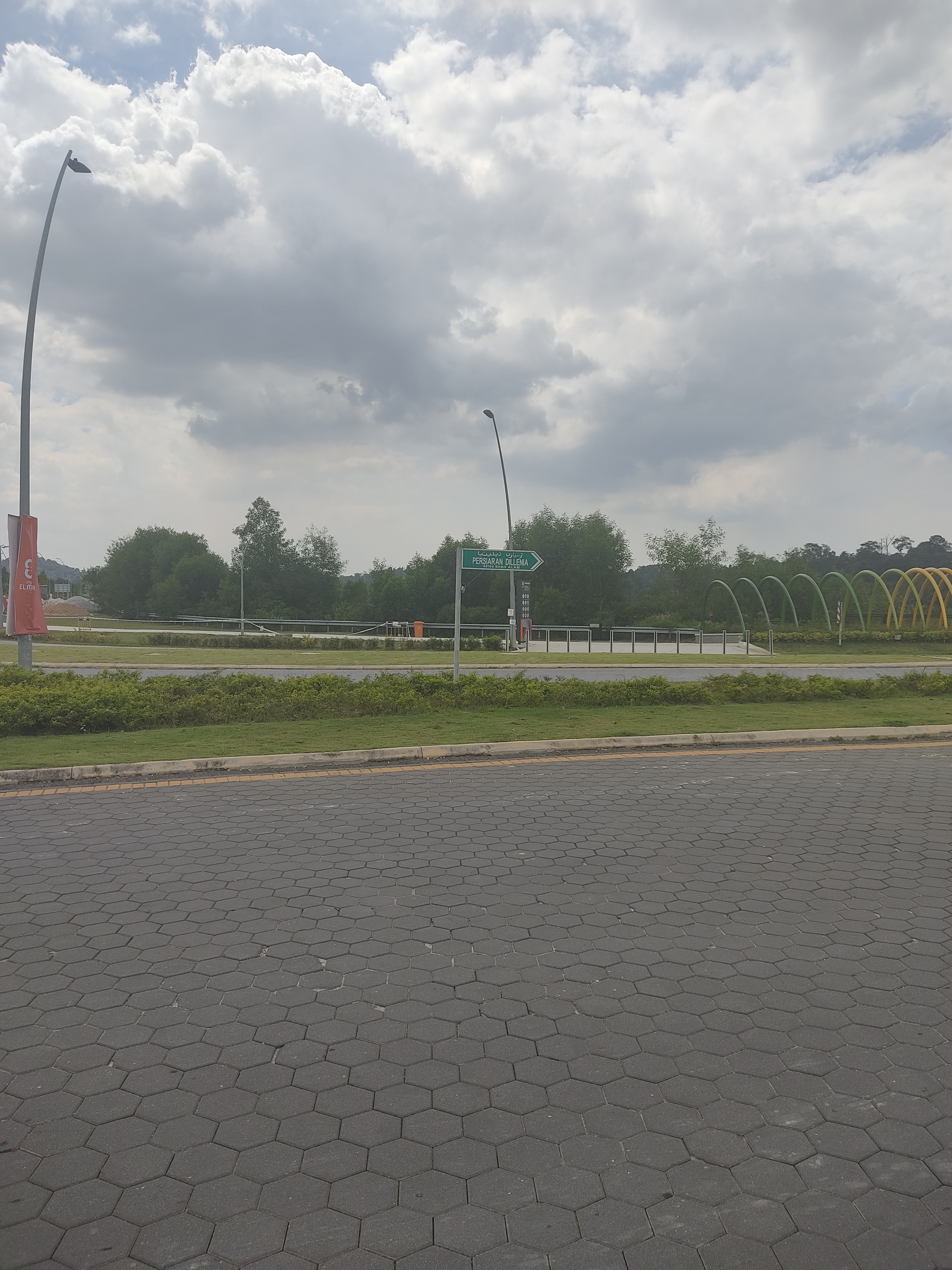

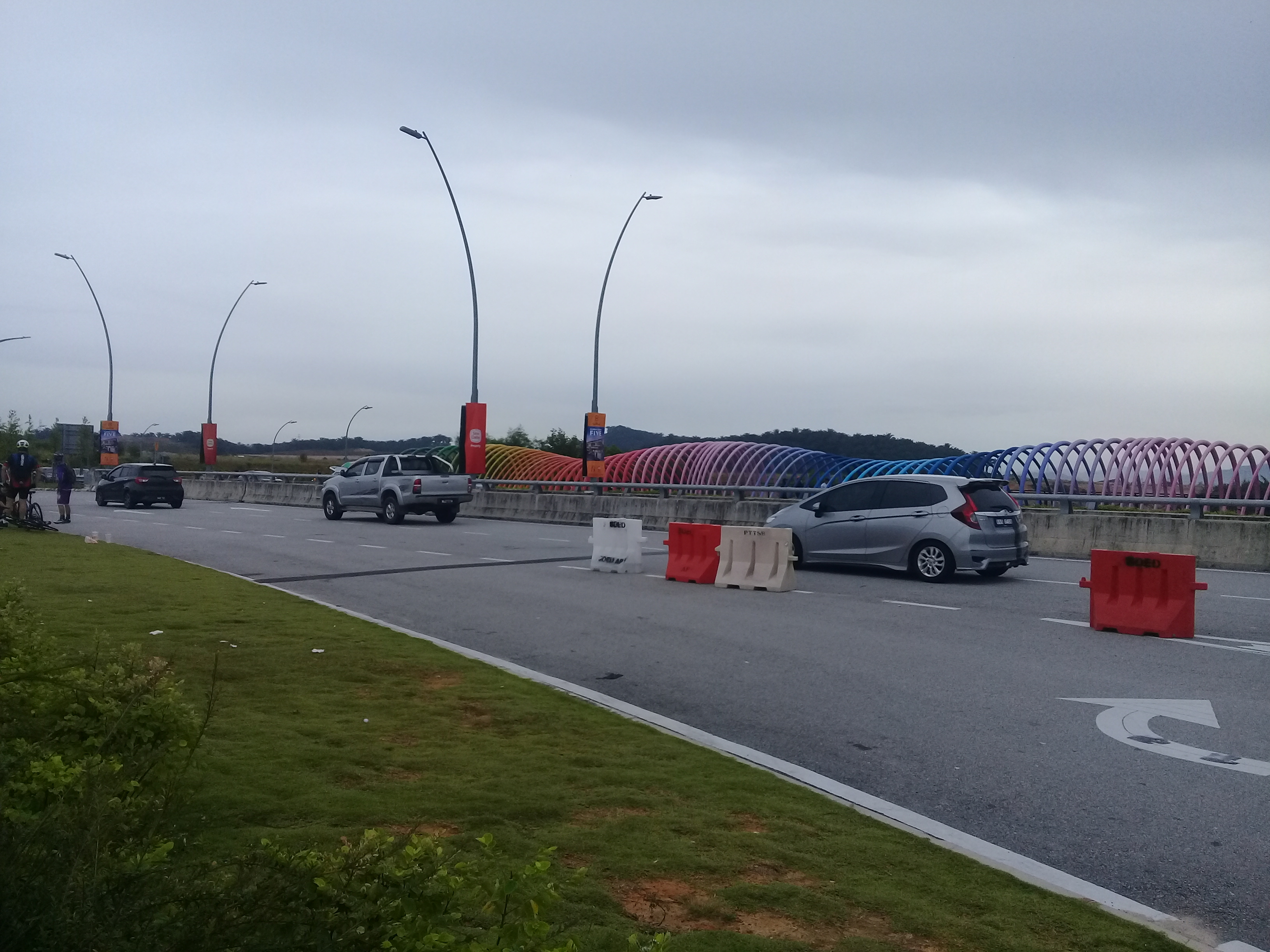

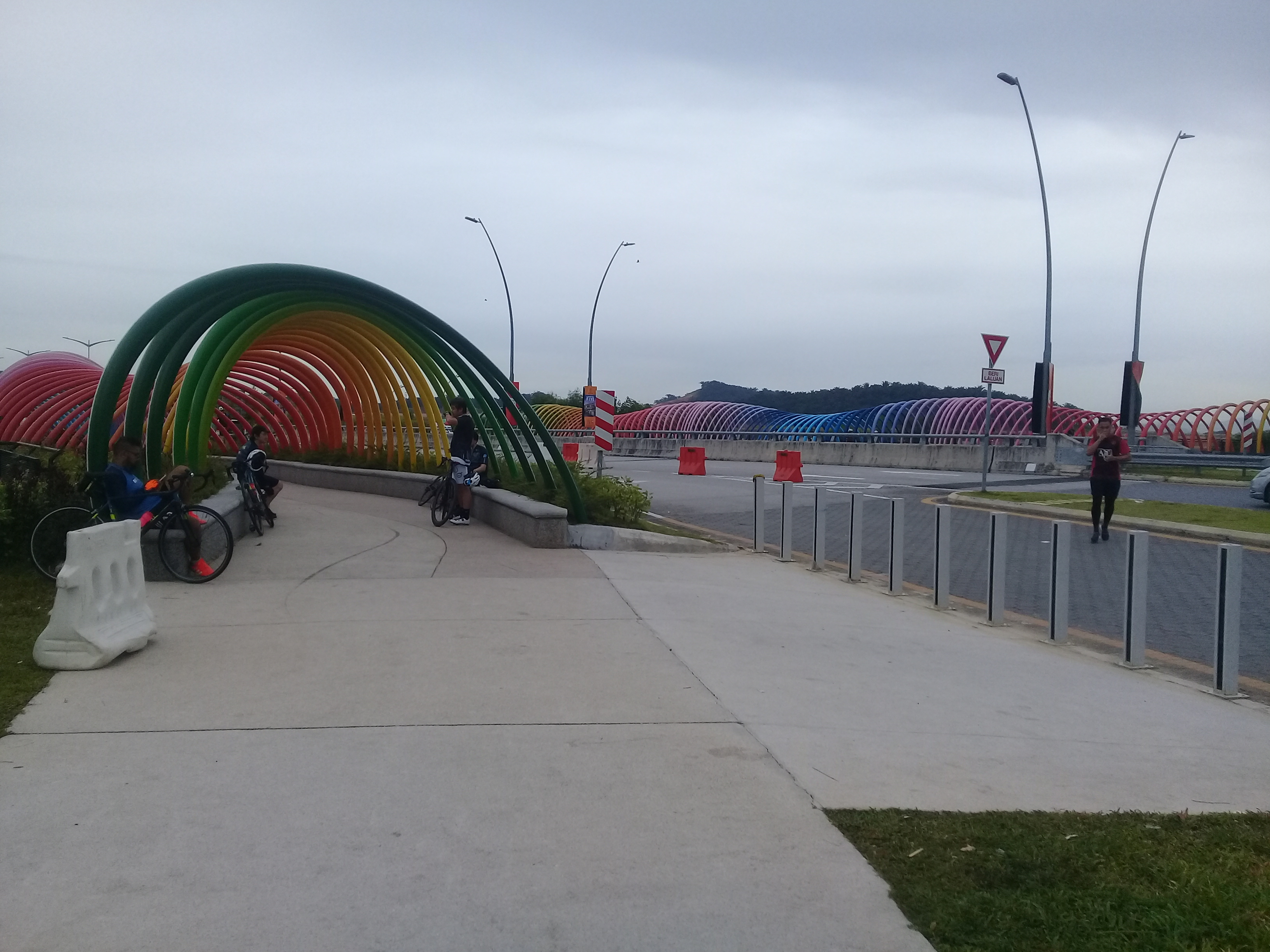

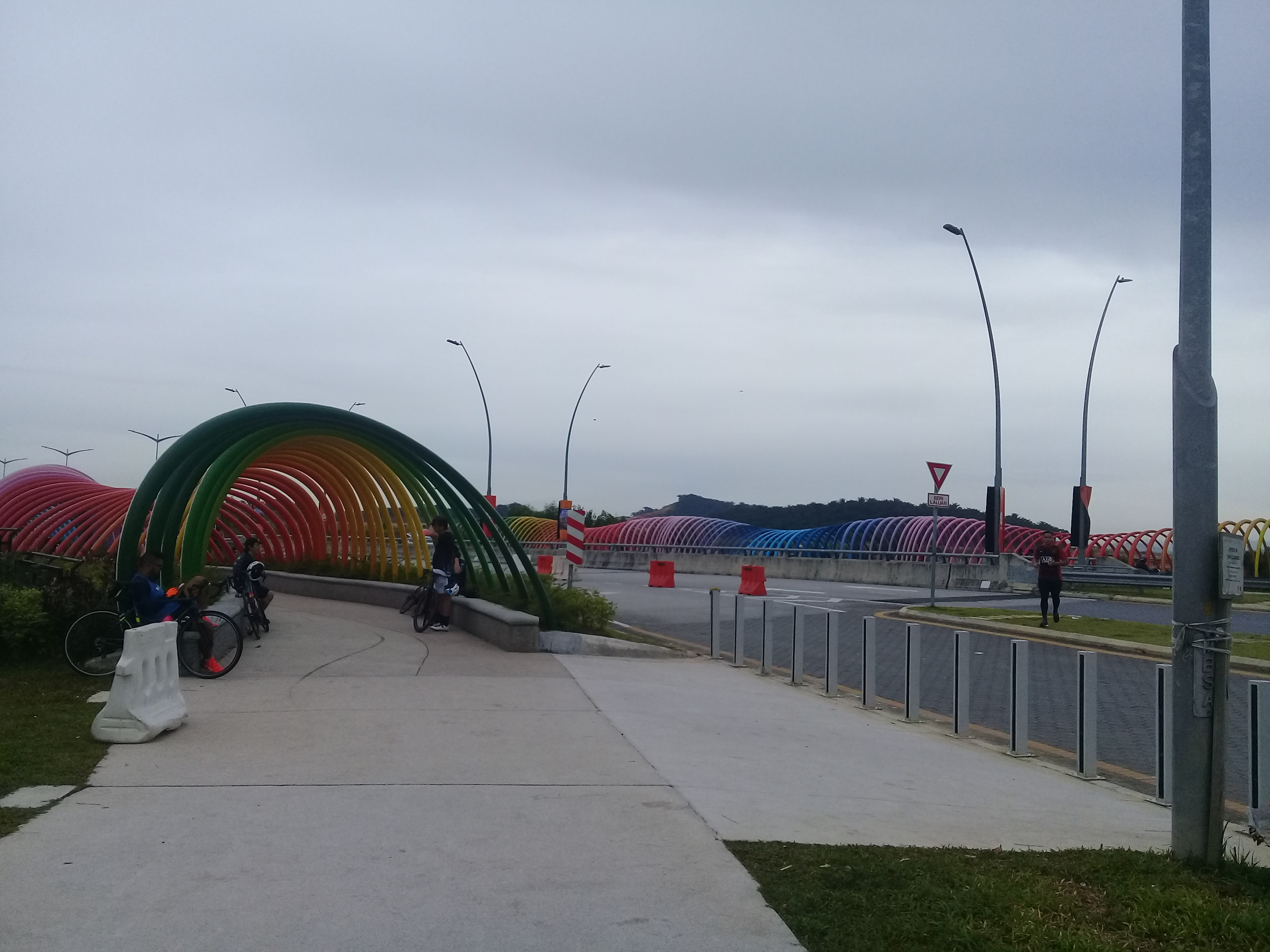

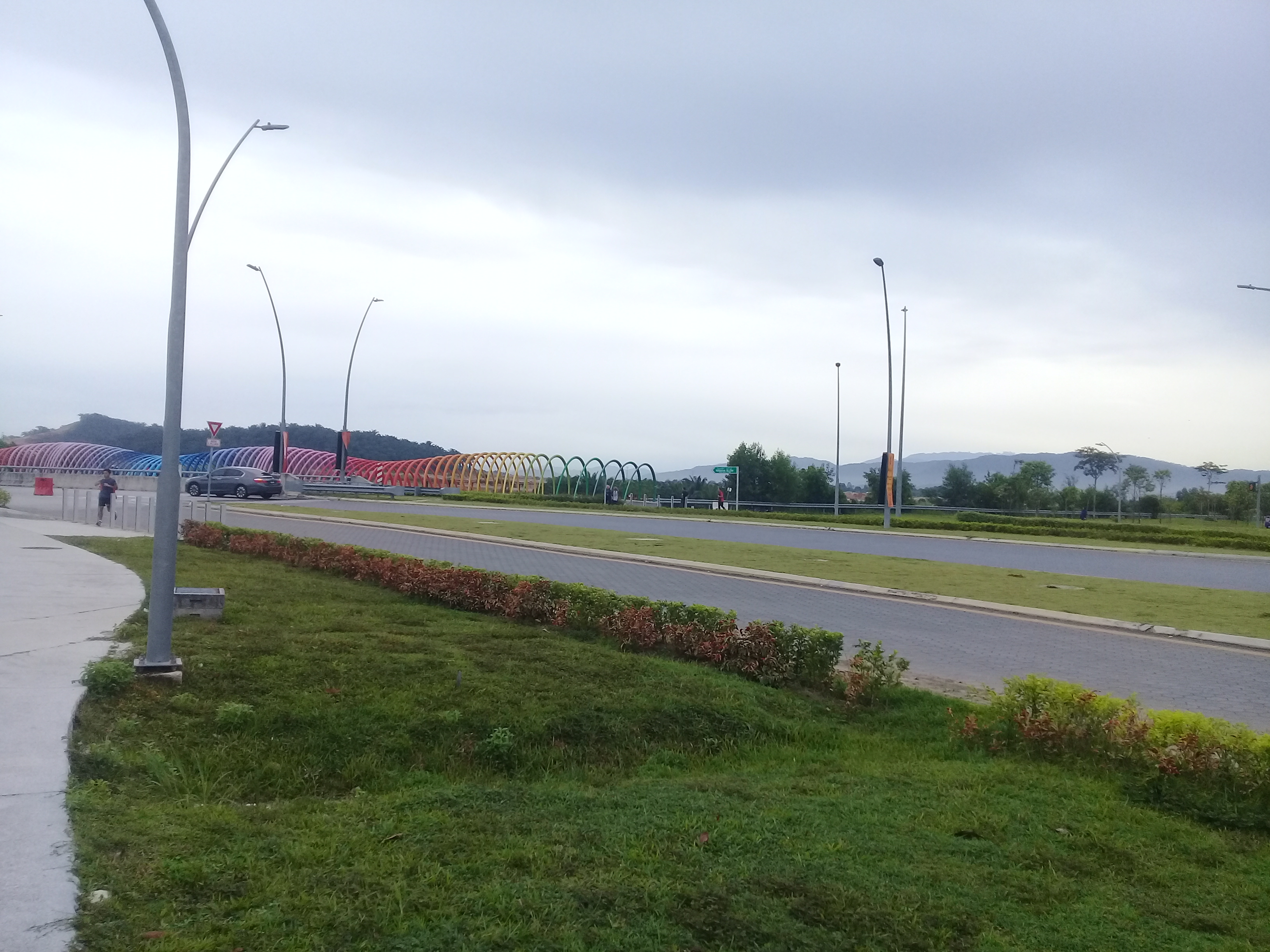

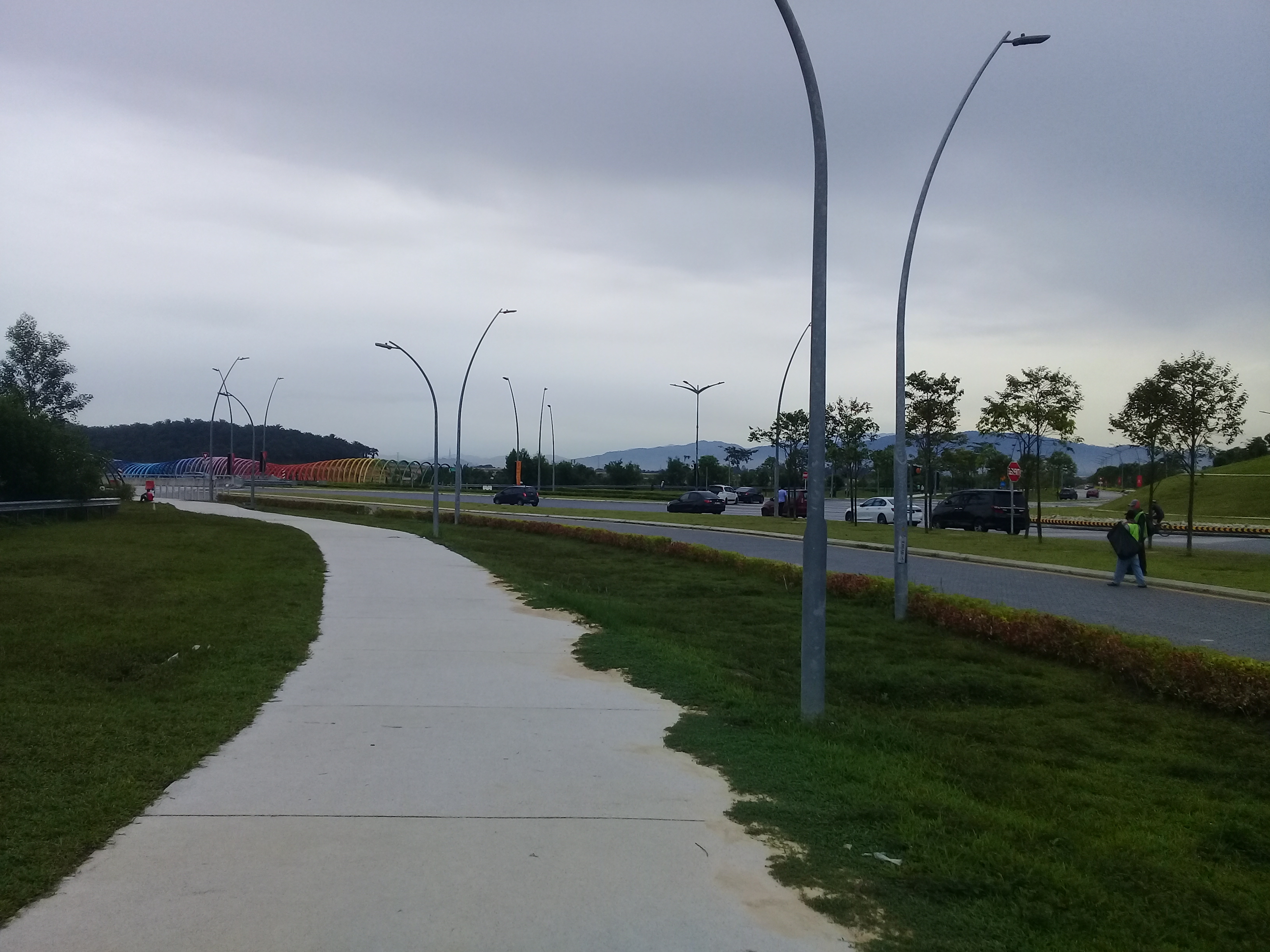

== See also ==
- Saloma Link
