= Abdul Aziz al-Muʽtasim Billah Shah of Perak =

Sultan of Perak (r. 1938–1948)

ʽAbdul ʽAziz عبد العزيز
- Marhum Nikmatullah
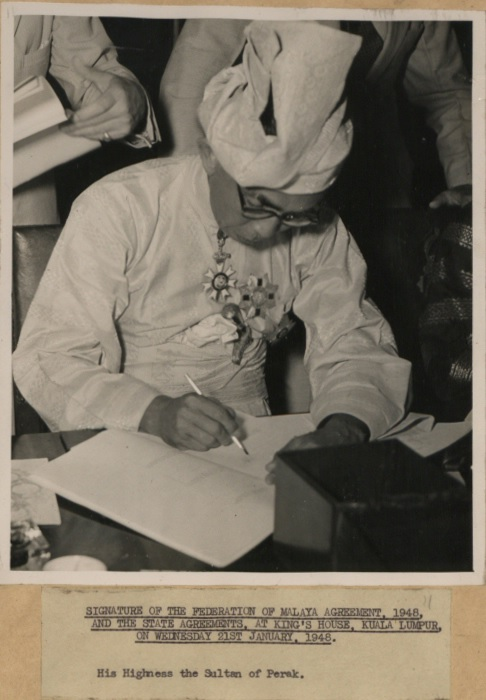
- Signature of the Federation of Malaya Agreement, 1948, and the State Agreements, at King's House, Kuala Lumpur, on Wednesday 21 January 1948. His Highness the Sultan of Perak.

Sultan of Perak
- Reign: 15 October 1938 – 29 March 1948
- Installation: 4 March 1939
- Predecessor: Iskandar of Perak
- Successor: Yussuf Izzuddin Shah of Perak
- Born: 14 November 1887; Kampung Bandar, Teluk Anson, Perak, British Malaya
- Died: 29 March 1948 (aged 60); Rest House Lumut, Perak, Malaya
- Burial: 31 March 1948; Al-Ghufran Royal Mausoleum, Kuala Kangsar, Perak, Malaya
- Spouse: Raja Khadijah Binti Sultan Idris Murshidul ʽAzzam Shah Rahmatullah
- Issue: Raja Muda Musa (Raja Muda of Perak)
Names
- Sultan ʽAbdul ʽAziz al-Muʽtasim Billah Shah ibni Almarhum Raja Muda Musa
- House: Siak-Perak
- Father: Raja Muda Musa Ibni Almarhum Sultan Ja’afar Safiuddin Mu’azzam Shah Waliullah
- Mother: Cik Amina Binti Sheikh Muhammad Taib
- Religion: Sunni Islam

Sultan ʽAbdul ʽAziz al-Muʽtasim Billah Shah ibni Almarhum Raja Muda Musa KCMG KBE (Jawi: سلطان عبد العزيز المعتصم بالله شاه ابن المرحوم راجا مودا موسى; 14 November 1887 – 29 March 1948) was the 31st sultan of Perak, a state in the British-administered Federated Malay States.

== Early life ==
Raja Abdul Aziz was born on 14 November 1887 at Kampung Bandar, Teluk Anson, Perak. He was the son of Raja Muda Musa ibni Almarhum Sultan Ja’afar Safiuddin Mu’azzam Shah Waliullah.

In 1908 after graduating from the Malay college, he joined the administrative services as a Malay probationer at the Peral secretariat and in 1910, he served as an acting settlement officer for Krian. In 1911, he was appointed as acting Magistrate in Lenggong and in the same year he was also appointment as acting district officer for Matang and acting district officer for Larut on 1 March 1912. In 1914, he was appointed acting padi inspector for Krian and was appointed as Magistrate of Lenggong. Before becoming Raja Muda, he served in Upper Perak and in Larut and Matang as a assistant district officer.

== Sultan of Perak ==
On 25 November 1918, he was appointed Raja Bendahara by the sultan. On 23 January 1919, he was appointed raja muda (crown prince). He became the Raja Muda of Perak in 1919 during the reign of his brother-in-law, Sultan Iskandar Shah. He became the 31st Sultan of Perak on 15 October 1938, succeeding Sultan Iskandar.

== Death ==
In 1948, he began to show poor health and was advised by his doctors to go to Lumut for a change of air. However, he died suddenly at the Lumut Rest House at 11:30am on 29 March 1948 at the age of 60. He was interred at the Al-Ghufran Royal Mausoleum in Bukit Chandan next to his first wife and the posthumous title Marhum Nikmatullah was conferred upon him. Perak went into 100 days of mourning for the late sultan. He was succeeded by his cousin, Raja Yussuf Izzuddin Shah, then Raja Muda of Perak.

== Honours ==
=== British honours ===
- Honorary Companion of the Most Distinguished Order of Saint Michael and Saint George (1924 Birthday Honours).
- Knight Grand Cordon of the Order of the Crown of Thailand (20 October 1924).
- King George V Silver Jubilee Medal (6 May 1935).
- Knight Commander of the Most Excellent Order of the British Empire (3 May 1937).
- King George VI Coronation Medal (12 May 1937)
- Knight Commander of the Most Distinguished Order of Saint Michael and Saint George (1 January 1939).

== Ancestry ==
Ancestry of Abdul Aziz of Perak

16. Sultan Abdul Malik ibni Sultan Ahmaddin of Perak
8. Raja Kechil Tengah Ahmad of Perak
17. Raja Hitam binti Raja Inu Tengah of Perak
4. Sultan Jaafar of Perak
18. Daeng Masiah of Lingga
9. Che' Puan Busu Long
19. Raja Galuh
2. Raja Muda Musa I of Perak
5. Che' Alang Amas
1. Sultan Abdul Aziz of Perak
6. Shaikh Muhammad Taib of Minangkabau
3. Cik Amina
7. ??

Regnal titles
Preceded by Sultan Iskandar Shah Ibni Almarhum Sultan Idris Mushidul Azzam Shah Rahmatullah	Sultan of Perak; 1938–1948	Succeeded by Sultan Yussuf Izzuddin Shah Ibni Almarhum Sultan Abdul Jalil Karamatullah Nasiruddin Mukhtaram Shah Radziallah
