= Murder of Zayn Rayyan =

Murder of a child in Malaysia

- Location: Near Idaman Apartment, Damansara Damai, Damansara, Selangor, Malaysia
- Date: December 5, 2023; 6:36 pm
- Attack type: Child murder
- Deaths: 1
- Victim: 1
- Motive: Under investigation
- Accused: 2
- Charges: Murder

On December 5, 2023, a six-year-old child, Zayn Rayyan bin Abdul Matiin, went missing in the Damansara suburb area, located in Selangor, Malaysia. Through a search party, the child was found dead in a nearby riverbank, and later confirmed by local police to have been murdered.

== Background ==
Zayn Rayyan bin Abdul Matiin, a six-year-old child with autism, was reported missing at 6:36 pm on December 5, 2023, and was last seen playing in school uniform in the Damansara Damai area, Selangor, Malaysia. Subsequently, broadcasts were made by his family and spread throughout the media.

On the evening of December 6, local police collaborated with hundreds of apartment residents in the search and rescue efforts for Zayn, including door-to-door searches in the surrounding areas. Zayn was later found dead near a riverbank in the nearby bushes on that night by the residents. He was found 200 meters from where he was last seen by his mother.

=== Investigation ===
Forensic investigations later confirmed that he was murdered, believed to have been strangled based on neck injuries, and confirmed that he had injuries consistent with self-defense. Additionally, no signs of abuse were detected on his body. Following this discovery, the police established a special task force to investigate the murder. Zayn's body was then buried on December 7 after the post-mortem examination.

The area where the body was found was reportedly searched several times by search parties before. Therefore, police speculated that he was murdered elsewhere and then brought to the discovery site. Subsequent investigations later continued in the surrounding area to find new evidence. Initial investigations suggested that only one suspect was involved.

On May 31, 2024, at 10:05 am, Zayn's parents were confirmed to be arrested in Puncak Alam, and has been remanded until June 7 to assist the ongoing investigation.

On June 3, 2024, at 1:58 pm, three individuals, including the former babysitter of Zayn Rayyan, was called to the Petaling Jaya police headquarters to help with the investigation.
