= Capital A =

Malaysian investment holding company

Capital A Berhad
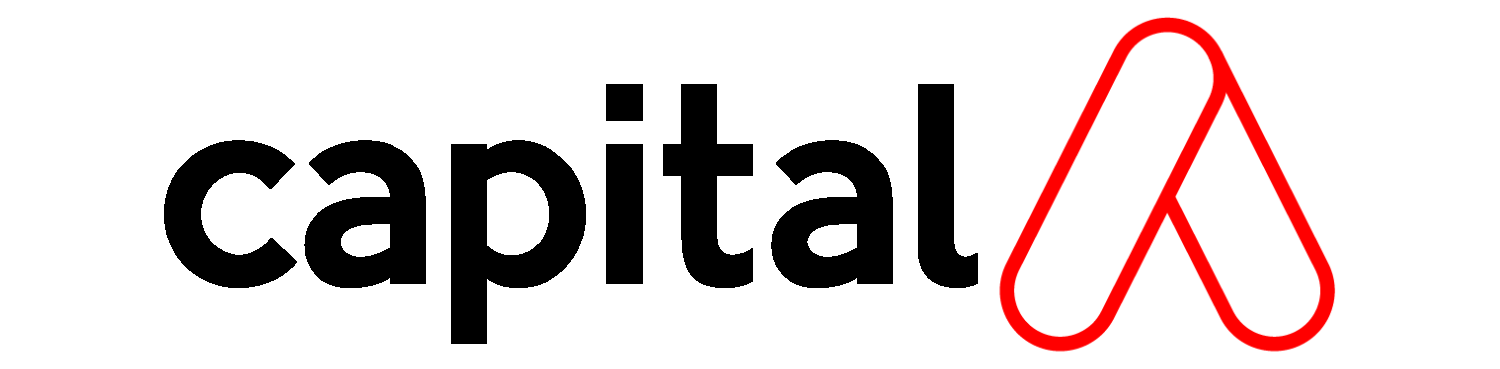
- Trade name: Capital A
- Formerly: AirAsia Group Berhad
- Type: Public limited company
- Traded as: MYX: 5099
- ISIN: MYL5099OO006
- Industry: Aviation Services; Digital; Finance
- Key people: Tony Fernandes, CEO; Kamarudin Meranun, Chairman
- Subsidiaries: AirAsia Brand Co; Asia Digital Engineering Sdn Bhd; Capital Aviation Services Sdn Bhd; MOVE Digital Sdn Bhd; Redbeat Capital Sdn Bhd; Teleport Everywhere Pte Ltd
- Website: capitala.com

Capital A Berhad (doing business as Capital A) is a Malaysian investment holding company headquartered in Kuala Lumpur, Malaysia. The company is involved in the aviation, logistics, fintech and food and beverage industries.

Capital A Berhad (formerly AirAsia Group Berhad) completed the disposal of its airline businesses to AirAsia in January 2026, pivoting to focus on aviation services, digital tech, and logistics.

In January 2026, Capital A completed a major corporate restructuring. It sold its core airline assets to AirAsia X Berhad to consolidate aviation operations and eliminate debt.

== Aviation divestment ==
The company transferred AirAsia Berhad and AirAsia Aviation Group Limited (subsidiaries in Thailand, Indonesia, the Philippines, and Cambodia) to AirAsia X Berhad which was subsequently renamed to AirAsia Group Berhad.
