= Elmina, Malaysia =

Elmina
- Township
- City of Elmina
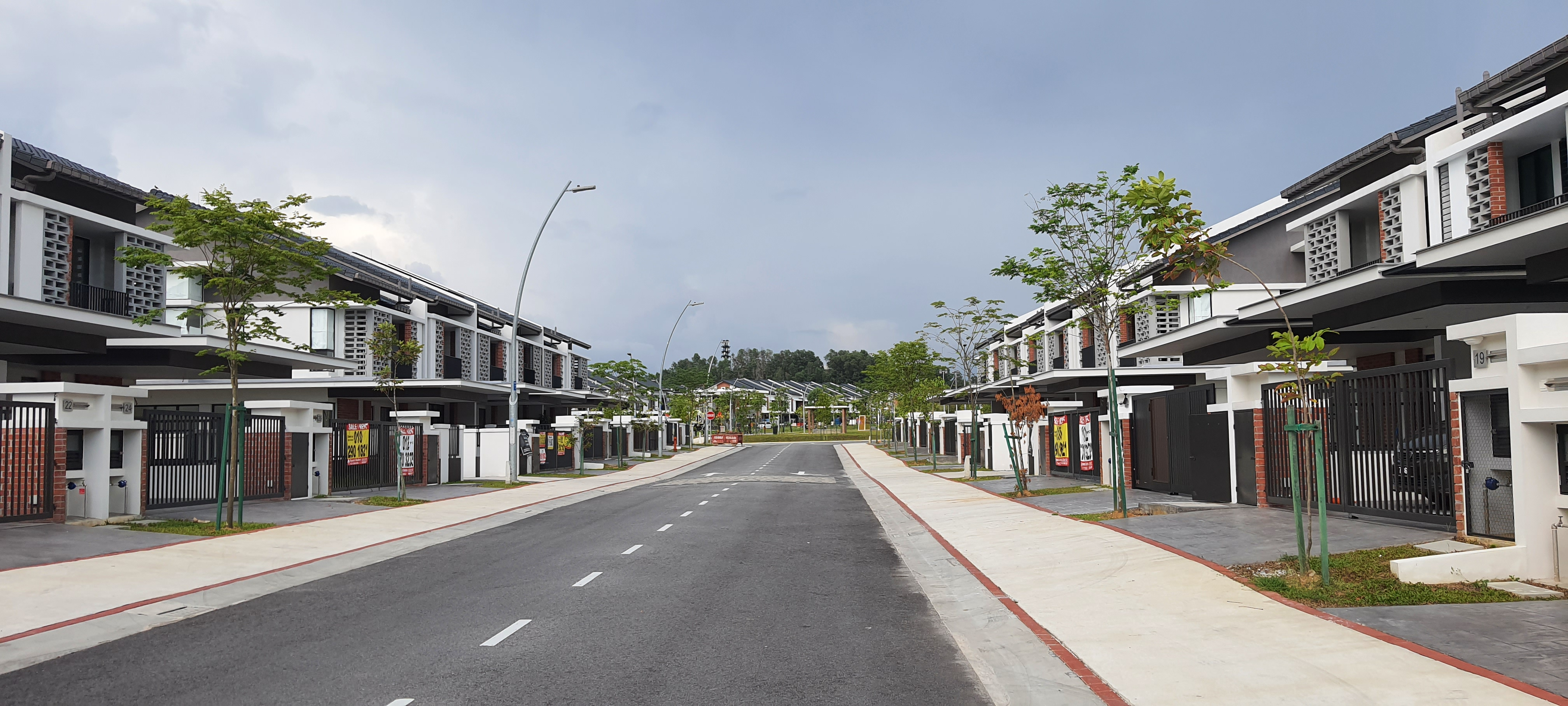
- A newly completed residential area in Bandar Elmina, Selangor. Taken in June 2022

- Location within Selangor Location within Peninsular Malaysia Location within Malaysia
- Coordinates: 3°11′57″N 101°30′02″E
- Country: Malaysia
- State: Selangor
- District: Petaling
- Time zone: UTC+8 (MYT)
- Postal code: 47000

City of Elmina is a township in Sungai Buloh, Selangor, Malaysia. Formerly known as Elmina Estate owned by Guthrie Berhad (now Sime Darby), it is later turned into a township which is developed by Sime Darby Properties.

== Central Park ==
The 300 acres (120 ha) Elmina Central Park forms a central green spine and 5-kilometre urban biodiversity corridor that enables wildlife to co-exist alongside urban population.

The river within this Central Park is not designed just for recreation but is also capable of mitigating up to a Q1000 flood event. There are 6 distinct parks that makes up this entire central park.

== Parks ==
Forest Park – provides 84 acres (34 ha) of parklands, which is adjacent to the 2,700 acres (1,100 ha) Subang Forest Reserve.

Arts & Cultural Park – provides 37 acres (15 ha) of space where the community can celebrate festivities and organise activities.

Urban Park – provides 35 acres (14 ha) of shopping offerings that consist of the Elmina Lakeside Mall and an adjacent greenery area.

Wildlife Park – spread across 25 acres (10 ha), wildlife park that allow visitors to discover nature up close via the Bird Watch Towers, Canopy Walk, Iconic Gateway, Viewing Deck and Origami Pavilion

Community Park – community park provides the setting for residents of all ages to come together.

Sports Park – a 108 acre space that provides varies sports venues.

== Incidents ==
=== 2023 plane crash ===
On 17 August 2023, a Beechcraft Model 390 Premier I registered N28JV belonging to ValetJet crashed on a highway near the town. The incident killed all 8 onboard as well as a motorcyclist and a car driver that were near the crash site. The investigation cited as a pilot error.

== Access ==
=== Car ===
Kepong-Kuala Selangor road is the nearest access route. Guthrie toll road runs along the western boundary of the township.

=== Public transportation ===
The closest rail station is Kwasa Sentral MRT station, about 6.7 km east.

== Public amenities ==
=== School ===
- SJK (C) Ladang Regent

== Tourist attractions ==
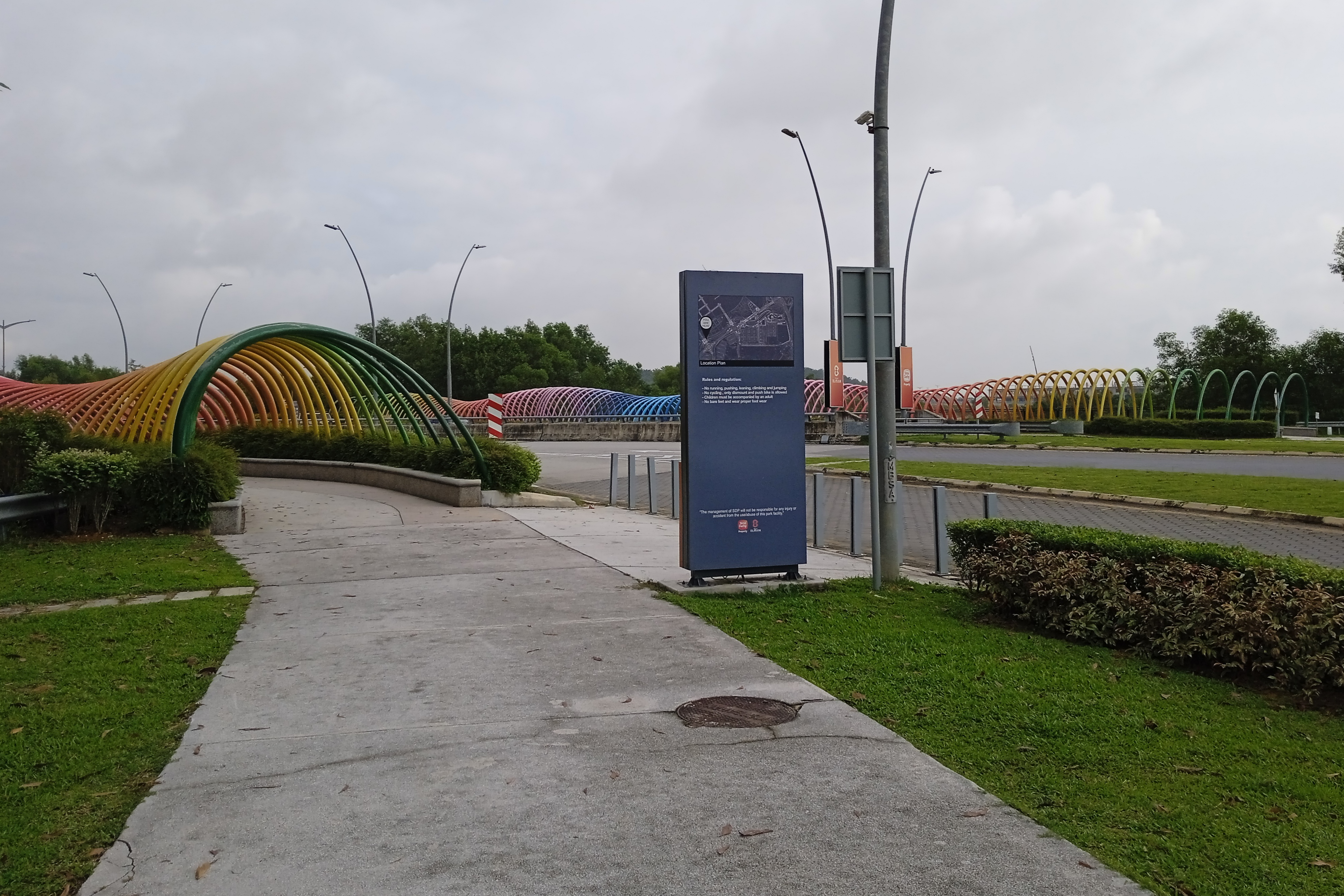
Elmina Rainbow Bridge

- Elmina Rainbow Bridge
- Elmina Central Park
- Elmina Lakeside Mall (was opened on 22 August 2024)
