= Raja Izuddin Chulan =

Royalty of Perak, Malaysia (1951–2022)

Raja Kecil Bongsu of Perak
- Tenure: 27 August 2016 – 28 March 2022
- Born: 14 February 1951; Ipoh, Perak, British Malaya
- Died: 28 March 2022 (aged 71); Ipoh, Perak, Malaysia
- Burial: 29 March 2022; Al-Ghufran Royal Mausoleum, Kuala Kangsar, Perak, Malaysia
- Spouse: Raja Arbi binti Raja Amir Shah
- Issue: Raja Shamir; Raja Zara Dariah; Raja Zana Nadiah; Raja Dara Zaliah; Raja Dana Afzan
Names
- Raja Izuddin Chulan bin Raja Zainal Azman Shah
- House: Perak
- Father: Raja Zainal Azman Shah bin Raja Sir Chulan
- Mother: Che’ Puan Zainab binti Abdul Hamid
- Religion: Sunni Islam

Raja Kechil Bongsu Raja Dato' Seri Izuddin Chulan bin Raja Kechil Tengah Raja Zainal Azman Shah (14 February 1951 – 28 March 2022) was the Raja Kecil Bongsu of Perak making him the sixth in the line of succession to the throne of the Malaysian state of Perak from 27 August 2016 until his death on 28 March 2022.

== Death ==
Raja Izuddin Chulan died of heart disease at the age of 71 at his residence in Bandar Meru Raya on 28 March 2022. He was laid to rest at the Al-Ghufran Royal Mausoleum.

== Honours ==
- Grand Knight of the Order of Cura Si Manja Kini (SPCM) – Dato' Seri (2016)
