= Killing of Muhammad Zaharif Affendi =

Hit and run incident in Malaysia

- Location: Jalan Taman Jati
- Date: 15 December 2023
- Attack type: Hit and run
- Deaths: 1
- Victim: Muhammad Zaharif Affendi Muhd Zamrie
- Motive: Under investigation
- Accused: 1
- Charges: Murder

On December 15, 2023, Muhammad Zaharif Affendi bin Muhd Zamrie, a 17-year-old Malaysian student, was killed when he was struck by a police officer's car in Ipoh, Perak. The incident occurred around noon, as Zaharif was riding his motorcycle from the National Secondary School (SMK) Jati to the mosque for Friday prayers.

== Event ==
Zaharif left National Secondary School (SMK) Jati around noon, and began heading towards his home in Chemor on his motorcycle to prepare for Friday prayers at the mosque.

While on his motorcycle, Zaharif became involved with an altercation with a Kedah police officer due to the noise he was making. The officer followed Zaharif for nearly a kilometer before his car hit the teenager from behind. Zaharif was knocked off his motorcycle and dragged about five meters. The officer left the scene shortly afterward, when he "realised the heavy presence of the public". The officer did not sustain any injuries from the crash.

Zaharif's sister, who worked as a nurse and arrived at the scene shortly after he was hit, said that the officer "was not panicking at all". She briefly interacted with her brother before he lost consciousness, and then performed CPR on him until an ambulance arrived. Zaharif was pronounced dead at the scene. The officer's wife approached Zaharif's family members at the scene, apologizing for the event and saying her husband was "short-tempered".

== Aftermath ==
A post-mortem investigation at Raja Permaisuri Bainun Hospital found that Zaharif died from chest and abdomen injuries sustained during the crash. He was buried in Kampung Kepayang Luar Islamic Cemetery on the evening of December 15.

Video and images of Zaharif's death went viral on social media. Family members later requested that users delete video of the event. Posters bearing Zaharif's likeness began to be posted around Ipoh on December 16, calling for justice for the student's death.

Following Zaharif's death, his family demanded an investigation into the event, to determine whether the crash had been intentional. Members of the family asked eye witnesses to come forward and file police reports on their experiences.

The police officer involved in the event was arrested and put on a remand order until December 18. On December 16, Perak police chief Datuk Seri Mohd Yusri Hassan Basri announced the department would expedite their investigation into the event, and assistant Superintendent Yahaya Hassan addressed the media, assuring a thorough investigation. On December 17, the Attorney-General’s Chambers announced that the officer involved would be charged with murder under section 302 of the Penal Code. The 44-year-old police officer was charged on December 18.

A trial date of February 7, 2024 has been set.
