= Corruption in Malaysia =

According to a 2013 public survey by Transparency International, a majority of the surveyed households perceived corruption in Malaysia to be a significant problem. A quarter of the surveyed households consider the government's efforts in the fight against corruption to be ineffective. Corruption in Malaysia generally involves political connections still playing an important role in the outcome of public tenders.

Government contracts are sometimes awarded to well-connected companies, and the policies of awarding huge infrastructure projects to selected Bumiputera companies without open tender continue to exist.

In February 2016, Malaysia made an appearance in Time Magazine with the dubious distinction of being among a list of five countries whose corruption scandals are being highlighted. The magazine zoomed in on the 1Malaysia Development Berhad scandal (1MDB) and Prime Minister Najib Razak's corruption.

On 28 July 2020, Najib was convicted on seven counts of abuse of power, money laundering and criminal breach of trust by a Malaysian High Court in relation to the 1MDB scandal. He was sentenced to 12 years' imprisonment and fined RM210 million.

== Corruption Perceptions Index ==
Transparency International's 2025 Corruption Perceptions Index, which scored 182 countries on a scale from 0 ("highly corrupt") to 100 ("very clean"), gave Malaysia a score of 52. When ranked by score, Malaysia ranked 54th among the 182 countries in the Index, where the country ranked first is perceived to have the most honest public sector. For comparison with regional scores, the best score among those countries of the Asia Pacific region that appeared in the Index (Note: Afghanistan, Australia, Bangladesh, Bhutan, Brunei Darussalam, Cambodia, China, Fiji, Hong Kong, India, Indonesia, Japan, North Korea, South Korea, Laos, Malaysia, Maldives, Mongolia, Myanmar, Nepal, New Zealand, Pakistan, Papua New Guinea, Philippines, Singapore, Solomon Islands, Sri Lanka, Taiwan, Thailand, Timor-Leste, Vanuatu, Vietnam) was 84, the average score was 45 and the worst score was 15. For comparison with worldwide scores, the best score was 89 (ranked 1), the average score was 42, and the worst score was 9 (ranked 181, in a two-way tie).

Malaysia's best showing in the Corruption Perceptions Index since the start of the current scoring system in 2012 was a score of 53 in 2019. Thereafter, Malaysia's score fell each year to a low of 47 in 2022, but Transparency International praised Malaysia and its newly improved 2023 score of 50 in the context of the Association of Southeast Asian Nations (ASEAN), writing, "Across the ASEAN countries, Malaysia (50) remains above the regional average with robust elections alongside an anti-corruption commission that has delivered on high-profile cases over the last decade." Malaysia retained its improved score of 50 in the 2024 Corruption Perceptions Index and rose to a score of 52 in 2025.

Transparency International lists Malaysia's key corruption challenges as:

1. Political and Campaign Financing: Donations (e.g., USD700Million) from both corporations and individuals to political parties and candidates are not limited in Malaysia. Political parties are also not legally required to report on what funds are spent during election campaigns. Due in part to this political landscape, Malaysia's ruling party for over 55 years has funds that are highly disproportionate to those of other parties. This unfairly impacts campaigns in federal and state elections and can disrupt the overall functioning of a democratic political system.
2. “Revolving door”: Individuals regularly switch back and forth between working for both the private and public sectors in Malaysia. Such circumstances – known as the ‘revolving door’ – allow for active government participation in the economy and public-private relations to become elusive. The risk of corruption is high and regulating public-private interactions becomes difficult, also allowing for corruption to take place with impunity. Another factor which highlights the extent of ambiguity between the public sector and private corporate ownership is that Malaysia is also a rare example of a country where political parties are not restricted from possessing corporate enterprises.
3. Access to information: As of April 2013, no federal Freedom of Information Act exists in Malaysia. Although Selangor and Penang are the only Malaysian states out of thirteen to pass freedom of information legislation, the legislation still suffers from limitations. Should a federal freedom of information act be drafted, it would conflict with the Official Secrets Act, in which any document can be officially classified as secret, making it exempt from public access and free from judicial review. Additional laws such as the Printing Presses and Publications Act, the Sedition Act 1948, and the Internal Security Act 1960 also ban the dissemination of official information and offenders can face fines or imprisonment. Malaysia suffers from corporate fraud in the form of intellectual property theft. Counterfeit production of several goods, including IT products, automobile parts, etc., is prevalent.

In 2013, Malaysia was identified in a survey by Ernst and Young as one of the most corrupt countries in the region according to the perceptions of foreign business leaders, along with neighbouring countries and China. The survey asked whether it was likely that each country would take shortcuts to achieve economic targets.

== Types of corruption ==
=== Corruption in Immigration Enforcement ===
Despite periodic actions by the government to crack down on petty corruption in the Immigration Department, bribe-taking and fraudulent issuance of visas have been long-standing problems, particularly among immigration officers at the KLIA and KLIA2 terminals of Kuala Lumpur International Airport. In 2016, the Malaysian Anti-Corruption Commission (MACC) uncovered a scheme in Selangor, in which immigration officers collected passport application fees from travellers and then submitted fraudulent paperwork declaring them disabled, resulting in fee waivers that amounted to over 1 million Malaysian ringgit by the time the scheme was exposed. In a December 2016 statement to the Malaysian press, Deputy Prime Minister Ahmad Zahid Hamidi estimated that over half of the 1500 immigration officers working in the KLIA and KLIA2 terminals had participated in a range of corrupt practices, including fraudulent issuance of visas, tampering with Immigration Department data, and collusion with human-trafficking agents.

== Anti-corruption bodies ==
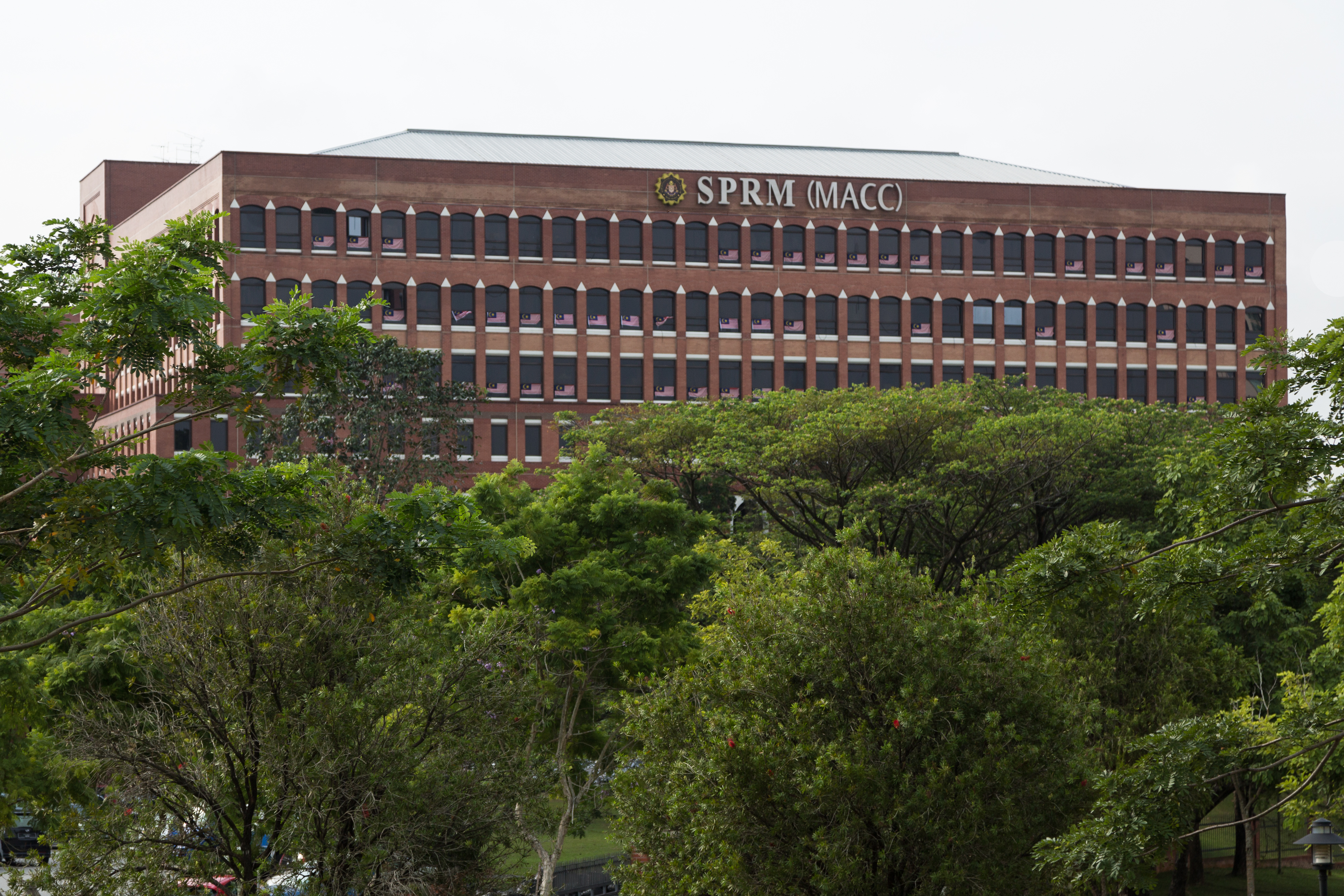
Former Malaysian Anti-Corruption Commission headquarters

The Malaysian Anti-Corruption Commission (MACC) is a government agency in Malaysia that investigates and prosecutes corruption in the public and private sectors. The MACC was modelled after top anti-corruption agencies, such as Hong Kong's Independent Commission Against Corruption and the New South Wales Independent Commission Against Corruption, Australia.

The MACC is currently headed by Chief Commissioner Azam Baki. He was appointed to replace former Chief Commissioner Latheefa Koya, appointed by the Pakatan Harapan (PH) government after the new Perikatan Nasional (PN) government took over in March 2020. Previously, it was headed by Chief Commissioner Datuk Dzulkifli Ahmad. He was appointed on 1 August 2016 to replace former Chief Commissioner Tan Sri Abu Kassim Mohamed. Similarly, the agency is currently under the Prime Minister's Department.

During its term, Pakatan Harapan had appointed a controversial figure, Lateefa Koya, a former member of the ruling coalition party, People's Justice Party, to head the anti-corruption agency. She was appointed shortly after her resignation from the party.

On 3 July 2018, former Prime Minister Najib Razak was arrested by the Malaysian Anti-Corruption Commission (MACC), investigating how allegedly RM42 million (US$10.6 million) went from SRC International, a 1MDB subsidiary, into Najib's bank account. Police seized 1,400 necklaces, 567 handbags, 423 watches, 2,200 rings, 1,600 brooches and 14 tiaras worth $273 million. On 28 July 2020, the High Court convicted Najib on all seven counts of abuse of power, money laundering and criminal breach of trust, becoming the first Prime Minister of Malaysia to be convicted of corruption, and was sentenced to 12 years' imprisonment and fined RM210 million.

== Specific Cases ==
=== Pan-Electric Industries Scandal ===
Pan-Electric Industries was a Singapore-based company that specialised in marine salvage work, and had 71 subsidiary companies, including hotel and property interests, with a market capitalization of S$230 million. The company collapsed in 1985 due to unsettled forward contracts, forcing the stock exchanges of both Singapore and Malaysia to shut down for three days. At its demise, the company had a total debt of S$480 million, and all its shares held by 5,500 shareholders were found to be worthless overnight. As of 2000, it remains the largest corporate collapse in Singapore's history, and the only instance where the Stock Exchange of Singapore (SES) had to close. The Malaysian Kuala Lumpur Stock Exchange was also forced to close for three days as a result.

=== Deposit-taking co-operative scandal ===
In the aftermath of the collapse, key people in the company, such as Peter Tham, Tan Kok Liang, and Tan Koon Swan, were prosecuted and given varying jail sentences. The collapse of the company shook public confidence in the SES, causing prices of stocks to plunge. New securities laws were introduced in March 1986 to ensure that stockbroking firms can protect themselves against credit risks.

The 1986 deposit-taking cooperatives (DTCs) were a scandal waiting to happen.

A year before the scandal erupted, Consumers Association of Penang (CAP) had already written to JPK to find out the control exercised over cooperatives and the protection given to depositors should a cooperative face financial trouble or a “run”. CAP's investigations disclosed that malpractices in the cooperatives included directors using the cooperatives’ funds to buy land which they owned or controlled at above market price. Directors were also making the cooperatives buy the shares they owned in private companies at above market value. The cooperatives also gave big unsecured loans to directors, their relatives or their companies.

On 29 July 1986, CAP sent a memorandum on “The Need for Greater Control over Co-operatives” to Bank Negara Malaysia (BNM), the Ministry of Finance, Jabatan Pembangunan Koperasi (JPK), and the Ministry of National and Rural Development. The memorandum pointed out that unless the Co-operative Societies Act 1948 was amended and cooperative activities strictly regulated, depositors might lose billions.

However, this early warning fell on deaf ears and the scandal exploded.

The DTCs fiasco, which occurred the following month, involved 24 cooperatives, 522,000 depositors and about RM1.5 billion in deposits.

It was triggered off by Koperasi Belia Bersatu Berhad (KOSATU) suspending payments to depositors who wanted to withdraw their savings in July 1986. The Essential (Protection of Depositors) Regulation 1986, promulgated on 20 July 1986, allowed BNM to freeze the assets of KOSATU and its key management and also to investigate into the affairs of the cooperatives. Other depositors became jittery and this led to a run on other DTCs. On 8 August 1986, the activities of 23 other cooperatives were also suspended. Seventeen accounting firms were then appointed to assist BNM in its investigations and to come up with a White Paper.

The White Paper on the DTCs indicated that the 24 DTCs had by November 1986, together lost approximately RM673 million through mismanagement or fraud. The White Paper revealed that a significant number of cooperatives suffered from bad management, either due to a lack of expertise or professionalism or through imprudent, and in some cases, corrupt management.

This results in gross mismanagement of funds, such as overinvestment in land and property, with nearly one-fifth of assets in housing development projects and fixed assets, some of which were purchased at the height of the property market.

There was also over-commitment in loss-making or non-income-generating subsidiaries and related companies, with as much as 42% of total assets committed in loans or capital investments in such companies. The cooperatives also suffered from speculative investments in shares.

In certain cooperatives, incidents of fraudulent activities and conflicts of interest led to imprudent lending of funds, including to directors and other interested parties.

Many cooperatives did not have borrowing powers or exceeded them. A number of them invested in assets or projects without the approval of the JPK, or specifically against the approval of the JPK.

In 1986, five directors of three DTCs were charged in court, and in 1987 a further 17 directors of another five DTCs were also charged.

The refund to the depositors of the 24 DTCs was made possible through three types of rescue schemes. These rescue schemes had provided for a full ringgit-for-ringgit refund by way of cash or a combination of cash and equity.

The rescue involved RM600 million in soft loans and commercial loans from Bank Negara Malaysia. BNM also paid RM15.6 million for professional fees incurred in the investigation and rescue exercise.

In 1988, seven other ailing DTCs were investigated. Three were operating in Sabah and four in Peninsular Malaysia. One of the four in the Peninsula was the Federation of Housing Cooperatives Ltd, in which the Cooperative Central Bank had a 78% interest.

=== 1MDB scandal ===
The 1Malaysia Development Berhad scandal (1MDB scandal) has been described as "one of the world's greatest financial scandals" and declared by the United States Department of Justice as the "largest kleptocracy case to date" in 2016.

In 2015, Malaysia's then-Prime Minister Najib Razak had been accused of channelling over RM 2.67 billion (approximately US$700 million) from 1Malaysia Development Berhad (1MDB), a government-run strategic development company (masterminded by Low Taek Jho), into his personal bank accounts. Dismissal of charges over this triggered widespread outrage among Malaysians, with many calling for Najib Razak's resignation – including Mahathir Mohamad, one of Najib's predecessors, who later defeated Najib in the 2018 general election and returned to power.

Anwar Ibrahim, a political leader in opposition to Najib, openly questioned 1MDB's credentials as early as 2010. He had told Parliament that, according to records held by the Companies Commission, the company "has no business address and no appointed auditor." According to its publicly filed accounts, 1MDB had nearly RM 42 billion (US$11.73 billion) in debt by 2015. Some of this debt resulted from a $3 billion state-guaranteed 2013 bond issue led by the American investment bank Goldman Sachs, which had been reported to have received fees of up to $300 million for the deal, although the bank disputes this figure. Nevertheless, Goldman Sachs was charged in a Foreign Bribery Case and agreed to pay over $2.9 billion in a settlement with the U.S. Department of Justice (DOJ). The Malaysian Conference of Rulers called for a prompt investigation of the scandal, saying that it was causing a crisis of confidence in Malaysia.

After the 2018 election, the newly elected prime minister, Mahathir Mohamad, reopened investigations into the 1MDB scandal. Malaysian Immigration Department barred Najib and 11 others from leaving the country, while the police seized more than 500 handbags and 12,000 pieces of jewellery estimated to be worth US$270 million from property linked to Najib. Najib was charged with criminal breach of trust, money laundering and abuse of power, while Low Taek Jho (commonly referred to as Jho Low), was charged with money laundering. The U.S. Department of Justice pursued its own investigation into 1MDB, alleging that more than US$4.5 billion was diverted from 1MDB by Jho Low and other conspirators including officials from Malaysia, Saudi Arabia and the United Arab Emirates. Najib was subsequently found guilty of seven charges connected to SRC International, a dummy corporation associated with 1MDB, and was sentenced to twelve years imprisonment.

In September 2020, the alleged amount stolen from 1MDB was estimated to be US$4.5 billion and a Malaysian government report listed 1MBD's outstanding debts to be at US$7.8 billion. The government has assumed 1MDB's debt, which includes 30-year bonds due in 2039.

As of 5 August 2021, in an ongoing effort to fight global kleptocracy, the U.S. Department of Justice recovered and returned a total of US$1.2 billion of 1MDB funds misappropriated within U.S. jurisdiction to the people of Malaysia, joining a list of several countries which have initiated recovery or that have already repatriated smaller recovered amounts.

=== Sabah State Water Department corruption probe ===
One of the largest confiscations in the MACC's history was the Sabah Water Department corruption probe, where a total of RM114.5 million was confiscated, and a money trail led to foreign countries. For over 5 years, both of the two main suspects, who are the internal key people in the department, had taken 60% of state funds channelled by the federal government that were supposedly used for water supply works.

=== Fake Halal Meat Scandal ===
A corruption scandal involving the selling of fake Halal meat in Malaysia over a period of 40 years was discovered in December 2020. A meat cartel was smuggling meat from non-Halal certified sources like Brazil, Bolivia, Canada, China, Colombia, Mexico, Spain and Ukraine. The meat being smuggled included horse, kangaroo and even pork meat, which were mixed and sold as Halal-certified beef.

=== Arrest of Journalist B. Nantha Kumar ===
In March 2025, investigative journalist B. Nantha Kumar was arrested shortly after exposing an alleged migrant trafficking cartel operating at Kuala Lumpur International Airport. The cartel was reportedly run by a retired senior immigration officer and a Pakistani national. Malaysian authorities accused Nantha of soliciting a bribe to withhold certain articles, but his arrest raised concerns about press freedom, especially following the passage of the Malaysian Media Council Bill of 2024. Journalist unions and civil society figures, including lawyer Ambiga Sreenevasan, questioned the timing of the arrest and whether the alleged bribery agent was also apprehended.

== See also ==
- Najib Razak controversies
- Crime in Malaysia
- International Anti-Corruption Academy
- Group of States Against Corruption
- International Anti-Corruption Day
- ISO 37001 Anti-bribery management systems
- United Nations Convention against Corruption
- OECD Anti-Bribery Convention
- Transparency International
