= Mohamad Shukri Abdull =

Malaysian civil servant (born 1960)

Yang Berbahagia Dato' Sri Mohamad Shukri Abdull SSAP DSDK PGDK JSM ASDK AMP BCK
- محمد شكري بن عبد

4th Chief Commissioner of Malaysian Anti-Corruption Commission
- In office 15 May 2018 – 31 May 2019
- Nominated by: Mahathir Mohamad
- Appointed by: Muhammad V
- Deputy: Azam Baki (Operations); Shamsun Baharin Mohd Jamil (Prevention); Ja'afar Mahad (|Management & Professionalism)
- Preceded by: Dzulkifli Ahmad
- Succeeded by: Latheefa Beebi Koya

Personal details
- Born: Mohamad Shukri bin Abdull; 4 October 1960 (age 66) Pendang District, Kedah, Federation of Malaya (now Malaysia)
- Citizenship: Malaysian
- Spouse: Norzah Ahmad
- Children: 5
- Education: National University of Malaysia

Mohamad Shukri bin Abdull (Jawi: محمد شكري بن عبد; born 4 October 1960), is the fourth and former chief commissioner of the Malaysian Anti-Corruption Commission (MACC).

== Education ==
Mohamad Shukri graduated from the National University of Malaysia (UKM) with a Bachelor of Social Science (Honours) (B.Soc.Sc. (Hons.)) degree.

== Career ==
Mohamad Shukri joined the MACC, then known as Anti-Corruption Agency (ACA), on 1 September 1984. Among the posts he has held since included state MACC director of Perlis, Kelantan and Sabah. Between 1 January 2010 and 31 July 2016 Mohamad Shukri served as the MACC's deputy chief commissioner (Operations). The agency announced that Mohamad Shukri would enrol in a course in a local university before retiring in October that same year. This followed allegations that he was among those removed or pressured to step down for being part of a plot to topple the government and soon after MACC's chief commissioner Abu Kassim Mohamed himself resigned. Prior to his sudden departure, it was publicly known that Mohamad Shukri had been spearheading investigations together with Abu Kassim and fellow MACC deputy chief commissioner (Prevention), Mustafar Ali, into a global money laundering scandal involving Prime Minister of Malaysia, Najib Razak. He had completed two investigation papers into the RM2.6 billion "donation" as insisted by Najib and had called over 100 witnesses despite facing many "obstacles and challenges". Eventually, the MACC saw its top three officials removed from office besides Central Bank of Malaysia (Bank Negara) governor Zeti Aziz and also Attorney General of Malaysia (AG), Abdul Gani Patail, all of whom were heavily involved in investigations into the 1Malaysia Development Berhad scandal.

Following Pakatan Harapan's (PH) victory in the 14th Malaysian general election resulting in the removal of Najib as Prime Minister, his newly-appointed successor Mahathir Mohamad reappointed Mohamad Shukri to the MACC, this time as the chief commissioner beginning 15 May 2018. In an emotional tell-all a week later, Mohamad Shukri recalled in a press conference how then-AG Abdul Gani was sacked just as he was preparing to arrest Najib and being trailed as he fled to the United States after receiving intel that he was next on the chopping block. He also added how he had received death threats in the form of bullets delivered to him whilst investigating the 1MDB scandal and had two of his senior officers transferred from the MACC.

On 4 June 2019, it was announced by the Prime Minister's Department that Mohamad Shukri had tendered his resignation effective 1 June 2019 from the post and will be replaced by Latheefa Beebi Koya. Following the shocking announcement, Mohamad Shukri informed the press that he resigned a year before his contract was due to expire as "his job here was done". He added that he had promised Prime Minister Mahathir that he would step down from the job after a year from when he was appointed and that he had accomplished his mission with cases regarding SRC International and 1Malaysia Development Berhad (1MDB) being brought to court.

== Honours ==
=== Honours of Malaysia ===
- Malaysia
  - Companion of the Order of Loyalty to the Crown of Malaysia (JSM) (2008)
- Kedah
  - Knight Companion of the Order of Loyalty to the Royal House of Kedah (DSDK) – Dato' (2008)
  - State of Kedah Distinguished Service Star (BCK) (2005)
- Pahang
  - Knight Grand Companion of the Order of Sultan Ahmad Shah of Pahang (SSAP) – Dato' Sri (2013)
- Perlis
  - Member of the Order of the Crown of Perlis (AMP) (2005)
- Sabah
  - Commander of the Order of Kinabalu (PGDK) – Datuk (2007)
  - Companion of the Order of Kinabalu (ASDK) (2005)
