= Jho Low =

Malaysian businessman and key figure of the 1MDB scandal (born 1981)

- Born: Taek Jho Low; 4 November 1981 (age 45); George Town, Penang, Malaysia
- Citizenship: Malaysia; Saint Kitts and Nevis (2011–2019); Cyprus (2015–2024)
- Education: University of Pennsylvania (BS)
- Occupation: Businessman
- Relatives: Low Meng Tak (grandfather)
- Criminal information
- Disappeared: 24 December 2019 (aged 38); Shanghai Disneyland, China
- Organization: 1MDB
- Criminal charge: Money laundering
- Wanted by: Interpol

Chinese name
- Simplified Chinese: 刘特佐
- Traditional Chinese: 劉特佐
Transcriptions
Standard Mandarin
- Hanyu Pinyin: Liú Tèzuǒ
- IPA: [ljǒʊ tʰɤ̂.tswò]
Yue: Cantonese
- Yale Romanization: Làuh Dahk-jo
- Jyutping: Lau^{4} Dak^{6}-zo^{3}
- IPA: [lɐw˩ tɐk̚˨ tsɔ˧]
Southern Min
- Hokkien POJ: Lâu Te̍k-chó͘

Taek Jho Low (Chinese: 刘特佐; pinyin: Liú Tèzuǒ; born 4 November 1981) is a Malaysian businessman and fugitive who has been wanted by Interpol since 2016 for his key role in the 1MDB scandal. Low is alleged to have stolen over US$4.5 billion from the state-owned company 1MDB.

Born into a wealthy Malaysian family, Low graduated from University of Pennsylvania in 2005. He is the beneficiary of numerous discretionary trust assets which allegedly originated from payments out of the 1MDB fund. Low has maintained his innocence and contends that Malaysian authorities are engaging in a campaign of harassment and political persecution due to his prior support of former prime minister Najib Razak, whose part in the 1MDB scandal had led to Najib being convicted on seven counts of abuse of power, money laundering and criminal breach of trust.

Low was born a citizen of Malaysia, and from 2011, has also held citizenship in Saint Kitts and Nevis, which was revoked in 2019, and Cyprus from 2015 until it was revoked in 2024.

== Early life and education ==
Low was born on 4 November 1981 to a wealthy Malaysian Chinese family. He is of Teochew descent and grew up in George Town in Penang. His grandfather Tan Sri Dato’ Low Meng Tak was a businessman born in Guangdong, China. Meng Tak had interests in iron-ore mining and liquor distilleries in Thailand in the 1960s and 1970s, and in real estate in Thailand, Malaysia, and Hong Kong. Low's father Tan Sri Larry Low Hock Peng founded investment holding company MWE Holdings.

Low was the youngest of three children. He attended Chung Ling High School and The International School of Penang (Uplands) before being sent to the elite Harrow School in London, where he met students from powerful families, including royals from the Middle East and Brunei. In London, he developed a "close relationship" with Riza Aziz, the stepson of former Malaysian Prime Minister Najib Razak. Low then enrolled in the undergraduate program of the University of Pennsylvania's Wharton School, where he continued to develop connections with Malaysians as well as Kuwaiti and Jordanian interests and began managing money for his friends and family. He graduated from Wharton in 2005.

Low can speak English, Malay, Mandarin, Hokkien, Teochew, and basic Arabic.

== Career ==
Low's first major deal was the Kuwait Finance House's 2006 purchase for US$87 million of a luxury high-rise apartment building in Kuala Lumpur. According to The New York Times, "By 2007, Low had formed an investment group that included a Malaysian prince, a Kuwaiti sheikh and a friend from the United Arab Emirates who went on to become ambassador to the United States and Mexico, and is now one of the most powerful right hand persons for the Crown Prince of Abu Dhabi." By 2010, Low had consolidated his fortune into Jynwel Capital, of which Low was the principal steward.

As steward of Jynwel, Low cultivated relationships with some of the world's largest and most reputable sovereign wealth funds, including Abu Dhabi's Mubadala Investment Company and the Kuwait Investment Authority. Jynwel is connected with deals including the acquisition of New York's Park Lane Hotel for US$660 million in 2013 with The Witkoff Group and Mubadala; the takeover of Coastal Energy in 2014 for US$2.2 billion; and the buyout of EMI's music publishing business in 2012 for US$2.2 billion with the Blackstone Group, Sony Corporation and Mubadala. Low was the architect for Jynwel Capital's unsuccessful US$2.2 billion bid to buy Reebok from Adidas AG in October 2014.

Low supported Aziz in the establishment of Red Granite Pictures, a Hollywood production company responsible for films, including The Wolf of Wall Street and Dumb and Dumber To. Recovery of the rights in both movies was the subject of actions for recovery by the US Government in 2013 and 2016. The claims were settled in August 2018, with the settlement stipulating that the payment should not be construed as "an admission of wrongdoing or liability on the part of Red Granite".

In 2019, US authorities pursuing Low described him as a financial intermediary, which allowed him to use his connections to high net worth individuals and international institutions to launder the money stolen through manipulation of the 1Malaysia Development Berhad.

Although earlier in his career Low had often claimed to be investing and making purchases on behalf of other investors or "friends" to maintain a low profile about his family's wealth, in 2015 Low said that his family had considerable independent means. While a 2015 The New York Times article suggested that his family was of "somewhat deflated affluence", a 2014 The Wall Street Journal profile had called him a "scion".

== Legal issues and controversies ==
=== 1Malaysia Development Berhad scandal ===
Najib Razak became Prime Minister of Malaysia in 2009. Soon after, Low became president of the board of advisers for 1Malaysia Development Berhad (1MDB), a Malaysian sovereign wealth fund. Although Low never received an official position, he admits that he occasionally "consulted" with 1MDB, and was involved in a number of transactions connecting his own interests with those of 1MDB, which he claimed were "arms-length and legally sound."

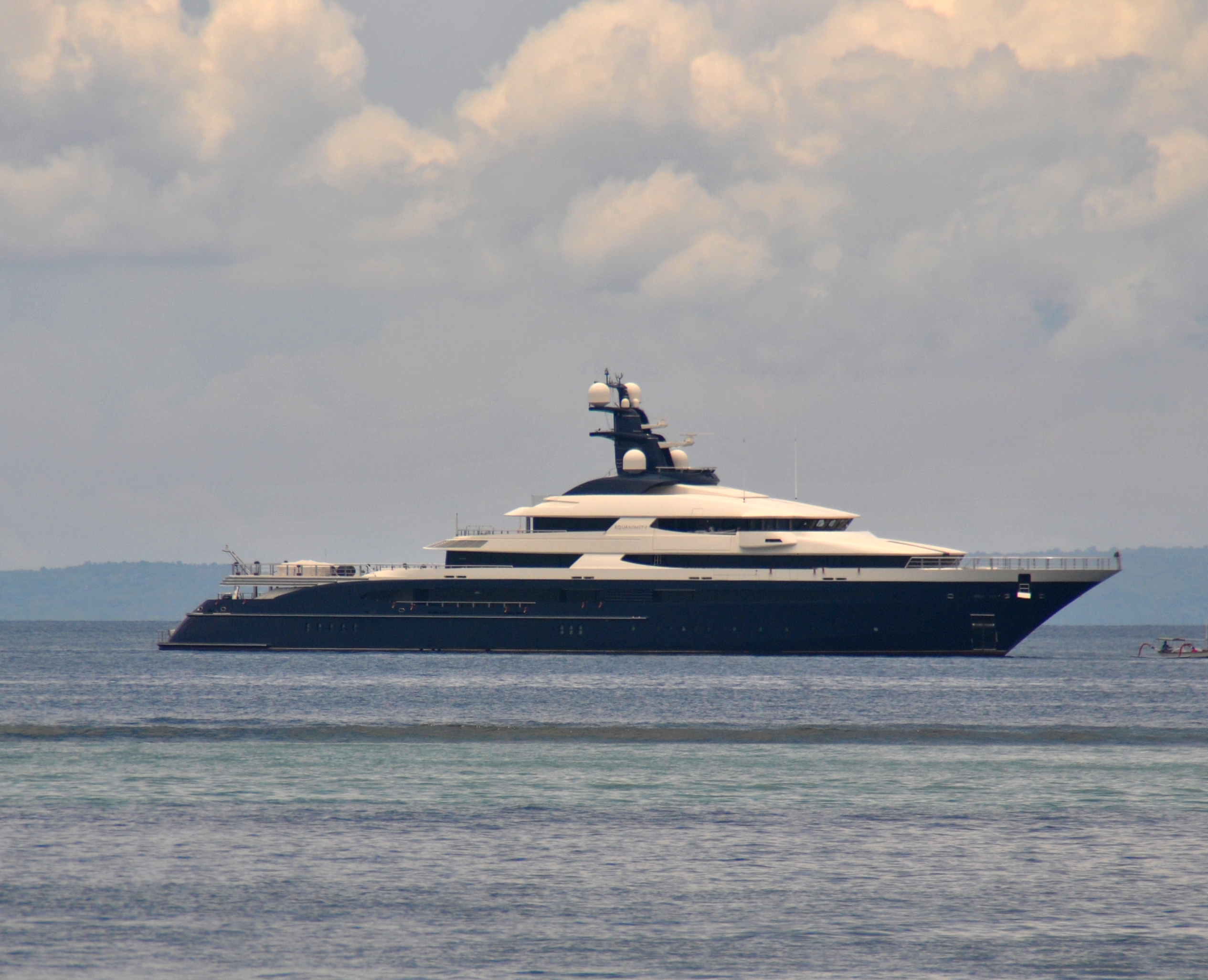
Equanimity, the yacht owned by Low, was allegedly bought using 1Malaysia Development Berhad funds.

The Wall Street Journal has reported that a $33.5 million condominium in Manhattan was owned by a shell company under control of Low's family trust, and then was sold and transferred to a shell company controlled by Najib's stepson. Another home in Beverly Hills, California, "known as the pyramid house for a gold pyramid in its garden", was owned by a shell company controlled by the Low family trust, and was sold and transferred to Najib's stepson by transferring shares of the shell company to him.

In October 2016, Interpol published a red notice at Singapore's request to locate and arrest Low in an investigation related to 1MDB fund flows within its jurisdiction. The request for assistance to provisionally arrest Low was sent to the Hong Kong Department of Justice in April 2016, according to a representative for Singapore's police, but the request was rejected by the Hong Kong authorities.

After the Malaysian general election in 2018, new Prime Minister Mahathir Mohamad re-opened the extensive investigations into the 1MDB matter and, despite prior findings by former Malaysian Attorney General Mohamed Apandi Ali and the Malaysian Anti-Corruption Commission that no crime had been committed, issued arrest warrants against Low. The filing of these charges leading to the arrest warrant were described by a spokesperson for Low as "political reprisal" by the Mahathir regime which was described as having a disregard for the rule of law. In light of the warrants, some consider him a fugitive as he has reportedly been sought by the Malaysian authorities in connection with the 1MDB matter, notwithstanding that Low agreed to assist with the probe.

According to South China Morning Post reports, Low is still involved in affairs of his Hong Kong companies. He signed documents for private equity firm Jynwel Capital and non-profit group Jynwel Charitable Foundation in July 2018, even though Malaysian authorities were looking to arrest him in connection with the 1MDB scandal which he has stated as politically motivated. He was alleged to have been in discussions with the Malaysian government on a potential deal, but the Malaysian government and he did not come to a deal.

Low allegedly purchased a US$325,000 white Ferrari as a wedding gift for Kim Kardashian in 2011. The Department of Justice (DoJ) was reported to have sought restitution from other famous celebrities who had received gifts from Low, among them Leonardo DiCaprio, who has since returned Picasso and Basquiat paintings; and Miranda Kerr who returned diamond jewellery with a market value of US$8 million.

Low invested $100 million into the production of The Wolf of Wall Street, which was subsequently nominated for the Oscars. Leonardo DiCaprio specially thanked Low for his involvement during one of the awards ceremonies. Red Granite, a productions company that was backed by Low, threw a lavish party in Cannes which included a performance by Kanye West.

In June 2017, the US Government, in proceedings brought against certain assets in the Central District of California, sought return of millions worth of assets derived from the Malaysian 1MDB wealth fund. On 1 November 2018, Low and two ex-Goldman Sachs bankers, Tim Leissner and Roger Ng Chong Hwa, were indicted by the United States Department of Justice in connection with the 1MDB allegations.

On 31 October 2019, Low entered into a global, comprehensive settlement with the US government forever resolving all civil, criminal, and administrative proceedings concerning asset forfeiture claims against various Low-linked assets. The settlement did not resolve the government's underlying money laundering and bribery charges and is not otherwise tied to the ongoing U.S. criminal case against him.

In 2019, Low was accused of a connection to the Burning Sun scandal through his friendship with Korean musician Psy; Low, Psy and others denied the allegations. The case was closed for lack of evidence.

On 11 June 2021, the U. S. Department of Justice announced charges related to violation of United States federal law. "Low Taek Jho, 39, also known as Jho Low, and Prakazrel "Pras" Michel, 48, are alleged to have conspired with Elliott Broidy" related to their "... engaging in undisclosed lobbying campaigns at the direction of Low and the Vice Minister of Public Security for the People's Republic of China".

=== As a fugitive ===
Low is believed to be residing in China where he secretly travels extensively through major cities. In November 2020, Al Jazeera reported that Low was currently living in Macau, in "a house owned by a senior member of the Chinese Communist Party." He has managed to travel freely despite the Malaysian police submitting an Interpol red notice. The Chinese government has denied harboring Low, although he was allegedly filmed at Shanghai Disneyland on Christmas Eve 2019 on a witness's cellphone.

In May 2023, Malaysian Prime Minister Anwar Ibrahim said that his government was collaborating with many countries to expedite Low’s extradition back to Malaysia. That same month, Al Jazeera reported that the Malaysian Anti-Corruption Commission (MACC) believed Low was still hiding in Macau.

In November 2024 Najib Razak's lawyer claimed Low could be hiding in Myanmar under the protection of the ruling regime.

According to investigative journalism outlet, Project Brazen, as of 2025, Low is alleged to live in Shanghai with a forged Australian passport under the name "Veis Constantinos Achilles".

=== Civil forfeiture ===
In June 2024, Low agreed to forfeit more than $100 million in assets to settle two civil cases with the U.S. Department of Justice, which includes a luxury apartment in Paris and artwork by Claude Monet and Andy Warhol. This agreement is in addition to a $120 million yacht and another $1 billion previously forfeited by Low and his family. Low continues to face separate criminal cases for money laundering and bribery. Malaysian authorities said they would continue their efforts to track down Low.

== Political activities ==
=== Electioneering in Malaysia ===
Consistent with his personal connections to the Najib Razak family, Low supported and funded the Prime Minister with 1MDB cash during the 2013 elections. He organised a free pro-government concert in his home state of Penang featuring American musicians Busta Rhymes and Ludacris, which was criticised by the local opposition government as unfair electioneering even though Low's close friend claimed the concert was for charity.

=== Lobbying activities in the United States ===
According to a 6 May 2019 United States Department of Justice's indictment, Low was allegedly involved in a conspiracy to gain access to, and potentially influence, Barack Obama's 2012 campaign without disclosing the foreign origins of the money funneled to Obama's Super PAC. The indictment against Low revealed that he directed the transfer of US$21.6 million from foreign entities to former Fugees rapper Pras in 2012 for funneling into the US election.

Low was also helped by former Justice Department employee Higginbotham, who pleaded guilty to a charge in November 2018, to set up bank accounts for a lobbying campaign against the US investigations into the 1MDB scandal. In response, a spokesman for Low stated that "Mr. Low has never made any campaign contribution directly or indirectly in the United States."

The FBI has considered whether a donation of $100,000 to Trump Victory in 2017 originated with Low. The Wall Street Journal reported that $75 million was offered to Elliott Broidy, a businessman and a Republican fundraiser, and his wife if the Justice Department ended its probe into 1MDB.

In June 2021, Low was charged by a federal grand jury for running a back-channel campaign to get the Trump administration to drop an investigation of Low and the 1MDB investment company.

=== Philanthropy ===
Low has contributed money to various charities. However, much, if not all, of his charitable giving occurred after the 1MDB scandal began to unfold, and thus critics claim that the money provided to various charities was stolen from 1MDB and that Low's charitable giving is simply part of a public relations strategy to burnish Low's tarnished image.

== Citizenship ==
Low, born in Malaysia and granted Malaysian citizenship at birth, has reportedly possessed numerous passports obtained by economic citizenship. Low is presumed to have used these passports, from Caribbean and Mediterranean nations, to evade arrest.

Malaysia does not recognize dual citizenship, and in June 2018, Malaysian immigration authorities revoked Low's Malaysian passport on the basis that having more than one passport is a criminal offence in Malaysia.

In 2019, it was reported that Low had been granted a Cypriot passport years earlier, under a Cypriot citizenship investment scheme, "within two days after investing in some property" in Cyprus. At the time, Low had not yet been criminally charged for the 1MDB scandal, but was already under investigation. Low's Cypriot passport came to light after the Cyprus Papers revealed that the Cypriot government, under the presidency of Nicos Anastasiades, had granted citizenship to Cambodian elites, bringing scrutiny to the investment scheme.

== Personal life ==
In early 2014, Low began a romantic relationship with Victoria's Secret model Miranda Kerr. In June 2017, amid an inquiry into the scandal, Kerr surrendered to the US government $8 million in jewellery that Low had given her during their relationship. His associations included Paris Hilton, Leonardo DiCaprio, Kimora Lee Simmons, Jamie Foxx, Busta Rhymes, Kasseem Dean, Emily Ratajkowski, Pras and Alicia Keys.

== See also ==
- Billion Dollar Whale – book about Jho Low
- Corruption in Malaysia
- List of fugitives from justice who disappeared
