= Elliott Broidy =

American businessman (born 1957)

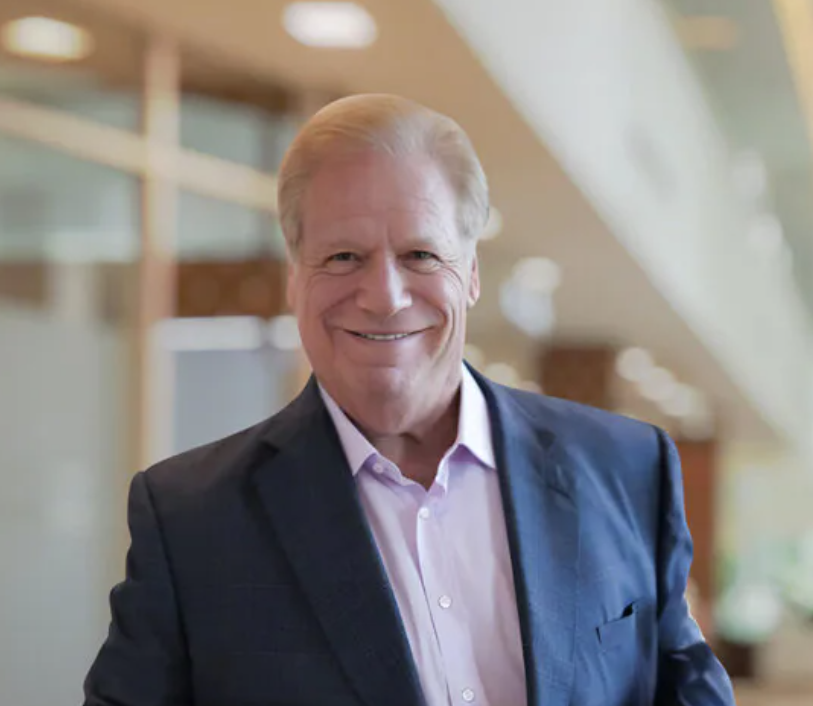
- Born: 1957 (age 69); Westwood, Los Angeles, California, U.S.
- Education: University of Southern California (BS)
- Occupation: Businessman
- Political party: Republican
- Spouse: Robin Rosenzweig
- Children: 3
- Website: elliottbroidy.com

Elliott Broidy (born 1957) is an American businessman. He began as a tax accountant for clients including Muhammad Ali and Taco Bell founder Glen Bell before starting private equity firms. He served in several roles under President George W. Bush, including finance chairman of the Republican National Committee. He pleaded guilty to a misdemeanor during the Alan Hevesi pension scandal in 2009, and helped prosecutors secure the conviction of Hevesi, the former New York State Comptroller.

He was tapped for finance roles during the campaign, transition and inauguration of President Donald Trump's first term, and then became deputy finance chairman for the RNC. He resigned following a reported affair. Later reports suggested he was one of many officials and figures engaged by Malaysian businessman Jho Low, who was seeking to end a United States investigation into Low. Broidy pleaded guilty to a Foreign Agents Registration Act charge, but was pardoned by Trump before the deal was finalized.

== Early life and education ==
Broidy grew up in Los Angeles, the son of a World War II veteran, and a nurse. He is Jewish. He worked his way through the University of Southern California, earning a bachelor's degree in accounting and finance.

== Career ==
Broidy began his career at Arthur Andersen in the tax department, with boxer Muhammad Ali and Taco Bell founder Glen Bell among his clients. He was then hired by Bell to manage the family office, and later founded private investment firm Broidy Capital Management in 1991. He served as a trustee of the Los Angeles City Fire and Police Pension Fund from 2002 to 2009. He founded private equity firm Markstone Capital Partners in 2002.

He was a fundraiser for Republican candidates, including George W. Bush and Donald Trump. This led to his position as finance chairman of the Republican National Committee from 2006 to 2008. He served on the United States Homeland Security Council from 2005 to 2009. Bush named Broidy to the board of trustees of the John F. Kennedy Center for the Performing Arts in 2006. He also served as a trustee of the University of Southern California and USC Hillel, as well as the Wilshire Boulevard Temple, and on the board of governors for Hebrew Union College-Jewish Institute of Religion. He received the Raoul Wallenberg Award in 2008 for his philanthropic support of Israel. He pleaded guilty in 2009 to a misdemeanor of attempting to receive a reward for official misconduct, cooperating with an investigation of former New York State Comptroller Alan Hevesi, which helped secure the convictions of Hevesi and other pension officials for corruption.

He served on the board of trustees of the Simon Wiesenthal Center for six years until July 2015. He also served as a vice chairman of the Trump Victory Committee and as a vice chairman of Trump's first Presidential Inaugural Committee. He served as deputy finance chairman of the RNC from April 2017 to April 2018. He resigned as deputy finance chairman in 2018 following a Wall Street Journal report that Broidy had a sexual relationship with Playboy Playmate Shera Bechard.

He filed a lawsuit in United States federal court in March 2018 against Qatar, alleging a "cyber smear campaign" using American lobbyists that resulted in a series of negative articles against him. The suit against Qatar was dismissed on sovereign immunity grounds, however Broidy filed two related lawsuits against various Qatari agents in 2019. One of those cases had a key issue ruled on during ongoing litigation by the DC Circuit Court of Appeals, which held that the Qatari agents were not shielded from civil liability by derivative sovereign immunity. Both cases against the Qatari agents ultimately reportedly settled in April 2024.

When Malaysian businessman Jho Low sought to end an investigation of his dealings with a Malaysian government development fund, 1Malaysia Development Berhad, he enlisted the support of many Republican consultants and lawyers, including Broidy. Ultimately, he pleaded guilty in October 2020 to a federal charge of conspiracy to serve as an unregistered agent of a foreign principal, Low. President Trump pardoned Broidy on the last day of his first term, before the deal was completed.

He acquired an original whiteprint of the Auschwitz concentration camp crematoria for $1.5 million in 2025, described as a commemoration of the approximately 1.5 million Jewish children murdered during the Holocaust. Proceeds were designated to support the development of a "global early childhood curriculum promoting empathy, altruism and anti-extremism". He stated that the whiteprint would be exhibited at institutions dedicated to Holocaust education and the fight against antisemitism, later to be donated to a public institution.

== Personal life ==
Broidy is married to Robin Rosenzweig, a former senior executive of 20th Century Studios, with whom he has three children.
