= Dzulkifli Ahmad =

Malaysian civil servant

Yang Berbahagia Tan Sri Datuk Dzulkifli Ahmad PSM DPSM
- ذو الكفل بن احمد

3rd Chief Commissioner of Malaysian Anti-Corruption Commission
- In office 1 August 2016 – 14 May 2018
- Nominated by: Najib Razak
- Appointed by: Abdul Halim
- Deputy: Azam Baki (Operations); Shamsun Baharin Mohd Jamil (Prevention); Ja'afar Mahad (Management & Professionalism)
- Preceded by: Abu Kassim Mohamed
- Succeeded by: Mohamad Shukri Abdull

Personal details
- Born: Kepala Batas, North Seberang Perai District, Penang, Malaysia
- Citizenship: Malaysian
- Party: United Malays National Organisation (UMNO) (2025–present)
- Other political affiliations: Barisan Nasional (BN) (2025–present)
- Spouse: Bitizela Mohd Bidin
- Children: 2
- Education: International Islamic University Malaysia

Dzulkifli bin Ahmad (Jawi: ذو الكفل بن احمد) is the third and former chief commissioner of the Malaysian Anti-Corruption Commission (MACC).

He joined UMNO on 14 June 2025.

== Education ==
Dzulkifli graduated from the International Islamic University Malaysia (IIUM) with a Bachelor of Laws (Honours) (LL.B. (Hons.)).

== Career ==
Prior to his appointment as MACC's chief commissioner, Dzulkifli served as the head of the anti-money laundering unit and subsequently National Revenue Recovery Enforcement in Malaysia's Attorney General's Chambers.

Dzulkifli tendered his resignation as MACC chief commissioner effective 14 May 2018, after the change of government to Pakatan Harapan.

Subsequently, he featured as one of the principal players in a set of audio recordings made public at a press conference by the Malaysian Anti-Corruption Commission on 8 January 2020 with regards to telephone conversations relating to alleged efforts to sabotage investigations into the 1Malaysia Development Berhad scandal.

== Honours ==
- Malaysia
  - Commander of the Order of Loyalty to the Crown of Malaysia (PSM) – Tan Sri (2017)
- Malacca
  - Companion Class II of the Exalted Order of Malacca (DPSM) – Datuk (2015)
