= Latheefa =

Latheefa is both a feminine given name and a surname. Notable people with the name include:

- Latheefa Koya (born 1973), a Malaysian politician
- Fathimath Latheefa (fl. 2019), a Maldivian actress
