= Low Meng Tak =

Malaysian businessman and philanthropist

Tan Sri Dato' Low Meng Tak
- Born: 1922; Guangdong, China
- Died: February 27, 2013 (aged 90–91)
- Occupations: Businessman; philanthropist
- Relatives: Jho Low (grandson)

Chinese name
- Traditional Chinese: 劉明達
- Simplified Chinese: 刘明达
Transcriptions
Standard Mandarin
- Hanyu Pinyin: Liú Míngdá
Yue: Cantonese
- Jyutping: Lau4 Ming4 Daat6
Southern Min
- Hokkien POJ: Lâu Bêng-ta̍t
- Teochew Peng'im: Lao5 Mêng5 Dag8

Low Meng Tak (1922 – February 27, 2013) was a Malaysian businessman and philanthropist. He is the grandfather of international fugitive Low Taek Jho who allegedly stole more than US$4.5 billion from the Malaysian sovereign wealth fund 1MDB.

== Early life ==
Low was born in Guangdong, China in 1922. Low immigrated to Malaysia and Thailand in the 1940s, and despite being poor and uneducated started a business.

== Career ==
Low was an entrepreneur and a businessman, interested mainly in iron-ore mining, liquor distilleries, and wine making between 1960 and 1970 in China and Thailand. He also invested in real estate across Asia, of which a portion has been sold over the years. Over the years, Low Meng Tak diversified the family’s business into agriculture and aquaculture, plantations, commodities trading and equity investment, among others. The family fortune was consolidated in 2008 into a global family trust for estate planning purposes. The family's fortune was based also on the sale and development of the remaining land bank over the years.

His son, Tan Sri Larry Low Hock Peng, was the founder and an executive for an investment holding company called MWE Holdings Bhd. Larry was involved in a diversified range of businesses such as textiles, electronics, property, industrial, leisure, plantations and corporate services. Through this, he greatly grew employment opportunities and the economic standing of many in the community. He continued boosting opportunities for those around him in his next project, when he co-founded the Frencken Group Ltd in 1995. He has been the non-executive non-independent chairman of the group since its inception and was appointed as the group’s director in July 2000. Larry’s involvement in these various well-established projects greatly increased the Low family’s wealth.

His grandson Jho Low is a global investor and philanthropist accused of being involved in the 1MDB scandal, which involved Malaysia's then-Prime Minister Najib Razak and the channeling of funds from 1MDB to Najib’s personal bank accounts. As a businessman, Jho Low invested in numerous companies and investment projects of various sizes and complexity, including in media and entertainment, consumer and retail, real estate, and infrastructure.

Low Meng Tak died of leukemia in February 2013.

== Philanthropy ==
Low Meng Tak donated money to fund building of schools in Puning China, as well as scholarships for primary schools and medical centres in Guangdong, China. His grandchildren Jho Low and Szen Low incorporated the Low Meng Tak foundation (Jynwel Foundation) on his behalf, and donated to various organizations.

== Honours ==
- Malaysia
  - Commander of the Order of Loyalty to the Crown of Malaysia (PSM) – Tan Sri (2013)
