= Keluarga Malaysia =

Malaysian political concept introduced in 2021

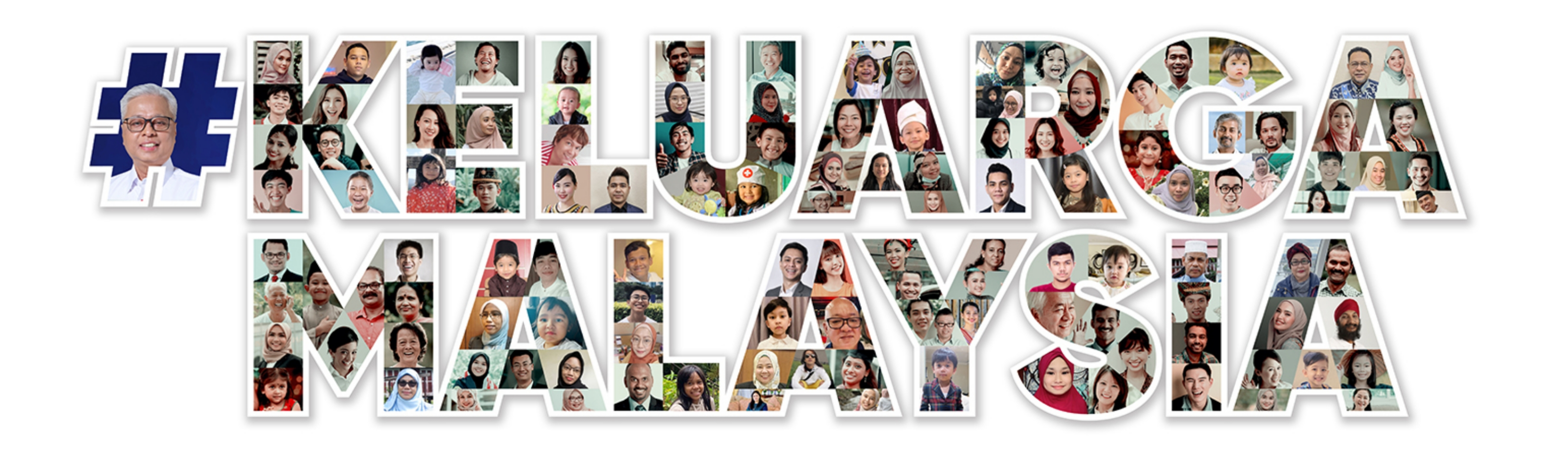

Keluarga Malaysia (English: 'Malaysian family') was an idea introduced by Ismail Sabri Yaakob on 22 August 2021 in his inaugural speech as prime minister. It was officially launched on 23 October 2021 in Kuching, Sarawak. This idea encouraged Malaysians to put aside their differences and work together to rebuild the nation in order to combat the COVID-19 pandemic in Malaysia and achieve the Shared Prosperity Vision 2030.

When Anwar Ibrahim was appointed as prime minister in 2022, the Keluarga Malaysia concept was abolished and replaced with his own idea, Malaysia Madani in 2023.

== Overview ==
The Keluarga Malaysia concept was first announced as a national agenda by the then Deputy Prime Minister, Wan Azizah Wan Ismail in November 2019, a few months before the political crisis occurred. However, it was officially introduced as an idea by Ismail Sabri Yaakob in his inaugural speech as the ninth Prime Minister of Malaysia on 22 August 2021. According to Ismail Sabri, this concept was inclusive across the boundaries of religion and race and invited all citizens in the country to come together as a whole family. This concept was chosen because it was "inclusive, close to the people and showed a value of concern and love for all members of the country's big family". Ismail Sabri in his speech said:

"It crosses the boundaries of religion, race and race. We are aware of the existence of families that are made up of various races and religions, but family values bind them all. That is why the concept of the Malaysian Family is taken, because for me, the integrity of the country is tied to the values of perfect education in a family. We are one family regardless of religion, race and race. Each of you is like my own family, whether young or old. We are likened to complementing each other, like body parts that need each other."

=== Core ===
The concept of Keluarga Malaysia outlined three main cores and 20 value enrichments that underlay the new administration led by Ismail Sabri, to work together in recovering the country from the problems and effects of the COVID-19 pandemic. The three main cores were Inclusion, Togetherness and Gratitude.

=== Public policy ===
The goal of the Malaysian Family was to place unity and harmony as the foundation of the nation. Key Happiness Outcome (KHO) was used to monitor the implementation of this concept to complement Key Performance Indicators (KPI). According to Ismail Sabri, KHO and KPI were the commitment and determination of the government to bring the country out of the fatigue of the COVID-19 pandemic and to improve the country's position in the World Happiness Index chart or World Happiness Report, which was then in 81st position.

According to Ismail Sabri, the Malaysian Family was centred on the greatness of the Federal Constitution as enshrined in the Rukun Negara, and the value of each family was also considered to be an important component in determining the rise or fall of Malaysia. He also assured that the fate of every individual in the Malaysian Family would be protected.

== Initiative ==
=== Skuad Keluarga Malaysia ===
The Skuad Keluarga Malaysia was established to coordinate all aid delivery mechanisms for people in need throughout the country. Led by the Department of Social Welfare (JKM) and the Ministry of Women, Family and Community Development, this squad was a collaboration of various agencies under different ministries, private parties and non-governmental organizations (or NGOs).

=== Yayasan Keluarga Malaysia ===
The Yayasan Keluarga Malaysia was launched on 23 October 2021 with the aim of helping children affected by the spread of the COVID-19 pandemic in Malaysia. Through this foundation, the children of Malaysian families had the opportunity to receive support, especially in terms of education, until they reached the age of 18.

=== Keluarga Malaysia Pass ===
The Keluarga Malaysia Pass was launched on 22 November 2021 to encourage the public to use public services and was issued by Prasarana Malaysia Berhad (Prasarana). This pass allowed four individuals in a group to enjoy unlimited one-day travel on Saturdays, Sundays and public holidays for only RM15. According to Ismail Sabri, "This aimed to encourage Malaysian families to have fun, go out and spend quality time with their loved ones while visiting shopping centres or interesting places around the public transport network in Kuala Lumpur and Selangor".

=== Jualan Keluarga Malaysia ===
The Jualan Keluarga Malaysia program was launched on 2 December 2021 with a two-pronged strategy of eliminating the role of middlemen and offering goods at subsidized prices for the benefit of the people. It was implemented in selected locations and its frequency was increased as appropriate from time to time, compared to the original plan of twice a month.

== Acceptance ==
Former Prime Minister Muhyiddin Yassin praised this concept.

== Song ==
The theme song of this idea, "Keluarga Malaysia", was a quote from the Minister of Communications and Multimedia, Annuar Musa, published by the Yayasan Persahabatan Malaysia (PERMAI) in collaboration with Rocketfuel Entertainment. It was performed by Ara Johari, Masya Masyitah, Putra Muhammad and Sufi Rashid. This song was played for the first time to the public during the 64th National Day Celebration on 31 August 2021.

== Controversy ==
On 2 January 2024, the Malaysian Anti-Corruption Commission began an investigation into allegations of corruption linked to Ismail Sabri. A high-ranking source claimed that there were allegations of corruption in the contract related to the promotional activities of the "Keluarga Malaysia" concept introduced by Ismail Sabri in August 2021.
