= Malaysia Madani =

Malaysian governance policy framework

Logo of the political slogan

Malaysia Madani (English: Civilised Malaysia) is a political slogan introduced by the administration of the 10th Prime Minister, Anwar Ibrahim to refer to the policy framework of his government. The concept focuses on good governance, sustainable development and racial harmony.

Malaysia Madani serves as the replacement for Keluarga Malaysia, of the administration of the 9th Prime Minister, Ismail Sabri Yaakob.

== Overview ==
The Malaysia Madani concept was first published in a book and launched on 2 October 2022 in the Dorsett Grand Hotel in Subang, a month before the 2022 Malaysia general election. After Anwar's appointment as the Prime Minister, the Malaysia Madani concept was introduced as a national policy on 19 January 2023 in Putrajaya.

Madani is the acronym for the core values: keMampanan (sustainability), kesejAhteraan (prosperity), Daya cipta (innovation), hormAt (respect), keyakiNan (confidence) and Ihsan (compassion). The concept mainly targets the following domains:

- Economy and finance
- Legislation
- Institution
- Education
- Community
- Culture
- Urban
- Rural

== See also ==
- Slogans from previous administrations
  - Wawasan 2020 (Mahathir Mohamad's first tenure)
  - Islam Hadhari (Abdullah Ahmad Badawi)
  - 1Malaysia (Najib Razak)
  - Malaysia Baharu (Mahathir Mohamad's second tenure)
  - Malaysia Prihatin (Muhyiddin Yassin)
  - Keluarga Malaysia (Ismail Sabri Yaakob)
