= Tabung Harapan Malaysia =

- Formation: 30 May 2018
- Dissolved: 14 January 2019
- Type: Government fund
- Purpose: To receive the people's donation to help government pay the country's debt
- Headquarters: Putrajaya, Malaysia
- Fields: Finance
- Key people: Prime Minister Mahathir Mohamad; Minister of Finance Lim Guan Eng
- Parent organization: Ministry of Finance
- Revenue: MYR 205,491,219

Tabung Harapan Malaysia (Malay for "Malaysia's Hope Fund", Abbr.: THM) is a fund launched by the returned seventh Malaysian Prime Minister of the new Pakatan Harapan (PH) government, Mahathir Mohamad on 30 May 2018. The purpose of the fund is a platform for the people to help the country and to receive the people's donations to strengthen the government's finances. The establishment of the fund was made after seeing the willingness of the people to donate to the new government to settle the country's national debt amounting to more than RM1 trillion derived after taking over the previous Barisan Nasional (BN) administration led by Najib Razak on the 9 May 2018 general election.

THM was supposed to be closed on 31 December 2018 but was finally extended to 14 January 2019 after Cabinet of Malaysia agreed to prolong the campaign for contributions for two more weeks.

As of 31 March 2019, THM has earned a sum of RM203,292,117.41 or about RM203.29 million, including interest received from fixed deposit investments amounted to RM575,342.31 up to 31 March. Minister of Finance Lim Guan Eng announced the whole funds will be used to settle a portion of 1Malaysia Development Berhad (1MDB) 2019 debt amounting to RM1.7bil. He also stressed while it may not be able to repay 1MDB's entire debt of RM51bil, the fund serves as a symbol of Malaysians' loyalty and patriotism, when it comes to helping to repay the country's debt.

Lim had announced the last total collection of THM which stood at RM205,491,219, including interest that was earned from the trust account where the donation was deposited, has been fully utilised to pay off the 1MDB debts on 30 November 2019.

== Issue ==
The Malaysian opposition leader and former Deputy Prime Minister of BN, Ahmad Zahid Hamidi accuses the government of taking a populist approach by launching THM. He slammed the PH government’s decision to launch THM, by saying that the government should not burden the people to donate funds in order to help it meet its debt obligations.
