= Abdul Halim Aman =

Malaysian government official (born 1957)

Yang Berbahagia Dato' Sri Abdul Halim Aman SSAP SIMP DGSM DSAP DIMP DMSM
- عبدالحليم أمان

7th Chief Commissioner of the Malaysian Anti-Corruption Commission
- Incumbent
- Assumed office 13 May 2026
- Monarch: Ibrahim
- Prime Minister: Anwar Ibrahim
- Preceded by: Azam Baki

Personal details
- Born: Abdul Halim bin Aman; 10 March 1957 (age 69) Kampung Alai, Malacca, Malaysia
- Spouse: Safiah Md Tahir
- Education: Universiti Malaya (LLB); University of Hull (LLM)
- Profession: Judge

Abdul Halim bin Aman (Jawi: عبدالحليم بن أمان; born 10 March 1957) is a Malaysian judge who served as the seventh chief commissioner of the Malaysian Anti-Corruption Commission since May 2026, replacing Azam Baki. He also served as the Judge of the Penang High Court in 2009 until 2010, Judge of the Johor Bahru High Court in 2010 until 2013 and Judge of the Shah Alam High Court from 2013 until 2023.

== Early life and education ==
Abdul Halim bin Aman was born on 10 March 1957 at Kampung Alai, Malacca, Malaysia. He received his Bachelor of Laws (LLB) from the Universiti Malaya (UM) on 1982 and Master of Laws (LLM) from the University of Hull on 1996.

== Legal career (1982–2023) ==
Abdul Halim began his legal career in 1982 as a Federal Counsel at the Attorney General's Chambers. In 1983, he was appointed as a Magistrate in Kluang, Johor. He later served as Senior Assistant Registrar of the High Court of Malaya in Malacca in 1985. In 1987, Abdul Halim became a Senior Magistrate in Muar, Johor. He was appointed as a Sessions Court Judge in Tawau, Sabah in 1990 and subsequently served in the same capacity in Sandakan, Sabah in 1992. That same year, he was also appointed as Deputy Registrar of the Federal Court and later served as a Sessions Court Judge in Kuala Lumpur.

In 1993, Abdul Halim took on the role of Senior Federal Counsel at the Inland Revenue Board before returning to the Attorney General's Chambers in 1995 in the same capacity. In 1994, he had served as a Sessions Court Judge in George Town, Penang. In 1996, Abdul Halim was appointed as Official Assignee at the Department of Insolvency (then known as the Department of Official Assignee). The following year, in 1997, he became the State Legal Adviser of Pahang.

In 2003, Abdul Halim served concurrently as Deputy Public Prosecutor at the Attorney General's Chambers, Sessions Court Judge in Ampang, Selangor and Head of Research Division at the Office of the Chief Justice.

In 2005, he was appointed as a Judicial Commissioner at the High Court in Temerloh before being transferred to Kuantan in 2006. Shortly thereafter, Abdul Halim was appointed as a High Court Judge on 11 April 2007. In 2009, he began serving as a Judge of the High Court in Penang (2009) and Johor Bahru High Court (2010) before continuing a lengthy tenure at the Shah Alam High Court from 2013 until his mandatory retirement in March 2023.

== 7th chief commissioner of MACC (2026–present) ==
He will be appointed as the seventh chief commissioner of the Malaysian Anti-Corruption Commission on 13 May 2026.

== Honours ==
=== Honours of Malaysia ===
- Malacca
  - Grand Commander of the Exalted Order of Malacca (DGSM) – Datuk Seri (2026)
  - Companion of the Exalted Order of Malacca (DMSM) – Datuk (2014)
- Pahang
  - Knight Grand Companion of the Order of Sultan Ahmad Shah of Pahang (SSAP) – Dato' Sri (2022)
  - Knight Grand Companion of the Order of the Crown of Pahang (SIMP) – Dato' Indera (2006)
  - Knight Companion of the Order of Sultan Ahmad Shah of Pahang (DSAP) – Dato' (2001)
  - Knight Companion of the Order of the Crown of Pahang (DIMP) – Dato' (1998)
