= Latheefa Koya =

Malaysian lawyer

5th Chief Commissioner of the Malaysian Anti-Corruption Commission
- In office 1 June 2019 – 6 March 2020
- Nominated by: Mahathir Mohamad
- Appointed by: Abdullah
- Deputy: Azam Baki (Operations); Shamsun Baharin Mohd Jamil (Prevention); Ja'afar Mahad (Management & Professionalism)
- Preceded by: Mohamad Shukri Abdull
- Succeeded by: Azam Baki

Executive Director of Lawyers for Liberty
- In office July 2018 – 31 May 2019
- Preceded by: Eric Paulsen
- Succeeded by: Melissa Sasidaran

Advisor of Lawyers for Liberty
- In office January 2011 – July 2018
- Preceded by: Office established
- Succeeded by: N. Surendran

Personal details
- Born: Latheefa Beebi Koya; 4 February 1973 (age 53) Kerala, India
- Citizenship: Malaysian
- Party: People's Justice Party (PKR) (2008–2019)
- Other political affiliations: Pakatan Rakyat (PR) (2008–2015); Pakatan Harapan (PH) (2015–2019)
- Occupation: Politician, human rights activist
- Profession: Lawyer

Latheefa Beebi Koya (Latīpha Bīvi Kēāya; born 4 February 1973), often called Kak Lat, is a Malaysian politician, lawyer and human rights activist who was the fifth Chief Commissioner of the Malaysian Anti-Corruption Commission (MACC) from June 2019 to March 2020. She was a member of the People's Justice Party (PKR) and sat on the central executive committee of PKR. She is the first woman and non-Malay to assume office as chief-commissioner.

== Early life ==
Latheefa Koya was born in Kerala, India and later moved to Kuala Lumpur, Malaysia at the age of 3 months. She is a human rights activist, politician and lawyer. After moving to Malaysia, Latheefa grew up at the city of Petaling Jaya.

== Education ==
Latheefa graduated from the University of London with a Bachelor of Laws (Honours) (LL.B. (Hons.)) in 1997. She later obtained the Malaysian Certificate in Legal Practice in August 1999, enabling her to practice as a lawyer in Malaysia.

== Career ==
Latheefa was called to the Malaysian Bar in 2001. Since May 2002, she has practiced law in Messrs Daim & Gamany, co-founded by Abdul Daim Zainuddin, former Finance Minister of Malaysia, as an advocate and solicitor.

Between June 2008 and July 2012, Latheefa was a member of the Petaling Jaya City Council (MBPJ), but quit from her post after rumours emerged regarding her expulsion from the council. She later co-founded Lawyers for Liberty (LFL) alongside former Padang Serai Member of Parliament (MP), N. Surendran, in 2011. She served as its advisor until 2018 before becoming its executive director.

=== People's Justice Party ===
First entering politics as a member of Parti Rakyat Malaysia, she was a notable public figure during the Reformasi era.

Latheefa was part of the merger negotiations between PRM and Parti Keadilan Nasional which led to the formation of Parti Keadilan Rakyat in 2003.

She then served as information bureau chief for PKR's Youth Wing and the legal affairs bureau chief for PKR.

Latheefa revealed the purpose behind the move orchestrated to remove Khalid Ibrahim as Menteri Besar of Selangor in 2014 by one of PKR's vice presidents, Rafizi Ramli, was to prevent PKR deputy president, Mohamed Azmin Ali, from becoming the Menteri Besar of Selangor. The Kajang Move, however, failed to achieve its true motives.

In June 2018, Latheefa criticised the Pakatan Harapan (PH) government for encouraging a young child to donate to the Tabung Harapan Malaysia (THM) fund. A month later, she criticised the Deputy Prime Minister of Malaysia and former PKR president, Wan Azizah Wan Ismail, for allegedly delaying prosecution against a man who wanted to marry an underage girl.

In November 2018, Latheefa called PKR president Wan Azizah's visit to Julau ahead of Sarawak PKR polls as "inappropriate" due to the usage of government machinery and announcement of allocations in the presence of one of the candidates, Julau MP Larry Sng. She then called for the party to suspend the upcoming polls for Julau following a massive spike in the division membership from 603 to over 13,000 just a day later, alleging that party leaders are "whitewashing" the episode and legitimising fraud.

On 17 December 2018, Latheefa launched a scathing attack on her new PKR president, Anwar Ibrahim, over his appointments of PKR state liaison chiefs, alleging "cronyism and nepotism" after many of the selections did not receive majority support from respective state division chiefs. Her comments drew rebukes from her own party members, criticising her for openly criticising the party president and submitted a disciplinary complaint against her to the party. Latheefa responded by saying that using "UMNO (United Malay National Organisation)-style tactics" to silence her will not succeed. Soon after her comments, Anwar's daughter and Permatang Pauh MP Nurul Izzah Anwar resigned from all party posts whilst Pasir Gudang MP Hassan Abdul Karim rejected the offer to become the Johor PKR state liaison chief.

=== MACC Chief Commissioner ===
On 4 June 2019, Latheefa was appointed as Mohamad Shukri Abdull's successor as chief commissioner of the MACC on a two-year contract effective 1 June 2019. Fellow PKR member and Lembah Pantai MP, Ahmad Fahmi Mohamed Fadzil, called for her resignation from the party to avoid conflict of interests. This was followed by a response from Latheefa herself, who tweeted that she had already submitted her resignation as an ordinary PKR member on 3 June 2019, after being informed of her impending appointment. LFL also released a statement announcing that its co-founder has relinquished her position and membership within the organisation. She became the first woman to be appointed to the post. Her appointment drew mixed reactions from politicians and members of the public alike, receiving praise for being known for her no-nonsense approach but criticised by others as her appointment did not go through parliament and due to her political background. Among those who praised her appointment but questioned the process of doing so included former Coalition for Clean and Fair Elections (Bersih) chairperson, Petaling Jaya MP Maria Chin Abdullah, and Centre to Combat Corruption and Cronyism (C4) executive director Cynthia Gabriel. Malaysian Chinese Association (MCA) president Wee Ka Siong called her appointment "mind-boggling" whilst Muara Tuang assemblyman Idris Buang from the United Bumiputera Heritage Party (PBB) labelled the appointment "repugnant". Other society leaders including Marina Mahathir and former Malaysian Bar Council president, Ambiga Sreenevasan, hailed her appointment. On 25 June 2019, Latheefa was sworn-in as the Chief Commissioner of the MACC before the Yang di-Pertuan Agong (King of Malaysia).

In her first press conference after taking office, Latheefa announced that the MACC had filed civil forfeiture suits against 41 entities amounting to RM270 million allegedly related to the 1MDB scandal. The largest sum amounting to RM212 million was attributed to the aggregate sum received by the various state branches of the United Malay National Organisation (UMNO). Other notable alleged recipients of misappropriate funds included the Malaysian Chinese Association (MCA), Sarawak United People's Party (SUPP), Liberal Democratic Party (LDP), United Sabah People's Party (PBRS) and former ministers Kasitah Gaddam, Hasan Malek and Ismail Abdul Muttalib.

== Controversies ==
The Parliamentary Select Committee (PSC) on Major Public Appointments chairman, Selayang MP William Leong, has initially confirmed that PSC was not consulted over Latheefa's appointment. Prominent lawyer and former Federal Court of Malaysia judge, Gopal Sri Ram, remarked that the legislature "has no role to play" in Latheefa's appointment as chief commissioner of MACC. Somehow on 4 July 2019, Latheefa has finally met with the PSC on her MACC appointment which both responded positively after the meeting and the report on the PSC meeting would be tabled in the Parliament.

Latheefa was questioned by the UMNO supreme council member Lokman Noor Adam over her "many" awards and medals on her uniform as MACC chief despite serving in the post for less than a month and criticisms of her uniform went viral on social media on 28 June 2019. She in admitting she was just beginning learning about uniforms, rank badges and ribbon bars; also claimed they were essentially correct and acceptable although there were some minor discrepancies in the ribbon bars which have been rectified. She explained that the MACC's uniform and its paraphernalia were mandated according to the Standing Order of the MACC chief commissioner, Chapter A (Policy) No 1 of 2012. She also stressed her priority to combat corruption took precedence over appearance of her uniform.
