= Malaysian Anti-Corruption Commission =

Government anti-graft body

Malaysian Anti-Corruption Commission Suruhanjaya Pencegahan Rasuah Malaysia سوروهنجاي ڤنچڬاهن رسواه مليسيا
- Logo of the Malaysian Anti-Corruption Commission
- Abbreviation: MACC / SPRM
- Motto: Bebas, Telus, Profesional; Independent, Transparent, Professional

Agency overview
- Formed: 1967; 59 years ago
- Preceding agencies: Anti-Corruption Agency (1964–1971, 1989–2010); National Bureau of Investigations (1973–1982)
- Employees: 2,937 (2017)
- Annual budget: MYR 216,220,000 (2017)

Jurisdictional structure
- National agency (Operations jurisdiction): Malaysia
- Operations jurisdiction: Malaysia
- Legal jurisdiction: National
- Governing body: Government of Malaysia
- Constituting instrument: MACC Act 2009
- General nature: Civilian police
- Specialist jurisdiction: Anti-corruption

Operational structure
- Headquarters: MACC Headquarters, No. 2 Lebuh Wawasan, Precinct 7, Putrajaya
- Agency executives: Abdul Halim Aman, Chief Commissioner; Ahmad Khusairi Yahaya, Deputy Chief Commissioner (Operations); Norazlan Mohd Razali, Deputy Chief Commissioner (Prevention); Junipah Wandi, Deputy Chief Commissioner (Management & Professionalism)

The Malaysian Anti-Corruption Commission headquarters in Putrajaya

The Malaysian Anti-Corruption Commission (Malay: Suruhanjaya Pencegahan Rasuah Malaysia; Jawi: سوروهنجاي ڤنچڬاهن رسواه مليسيا), abbreviated as MACC or SPRM (formerly known as the Anti-Corruption Agency or Badan Pencegah Rasuah), is a government agency in Malaysia that investigates and prosecutes corruption in the public and private sectors.

== History ==
The Malaysian Anti-Corruption Commission (MACC) was formed in January 2009 from its predecessor, the Anti-Corruption Agency, created in October 1967 in order to combat corruption.

The agency is headed by Chief Commissioner Azam Baki, who replaced Latheefa Koya on 9 March 2020.

== Duties ==
The MACC was modelled after top anti-corruption agencies, such as the Independent Commission Against Corruption of Hong Kong and the Independent Commission Against Corruption in New South Wales, Australia.

Its purpose is to combat corruption and abuse of power. It is responsible for investigating corruption cases and ensuring that those involved in the crime are punished.

The MACC also educates Malaysians on how to avoid corruption. It holds various programs, such as talks and campaigns, to raise awareness about the dangers of corruption to people and the nation.

== Monitoring ==
There are five independent bodies that monitor the MACC to ensure its integrity and to protect citizen rights. These bodies are managed separately from other government offices, in order to provide an independent perspective.

The five bodies are:

1. the Anti-Corruption Advisory Board
2. the Special Committee on Corruption
3. the Complaints Committee
4. the Operations Review Panel
5. the Corruption Consultation and Prevention Panel

== List of MACC chief commissioners ==
- Ahmad Said Hamdan (14 May 2007 – 31 December 2009)
- Abu Kassim Mohamed (1 January 2010 – 31 July 2016)
- Dzulkifli Ahmad (1 August 2016 – 14 May 2018)
- Mohamad Shukri Abdull (17 May 2018 – 4 June 2019)
- Latheefa Beebi Koya (4 June 2019 – 6 March 2020)
- Azam Baki (9 March 2020 – 12 May 2026)
- Abdul Halim Aman (13 May 2026 – present)

== Anti-Corruption Tactical Squad ==
The Anti-Corruption Tactical Squad (ACTS), established in 2024, is the elite tactical unit of the MACC, trained to handle high-risk scenarios and provide enhanced security for MACC officers during sensitive operations.

Specialising in close-quarters combat and tactical operations, ACTS operatives receive intensive training from the 69 Commando at its training centre in Ulu Kinta, ensuring their preparedness for any situation.

== Notable investigations and controversies ==
=== High-profile investigations ===
On 31 July 2010, the MACC chief, Abu Kassim Mohamed, pledged to resign if any graft reports were not investigated by his agency, including high-profile cases involving government ministers. In a challenge, Raja Petra Kamarudin, a popular online blogger and political activist, began publishing what he claimed were MACC copies of investigation reports against the former Anti-Corruption Agency chief Zulkifly Mat Noor, National Civics Bureau director-general Shagul Hamid Abdullah, and former Menteri Besar of Selangor Khir Toyo. Also included was a preliminary investigation based on a report where Kulim assemblyman Lim Soo Nee claimed that he was offered a bribe to defect to the Barisan Nasional political coalition.

=== Deaths in custody ===
On 16 July 2009, Teoh Beng Hock was found dead on the fifth floor of Plaza Masalam after falling from the 14th floor, subsequent to giving a statement to MACC officers in the Selangor office in Shah Alam. Beng Hock was the political aide to state assemblyman and executive councillor Ean Yong Hian Wah, and he was being questioned as part of an alleged corruption investigation involving Hian Wah. An inquest was held, and the coroner returned an open verdict. Following this, a Royal Commission of Inquiry was set up to ascertain the cause of death. It released its findings on 21 July 2011, deciding that Beng Hock had committed suicide. His family refused to accept the findings, however, and insisted that he had been murdered.

On 6 April 2011, Ahmad Sarbani Mohamed, a customs officer, was found dead after falling from the third floor of the Federal Territory MACC office in Kuala Lumpur. He was alleged to have been part of a corruption investigation involving 62 customs officers.

=== Murder of high-ranking MACC officer ===
Anthony Kevin Morais was a deputy public prosecutor for the Attorney General's Chambers of Malaysia and the MACC. He was last seen alive on 4 September 2015, leaving his Menara Duta condominium in Segambut, Kuala Lumpur, for work in Putrajaya. His youngest brother filed a missing person's report late the next day. Earlier, a car matching the model Morais owned was found at a palm oil plantation in Perak. His body was found in a concrete-filled drum in Subang Jaya, Selangor, on 16 September 2015.

=== Sabah State Water Department corruption probe ===
On 4 October 2016, the MACC confiscated more than RM114.5 million during an operation into the Sabah State Water Department office, with the ex-deputy chief commissioner, Azam Baki, describing it as the first large haul involving corruption in the commission's history.

=== Arrest of former Prime Minister Najib Razak ===
On 3 July 2018, former prime minister Najib Razak was arrested by the MACC as part of an investigation into RM42 million (US$10.6 million) transferred into his bank account from SRC International Sdn Bhd, the investment company of 1Malaysia Development Berhad. The police seized 1,400 necklaces, 567 handbags, 423 watches, 2,200 rings, 1,600 brooches, and 14 tiaras worth $273 million.

On 28 July 2020, the Malaysian High Court convicted Razak on all seven counts of abuse of power, money laundering, and criminal breach of trust. He was the first Malaysian prime minister to have been convicted of corruption, and he was sentenced to 12 years' imprisonment and fined RM210 million.

=== Alleged corruption by former prime minister Ismail Sabri ===
In March 2025, former prime minister Ismail Sabri Yaakob was named a suspect in a corruption probe involving RM700 million (US$160 million) in government funds under the Keluarga Malaysia promotion campaign. Following a raid of several "safe houses", the MACC seized RM177 million (US$40.5 million) of cash (in various currencies; only RM14 million was in Malaysian ringgit), luxury items, and gold. Yaakob was called in for questioning, but the session was delayed, as he had collapsed at home a day after the raids.

== See also ==
- Corruption in Malaysia
