= Azam Baki =

Malaysian government official (born 1963)

Yang Berbahagia Tan Sri Datuk Seri Panglima Azam Baki PSM SPSK SPDK SMW SSAP PJN PNBS DMSM DSAP DIMP AMN AAP
- عزم باقي
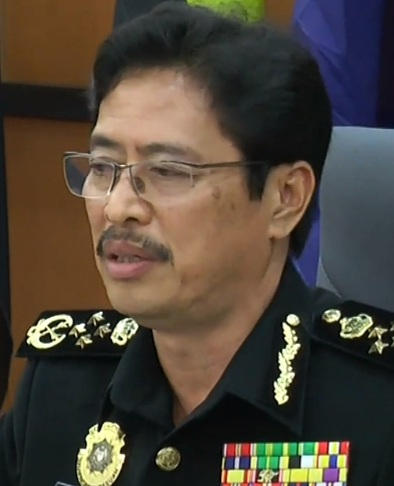
- Azam in 2021

6th Chief Commissioner of the Malaysian Anti-Corruption Commission
- In office 9 March 2020 – 12 May 2026
- Nominated by: Muhyiddin Yassin
- Appointed by: Abdullah
- Monarchs: Abdullah; Ibrahim
- Prime Minister: Muhyiddin Yassin; Ismail Sabri Yaakob; Anwar Ibrahim
- Preceded by: Latheefa Koya
- Succeeded by: Abdul Halim Aman

Personal details
- Born: Azam bin Mat Baki; 12 May 1963 (age 63) Negeri Sembilan, Federation of Malaya
- Citizenship: Malaysia
- Spouse: Normah Mohd Zin
- Children: 2
- Parent(s): Mat Baki Nordin; Maimun Bador
- Education: University of Technology Malaysia; University of Malaya; Asia e University
- Occupation: Investigation officer

Azam bin Mat Baki (Jawi: عزام بن باقي; born 12 May 1963) is a Malaysian government official who served as the sixth chief commissioner of the Malaysian Anti-Corruption Commission (MACC) from 2020 to 2026.

He has been the subject of controversy after it was revealed that he owned an excessive amount of stock while sitting on the top rank of MACC.

== Early life and education ==
Azam was born on 12 May 1963 in Negeri Sembilan, Federation of Malaya to Mat Baki Nordin and Maimun Bador. He is the eldest of three brothers. His brothers were Radzuan (born 1966) and Nasir (born 1969). He obtained Diploma of Engineering (DipEng) in Electrical (Power) from University of Technology Malaysia, Bachelor of Jurisprudence (B.Juris) from University of Malaya and master's degree from Asia e University.

== Career ==
Azam began his career as an Assistant Investigation Officer at the Anti-Corruption Agency (ACA) in 1984. He quickly rose through the ranks from there, becoming Director of Intelligence in 2013, Director of Investigation in 2015, Deputy Chief Commissioner (Operations) in 2016, and Chief Commissioner in 2020.

== Controversies and issues ==
=== Stock ownership scandal ===
==== Lalitha Kunaratnam's articles ====
Lalitha Kunaratnam, an investigative journalist, published two articles titled “Business ties among MACC leadership: How deep does it go? (Part 1)” and “Business ties among MACC leadership: How deep does it go (Part 2)” on the Independent News Service news portal. The article provides details about business link among a group of individuals including Azam Baki, former chief commissioner of MACC Abu Kassim Mohamed, two of Azam's brothers, Abu Kassim's son, and all five's alleged associates: Mohd Aswadi Mat Zain and Lim Kok Han. The article was originally published on 26 October 2021.

She claimed that Azam's brothers, Nasir and Radzuan, became increasingly involved in numerous businesses as Azam rose to the top. According to the article, Azam was a shareholder in Gets Global Berhad. He had 1,930,000 shares as of 30 April 2015, and 1,029,500 shares as of 31 March 2016. In March 2016, he was in possession of 2,156,000 warrants in Excel Force MSC Berhad. The other individuals mentioned in the article also held the same shares and warrants during the same period as Azam. The author concluded that Azam Baki's brothers and associates control a conglomerate. She further added that when top law enforcement officers or their family members are involved in a variety of businesses, a conflict of interest arises, which can lead to abuse of power and corruption.

On 14 December 2021, Sungai Buloh MP Sivarasa Rasiah asked parliament to discuss the allegation that Azam Baki owned shares in two companies listed on the exchange in excess of the amount allowed.

==== Edmund Terence Gomez's resignation ====
On 27 December 2021, one of the MACC Consultation and Corruption Prevention Panel member, Edmund Terence Gomez has resigned in protest of its inaction against Azam's stock ownership allegation. Gomez said that he had written three times to the panel's chairman, Borhan Dollah, requesting that a meeting be held as soon as November to discuss the matter. Despite the fact that Borhan initially responded immediately and agreed to a meeting, it never took place. Gomez stated that he had also written to the chairman of the MACC Anti-Corruption Advisory Board (ACAB), Abu Zahar Ujang, on three occasions, but had received no response.

==== MACC's press conference ====
On 5 January 2022, MACC held a press conference. The Anti-Corruption Advisory Board (ACAB) chairman, Abu Zahar Ujang, claimed that they are satisfied with the explanation by Azam regarding the alleged ownership of shares in excessive amounts.

During a meeting [on 24 November 2021], Azam had explained the situation to [the ACAB members] that his share account was then used by his brother, Nasir Baki to buy related shares in 2015, in which he does not have any interest in the purchase or ownership of the shares. At the same time, the purchase of the shares was made on the open stock market and there was no conflict of interest for the purchase of the shares in 2015. However, he said that all the shares had been transferred back to Nasir in the relevant year. After a lengthy discussion, the ACAB members are of the opinion that Azam has no interest in the shares.

— Abu Zahar Ujang, 6 January 2022

Abu Zahar further added that there is no need to convene a Royal Commission of Inquiry (RCI) to look into the allegations levelled against Azam. However, he will hand over the decision to the Prime Minister, Ismail Sabri Yaakob, if he wants the investigation to continue by setting up the RCI.

Azam Baki stated at the same press conference that he believes he did not commit any offence and thus does not need to respond to the allegations levelled against him. He also denied that his brother's purchase of shares created a conflict of interest.

When pressed to explain why his brother had to use someone else's name to acquire the shares, Azam stated that it was not an issue. In fact, Azam challenged the dissatisfied parties to prove that the action was a violation of the law. Azam also claimed that the allegation that he controlled many companies was a 'total lie' that was purposefully created to cast a negative light on him. He added that the accusation was portrayed as if he controlled a large conglomerate to tarnish his reputation as the Chief Commissioner and MACC as a whole.

==== Criticism by Ideas ====
In a statement issued on 5 January 2022, Malaysian think tank, Institute for Democracy and Economic Affairs (Ideas) welcomed the ACAB's decision to respond publicly to the allegations, but they called for additional action to investigate the allegations against Azam. According to Ideas, ACAB chairman Abu Zahar Ujang's statement did not fully address public concerns about the MACC's integrity.

Ideas urged the ACAB to reveal the process used to clear Azam's name of any wrongdoing, as well as whether Azam met the property declaration criteria based on government circulars requiring civil servants to declare their property. Ideas stated that if the decision to release Azam was made solely on Azam's explanation in a single meeting without a thorough investigation, then ACAB was not doing its job properly, and it should not happen in an organisation tasked with overseeing the MACC.

==== Securities Commission Malaysia investigated Azam Baki ====
On 6 January 2022, the Securities Commission Malaysia (SC) said it would speak to Azam after he admitted that his brother had used the name of his trading account to buy shares. The SC informed that under Section 25 of the Central Depository Securities Industry Act 1991 (Sicda), every securities account opened with a central depository must be in the name of the beneficial owner of the shares deposited or in the name of a company authorized by the nominee.

==== Criticism by Edmund Terence Gomez ====
On the same day, Edmund Terence Gomez claimed that the statements of both Azam and Abu Zahar raised more questions than answers and raised 'extremely distressing new concerns' regarding Azam's business interests. He said many expected a clearer answer from Abu Zahar on the serious allegations against Azam regarding the ownership of shares worth millions of ringgit. Gomez said the statements of the two also raised three core questions. "Is the administration in the MACC so weak? Can the advisory board act fairly and appropriately when dealing with serious allegations of impropriety by senior MACC officers? Has Azam's answer raised new legal and regulatory questions about the importance of his business?"

==== Azam demanded apology from Lalitha ====
Azam Baki has demanded a public apology and RM10 million from Lalitha Kunaratnam in Azam's stock trading scandal for alleged defamation. Lalitha was served with a demand letter, which also requested the removal of two articles titled "Business ties among MACC leadership: How deep does it go? (Part 1)" and "Business ties among MACC leadership: How deep does it go (Part 2)." Azam gave Lalitha 14 days to comply or he would file defamation charges against her. Edmund Terence Gomez referred to Azam's letter of demand as an act of intimidation, advising him to withdraw the notice immediately because Lalitha had raised a legitimate issue of national interest.

==== Other ACAB member denied the stance of its chairman ====
On 8 January 2022, all ACAB member except Abu Zahar Ujang denied the stance expressed by the chairman of the board, Abu Zahar, on the controversy. Instead, they said, Abu Zahar's statement in the press conference was entirely the personal stand himself. The statement was issued jointly by six ACAB member, namely Ismail Omar, Azman Ujang, Akhbar Satar, Hamzah Kassim, David Chua Kok Tee and Mohammad Agus Yusoff. They added that before the press conference, the board members had a separate discussion with Abu Zahar. In the discussion they said, it was proposed that the matter be referred either to an independent committee; Parliamentary Select Committee (PSC) on corruption; or the MACC Complaints Committee panel.

==== Comment by the Prime Minister ====
On the same day, Prime Minister, Ismail Sabri Yaakob stated that further action is being taken by the relevant parties and he believes, the problem will be resolved. At the same time, he stressed the need to be fair to all parties by making decisions after the completion of the investigation procedure. Ismail Sabri explained that the MACC itself was originally the Anti-Corruption Agency (ACA) and was later placed under a commission so that there would be no interference by the government. When asked why Azam was not rested while the investigation was carried out, Ismail Sabri stressed that there should be no favoritism in this issue.

==== Supports by the deputy commissioners ====
On 9 January 2022, three MACC deputy commissioners have declared their support for Azam, who is currently facing an ongoing investigation following allegations of share ownership. The statement claimed that three deputies' statement "represents all of the MACC member". The three of Azam deputies, Ahmad Khusairi Yahaya (operations), Norazlan Mohd Razali (prevention) and Junipah Wandi (management and professionalism) denied the allegations against Azam and described it as an attack on MACC.

==== Defamation suit retracted by Azam ====
On 11 June 2024, Azam's solicitors filed a withdrawal note and withdrew his defamation suit against Lalitha Kunaratnam on 21 June 2024.

=== Abuse of power ===
==== Bloomberg report ====
On 12 February 2026, a report made by Bloomberg alleged that the Chief Commissioner of the Malaysian Anti-Corruption Commission (MACC), Azam Baki, is working with businessmen to take over companies. This has caused protests in Kuala Lumpur calling for his arrest for alleged abuse of power that took place in his commission.

==== Defamation suit against Bloomberg ====
Azam Baki denied any wrongdoing. He sent a Letter of Demand (LOD) to Bloomberg calling the report "malicious and misleading" and is seeking 100 million Ringgit ($25.7 million USD) in damages.

== Honours ==
=== Honours of Malaysia ===
- Malaysia
  - Commander of the Order of Loyalty to the Crown of Malaysia (PSM) – Tan Sri (2021)
  - Commander of the Order of Meritorious Service (PJN) – Datuk (2017)
  - Member of the Order of the Defender of the Realm (AMN) (2009)
- Federal Territory (Malaysia)
  - Grand Commander of the Order of the Territorial Crown (SMW) – Datuk Seri (2018)
- Kelantan
  - Knight Grand Commander of the Order of Loyalty to the Crown of Kelantan (SPSK) – Dato' (2022)
- Malacca
  - Companion Class I of the Exalted Order of Malacca (DMSM) – Datuk (2013)
- Pahang
  - Knight Grand Companion of the Order of Sultan Ahmad Shah of Pahang (SSAP) – Dato' Sri (2014)
  - Knight Companion of the Order of Sultan Ahmad Shah of Pahang (DSAP) – Dato' (2013)
  - Knight Companion of the Order of the Crown of Pahang (DIMP) – Dato' (2011)
  - Member of the Order of Sultan Ahmad Shah of Pahang (AAP) (2008)
- Sabah
  - Grand Commander of the Order of Kinabalu (SPDK) – Datuk Seri Panglima (2022)
- Sarawak
  - Knight Commander of the Order of the Star of Sarawak (PNBS) – Dato Sri (2023)
