= 1MDB =

Insolvent development company of Malaysia

1Malaysia Development Berhad
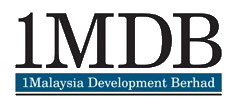
- Formerly: Terengganu Investment Authority
- Type: State-owned enterprise
- Industry: Strategic development
- Founded: 25 June 2009; 17 years ago
- Headquarters: Menara IMC, No 8 Jalan Sultan Ismail, Kuala Lumpur, Malaysia
- Key people: Asri Hamidon (Chairman)
- Revenue: Non-disclosed
- Owner: Minister of Finance (Incorporated)
- Website: www.1mdb.com.my

1Malaysia Development Berhad (1MDB) is an insolvent Malaysian strategic development company, wholly owned by the Minister of Finance (Incorporated).

In 2015, the company became the subject of a major international corruption scandal, with evidence pointing to money laundering, fraud, and theft. A lawsuit filed by United States Department of Justice (DOJ), alleged that at least US$3.5 billion has been stolen from Malaysia's 1MDB state-owned fund. US attorney general Jeff Sessions had described it in an international conference as "kleptocracy at its worst". In September 2020, the alleged amount stolen had been raised to US$4.5 billion and a Malaysian government report listed 1MDB's outstanding debts to be at US$7.8 billion. The scandal implicated Malaysian prime minister Najib Razak, contributing to the 2018 election loss of his party and his eventual trial and imprisonment.

As of 6 August 2022, in an ongoing effort to fight global kleptocracy, the U.S. Department of Justice recovered and returned a total of US$1.2 billion of 1MDB funds misappropriated within U.S. jurisdiction to the people of Malaysia, joining a list of several countries which have initiated recovery or that have already repatriated smaller recovered amounts.

== History ==
1Malaysia Development Berhad (1MDB) started off as Terengganu Investment Authority (TIA) which was initiated by the Menteri Besar of Terengganu at the time, Ahmad Said in 2008. TIA was a sovereign wealth fund with an initial fund of RM11 billion (US$3.25 billion in 2008) aimed at ensuring the economic development of Terengganu state. The fund's purpose was to ensure a long-term sustainable development while safeguarding the economic well-being of Terengganu residents. The TIA fund was derived from outstanding royalty income of RM6 billion and funds from bond issued by local and overseas financial markets. In addition, the Federal Government had proposed to provide a guarantee of RM5 billion based on Terengganu's future oil revenues.

On 27 May 2009, Ismee Ismail and Shahrol Azral Ibrahim Halmi signed a deal arranged by AmInvestment Bank Bhd to raise RM5 billion via the issuance of Islamic medium term notes (IMTNs), despite being told not to do so by the Terengganu state government. This exercise was advised by TIA's special advisor, Jho Low. On 29 May 2009, TIA received RM4.385 billion in net proceeds from IMTN from the full value of RM5 billion.

On 31 July 2009, Minister of Finance (Incorporated) (MOFI) took over TIA and amended its name to 1Malaysia Development Bhd (1MDB). This acquisition by MOFI took place four months after Najib Razak became the Prime Minister of Malaysia. In his announcement on 22 July 2009, Najib said the decision to expand TIA into a federal entity was made to enable its benefits to reach a broader spectrum of Malaysians rather than the residents of only one state.

In general, 1MDB investments can be summarized as:

- Investment in PetroSaudi Holdings (Cayman) Ltd
- Investment in Segregated Portfolio Company (SPC)
- Investment in SRC Group
- Investment in real estate sector
- Investment in the energy sector

On 10 March 2015, Auditor General of Malaysia under the mandate of the Cabinet and the Public Accounts Committee (PAC) was assigned to audit the financial statements of the 1MDB Group and to evaluate whether the financial performance and activities of the 1MDB Group are aligned with the company's original objectives. However, on 4 March 2016, the audit report produced by the Auditor General of Malaysia was classified as Official Secrets Act under the Official Secrets Act 1972 by the National Security Council.

After the victory of Pakatan Harapan in the 14th general election in Malaysia, the audit report was declassified. The declassification was made on 15 May 2018 at the request of the seventh Prime Minister of Malaysia, Mahathir Mohamad.

On 23 May 2018, the newly appointed Minister of Finance, Lim Guan Eng, appointed PricewaterhouseCoopers to review and perform an audit of 1MDB. This followed revelations by directors of 1MDB that the company was insolvent and unable to repay its debts. On 28 June 2018, the president and chief executive officer, Arul Kanda Kandasamy was sacked for dereliction of duty.

In 2024, firms and liquidators that were linked to the 1MDB corporate scandal were put into Chapter 15 bankruptcy as they are currently looking to recover assets.

== Investments ==
=== PetroSaudi Holdings (Cayman) Ltd ===
On 28 September 2009, 1MDB established a joint venture (JV) with PetroSaudi Holdings (Cayman) Ltd; the company name was 1MDB-PetroSaudi Ltd with a 60:41 ratio where 1MDB held 41% with a cash contribution of US$1 billion while PetroSaudi Holdings contributed with assets of at least US$1.6 billion. There were four different companies registered under the name of PetroSaudi, but the investment proposals submitted to the board of directors of 1MDB failed to state that.

On 29 September 2009 (a day after formation of joint venture), Edward L. Morse submitted an asset valuation report on the same day he was appointed by the 1MDB chief executive officer. The assessment report takes into account assets in oil exploration and production rights in Turkmenistan and Argentina. The assessment was implemented on PetroSaudi International Ltd's assets despite the JV agreement clearly stating that the company owning all the rights and interests of the agreed assets for the joint venture project is PetroSaudi International Cayman, the report said.

Besides that, the JV agreement lacked clauses to guard the interests of the company. Among others, there was an advance of US$700 million in fees to 1MDB-PetroSaudi from PetroSaudi Holdings to be fully repayable on or before 30 September 2009. On 30 September 2009, a total of US$1 billion (RM3.487 billion) was transferred by 1MDB into two separate accounts. The first US$300 million was transferred into joint venture account, and the remaining US$700 million was transferred into another company's account, (Good Star Ltd, a PetroSaudi subsidiary), with the aim of repaying the advance taken by the joint venture company. However, approval by the board of 1MDB was not obtained for the payment of US$700 million into a non-joint-venture account.

In March 2010, about six months after the formation of joint venture of 1MDB-PetroSaudi, 1MDB disposed all the 40% stake (worth US$1 billion) for US$1.2 billion in Murabahah Note. Murabahah Notes are guaranteed by corporate guarantee, PetroSaudi International Ltd. On the other hand, 1MDB made an additional subscription to this Murabahah Notes up to additional US$830 million with partly funded via loans from financial institutions.

On 1 June 2012, 27 months after holding on this Murabahah Notes, 1MDB redeemed all of the Murabahah Notes with a total of US$2.22 billion including profits. This redemption of US$2.22 billion was done via an asset swap arrangement where 1MDB International Holdings Ltd (1MDB-IHL), a 1MDB subsidiary received 49% equity stake in PetroSaudi Oil Services Ltd (PSOSL), a PetroSaudi International Ltd subsidiary. This exercise raised a question in the auditor-general's audit report where the conversion of Murabahah Notes to equity investments in PSOSL was done without any study to identify PSOSL liabilities, the ability to generate funds, and past financial performance. The 1MDB board was aware that PSOSL operates in Venezuelan waters where sanctions have been imposed by the United States and ending drilling contracts, but the decision to invest in PSOSL proceeded despite such conditions. The documents were signed by 1MDB's CEO on 1 June 2012, long before obtaining the approval of 1MDB board on 20 June 2012.

During mid-July 2012, 45 days after the investment in PSOSL equities on 1 June 2012, 1MDB disposed all 49% equity in PSOSL to Bridge Partners International Investment Ltd (Bridge Partners) for a minimum of US$2.2 billion at the suggestion of 1MDB's CEO. The sale was done on 12 September 2012 and Bridge Partners issued six non-interest bearing promissory notes worth US$2.318 billion.

These promissory notes were further used as an investment in segregated portfolio company (SPC).

=== Segregated portfolio company (SPC) ===
On 12 September 2012, Brazen Sky Ltd (a subsidiary of 1MDB), entered into an investment management agreement with Bridge Global Absolute Return Fund SPC (Bridge Global SPC) and Bridge Partners Investment Management (Cayman) Ltd. to invest US$2.318 billion funded by the promissory notes from PSOSL sales. The investment involved various portfolio investments in the segregated portfolio company of the Cayman Islands. However, the company in charge of this investment, Bridge Global Absolute Return Fund SPC (Bridge Global SPC), was a new month-old company with no fund management licence nor experience in managing large funds.

On 20 May 2013, 1MDB's board of directors redeemed the investment gradually which would improve perceptions of the funds's credibility. As of 20 December 2014, the total redeemed from the SPC fund was US$1.39 billion out of US2.318 billion and the balance of US$939.87 was to be fully redeemed by the end of December. The US$1.39 billion was transferred into Brazen Sky's bank account and then transferred into 1MDB Global Investment Ltd (1MDB-GIL) account. The SPC funds with a booked value of US$2.318 was pledged to Deutsche Bank for a loan amount of US$975 million without the approval of 1MDB's board. From the proceeds of initial redemption and with Deutsche Bank loan, some US$993 million was used for the payment of the Aabar option termination (though originally the settlement agreement was only US$300 million instead of US$993 million). The Aabar option was an option given to Aabar Ltd in exchange of a guarantee of Abu Dhabi's International Petroleum Investment Co (IPIC) to give 1MDB a total of US$3.5 billion in bond issuances via Goldman Sachs. All of these actions raised questions as they were not consistent with the initial objective of bringing the SPC portfolio back to Malaysia.

=== SRC Group ===
1MDB established SRC International Sdn Bhd (SRC) on 7 January 2011. According to the SRC Business Plan for the period of 2011 to 2015, SRC will supply coal for long-term needs of national by the fourth year of operation (in 2014).

SRC obtains funding from government grants in the form of development grants of RM15 million out of RM20 million that were approved by the Economic Planning Unit (EPU) and RM2 billion financing from the Retirement Fund Incorporation (KWAP). Financing amounting of RM2 billion from KWAP was received on 29 August 2011 with a term of financing of 10 years. The loan is guaranteed by the government which includes principal and financing benefits of RM2.902 billion.

On 3 November 2011, SRC (via subsidiary company SRC International (Malaysia) Limited, SRCI) establish a joint venture with Aabar Investments PJS (Aabar) with the name of Aabar-SRC Strategic Resources Limited (ASRC). The initial paid-up capital was US$120 million with each party contribute US$60 million.

The board of directors of SRCI approved a US$45.50 million investment in the coal industry at Mongolia but this investment was questioned as this investment was done without any evidence showing any feasibility studies done on the status of the project. The mentioned project was undertaken by the joint venture of ASRC with the Gobi Coal & Energy Limited (GCE) company.

SRC also invested in PT ABM Investama TBK, that operates in the energy resources, energy services, and energy infrastructure sectors in Indonesia up to US$120 million (RM366.68 million) through published share prices listed on the Indonesia Stock Exchange.

During the meeting on 14 February 2012, CEO of SRC reported an estimated profit on the investment amounting to US$4 million.

On 15 February 2012, SRC's shareholding by 1MDB was transferred to the Ministry of Finance Incorporation (MOFI) by way of acquisition of shares through interim dividend-in-specie payments. The transfer of SRC shares has reduced the operating losses of the 1MDB Group from RM25 million to RM16.2 million, lowering the gearing ratio of 1MDB from 12 times to 9.5 times and reducing the government's total guarantee of RM2.902 billion to the 1MDB Group.

=== Real estate ===
1MDB invested into real estate market with the aim of diversification and aim to generate long-term return on investment. From 2010 until September 2015, 1MDB have acquired five different property assets with the acquisition amounting to RM2.111 billion. The land are:-

- Tun Razak Exchange (TRX) project land
- Bandar Malaysia project land
- land in Air Itam, Penang
- land in Alor Gajah, Melaka
- land in Pulau Indah, Selangor

=== Tun Razak Exchange ===
On 21 May 2010, it was reported that 1MDB will jointly develop the Tun Razak Exchange project at a currently vacant piece of land covering 34.4 hectares in the city of Kuala Lumpur with Mubadala Development Company. The Tun Razak Exchange was launched on 30 July 2012 by Najib Razak. During his speech on Tenth Malaysia Plan, Najib identified the KL International Financial District (KLIFD) and Bandar Malaysia projects as two of many public–private partnership projects which will help drive the nation's transformation agenda.

Tun Razak Exchange (TRX) project land was acquired with the price of RM302.8 million. A joint venture agreement between 1MDB and Aabar Investments PJS (Aabar) was signed on 12 March 2013. However, the development of the TRX project in collaboration with Aabar was not realized and impacted on the rest of the project.

Up to September 2015, five plots of lands of TRX were sold at RM1.358 billion in fund raising efforts for the 1MDB Group while remaining eleven plots of land plan to sell for RM2.592 billion. Besides that, 1MDB Group also construct a building in a joint venture with Mulia Group, namely Exchange 106 (formerly TRX Signature Tower) to be leased to an international financial services institution for 15 years from 2019 to 2033 with an estimated return of RM537.38 million.

In order to fund the TRX project infrastructure development, 1MDB subsidiary, 1MDB Real Estate Sdn Bhd (1MDB RE, but now known as TRX City Sdn Bhd) relies entirely on the sale of land plots. Besides that, 1MDB also created a special-purpose vehicle (SPV) raised about Rm229.50 million in August 2015 for fund raising. The TRX project is expected to face negative cash flows as the project receipts are insufficient to cover infrastructure and construction costs and worse still some money from the plots sales, i.e. RM1.095 billion and SPV fund has been flow back to 1MDB instead of using it to finance the TRX project development cost.

=== Bandar Malaysia ===
Bandar Malaysia is a 26-year-long-run project. It was acquired by 1MDB with the cost of RM368.72 million with additional cost of RM2.717 billion (partly funded by Government for RM1.117 billion) for the reallocation of the current Sungai Besi Airport which act as Royal Malaysian Air Force (RMAF) airbase to eight new locations, the biggest in Sendayan, Negeri Sembilan. However, 1MDB has used part of the allocation (RM288 million) from Government allocation to pay 1MDB debt and not used accordingly to the original purpose of the allocation.

On 13 May 2010, 1MDB as part of a consortium of companies, will jointly undertake redevelopment project of Sungai Besi Airport at Sungai Besi, an old international airport, which is now the base for the RMAF into a GDV of RM150 billion Bandar Malaysia. The site covers 486 acres and is planned to be developed into an Islamic financial centre and will include Qatar Investment Authority (QIA) as a partner. About the same time, 1MDB and QIA had signed an MOU to assess the viability of energy and real estate investments. In the MOU, QIA also proposed to invest US$5 billion.

The Sungai Airport relocation phase should be completed by 2016 while the whole of Bandar Malaysia to be completed by 2040. Perbadanan Perwira Harta Malaysia (PPHM), a subsidiary of Armed Forces Fund Board Malaysia (or also known as Lembaga Tabung Angkatan Tentera (LTAT)) has been appointed as the main contractor for the RMAF base relocation project. As of August 2015, five out of eight supposed relocation sites have been late. The reasoning was a delay in submission of the area, suspension of approvals from local authorities, delays in consumer authentication, weather conditions, and flash floods in November and December 2014.

Besides that, the arrears amounting to RM396.42 million to PPHM until September 2015 also affected the progress of the construction site. This is because a total of RM1.926 billion (51.3%) of loans and sukuk amounting to RM3.75 billion was raised which was supposed to be used for financing both the reallocation of Sungai Besi Airport and the development of Bandar Malaysia was transferred back to 1MDB.

In line with the 1MDB Group rationalization plan, on 31 December 2015, 1MDB announced the sale of 60% equity in Bandar Malaysia Sdn. Bhd. to the consortium of Iskandar Waterfront Holdings (IWH) and China Railway Engineering Corporation (CREC) with a 60:40 ratio. The IWH-CREC Consortium has valued 100 percent of Bandar Malaysia's land at RM12.35 billion where the value of 60% of the land is RM7.41 billion. This transaction is expected to be completed by June 2016. However, the deal collapsed on 3 May 2017 due to failure to meet payment obligations, announced by Ministry of Finance of Malaysia (who owned 1MDB).

=== Air Itam land ===
Air Itam's land was acquired with the main development of affordable housing in Penang. About 85.7% of land already owned by 1MDB through the acquisition of two companies, Gerak Indera and Farlim Properties (FPSB) with a total price of RM1.056 billion (and related expenses of RM15.25 million). However, the remaining 14.3% ownership of the land has not yet to be finalized. Development of the land is also difficult to implement as full support of the State Government is not obtained and the problem of land occupied by almost 2,000 squatters are still unsolved.

=== Pulau Indah land ===
Pulau Indahland was purchased under the consideration of intention to expand the energy sector. The land was purchase at a price of RM344.24 from Tadmax Power Sdn Bhd with a land size of 318.41 acres. Initially, the land was supposed to be used for the development of Project 3B (a power plant development) but the project eventually implemented in Port Dickson, Negeri Sembilan due to the land is not suitable for the development of power plant. In July 2015, the land up for sale from 1MDB as part of the rationalization plan but until today the land yet to be sold to any party.

=== Energy sector ===
In the early stage of 1MDB formation in 2009, 1MDB has embarked on a move in energy sector investment through joint venture with China and Qatar in:

- Aluminium smelting in Sarawak that uses energy sources from Bakun Hydroelectric
- Investment in GDF Suez SA equities (a French multinational electric utility company)
- Construction proposals re-gasification and gas-based power plant

However, the initial investment fell off due to lack of energy resources and also the government policy that did not allow any other party other than Petronas to supply gas to independent power producer (IPP).

On 11 January 2010, 1MDB signed a co-operation framework agreement with the State Grid Corporation of China (SGCC), with the intention of undertaking various energy-based projects in the Sarawak Corridor of Renewable Energy (SCORE) and subsequently become major investors in SCORE.

On 18 January 2010, 1MDB signed a co-operation agreement with Abu Dhabi Future Energy Company (also known as Masdar) to explore clean technology projects and investments, including the possibility of building Malaysia's first carbon-neutral city.

In November 2015, the company agreed to sell its energy assets, worth around $2.3 billion, to China General Nuclear Power Group and its subsidiaries.

== Corporate structure ==
1MDB has a three-tier check-and-balance system comprising a board of advisors, a board of directors and a senior management team. The board of advisors is chaired by Najib Razak himself. From 2010 until 2013, the board of advisors included the CEO of LVMH, Bernard Arnault.

In early March 2015, with public discontent growing at the perceived lack of financial transparency at 1MDB, Najib, who is also the chairman of 1MDB's board of advisors, ordered the Auditor General of Malaysia to carry out an audit of 1MDB. However, on completion of the audit, the auditor general's final report was classified as an Official Secret for only the eyes of the Public Accounts Committee (PAC) tasked to investigate improprieties at 1MDB.

It was later found that 1MDB has only one employee since the beginning of 2018—CEO Arul Kanda, and he was on "garden leave" until the end of his contract in June 2018.

== Scandal ==
The involvement of 1MDB in the multi-billion-ringgit Tun Razak Exchange development project drew criticism from the opposition within a year of commencement. Opposition leader and Member of Parliament of Permatang Pauh, Anwar Ibrahim, questioned the credentials of the company. He informed Parliament that according to the records held by the companies commission, 1MDB "had no business address and no appointed auditor." Anwar further questioned the then-current Prime Minister, Najib Razak, regarding his role in getting 1MDB involved in the Tun Razak Exchange project.

1MDB's RM425 million (US$140 million) profit between 25 September 2009 and 31 March 2010 raised questions about the lack of transparency of 1MDB's accounting. Tony Pua, DAP Member of Parliament for Petaling Jaya Utara questioned former Prime Minister Najib Razak, who was also 1MDB's advisory board chairman, as to whether the figures were the result of asset injections into 1MDB by the government, such as the transfer of land rights to the company.

During the October 2010 parliamentary session, 1MDB explained that its accounts had been fully audited and signed by KPMG, and closed as of 31 March 2010. Deloitte was involved in the valuation and analysis of the portfolio, while Ernst & Young provided tax advice for 1MDB. The company also informed that it had lodged the necessary information, including providing a registered address, with the Companies Commission of Malaysia (CCM) as required by the law. The registration information was made available on the company's website.

During 2013, 1MDB was in the spotlight again when it applied for a six-month extension for the publication of its annual report that was supposed to be filed with the CCM by 30 September 2013. In the meantime, the change of auditors three times in the four years since its inception in 2009 was widely considered suspicious.

By mid-2015, with 1MDB's accumulated debts totalling RM42 billion (US$12 billion), bonds issued by the fund were downgraded to junk status by the major rating agencies such as Standard & Poor's and Fitch Ratings. The Malaysian cabinet rejected a RM3 billion ($US1 billion) cash injection, narrowing 1MDB's options to repay its debts on time.

In 2015, allegations were made in several newspapers, including The Wall Street Journal, mentioned that the 1MDB organisation had been used to steal state funds for transfer into the accounts of former Prime Minister Najib Razak, and people associated with him such as Jho Low.

In August 2015, the Malaysian Anti-Corruption Commission (MACC) had confirmed that no funds from 1MDB were transferred to the Prime Minister's private accounts as alleged by The Wall Street Journal. Following, 1MDB's president and group executive director (CEO), Arul Kanda, appeared in a local TV programme to clarify issues and allegations against 1MDB and also appeared in an interview with BFM 89.9 with host Ibrahim Sani and mentioned that 1MDB has been cleared of any and all wrongdoing by the Malaysian Attorney General.

In media interviews in September 2015, 1MDB said some media reports concerning the company appear to be politically motivated. Its president and group executive director, Arul Kanda, also clarified that none of the company's accounts in Singapore have been frozen, rebutting news reports on the matter. The company has also dismissed claims of wrongdoing.

In February 2016, Federal Bureau of Investigation (FBI) of the United States began probing the connection between a regional top executive of global investment bank Goldman Sachs with former Prime Minister Najib Razak and the nature of the former's involvement in multibillion-dollar deals with 1MDB. Similar probes have also taken place or are currently undergoing in the United Kingdom, Australia, Hong Kong and Singapore into banks that facilitated transactions for 1MDB.

In May 2016, the Public Accounts Committee (PAC) of the Malaysian Parliament; consisting of several members of the parliament from both the ruling party and the opposition laid the blame for the troubles of 1MDB on the board of the troubled state fund and its former chief, saying that the board had failed to carry out its responsibilities.

In May 2018, after the formation of the new Cabinet following Pakatan Harapan's victory in the general election, Finance Minister Lim Guan Eng has ordered the appointment of PricewaterhouseCoopers to conduct a special position audit and review of 1MDB.

On 28 July 2020, the High Court convicted former Prime Minister of Malaysia, Najib Razak on all seven counts of abuse of power, money laundering and criminal breach of trust, becoming the first Prime Minister of Malaysia to be convicted of corruption, and was sentenced to 12 years' imprisonment and fined RM210 million.

On 7 February 2021, the British National Crime Agency served a warrant against the London law firm Clyde & Co on behalf of the United States Department of Justice seeking the recovery of US$330 million (£243 million). These funds are reportedly held in a bank account at a NatWest branch in London. The Department of Justice has alleged that the funds are what remains of the proceeds of the first phase of the 1MDB fraud, which allegedly misappropriated US$1 billion of 1MDB funds.

On 9 February 2021, the Malaysian Government filed a lawsuit against Jho Low's former associates and former senior 1MBD officials Jasmine Loo and Casey Tang, seeking the recovery of RM 9.3 million in tax arrears. The two fugitives are wanted in Malaysia by authorities for investigations into the 1MDB fraud.

On 8 April 2022, former Goldman Sachs banker Roger Ng was convicted by a US jury of corruption charges related to his role in helping loot hundreds of millions of dollars from Malaysia's 1MDB development fund.

On 23 August 2022, Najib began serving a 12-year sentence in Kajang Prison for his role in the 1MDB scandal, after failing his final appeal at the Federal Court of Malaysia.

During an investigation into the 1MDB scandal, the then-UAE crown prince, Mohammed Bin Zayed, was asked to donate money by Najib.

== Legal actions and recovery efforts ==
In December 2024, 1Malaysia Development Berhad (1MDB) initiated a legal claim against Amicorp Group for $1 billion, alleging the company's involvement in fraudulent activities related to the misappropriation of funds from the state investment fund.

=== Key details of the legal claim ===
- Allegations: 1MDB accuses Amicorp Group of facilitating the creation and management of shell companies that were used to divert funds from the investment fund.
- The lawsuit is part of Malaysia's broader efforts to recover assets lost in the extensive 1MDB scandal, which has drawn international attention and scrutiny.
- In response to the lawsuit, Amicorp Group announced its intention to "vigorously dispute" the claims, asserting that it has consistently acted in accordance with applicable laws and regulations.
