= 2024 in Malaysia =

- Decades: 2000s; 2010s; 2020s
- See also: Other events of 2024; History of Malaysia • Timeline • Years

2024 in Malaysia is the 67th anniversary of Malaysia's independence and 61st anniversary of its formation of Malaysia.

== Federal level ==
- Yang di-Pertuan Agong:
  - Al-Sultan Abdullah Ri'ayatuddin Al-Mustafa Billah Shah of Pahang (until 30 January)
  - Sultan Ibrahim of Johor (from 31 January)
- Raja Permaisuri Agong:
  - Tunku Azizah Aminah Maimunah Iskandariah of Pahang (until 30 January)
  - Raja Zarith Sofiah of Johor (from 31 January)
- Deputy Yang di-Pertuan Agong: Sultan Nazrin Muizzuddin Shah of Perak
- Prime Minister: Anwar Ibrahim
- Deputy Prime Ministers: Ahmad Zahid Hamidi and Fadillah Yusof
- President of the Dewan Negara:
  - Wan Junaidi Tuanku Jaafar (until 18 January)
  - Mutang Tagal (from 19 February until 10 May)
  - Awang Bemee Awang Ali Basah (from 22 July)
- Speaker of the Dewan Rakyat: Johari Abdul
- Chief Justice: Tengku Maimun Tuan Mat

== State level ==
- Johor:
  - Sultan of Johor: Tunku Ismail Idris (Regent from 28 January)
  - Menteri Besar of Johor: Onn Hafiz Ghazi
- Kedah:
  - Sultan of Kedah: Sultan Sallehuddin
  - Menteri Besar of Kedah: Muhammad Sanusi Md Nor
- Kelantan:
  - Sultan of Kelantan: Sultan Muhammad V
  - Menteri Besar of Kelantan: Mohd Nassuruddin Daud
- Perlis:
  - Raja of Perlis: Tuanku Syed Sirajuddin
  - Menteri Besar of Perlis: Mohd Shukri Ramli
- Perak:
  - Sultan of Perak: Sultan Nazrin Muizzuddin Shah
  - Menteri Besar of Perak: Saarani Mohammad
- Pahang:
  - Sultan of Pahang: Tengku Hassanal Ibrahim Alam Shah (Regent until 30 January)
  - Menteri Besar of Pahang: Wan Rosdy Wan Ismail
- Selangor:
  - Sultan of Selangor: Sultan Sharafuddin Idris Shah
  - Menteri Besar of Selangor: Amirudin Shari
- Terengganu:
  - Sultan of Terengganu: Sultan Mizan Zainal Abidin
  - Menteri Besar of Terengganu: Ahmad Samsuri Mokhtar
- Negeri Sembilan:
  - Yang di-Pertuan Besar of Negeri Sembilan: Tuanku Muhriz
  - Menteri Besar of Negeri Sembilan: Aminuddin Harun
- Penang:
  - Governor of Penang: Tun Ahmad Fuzi Abdul Razak
  - Chief Minister of Penang: Chow Kon Yeow
- Malacca:
  - Governor of Malacca: Tun Mohd Ali Rustam
  - Chief Minister of Malacca: Ab Rauf Yusoh
- Sarawak:
  - Governor of Sarawak:
    - Tun Abdul Taib Mahmud (until 25 January)
    - Tun Wan Junaidi Tuanku Jaafar (from 26 January)
  - Premier of Sarawak: Amar Abang Johari Abang Openg
- Sabah:
  - Governor of Sabah: Tun Juhar Mahiruddin
  - Chief Minister of Sabah: Hajiji Noor

== Events ==
=== January ===
- 2 January – Prime Minister Anwar Ibrahim launches the Central Database Hub (PADU), which is a system and platform containing individual and household profiles of the citizens and permanent residents. Minister of Transport Anthony Loke announced that the Malaysian motorists would be able to renew their driving licenses and road taxes via the MyJPJ application starting from 1 February.
- 10 January – Merdeka 118 is officially opened by Yang di-Pertuan Agong Al-Sultan Abdullah Ri'ayatuddin Al-Mustafa Billah Shah of Pahang and Raja Permaisuri Agong Tunku Azizah Aminah Maimunah Iskandariah.
- 26 January – Wan Junaidi Tuanku Jaafar is appointed the 8th Governor of Sarawak with immediate effect and conferred the title 'Tun'.
- 28 January – Crown Prince of Johor Tunku Ismail Idris is proclaimed the Regent of Johor.
- 30 January – Sultan of Pahang, Al-Sultan Abdullah Ri'ayatuddin Al-Mustafa Billah Shah of Pahang as the 16th Yang di-Pertuan Agong, departed from Kuala Lumpur after the end of his term, and returned to his state as its ruler.
- 31 January – Sultan of Johor, Sultan Ibrahim of Johor ascends to the throne as the 17th Yang di-Pertuan Agong.

=== February ===
- 2 February – The Pardons Board grants a partial pardon to former Prime Minister Mohammad Najib Abdul Razak who had been jailed in Kajang Prison since 23 August 2022, halving the length of his jail term from 12 to six years and reducing the amount of fine from RM 210,000,000 to RM 50,000,000. Following the pardon, Najib is expected to be released from the prison on 23 August 2028. However, if the fine is not paid, a year would be added to his new jail term.
- 9 February – The Federal Court of Malaysia in a landmark ruling declares several Islamic legislation passed by the State Government of Kelantan as unconstitutional.
- 21 February – Death of Tun Abdul Taib Mahmud:
  - Tun Abdul Taib Mahmud died at 4:40am. He was aged 87.
  - The Sarawak government then declared a period of mourning throughout the state for two days and the state flag of Sarawak was be flown at half-mast.

=== March ===
- 13 March – 2024 Malaysian Allah socks controversy:
  - A pair of socks featuring the word "Allah" for sale at a KK Super Mart in Sunway City, Subang Jaya, Selangor, sparks public controversy.
- 18 March – Former Prime Minister Mahathir Mohamad is discharged from the National Heart Institute after more than two months of undergoing treatment.
- 23 March – Two Singaporean motorcyclists are killed, while four others were seriously injured after a container lorry crashes into their convoy at the North–South Expressway, near Yong Peng, Batu Pahat, Johor.
- 27 March – An Israeli national identified as Shalom Avitan is arrested by police and found with six pistols and 200 rounds of ammunition at a hotel on Jalan Ampang, Kuala Lumpur. The suspect is believed to be associated with a criminal group.

=== April ===
- 14 April – One man is severely injured after another man shoots at his wife at the Kuala Lumpur International Airport in Sepang, Selangor.
- 23 April – 2024 Lumut mid-air collision:
  - Ten people including military personnel, are killed after two Royal Malaysian Navy helicopters collide during rehearsals for a parade near Lumut, Perak.

=== May ===
- 5 May – 2024 Faisal Halim acid attack:
  - Malaysian football player Faisal Halim was attacked with acid at a shopping mall in Kota Damansara, Petaling Jaya.
- 7 May – A tree collapses along Jalan Sultan Ismail, Kuala Lumpur, Malaysia, killing one and injuring two others.
- 11 May – 2024 Kuala Kubu Baharu by-election:
  - Pang Sock Tao of Pakatan Harapan (PH) wins the seat after defeating Khairul Azhari Saut of Perikatan Nasional (PN), independent candidate Eris Nyau Ke Xin and Hafizah Zainuddin of Parti Rakyat Malaysia (PRM) by a majority of 3,869 votes and with 57.21% votes.
- 17 May – 2024 Ulu Tiram police station attack:
  - Two police officers are killed in an attack by a suspected Jemaah Islamiyah militant on a police station in Ulu Tiram, Johor. The attacker is shot dead by police.
- 18 May – Two men are arrested after trying to enter the Istana Negara, Jalan Tuanku Abdul Halim, Kuala Lumpur, Malaysia with a machete.

=== June ===
- 10 June – The government rationalises diesel subsidies by lifting fuel subsidies in Peninsular Malaysia, resulting in a 56% price increase in diesel, from RM 2.15 to RM 3.35 per litre and subsidising only targeted groups RM 200 monthly.
- 13 June – The US embassy announces the return of $156 million in assets linked to the 1MDB scandal to Malaysia following an investigation by the US Department of Justice.
- 14 June – A fire breaks out in a building at the Genting SkyWorlds outdoor theme park in Genting Highlands, Pahang. No casualties are reported.
- 15 June – Two men, one of them involved in nearly 40 offences, are killed in a shoot-out with police outside a suburb of Johor Bahru, Johor.
- 17 June – Prime Minister Anwar Ibrahim announces that the retail prices of Grade A, B and C eggs nationwide have been reduced by 3 cents per egg in the new subsidy initiative. Following this, the new prices of Grade A, B and C eggs are set at 42, 40 and 38 cents per egg respectively.
- 24 June – Authorities announce the arrest of eight people in four states on suspicion of links to Islamic State and plotting against the Yang di-Pertuan Agong Sultan Ibrahim of Johor, Prime Minister Anwar Ibrahim and other leading officials.

=== July ===
- 3 July – A High court dismisses an appeal by former Prime Minister Mohammad Najib Abdul Razak to have his jail sentence for corruption served at home.
- 4 July – At least 39 people are sickened following a gas leak at an aircraft engineering facility in Kuala Lumpur International Airport, Sepang, Selangor
- 6 July – 2024 Sungai Bakap by-election:
  - Abidin Ismail of Perikatan Nasional (PN) wins the seat after defeating Joohari Ariffin of Pakatan Harapan (PH) by a majority of 4,267 votes and with 58.63% of the votes.
- 20 July – The Installation of 17th Yang di-Pertuan Agong Sultan Ibrahim, Sultan of Johor at Istana Negara, Jalan Tuanku Abdul Halim, Kuala Lumpur, Malaysia.
- 26 July – 11 August – Malaysia at the 2024 Summer Olympics in Paris, France.
- 28 July – Malaysia formally applies to become a member of the BRICS economic bloc and geopolitical organization.
- 30 July – Former Prime Minister Mahathir Mohamad is discharged from the National Heart Institute (IJN) after a two-week stay for treatment of a cough.

=== August ===
- 4 August – Malaysia issues a travel warning urging its citizens to not visit the United Kingdom due to ongoing violent riots.
- 4 August – 2024 Summer Olympics in Paris, France:
  - Malaysian men's doubles, Aaron Chia and Soh Wooi Yik win bronze medal.
- 5 August – 2024 Summer Olympics in Paris, France:
  - Malaysian men's singles, Lee Zii Jia win bronze medal.
- 11 August – 2024 Summer Olympics in Paris, France officially ends with Malaysia getting 2 bronze medals.
- 17–24 August – 2024 Sukma Games in Sarawak.
- 20 August – Former Prime Minister Mohammad Najib Abdul Razak retracts his appeal to recuse a judge from hearing his ongoing RM2.27 billion 1MDB abuse of power and money laundering trial.
- 25 August – The Royal Malaysian Navy vessel KD Pendekar sinks off the coast of Johor after hitting an unidentified underwater object. All 39 sailors on board are rescued.
- 27 August – Former Prime Minister Muhyiddin Yassin is charged with sedition following a 14 August speech in which he questioned then former Yang di-Pertuan Agong Al-Sultan Abdullah Ri'ayatuddin Al-Mustafa Billah Shah's of Pahang decision not to reappoint him as prime minister following the 2022 Malaysian general election.
- 28 August – The Federal Criminal Court of Switzerland convicts two PetroSaudi executives to six and seven years in prison respectively for embezzling more than US$1.8 billion from the Malaysian strategic development firm 1Malaysia Development Berhad.
- 28 August – 8 September – Malaysia at the 2024 Summer Paralympics in Paris, France.

=== September ===
- 2 September – 2024 Summer Paralympics in Paris, France:
  - Cheah Liek Hou wins the first gold medal for Malaysia in the Men's Singles SU5 in Badminton.
  - Eddy Bernard wins the first bronze medal for Malaysia in the Men's 100 m T44 in Athletics.
- 4 September – 2024 Summer Paralympics in Paris, France:
  - Muhammad Ziyad Zolkefli wins the first silver medal for Malaysia in the Men's Singles SU5 in Badminton.
- 6 September – 2024 Summer Paralympics in Paris, France:
  - Bonnie Bunyau Gustin wins the second gold medal for Malaysia in the Men's 72kg in Powerlifting.
- 8 September – 2024 Summer Paralympics in Paris, France:
  - Abdul Latif Romly wins the second silver medal for Malaysia in the Men's long jump T20 in Athletics.
- 8 September – 2024 Summer Paralympics in Paris, France officially ends with Malaysia getting 2 gold, 2 silver and 1 bronze medal.
- 6–14 September – 2024 Sukipt Games in Universiti Utara Malaysia.
- 11 September – Police rescue 402 minors suspected of being sexually abused at Islamic charity homes linked to GISB in Selangor and Negeri Sembilan. Around 171 suspects are arrested.
- 19 September – Nasiruddin Mohd Ali, CEO of GISB Holdings (Global Ikhwan Services and Business), is arrested along with 18 others as part of an investigation into the child sexual abuse case involving GISB.
- 22–28 September – 2024 Para Sukma Games in Sarawak.
- 23 September – Police rescue 187 minors suspected of being sexually abused at Islamic charity homes linked to GISB nationwide.

=== October ===
- 2 October – The Federal Court upholds the death penalty for seven Filipino men who participated in the 2013 Lahad Datu standoff.
- 7 October – Regent of Johor, Tunku Ismail Idris declares to reverse back to Saturday and Sunday as new weekend holidays for the state of Johor which will be re-implemented from 1 January 2025, in contrast to the current Friday and Saturday weekend that was re-implemented for over a decade since 1 January 2014 and prior to that, until 31 December 1993 (together with the state of Perlis on that time).
- 15 October – Former Prime Minister Mahathir Mohamad has been hospitalized at the National Heart Institute in Kuala Lumpur for a respiratory infection.
- 21 October – A court in the Philippines convicts 17 members of the Abu Sayyaf Group, including Rajah Solaiman Movement founder Hilarion Del Rosario Santos III, for their participation in the 2000 Sipadan kidnappings and sentences them to life imprisonment.
- 23 October – Nasiruddin Mohd Ali, CEO of GISB Holdings, along with 22 others including his wife and a son of Ashaari Muhammad, are charged at the Selayang Sessions Court for being members of an organised crime group.
- 24 October – A bus carrying Japanese tourists collides with a truck in Taiping, Perak, killing one person and injuring 12 others.
- 28 October – Former Prime Minister Mahathir Mohamad has been discharged from hospital after being admitted with a respiratory infection.
- 29 October – The Ministry of Finance in a parliamentary disclosure reveals significant losses by Khazanah and PNB in their investments in FashionValet. The announcement sparked public outcry and prompted investigations.

=== November ===
- 2 November – 2024 Malaysian United Indigenous Party leadership election.
- 27 November – The Kuala Lumpur High Court discharges a case of criminal breach of trust against former prime minister Mohammad Najib Abdul Razak over the 1MDB scandal, citing procedural delays. However, the court also allows the filing of six additional cases against Najib and his treasury secretary Mohd Irwan Serigar Abdullah for misappropriating 6.6 billion ringgit ($1.5 billion) in public funds earmarked for 1MDB’s settlement payment to International Petroleum Investment Company of the United Arab Emirates.
- 30 November – At least four people are killed and 122,000 others are displaced following days of flooding in nine states caused by heavy rains.

=== December ===
- 4 December – The kebaya is recognised as part of UNESCO's Intangible Heritage list.
- 12 December – Ahmad Muhaimin and Minbappe win Malaysia's first ever football e-sports record in the FIFAe World Cup after beating Indonesia in the final.
- 15 December – 2024 Penang Bridge International Marathon at Sultan Abdul Halim Muadzam Shah Bridge.
- 19 December – The High Court acquits Rosmah Mansor, the wife of former Prime Minister Mohammad Najib Abdul Razak, of 12 money laundering charges involving RM7 million and five charges of failing to declare her income to the Inland Revenue Board (IRB).
- 20 December – The government agrees to restart the search for Malaysia Airlines Flight MH370.

== National Day and Malaysia Day ==
=== Theme ===
Malaysia MADANI: Jiwa Merdeka (Civilised Malaysia: Independent Soul)

=== National Day parade ===
Putrajaya Square, Persiaran Perdana, Putrajaya

=== Malaysia Day celebration ===
Merdeka Square, Kota Kinabalu, Sabah

== Deaths ==
=== January ===
- 1 January – Fadzilah Abu Hasan, Minister–Counsellor of Economic Affairs at the Embassy of Malaysia in Bangkok, Thailand.
- 3 January – Md Shah Othman, Keyboard player of the bands Kembara and Ilusi.
- 5 January
  - Hamdan Ramli, Senario band member.
  - Nyong Aji, Poet.
- 13 January – Abdullah CD, 2nd Chairman of the Malayan Communist Party.
- 20 January – Devaki Krishnan, The first woman elected to public office and the grandmother of Deputy Minister of Entrepreneur Development and Cooperative Ramanan Ramakrishnan.
- 25 January – Wong Seng Chow, Former Deputy Minister of Transport and veteran of the Malaysian Chinese Association (MCA).

=== February ===
- 21 February – Tun Abdul Taib Mahmud, 4th Chief Minister of Sarawak (1981–2014) and 7th Governor of Sarawak (2014–2024).

=== March ===
- 17 March – Nur Adika Bujang, Bernama journalist based in Sandakan, Sabah.
- 21 March – Lee Kee Hiong, Member of the Selangor State Legislative Assembly (MLA) for Kuala Kubu Baharu, Selangor.

=== April ===
- 3 April – Jaafar Onn, Actor, Singer and Television presenter.
- 17 April – Joseph Kurup, Founder and 1st President of the Parti Bersatu Rakyat Sabah (PBRS).
- 20 April – Mohammed Hanif Omar, 4th Inspector-General of Police (IGP).

=== May ===
- 10 May – Mutang Tagal, 20th President of the Dewan Negara and Senator.
- 24 May – Nor Zamri Latiff, Member of the Penang State Legislative Assembly (MLA) for Sungai Bakap.
- 30 May – Yang Quee Yee, Renowned and influential Malay language scholar and lexicographer in Singapore and Malaysia.

=== June ===
- 8 June – Musa Mohamad, 17th Minister of Education.
- 16 June – Ariah Tengku Ahmad, First female and former Deputy Chief Minister of Sabah and State Minister of Social Services of Sabah.
- 29 June – Syed Husin Ali, Former Deputy President of the People's Justice Party (PKR).

=== July ===
- 11 July – Mohamed Dzaiddin Abdullah, 3rd Chief Justice of Malaysia.
- 26 July
  - Michael Chen Wing Sum, 13th President of the Dewan Negara and former Minister of Housing and Local Government.
  - Siti Zaharah Sulaiman, 4th Minister of National Unity and Community Development.

=== August ===
- 2 August – Sharifah Azizah Syed Zain, Member of the Johor State Legislative Assembly (MLA) for Mahkota, Johor.

=== September ===
- 17 September – Ahmad Mohd Don, 5th Governor of Bank Negara Malaysia.
- 20 September – Eddin Syazlee Shith, Former Deputy Minister and former MP for Kuala Pilah, Negeri Sembilan.

=== October ===
- 15 October – Hiew King Cheu, Former MP for Kota Kinabalu and former MLA for Luyang.
- 19 October – Vadiveloo Govindasamy, 10th President of the Dewan Negara.

=== November ===
- 10 November – Rosnah Abd Majid, Former MLA for Tanjung Dawai, Kedah and first winner for Kinjai awards.
- 13 November
  - Daim Zainuddin, 5th Minister of Finance.
  - Wan Zaki Wan Muda, Founder of Ahmad Zaki Resources Berhad.
- 15 November – Ibrahim Saad, Former Deputy Minister of Transport.
- 24 November – Ahmad Nawab, Singer, Composer and Saxophonist.
- 28 November – Ananda Krishnan, Founder of Usaha Tegas Sdn. Bhd.

=== December ===
- 12 December – Muhammad Said Jonit, Former MLA for Mahkota, Johor.

== See also ==
- 2024
- 2023 in Malaysia | 2025 in Malaysia
- History of Malaysia
- List of Malaysian films of 2024
