= 1993 amendments to the Constitution of Malaysia =

To remove legal immunity of royalty

Constitution (Amendment) Act 1993

Parliament of Malaysia
- Long title: An Act to amend the Federal Constitution.
- Citation: Act A848
- Territorial extent: Throughout Malaysia
- Passed by: Dewan Rakyat
- Passed: 19 January 1993
- Passed by: Dewan Negara
- Passed: 20 January 1993
- Royal assent: 22 March 1993
- Vetoed by: Yang di-Pertuan Agong
- Vetoed: 18 February 1993
- Type of veto: Package
- Veto overridden: 10 March 1993
- Commenced: 30 March 1993

Legislative history

Initiating chamber: Dewan Rakyat
- Bill title: Constitution (Amendment) Bill 1993
- Bill citation: D.R. 01/1993
- Introduced by: Mahathir Mohamad - Prime Minister
- First reading: 18 January 1993
- Second reading: 18 January 1993 - 19 January 1993
- Voting summary: 133 voted for; None voted against; 23 abstained
- Committee stage: 19 January 1993
- Third reading: 19 January 1993
- Voting summary: 133 voted for; None voted against; 16 abstained

Revising chamber: Dewan Negara
- Bill title: Constitution (Amendment) Bill 1993
- Bill citation: D.R. 01/1993
- Member(s) in charge: Ghafar Baba - Deputy Prime Minister
- First reading: 20 January 1993
- Second reading: 20 January 1993
- Voting summary: 57 voted for; None voted against; None abstained; 4 absent
- Third reading: 20 January 1993
- Voting summary: 57 voted for; None voted against; None abstained; 4 absent

Final stages
- Reconsidered by the Dewan Rakyat after veto: 8 March - 9 March 1993
- Voting summary: 167 voted for; None voted against; 6 abstained; 7 absent
- Reconsidered by the Dewan Negara after veto: 10 March 1993
- Voting summary: 58 voted for; None voted against; None abstained

Amends
- Federal Constitution of Malaysia

Keywords
- Conference of Rulers, Legal immunity, Monarchies of Malaysia, Sovereign immunity, Yang di-Pertuan Agong, Yang di-Pertua Negeri
- Status: In force

The 1993 amendments to the Constitution of Malaysia, officially known as Constitution (Amendment) Act 1993 (Malay: Akta Perlembagaan (Pindaan) 1993), is a constitutional amendment passed by the Malaysian parliament in order to remove the legal immunity of all Malaysian royalties. These changes include amendments to Articles 32, 38, 42, 63, 72, 181 and Eighth Schedule of the Malaysian Constitution; and insertion of two new Articles, namely Article 33A and Article 182, into the constitution. The amendments went into effect on 30 March 1993. Before the amendments were made, the Constitution granted rulers who have violated the law not to be prosecuted by the criminal court unless he voluntarily wishes to surrender his legal immunity.

The amendments were made at a time when the Malaysian monarchy witnessed a deteriorating relationship with the Malaysian government. During the late-1980s and the early-1990s, a series of controversial incidents involving the rulers cropped up, many of which came into a conflict of interest with several politicians. After two separate assault incidents by the Sultan of Johor and his younger son which occurred in 1992, the government was prompted to take up the initiative to call for the removal of legal immunity. The rulers were extremely unhappy with the government's calls for the removal of legal immunity, and initially dissented with the government. The government used a two-pronged approach of persuasion and coercion to obtain the assent of the rulers for their rulers. The rulers gave their assent for the government's proposals to remove their legal immunity, which was later implemented in March 1993.

By some interpretations, these events leading up to the constitutional amendments were considered to be a constitutional crisis, given that the federal government, who needed the endorsement of the Sultans to implement the law, refused and subsequently led to a brief standoff between both sides. However, in most cases, the events leading up to the constitutional amendment was generally closely identified as a monarchy crisis rather than a constitutional crisis.

== Background incidents ==
=== Gomez Incident ===
In later part of the year, two connected assault incidents involving members of the Johor royal family occurred. The first one occurred on 10 July 1992, when the second son of the Sultan Iskandar, the Sultan of Johor, Tunku Abdul Majid, hit a Perak hockey goalkeeper, Mohamed Jaafar shortly after a hockey championship match between Perak and Johor, supposedly having lost his temper when the Perak team won the match by a penalty stroke. The goalkeeper made a police report soon afterward which received attention from Parliament who pressured the Malaysian Hockey Confederation to issue Tunku Majid on 18 October 1992, a ban of five years participation in any national hockey tournaments. The Sultan, enraged by the decision issued to his son, exerted pressure on the state education department to issue orders to school hockey teams in Johor to boycott participation in national tournaments. The decision upset Douglas Gomez, a hockey coach, who criticised the education department for destroying the leadership and called for the resignation of all key office bearers of the Johor Hockey Association.

The criticisms by Gomez made the Sultan angry, so he summoned Gomez to the Bukit Serene palace on 30 November, where he was reprimanded and beaten by the Sultan, in front of his dumbstruck bodyguards, who are members of the Johor Military Force (JMF). Gomez, who suffered injuries to his face and stomach, sought treatment at a private clinic the following day and subsequently filed a police report on 6 December, after receiving tacit support from the Malaysian Cabinet. The government-backed media, on its part, was swift to report on the incident.

=== Governmental relations with the Sultan of Kelantan ===
The party leader of Semangat 46, Tengku Razaleigh Tengku Mohd Hamzah, is a member of the Kelantan royal family and was held by high-esteem by the Sultan of Kelantan, Sultan Ismail Petra. Sultan Ismail Petra allegedly campaigned for Semangat 46 during the 1990 Malaysian general elections, which resulted in Semangat 46 as well as its then-coalition partner, the Pan-Malaysian Islamic Party (PAS) wrestling over control of the Kelantan's state government from the Barisan Nasional government. The Prime Minister of Malaysia, Mahathir Mohamad, expressed his unhappiness over the alleged royal support for Semangat 46, and was accused of violating the rule of political neutrality which was required by a constitutional monarch.

In March 1992, customs officials revealed that Sultan Ismail Petra had owed the government RM2.1 million in import duties after he had purchased a convoy of twenty Lamborghini Diablo cars that were directly flown in from London. The Sultan firmly denied any wrongdoings on his part, and further issued a statement declaring support for the implementation of Islamic laws in the state by the PAS-led state government, which angered the BN-led federal government.

== Parliamentary debates and resolutions ==
The press reports on Gomez plight widespread moral outrage within the Malaysian public. A special parliamentary session was held on 10 December 1992 that saw all 96 members of the Dewan Rakyat present unanimously passed a resolution, which condemned Sultan Iskandar for injuring Gomez and declared that the Parliament shall "take all necessary actions" to prevent similar incident from recurring. The subsequent parliamentary session on 27 December saw discussions to remove legal immunity, which agitated Sultan Iskandar to hold a rally to oppose the government's actions, but was forced to cancel after intense government pressure. Members of the opposition party had a passive stance towards the government's proposals, particularly from Semangat 46.

On 6 January 1993, the Malaysian cabinet unanimously approved the draft amendment bill to remove the rulers' immunities. Three days later, the draft bill was presented to the Malay rulers during an informal meeting with prime minister Mahathir Mohamad and other senior UMNO leaders. The rulers in response requested they be given a week to formulate their stand on the proposed bill.

An informal meeting of the Conference of Rulers was held at the National Palace on 16 January, however no decision was made and the meeting was deferred until the next day, although Mahathir, Ghafar Baba, and Anwar Ibrahim were summoned to the palace midway of the meeting. On 17 January the next day, six out of the nine rulers agreed to the government's proposal, and a modified draft was accepted by both parties. Three rulers from Johor, Kedah and Kelantan however were absent from the meeting.

On 18 January, in a twist of event, the Conference of Rulers in a special meeting unanimously decided to withheld consent on the proposed bill, and requested for further deliberation and consultation with the government over the matter. In regards to the proposal of setting up a special court to prosecute the rulers, the Conference through a statement by the Keeper of the Rulers' Seal stated that the special court "is not the most suitable forum for such a purpose", claiming that the implementation of a special court would bring about difficulties in legal technicalities.

The proposed amendments also came with the rule to allow members of parliament and state assemblymen to criticise the Sultans, even the Yang di-Pertuan Agong without fear of the Sedition Act, with the exception of advocating for the abolition of their constitutional position as monarches. In addition, the proposed amendments also sought to limit the power of the rulers to pardon offences of family members. Public criticisms of the rulers was also allowed by amendments to the Sedition Act, which makes it no longer an offence to criticise the royalty except to areas pertaining to their legitimate existence.

Nevertheless, a two-day long special parliamentary sessions starting from 18 January 1993 saw the Dewan Rakyat tabled the proposed amendments in spite of the Sultans' objections, with prime minister Mahathir Mohamad citing as far to say that there was no need to obtain royal assent to enact laws. Back in 1983, the constitution had been amended so that a veto by the Agong can be overridden by a parliamentary vote. On 19 January 1993, shortly before the Dewan Rakyat concluded its session, 133 out of 180 MPs voted in favour the amendment bill while members of the opposition parties abstained from voting, although opposition MPs from DAP and PAS still expressed their support in principle. The following day, Dewan Negara unanimously approved of the proposed amendments.

The three rulers, on the other hand, continued to withhold their consent to the amendments, which saw the government threatening to withdraw the privileges and continued attacks via the national media on instances of royal excesses of their extravagant lifestyles and even hinting a possibility of ending constitutional monarchy in Malaysia, such as the publication of an article of monarchs who abdicated or were disposed since World War II.

On 29 January, the bill was presented to the Yang di-Pertuan Agong for his assent. The Yang di-Pertuan Agong on 18 February however refused assent on the bill, and returned a further amended version of the bill back to parliament for reconsideration. The amended version of the bill was consented by the Conference of Rulers back on 11 February.

The Dewan Rakyat passed the third version of the bill on 9 March 1993, while the Dewan Negara approved the bill on 10 March, the following day. A new chapter, Part XV of the Constitution entitled "Proceedings against the Yang di-Pertuan Agong and the Rulers" was also enshrined.

On 22 March, the bill was finally assented to by the Yang di-Pertuan Agong at the time, Sultan Azlan Shah of Perak. The Act was gazetted on 29 March and the constitutional amendment officially went into effect on 30 March 1993, thereby ending the legal immunity of all Malaysian monarchs.

== Media coverage ==
The government-backed media, on its part, launched a series of reports between 1992 and 1993 detailing alleged misdeeds by members of the royalty not only by the Johor royal family but also on other royal houses from other states, questioning their extravagant lifestyles and misuse of moral authority to gain alleged concessions. The Pahang royal family, in particular, was criticised for the way which they allegedly gained favourable timber forestry concession rates and the unusually high shares which they were accorded in the timber forestry industry.

The views of the Islamic religious leaders were also well publicised, who criticised the royal excesses and even went as far as placing members of the royalty as equal members with the commoners in the eyes of Allah.

In Kelantan, Sultan Ismail Petra was also heavily criticised for failing to pay import duty taxes after he purchased a convoy of imported Italian luxury sports car as well as alleged biased support for Semangat 46 by Dr Mahathir, for violating the constitution which states that monarchs will have to take on a neutral role in political affairs. The leader of Semangat 46, Tengku Razaleigh Tengku Mohd Hamzah was a member of the Kelantan royal family.

== Aftermath ==
Another further constitutional amendment in May 1994 allowed any law that has been passed by both the Dewan Rakyat and Dewan Negara to become law within 30 days, irrespective of whether the Agong had given his assent. The new legislation further reduced the veto power of the Agong — amended previously in 1983, which also sparked a constitutional crisis. The older bill stated that Rulers could withhold assent of a proposed amendment within 30 days once both houses of parliament pass a proposed amendment.

The new constitutional amendment took some interesting twists following its amendments: In 1996, a Singaporean filed to sue the Sultan Ahmad Shah of Pahang for defamation in the special court for the rulers, which was turned down by the Special Court, establishing the precedent that the right to sue a ruler only belongs to a Malaysian citizen.

In 1998, then Tengku Idris (later Sultan Sharafuddin) of Selangor sued a company, Dikim Holdings in the High Court. In 1999, when his father, Sultan Salahuddin was elected as the Yang di-Pertuan Agong (Paramount Ruler) of Malaysia, Tengku Idris was appointed as Regent of Selangor. The case was referred to the Federal Court on whether the Regent is considered a ruler, which the court replied in the negative. In 2001, Sultan Salahuddin died and Tengku Idris ascended the Selangor throne. The case was referred to the Federal Court again, which the court ruled that the High Court had lost jurisdiction over the case, and the case must be withdrawn and refiled in the Special Court. In both cases, only the Special Court had authority to exercise jurisdiction over the rulers, whether they were to be tried or intended to try another party.

The Yang di-Pertuan Besar of Negeri Sembilan, Tuanku Ja'afar became the first ruler to have judgement made against him in the Special Court, whereby he was ordered to settle US$1 million in debts he had owed to a bank. The landmark verdict prompted his oldest son, the Regent of Negeri Sembilan, Tunku Naquiyuddin to advocate the restoration of rulers' immunity during a speech in November 2008. This raised concerns among the public, in view of the history of past royal excesses, but specifically the Gomez incident. Tunku Naquiyuddin, however, added further that immunity to rulers should not be extended to cases when rulers commit acts of criminality, such as assault.

== See also ==
- Constitution of Malaysia
- Monarchies of Malaysia
- Parliament of Malaysia
- Sovereign immunity
- List of crimes committed by members of the Johor royal family
