= KK Mart terrorist attacks =

Terrorist Incident

The KK Mart Terrorist Attacks refer to a series of coordinated firebombing incidents targeting KK Super Mart outlets across Malaysia between January and April 2024. These attacks raised significant concerns about domestic terrorism and public safety.

== Background ==
KK Super Mart is a prominent convenience store chain in Malaysia, known for its widespread presence. The chain became the focal point of a series of violent attacks involving Molotov cocktails, leading to heightened fears and calls for stringent action against domestic terrorism.

== Chronology of Attacks ==
=== March 26, 2024: First KK Mart Attack ===
A KK Super Mart outlet in Bidor, Perak, was targeted at approximately 5:35 a.m. The assailants used a Molotov cocktail, causing damage to the store's exterior. No injuries were reported.

=== March 30, 2024: Second KK Mart Attack ===
Another KK Super Mart in Sungai Isap, Kuantan, Pahang, was attacked at around 5 a.m. The firebomb caused a fire at the store's entrance, which was promptly extinguished by the staff, preventing further damage.

=== April 1, 2024: Third KK Mart Attack ===
A third attack occurred in Taman Melawati, Kuala Lumpur, when another KK Super Mart outlet was targeted with a Molotov cocktail at around 7:45 a.m. The store's entrance suffered minor damage, but no injuries were reported. The Wangsa Maju police launched an immediate investigation and reviewed CCTV footage to identify the perpetrators.

=== April 6, 2024: Arrest of UMNO Youth Chief Akmal Saleh ===
On April 6, 2024, UMNO Youth Chief Muhamad Akmal Saleh was arrested in Sabah amid rising tensions following the KK Mart attacks. His detention led to widespread political reactions, with some party leaders calling for his immediate release, while others supported law enforcement efforts to curb any activities linked to the attacks. Authorities have not disclosed whether his arrest was directly related to the KK Mart firebombings.

== Government and Public Response ==
The attacks prompted strong reactions from government officials and the public:

- National Unity Minister Datuk Aaron Ago Dagang emphasized the necessity of bringing the perpetrators to justice, stating that such acts threaten the peace and security of Malaysia's multiethnic and multireligious communities. He urged all parties to avoid actions that could incite racial tensions.
- Tuaran MP, Datuk Seri Wilfred Madius Tangau, called for immediate action from top government officials, including the Prime Minister and Home Minister, to curb domestic terrorism.
- DAP Chairman Lim Guan Eng urged Prime Minister Datuk Seri Anwar Ibrahim to convene an urgent National Security Council (NSC) meeting to address the escalating situation. He expressed concern over the attacks spreading to regions known for their unity and tolerance.

== See also ==
- Terrorism in Malaysia
- List of terrorist incidents in 2024
