= 2024 Malaysian Allah socks controversy =

Controversy related to the usage of the word Allah on socks in March 2024

KK Super Mart Allah socks incident
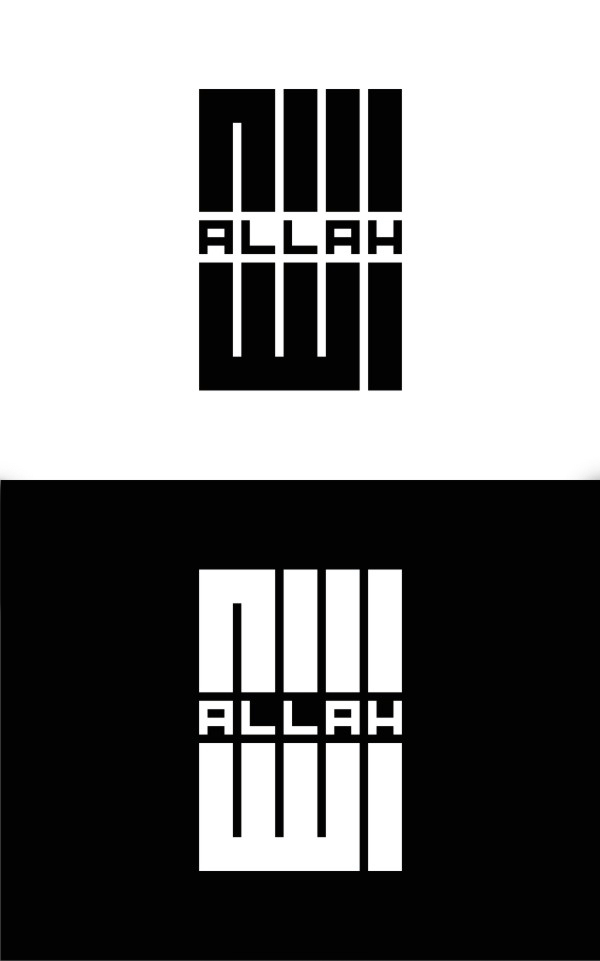
- The graphic designed by Abdulaziz Sahin featured on the controversial socks.
- Date: 13 March 2024
- Location: KK Super Mart, Sunway City, Petaling Jaya, Malaysia
- Caused by: Sale of socks featuring the word "Allah"
- Methods: Boycott calls, Molotov cocktail attacks, social media backlash
- Status: Ongoing investigation, legal actions taken

Parties
Muslim community, Parti Islam Se-Malaysia (PAS), Malaysian government	KK Super Mart, Xin Jian Chang (distributor)

Lead figures
Dr. Muhamad Akmal Saleh, Ab Rauf Yusoh, Razali Idris	KK Super Mart management, Xin Jian Chang distributors

Casualties and losses
3 Molotov cocktail attacks on KK Super Mart outlets	

Incidents
- Arrested: 1 arrest of social media user, legal proceedings against store and distributor directors
- Charged: KK Super Mart directors under Penal Code Section 298; Xin Jian Chang for abetment

On 13 March 2024, a pair of socks featuring the word Allah for sale at a KK Super Mart in Sunway City, Petaling Jaya, sparked public controversy in Malaysia. Due to its perceived insult on Islam, especially on the Muslim holy month of Ramadan at that time the incident quickly gained attention on social media and led to responses from political and religious figures, calls for boycotts, and ultimately, legal action against the store's management and its distributor, Xin Jian Chang. The case drew attention to issues of religious respect in consumer products and prompted debates on freedom of expression and religious sensitivities in Malaysia.

== Reactions ==
This case received the attention of the public and politicians such as Dr. Muhamad Akmal Saleh, Datuk Seri Ab Rauf Yusoh, Datuk Razali Idris, and leaders from Parti Islam Se-Malaysia (PAS). Some political analysts suggested that certain Muslim politicians were leveraging the event to rally support from Malay nationalists and potentially exacerbate divisions in multicultural Malaysia.

Some commentators urged the public not to exaggerate this issue, including Chong Sin Woon, Wee Ka Siong, Loke Siew Fook, Nga Kor Ming, Tiong King Sing, Ahmad Zahid Hamidi and Anwar Ibrahim. On social media, some users called for a boycott of the store chain.

KK Super Mart issued an apology for selling the controversial socks, and they have committed to removing the item from their shelves. The distributor of these socks, Xin Jian Chang, also expressed regret. According to their statement, the socks in question were part of a shipment of 18,800 pairs produced by a Chinese company. Only five pairs out of this large quantity had the contentious print. KK Super Mart confirmed that they discovered these socks in stock at three of their 800 outlets.

=== Attacks after the controversy ===
==== March 26, 2024 ====
A KK Super Mart outlet in Bidor, Perak, was targeted at approximately 5:35 a.m. The assailants used a Molotov cocktail, causing damage to the store's exterior. No injuries were reported.

==== March 30, 2024 ====
Another KK Super Mart in Sungai Isap, Kuantan, Pahang, was attacked at around 5 a.m. The firebomb caused a fire at the store's entrance, which was promptly extinguished by the staff, preventing further damage.

==== April 1, 2024 ====
A third attack occurred in Taman Melawati, Kuala Lumpur, when another KK Super Mart outlet was targeted with a Molotov cocktail at around 7:45 a.m. The store's entrance suffered minor damage, but no injuries were reported. The Wangsa Maju police launched an immediate investigation and reviewed CCTV footage to identify the perpetrators.

=== April 6, 2024: Arrest of UMNO Youth Chief Akmal Saleh ===
On April 6, 2024, UMNO Youth Chief Muhamad Akmal Saleh was arrested in Sabah amid rising tensions following the KK Mart attacks. His detention led to widespread political reactions, with some party leaders calling for his immediate release, while others supported law enforcement efforts to curb any activities linked to the attacks. Authorities have not disclosed whether his arrest was directly related to the KK Mart firebombings.

== Investigation ==
King Ibrahim and Acting Sultan of Johor Tunku Ismail Idris ordered that those responsible are subject to strict action by the authorities to avoid the same incident from happening again.

Director of the Bukit Aman Criminal Investigation Department, Mohd Shuhaily Mohd Zain, said two investigation papers were opened following the receipt of 42 reports. This case will be investigated by the Bukit Aman Classified Crime Investigation Unit under Section 298A of the Penal Code. This section pertains to religious reasons, specifically actions that create an atmosphere of disharmony, division, enmity, hatred, malice, or harm to unity.

On March 20, the man who posted the original photo of the socks to social media was arrested.

On March 25, Malaysian police announced that the directors of KK Super Mart and the Xin Jian Chang distribution company would be held liable in court. The directors of KK Super Mart would be charged under Section 298 of the Penal Code for "intentionally wounding religious feelings", while the Xin Jian Chang distribution company would be charged with "abetting the offense".

== See also ==
- Religion in Malaysia
- Freedom of religion in Malaysia
- Titular Roman Catholic Archbishop of Kuala Lumpur v. Menteri Dalam Negeri
- Murphy Pakiam
- Green Wave
- Conservatism in Malaysia
- Xenophobia in Malaysia
