= Iskandar of Johor =

King of Malaysia from 1984 to 1989

Iskandar: إسكندر
- Al-Mutawakkil Alallah (The Leaner on God)
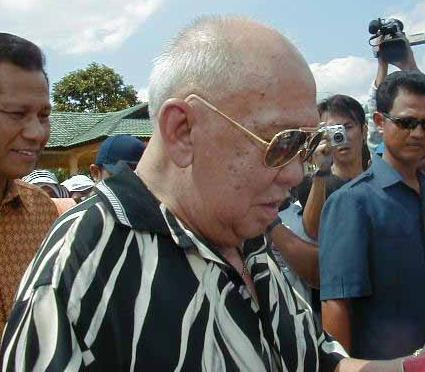
- Iskandar in 2004

King of Malaysia
- Reign: 26 April 1984 – 25 April 1989
- Installation: 15 November 1984
- Predecessor: Ahmad Shah
- Successor: Azlan Shah

Sultan of Johor
- Reign: 11 May 1981 – 22 January 2010
- Predecessor: Ismail
- Successor: Ibrahim
- Born: 8 April 1932; Istana Semayam, Johor Bahru, Johor, Unfederated Malay States
- Died: 22 January 2010 (aged 77); Johor Bahru, Johor, Malaysia
- Burial: 23 January 2010; Mahmoodiah Royal Mausoleum, Johor Bahru, Johor, Malaysia
- Spouse: Josephine Ruby Trevorrow (Khalsom binti Abdullah) (m. 1956; div. 1962) Sultanah Zanariah (m. 1961)
- Issue: Tunku Kamariah Aminah Maimunah Iskandariah; Tunku Zabedah Aminah Maimunah Iskandariah; Tunku Ibrahim Ismail; Tunku Hajah Azizah Aminah Maimunah Iskandariah; Tunku Mariam Zaharah; Tunku Noraini Fatimah; Tunku Maimunah Ismailiah; Tunku Abdul Majid Idris Ismail Ibrahim; Tunku Muna Najiah; Tunku Aminah Kalsum Masera Marian Zahira Iskandariah
Names
- Tunku Mahmood Iskandar ibni Tunku Ismail
Regnal name
- Baginda Almutawakil Alallah Sultan Iskandar ibni Almarhum Sultan Ismail
- House: Temenggong
- Father: Sultan Ismail Ibni Almarhum Sultan Ibrahim Al-Masyhur
- Mother: Sultanah Ungku Tun Aminah Binti Ungku Ahmad
- Religion: Sunni Islam

Iskandar ibni Almarhum Sultan Ismail (Jawi: المتوكل على ﷲ سلطان إسكندر الحاج ابن المرحوم سلطان إسماعيل الخالدي; 8 April 1932 – 22 January 2010) was Sultan of Johor, succeeding his father Sultan Ismail upon the latter's death in 1981. He reigned as the eighth Yang di-Pertuan Agong, the constitutional monarch of Malaysia, from 1984 to 1989. Sultan Iskandar's reign as Sultan of Johor lasted almost 29 years until his death in 2010.

His children are married into the different royal houses of Malaysia. His eldest daughter Tunku Kamariah married the Tengku Laksamana of Selangor, Tengku Sulaiman Shah. His successor and eldest son Sultan Ibrahim Iskandar married Raja Zarith Sofiah of the Perak royal family. His daughter Tunku Azizah Aminah Maimunah Iskandariah married the heir apparent of Pahang, now Sultan Abdullah. His younger son Tunku Abdul Majid married a member of the Kedah royal family, Tunku Teh Mazni.

As was the case with his grandfather, Sultan Ibrahim, Sultan Iskandar's independent mindset resulted in strained relations with the Malaysian federal government on numerous occasions. This was most prevalent during his time as the Yang di-Pertuan Agong, as there were a number of notable public incidents involved Sultan Iskandar. Nevertheless, Sultan Iskandar was reputed to show great concern for his subjects, and was held in high esteem by many of his subjects–particularly the Malays and Orang Aslis. His time as the Sultan of Johor was marred by accusations of violence and brutality. Sultan Iskandar was notorious for his bad temper which often resulted in violent episodes of rage and brutality to members of his staff and the general public. The 1992 Gomez incident surrounding the Sultan eventually culminated in the removal of "legal immunity" for members of the royal family.

Sultan Iskandar is reputed to have been a staunch disciplinarian, with willingness to occasionally voice personal opinions on governmental issues. On the personal side, subjects who approached the Sultan in his later years described him as a person with a warm and generous personality. However, past critics had also argued that Sultan Iskandar was a person with a turbulent temper. These claims were made by citing records of notorious incidents, which include an experience of being disinherited from being the Tunku Mahkota of Johor (or Crown Prince in English) by his father, in 1961, as well as a series of alleged criminal acts occurring between the 1970s and the 1990s which were published in the press and provoked widespread moral outrage within the Malaysian public.

During his younger days as a prince, Iskandar was commonly known by his first name, "Mahmood" or his full name "Mahmood Iskandar". He largely discontinued the use of his first name after he became sultan in 1981, although some people occasionally referred to him by his full name.

== Early life ==
Sultan Iskandar (known as Tunku Mahmood Iskandar^{[γ]} until 1981) was the third and eldest surviving son of Sultan Ismail, (he had two older brothers, both of whom died in infancy) and was born on at 11:30 a.m. 8 April 1932 in the Istana Semayam, Johor Bahru. Mahmood received his primary and lower secondary education in Ngee Heng Primary School and the English College Johore Bahru (now Maktab Sultan Abu Bakar) in Johor Bahru. In 1952, he was sent to Australia for higher secondary education at Trinity Grammar School. After completing high school in 1953, Mahmood travelled to the Isle of Wight in the United Kingdom, where he was enrolled in the Upper Chine School for three years.

== Sultan of Johor ==
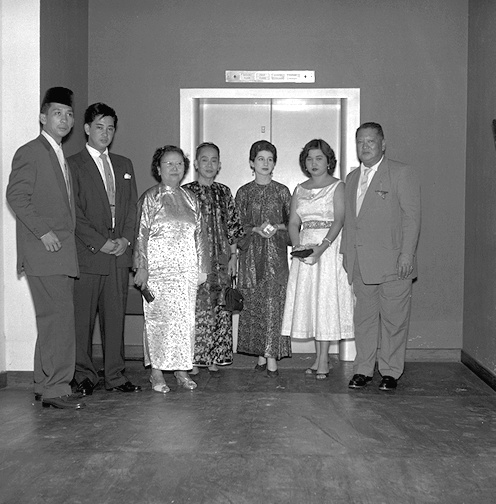
The Royal family of Johor on celebrating the birthday of Dr Heah Hock Chye in 1956. From left: Tunku Mahmood Iskandar, Tunku Abdul Rahman, Sultanah Aminah, Che Khalsom binti Abdullah (Josephine Ruby Trevorrow, wife to Tunku Mahmood Iskandar), Tunku Maimunah, Sultan Ismail of Johor.

Mahmood returned to Malaysia in 1956 upon completing his studies, and briefly served as a cadet officer in the Johor Civil Service, taking charge of affairs in District Affairs, Land and Treasury departments until his appointment as the Tunku Mahkota of Johor in May 1959. Mahmood was appointed the Tunku Mahkota of Johor from 1959 to 1961, and Raja Muda of Johor from 1966 to 1981, by Sultan Ismail. On 29 April 1981, he was re-appointed as the Tunku Mahkota shortly before his father's death.

On 10 May 1981, Mahmood was appointed as the Regent of Johor following the death of his father, and was sworn in as Sultan a day later, shortly before his father was buried. In turn, his younger brother, Tunku Abdul Rahman (not to be confused with Tunku Abdul Rahman, Malaysia's first prime minister), formerly the Tunku Mahkota of Johor for twenty years under Sultan Ismail, was demoted to a lower position, the Tunku Bendahara of Johor, a post which he held until his death in 1989. In the same year on 12 December, Sultan Iskandar was appointed as the Chancellor of the University of Technology Malaysia. Unlike the other preceding Sultan of Johors who had their own coronation ceremony, he did not have one.

Under the council of rulers, the elective monarchy system of Malaysia, Sultan Iskandar was elected on 9 February 1984 as the Yang Di-Pertuan Agong, shortly before his predecessor's term expired on 26 April 1984. He succeeded the Sultan of Pahang as the Yang-Di Pertuan Agong on 26 April. A royal investiture was held shortly after that, in which he donned the traditional suit of the Agong, whereby he was officially installed. Sultan Iskandar served in the capacity as the Yang-Di Pertuan Agong until 1989, being succeeded by the Sultan of Perak. As the Yang di-Pertuan Agong, Sultan Iskandar was automatically designated under constitutional provisions as the Supreme Commander of the Malaysian Armed Forces, holding the rank of the Marshal of the Royal Malaysian Air Force, Admiral of the Fleet of the Royal Malaysian Navy and Field Marshal of the Army.

On 8 April 2006, the Sultan appointed his grandson Tunku Ismail Idris–the son of the Tunku Mahkota then–as the Raja Muda during an investiture in conjunction with his birthday. The rank of Raja Muda denoted that Ismail Idris was second in the line of succession to the Johorean royal throne.

=== State affairs ===
Sultan Iskandar held annual open house events either at the Istana Bukit Serene, his official residence, or at the Istana Besar. On these days, the Sultan and his eldest son, the Tunku Mahkota, held special sessions whereby Johoreans came up to pay their respects to him. The Sultan also bestowed honorary awards on distinguished Malaysians from his annual birthday honours list on his birthday. As a matter of convention, the state government made 8 April a state public holiday to mark his birthday.

Shortly before he became Agong in April 1984, Sultan Iskandar issued a proposal for the Orang Aslis to be referred to as the "Bumiputera Asli" (literally, Original Sons of the Soil). The proposal was made as Sultan Iskandar suggested that the Orang Aslis maintained a distinct identity from the Malays as the majority of them were not Muslims. The proposal was subsequently scrapped, and the government made subsequent attempts to assimilate the Orang Aslis with the mainstream Malay society. After his inauguration as the Yang di-Pertuan Agong, he donated his Agong's salary to various scholarship boards that were open to Malaysians of all races.

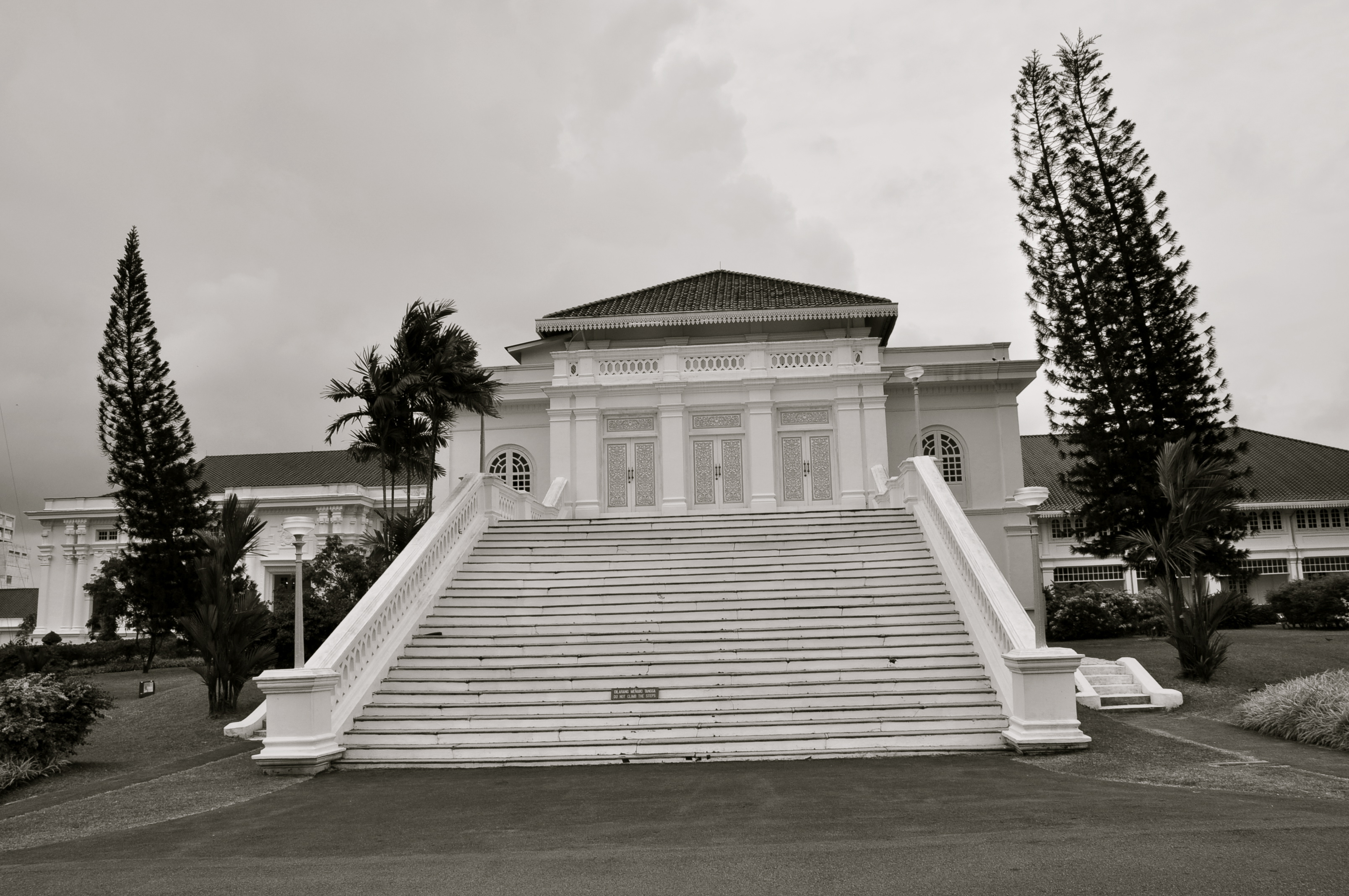
Steps to the main hall of Istana Besar, Johor Bahru

Sultan Iskandar issued a decree in 2007 which only allowed residences and properties owned by the Sultan and the Tunku Mahkota to be called Istana, while properties belonging to other members of the royal family are to be known as "Kediaman". The terms "Istana" and "Kediaman" are translated as "Palace" and "Residences" in English, respectively. The following December, Sultan Iskandar gave his endorsement for the state government to pass a law which would ban Muslims in the state from practising Yoga, citing that Hindu elements in the exercise went against Islamic teachings. Applications to seek the Sultan's consent came from the state religious council, who acted under the instructions of the National Fatwa Council.

Sultan Iskandar graced the official landmark opening of the Sultan Iskandar customs, immigration and quarantine complex on 1 December 2008, in the presence of the Tunku Mahkota and several key cabinet ministers. The complex was named in honour of the Sultan, who expressed optimism for its success during his opening speech.

=== Foreign relations ===
Since his ascension to the throne, Sultan Iskandar fostered particularly close ties with Singapore, by developing a personal rapport with top Singaporean leaders. This practice was also taken up by his sons, the Tunku Mahkota and Tunku Aris Bendahara. Media reports highlighted the particularly warm reception which leaders of both countries received whenever they visited each other's domains, particularly in July 1988, when Sultan Iskandar's visit to Singapore marked the first official visit by any Yang di-Pertuan Agong since 1957. Between these years, Sultan Iskandar has been awarded or been given the following awards by Singaporean political leaders:

- 1988: Singapore Deputy Prime Minister Goh Chok Tong received the Dato' Paduka Mahkota Johor (Kehormat) from the Sultan.
- 2007: Sultan Iskandar was presented with the Honorary Master Parachutist Wing by Singapore Defence Minister Teo Chee Hean.
- 2007: Conferred the Honorary Degree of Doctor of Laws by the National University of Singapore.

Relations with Singapore soured after the International Court of Justice ruled in Singapore's favour following a long legal battle over the sovereignty of Pedra Branca. At the inaugural session of the 12th Johor State Assembly in 2008, the Sultan stated his continued support of Malaysia's claim to Pedra Branca, and vowed to find legal means to retrieve the island's sovereignty.

Sultan Iskandar also fostered a fairly close relationship with the Sultan of Brunei, Hassanal Bolkiah, particularly during his days as the Yang Di-Pertuan Agong. In 2006, they were again seen together in public, after Sultan Hassanal Bolkiah made a state visit to Johor to express his interest in the Iskandar Development Region.

== Controversies ==
=== Succession ===
Prior to being the Sultan or Agong, and even during the 1980s and early 1990s, Mahmood's reputation was marred by a number of controversial incidents which received occasional attention from the media. One of these earliest incidents was the loss of his status as Tunku Mahkota in 1961–a position which his father, Sultan Ismail, appointed him to two years earlier, citing reasons of alleged misbehaviour after confidential reports accusing him of incarcerating a policeman reached the Sultan. Iskandar's younger brother, Abdul Rahman (Tunku Bendahara of Johor) was appointed as the Tunku Mahkota in favour of him. Nevertheless, in 1966, Mahmood Iskandar was appointed the Raja Muda–which put him second in line to the throne. In April 1981, Mahmood was reinstated as Tunku Mahkota shortly before his father's death the following month and was subsequently installed as the Sultan of Johor, under the orders of his father.

However, some eyewitnesses challenged the legitimacy of Mahmood's reappointment as the Mahkota, by arguing that they witnessed Sultan Ismail already having lapsed into coma at the time of his appointment as the regent. Records stated that Sultan Ismail lapsed into a coma on 8 May, three days before his death. Relations with the Menteri Besar of Johor, Othman Saat deteriorated when the latter questioned Iskandar's legitimacy to the throne, which led to an incident which saw the Sultan issuing an order to the Menteri Besar to vacate his office within 24 hours, shortly after Sultan Ismail's death, citing that he needed that office space for himself. The Menteri Besar heeded his order, though the Sultan did not move in as he had said. Othman Saat subsequently resigned the following year as the Menteri Besar.

=== Criminal misconduct ===
In 1972, Mahmood was charged in Sessions Court for assault on three separate cases:

1. for using chemical mace on two men for overtaking his car;
2. for assaulting a customs officer who did not reply his question on why his car was prevented from repairs at an automobile assembly plant;
3. for slapping, dragging, and beating Engku Zaki and Engku Mohsin with a polo club, and subsequently spraying tear gas on them and Engku Mohsin's wife, Tengku Zakiah binti Tengku Mohamed Yusoff –granddaughter of Sultan Ismail Nasiruddin of Terengganu– for using his name to avoid customs duties.

He was initially held on a RM5,200 peace bond on all charges and avoided conviction. However after the prosecution's appeal, Mahmood was convicted by the High Court in the second and third case and fined for a total of RM2,500 in January 1973. High Court's judge, Raja Azlan Shah, when delivering the sentence described the third case as "like pages torn from some mediaeval times" and characterised his actions as "sadistic brutality".

A year later, reports surfaced of another similar attack on a young couple, when Iskandar, together with his bodyguard, attacked them after they allegedly offended him. Another incident took place at about this time when Mahmood restrained two policemen in a dog kennel for a day after they had angered him.

In 1977, Mahmood was charged and convicted for manslaughter for shooting and killing a man near his private helicopter, whom he took to be a smuggler. In both cases, his father, Sultan Ismail, intervened and granted official pardons to Mahmood. Similarly, his eldest son, Tunku Ibrahim Ismail, was convicted in the 1980s for shooting a man to death in a nightclub during a feud, but was quickly pardoned.

In 1987, Sultan Iskandar was further accused of causing the death of a golf caddy in the Cameron Highlands by assault, following an incident in which the golf caddy laughed when the Sultan missed a shot. Tunku Abdul Rahman, Malaysia's first Prime Minister, pointed out that the Sultan, at the time serving as Yang di-Pertuan Agong, could not be prosecuted due to immunity that was accorded to rulers, while at the same time condemning Sultan Iskandar's actions. Eventually, the matter passed without much further public attention. The brother of the caddy – who also suffered injuries during the incident, being distressed from what he saw, subsequently ran amok in Kuala Lumpur and had to be quarantined in a mental hospital.

=== Gomez incident ===
==== Assault ====
In late 1992, two separate assault cases by the Sultan as well as his younger son, Tunku Abdul Majid Idris, on hockey coaches culminated in the stripping of immunity of rulers from prosecution. Both cases received considerable attention in the local and international news which was dubbed as "The Gomez Incident". The incident was kicked off on 10 July 1992, when Sultan Iskandar's second son, the Tunku Bendahara– Tunku Abdul Majid Idris, lost his temper during a hockey match with the Perak hockey team after Perak won the match by a penalty stroke, and assaulted the Perak goalkeeper, Mohamed Ja'afar Mohamed Vello. The goalkeeper later lodged a police report on 30 July. The incident received public attention, especially when the matter was debated in parliament. The incident resulted in the Malaysian Hockey Federation issuing Majid – then second-in line to the throne after his elder brother – a ban of five years from participating in any tournaments following investigations. Tunku Abdul Majid was later convicted of assault in January 1993, of which the chief justice sentenced him to a year in prison, on top of a RM 2,000 fine. He was released on a bail, and these charges were later dropped on grounds of immunity, which was still applicable at the time when the act was committed.

The Sultan responded to the ban by putting pressure on the state authorities to pull Johorean hockey teams from all national tournaments. In November 1992, Douglas Gomez, a coach for the Maktab Sultan Abu Bakar field hockey team, expressed his displeasure at being called to withdraw from a semi-final national hockey match by the Director of the Johor Education Department. The incident attracted the attention of the Sultan, who personally summoned Gomez to his palace, the Istana Bukit Serene, where he was promptly reprimanded and assaulted by the Sultan. Following Gomez's meeting with the Sultan, Gomez sought treatment to his face and stomach. Subsequently, he lodged a police report against the Sultan for assault. Gomez elaborated that the Sultan's bodyguards and members of the Johor Military Forces present were merely onlookers, and that the Sultan was solely responsible for the injuries.

==== Public responses and follow ups ====
The assault resulted in a public outcry over the event which pressured all levels of the government up to the top ranks of the federal government to investigate into the matter. In the closing months of 1992, and also the opening months of 1993, dozens of articles mentioning misdeeds by the royal families of several states–but in particular Sultan Iskandar himself were published. A good deal of these alleged misdeeds that were mentioned included the charging of exorbitant fines–way above the prescribed legal limits–upon offenders who had obstructed the Sultan's car, amongst others. Sultan Iskandar, bore the brunt of the backlash by the numerous references centred towards alleged acts of criminal wrongdoings even though many of the listed acts were committed by other members of the royal family.

The criticisms roused by the press prompted Members of Parliament of the Dewan Rakyat to convene a special session on 10 December 1992. All 96 parliamentarians present passed a unanimous resolution which called for action to curb the powers of the rulers if necessary. During the special meeting, parliamentarians disclosed past criminal records of Sultan Iskandar and his two sons, all of whom had been involved in a total of at least 23 cases of assault and manslaughter, five of which were committed by the Sultan after 1981, two by the Mahkota and three by the Bendahara.

A bill was passed by both the Dewan Rakyat and Dewan Negara on 19 and 20 January 1993 respectively. The bill, which proposed to remove legal immunity was approved by six out of nine sultans–but saw stiff opposition from three, two of which included Sultan Ismail Petra of Kelantan and Sultan Iskandar himself. Sultan Iskandar took up the initiative to obtain more royal support to stall the implementation of the proposed bill. The bill, which proposed to strip rulers and members of the royal families of legal immunity, would make them prosecutable by the law in any cases of proven criminal wrongdoings.

Sultan Iskandar organised a rally which was to be held outside his palace on 8 January 1993 with the aim of garnering public support to stall the bill's implementation. However, after intense pressure from the government, the rally was cancelled on 3 January. A report made during the rally quoted Sultan Iskandar calling upon all local civil servants to boycott state and federal functions in a show of support for his motion. Meanwhile, the federal government continued to pressure the rulers into assenting to the bills, which they did after several revisions of the bill were made by the government. Following which, the proposed bill was enshrined into the Federal Constitution in March 1993.

The bill allowed rulers who violated the laws to be prosecuted, while the Sedition Act of 1948 was also amended to allow public criticism of the rulers. A special court was created –presided by the Lord President of the Federal Court– to empower and prosecute members of the rulers and immediate members of the royal household.

==== Aftermath ====
Sultan Iskandar and his family members were not prosecuted for their past violations of the law on grounds that the royal immunity was still applicable when those incidents occurred. Nevertheless, shortly after the incident, Sultan Iskandar was prompted to take steps to rehabilitate his public image, which was more or less tarnished by the incident. In a public speech shortly after the episode, the Sultan was noted to have somewhat toned down his hardline image and appeared to be somewhat more humble, appealing to Johoreans to maintain their loyalty to him.

The Gomez incident also led to a review and proposal by the Federal Government in December 1992 to disband the Johor Military Forces (JMF), which was agreed to by the State Government of Johor in August 1993. This led to the tabling of a disbandment bill in the parliament on 4 July 1994. However, the bill was withdrawn from parliament two days later.

=== Political ===
==== Yang di-Pertuan Agong (1980s) ====
Shortly before his election as the Yang-Di Pertuan Agong in 1983, a spate of reports alleging Sultan Iskandar's intention to launch a coup d'état by launching a state of emergency to overthrow the government circulated within political circles, which reached Prime Minister of Malaysia Mahathir Mohamad. The Sultan reportedly fostered close relations with several key military personnel, including the Army chief Jeneral Zain Hashim. The government subsequently took action to curb loopholes within the constitutional framework and to reduce the power of the royal veto in passing legislation, culminating in a constitutional crisis in late 1983. Nevertheless, during his inaugural speech as the Agong in 1984, about a month after the constitutional amendments were passed in parliament, Sultan Iskandar voiced public support for the revised constitution and pledged to act in accordance to the Prime Minister's advice.

A diplomatic scandal between the United Kingdom and Malaysia broke out in 1984, when several British newspapers published pieces on Sultan Iskandar's coronation, citing the headlines such as "Killer becomes King" and "King a Killer", which enraged the Malaysian government, who demanded an apology from the British government. The British government refused to apologise on behalf of the newspapers, triggering tensions between the two countries. Two months later, in June 1984, Sultan Iskandar in his capacity as the Agong, surprised the Malaysian public when he publicly called upon Deputy Prime Minister, Musa Hitam, to make a public apology in front of the entire congregation present at the National Mosque. Sultan Iskandar, on his part, was angry over remarks which Musa made during the course of the 1983 constitutional crisis that he deemed to be disrespectful. Musa abided to the Agong's demand and boldly came forward to make the apology, which was greeted by a thunderous applause from the entire congregation. The event, which was broadcast live throughout the nation on Malaysian Radio (although the television stations abruptly terminated its broadcast halfway), was seen by many observers as an act of confrontation by the Agong to put Musa in his place.

In 1988, also serving in his capacity as the Yang-Di Pertuan Agong, the Lord President of the Federal Court Tun Salleh Abas was sacked by the Agong in what led to the 1988 Malaysian constitutional crisis. However, observers suggested a remarkably warm relationship between Prime Minister Mahathir Mohamad and the Agong, both of whom shared common resentment towards the chief justice, Salleh Abas. In 1973, Iskandar was convicted of assault and was sentenced to six months imprisonment, to which Salleh Abas served as the public prosecutor hearing the case. As the public prosecutor, Salleh had appealed to the chief justice, Raja Azlan Shah, for handing down a heavier sentence for Iskandar, which earned his wrath. The sacking of the Lord President, was however not without controversy, given the alleged manner in which the Agong and Prime Minister had handled the matter–including an incident which the Agong had refused to forgive the Lord President in spite of Salleh's willingness to offer his apology to the Agong, which he turned down.

==== Later years (2000 onwards) ====
Sultan Iskandar's public call to support Abdullah Badawi's administration in October 2006 created a minor stir among Mahathir's supporters, when he remarked that "Mahathir should act like a pensioner". The call came at a time when Mahathir's spate of criticisms against Abdullah's was at its most intense. The Sultan was the first state ruler to publicly defend the policy of the government during the period of Mahathir's criticisms against the Abdullah administration. Earlier sources however, noted Sultan Iskandar's concerns with the deepening rift between Mahathir and Abdullah and had asked to be photographed together with the two leaders during the United Malays National Organisations (UMNO) 60th anniversary celebrations in Johor Bahru.

A month later, in November 2006, another small stir erupted during the launching ceremony of the Iskandar Development Region, when Sultan Iskandar voiced his opinion that the Causeway, which connects Johor and Singapore, should be removed to allow ships to pass through to promote development of the state. He also remarked that the people should be wary of all foreigners as they were "vultures" and also urged the people not to hold them in high regard, citing his displeasure that his ancestors were "deceived" by dirty tactics employed by colonialists to build the Causeway.

At the inaugural 12th Johor State Assembly Seating in April 2008, a minor controversy erupted when one opposition state assemblyman (ADUN), Gwee Tong Hiang, flouted dress regulations by appearing in a lounge suit and tie instead of the usual official attire and songkok. This resulted in him being dismissed from the assembly chamber shortly before the Sultan's arrival. Gwee, a Democratic Action Party (DAP) ADUN, reportedly argued that there was no stated order to wear the official attire and songkok and stated his desire to wear a western suit, promptly drew flak from other ADUNs and the Menteri Besar, Abdul Ghani Othman who had earlier on met to agree to don in the official attire and songkok prior to the assembly, whereby Gwee was absent. The Sultan, apparently angry at Gwee, sharply criticised him two days later and publicly called upon Gwee to seek an audience with him.

=== Lifestyle ===
During his time as the Agong, Sultan Iskandar was often seen in public carrying a pistol in his waistband, which drew considerable concern and discomfort from the Malaysian public due to his past record of criminal offences. He was also reputed to have led a flamboyant lifestyle, which also drew similar criticism. He was also known to be a motorbike enthusiast; documentaries on national patriotism would feature Sultan Iskandar, the then-Agong, riding out on a police motorbike and his flamboyant appearance during a few public ceremonies. These documentaries drew criticisms from the Malaysian public, who felt that the television clips of Sultan Iskandar were inappropriate for its theme and national image.

== Personal life ==
In 1956, Mahmood married Josephine Ruby Trevorrow, from Cornwall, United Kingdom, with whom he had four children, including his successor, Sultan Ibrahim Iskandar of Johor, King of Malaysia (as of 31 January 2024), and Tunku Azizah Aminah Maimunah Iskandariah. The marriage ended in divorce in 1962. He married again in 1961 – shortly before his divorce to Trevorrow, to Tengku Zanariah, who came from the Kelantan royal family. Tengku Zanariah had six children with the Sultan. Analysts such as Kate Wharton have observed that any literal references to Trevorrow's association with Sultan Iskandar were carefully omitted in all official biographies.

As a youth, Mahmood qualified as a pilot, having trained in handling light and medium aircraft and helicopters. He was also apt in handling motorcycles, reportedly possessing the skills to strip a motorcycle down to its component parts and then reassemble it.

The Sultan is also well-known for his passion in many types of open-air sports, especially polo and golf. In his later years, he spent much of his free time at the Royal Johor Country Club. In addition, he also played tennis and squash on a regular basis. Within private circles, Sultan Iskandar was fondly known as "Moody", a testimony to his first name "Mahmud." His son, Abdul Majid, inherited his interest in amateur golf and once served as the President of the Malaysian Golf Association.

He kept a large collection of pets, particularly peacocks, at the Istana Bukit Serene compound, where he lived with the Sultanah. In his youth, Iskandar resided at the Istana Bukit Coombe, located at the top of Coombe Hill. It was built based on Dutch architectural designs, and was later renamed Istana Bukit Iskandar. The palace was later demolished in 1987, six years after Sultan Iskandar succeeded his late father as Sultan.

He made a personal friendship with Philippine opposition leader Benigno Aquino Jr. His son picked Aquino up at Changi airport and drove to Johor where he and Aquino had a meeting with the latter days before the former Philippine senator was assassinated.

== Issue ==
Mahmood Iskandar had ten children, the elder four by his first wife Khalsom binti Abdullah and the younger six by his second wife Tengku Zanariah.

Name	Birth date	Birth place	Death date	Death place	Marriage date	Spouse	Children	Grandchildren
YAM Tunku Puteri Kamariah Aminah Maimunah Iskandariah	11 July 1956 (age 70)	Johor Bahru, Johor			2 May 1977 – divorced	YAM Tengku Sulaiman Shah, Tengku Laksamana Selangor	YM Tengku Haji Shakirinal'Amin Mahmood Ismail Ahmad Shah; YDM Tengku Salehuddin Ismail Shah, Tengku Indera Bijaya Diraja Selangor; YM Tengku Shahrain Ismail Ibrahim Iskandar Hishamuddin Shah; YM Tengku Shariffuddin Ibrahim Ismail Iskandar Abdul Aziz Shah; YM Tengku Kathira Zanariah Ehsan Maimunah Aminah Iskandar Putri	YM Tengku Mahmood; YM Tengku Sulaiman; YM Tengku Abdulaziz; YM Tengku Ibrahim; YM Tengku Kamiliah Zanariah Ruby Ehsan Putri; YM Tengku Kamariah; YM Tengku Saidatul’Ihsan Zabedah Fauziah Putri
YAM Tunku Besar Zabedah Aminah Maimunah Iskandariah	20 October 1957 (age 69)	Johor Bahru, Johor						
KDYMM Sultan Ibrahim, The Yang di-Pertuan Agong XVII; Sultan Johor	22 November 1958 (age 67)	Sultanah Aminah Hospital, Johor Bahru, Johor			22 September 1982	KDYMM Raja Zarith Sofiah, Raja Permaisuri Agong; Permaisuri Johor	DYAM Tunku Ismail Idris Abdul Majid Abu Bakar, Tunku Mahkota Johor; YAM Tunku Tun Aminah Maimunah Iskandariah; YAM Tunku Idris Iskandar Ismail, Tunku Temenggong Johor; Almarhum YAM Tunku Abdul Jalil Iskandar,Tunku Laksamana Johor; YAM Tunku Abdul Rahman Hassanal Jeffri,Tunku Panglima Johor; YAM Tunku Abu Bakar Mahmood Iskandar, Tunku Putera Johor	YAM Tunku Khalsom Aminah Sofiah; DYAM Tunku Iskandar Abdul Jalil Abu Bakar Ibrahim, Raja Muda Johor; YAM Tunku Abu Bakar Ibrahim; Layla Sofiah; the second child (undeclared name) of Tunku Tun Aminah; YAM Tunku Zahrah Zarith Aziyah
KDPB Tunku Azizah Aminah Maimunah Iskandariah, Tengku Ampuan Pahang	5 August 1960 (age 66)	Istana Bukit Stulang, Johor Bahru, Johor			6 March 1986	KDPB Al-Sultan Abdullah Ri’ayatuddin Al-Mustafa Billah Shah, Sultan of Pahang	YAM Tengku Amir Nasser Ibrahim (Adopted), Tengku Panglima Raja; Almarhum YAM Tengku Ahmad Iskandar Shah (born and died 24 July 1990); KDPM Tengku Hassanal Ibrahim Alam Shah, Tengku Mahkota Pahang; YAM Tengku Muhammad Iskandar Ri’ayatuddin Shah,Tengku Arif Bendahara; YAM Tengku Ahmad Ismail Mu’adzam Shah,Tengku Panglima Muda; YAM Tengku Puteri Afzan Aminah Hafizatullah; YAM Tengku Puteri Jihan Azizah Athiyatullah	YM Tengku Adam Ibrahim Shah; YM Tengku Sulaiman Abdullah Shah; YM Tengku Nuh Muhammad Shah; YM Tengku Nadine Amina Zahra
YAM Tunku Mariam Zahrah	4 September 1962 (age 64)	Johor Bahru, Johor			1999 – divorced	YM Tengku Ahmad Zainul Abidin	YM Tengku Sofiyya Meryam Zanariah	
YAM Tunku Noraini Fatimah	17 July 1963 (age 63)	Johor Bahru, Johor			2000	Mr. Ramlan		
YAM Tunku Maimunah Ismailiah	20 October 1967 (age 59)	Johor Bahru, Johor			7 May 2004 – divorced	Dato’ Mizan	Puteri Wan Makhzanah Huriyah	
YAM Tunku Abdul Majid Idris Ismail Ibrahim, Tunku Aris Bendahara Johor	20 July 1970 (age 56)	Sultanah Aminah Hospital, Johor Bahru, Johor			13 January 2006	YM Tunku Teh Mazni	YM Tunku Mahmood Iskandar; YM Tunku Aisha Menjalara Iskandar; YM Tunku Abdul Mateen Idris Ismail Ibrahim Iskandar	
YAM Tunku Muna Najiah	12 April 1973 (age 53)	Johor Bahru, Johor			5 October 2001	First Admiral Ts. Dr. Shaftdean Lufty, RMN	Putera Wan Iskandar Abdul Rahman Uwais Sirajuddin; Puteri Wan Zanariah Imanina Munawarrah Nora Iskandariah; Putera Wan Muhammad Umayr Sharaf uddin; Puteri Wan Najiah Umayra Munawarrah	
YAM Tunku Aminah Kalsom Masera Marian Zahira Iskandariah	6 June 1979 (age 47)	Johor Bahru, Johor						

== Health ==
After undergoing a coronary bypass operation in the United States in 2000, close aides reported that Sultan Iskandar slowed down somewhat in his pace of life and took to playing golf only on an occasional basis. A bout of bronchitis in January 2008 saw the Sultan being briefly admitted and treated in a local hospital.

== Death ==
Sultan Iskandar died on 22 January 2010 at 7:15 pm at the Puteri Specialist Hospital, Johor Bahru after being admitted earlier in the day following an illness at age 77. His death was officially announced at 11:20 pm by Menteri Besar of Johor Datuk Abdul Ghani Othman it was also announced that flags in Johor would be put at mast Johor starting from 6:00 am until 6:00 pm. He was brought to the Istana Besar, Johor Bahru for laying in state and was buried in the Mahmoodiah Royal Mausoleum the next day at 2:00 pm. Before that, the public was allowed to pay their last respects to Sultan Iskandar from early morning.

Among the royal family and other dignitaries present to give their last respects was the Yang Di-Pertuan Agong Mizan Zainal Abidin and Raja Permaisuri Agong Nur Zahirah, the Sultan of Brunei Hassanal Bolkiah, the Raja of Perlis Sirajuddin, the Sultan of Pahang Ahmad Shah, the Sultan of Kedah Abdul Halim, the Sultan of Perak Azlan Shah, the Sultan of Selangor Sharafuddin, the Yang Dipertuan Besar of Negeri Sembilan Muhriz, the Regent of Perlis Syed Faizuddin Putra Jamalullail, the Tengku Mahkota of Pahang Abdullah, and the Tengku Mahkota of Kelantan Tengku Muhammad Faris Petra. Prime Minister Najib Razak, cut his visit to India short to attend his funeral. Also present were Prime Minister of Singapore Lee Hsien Loong and Senior Minister Goh Chok Tong.

His son the Tunku Mahkota of Johor Ibrahim Ismail was proclaimed Sultan of Johor on 23 January.

== Legacy ==
Several projects and institutions were named after the Sultan, including:

=== Educational institutions ===
- Institute Sultan Iskandar of Urban Habitat and Highrise, Universiti Teknologi Malaysia
- SMK Tunku Mahmood Iskandar, Sungai Mati, Muar
- SMK Mahmood Iskandar, Parit Saidi, Batu Pahat
- SK Tengku Mahmood Iskandar 1 and 2, Pontian
- SMS Sultan Iskandar (formerly known as SBPI Mersing), Mersing

=== Buildings ===
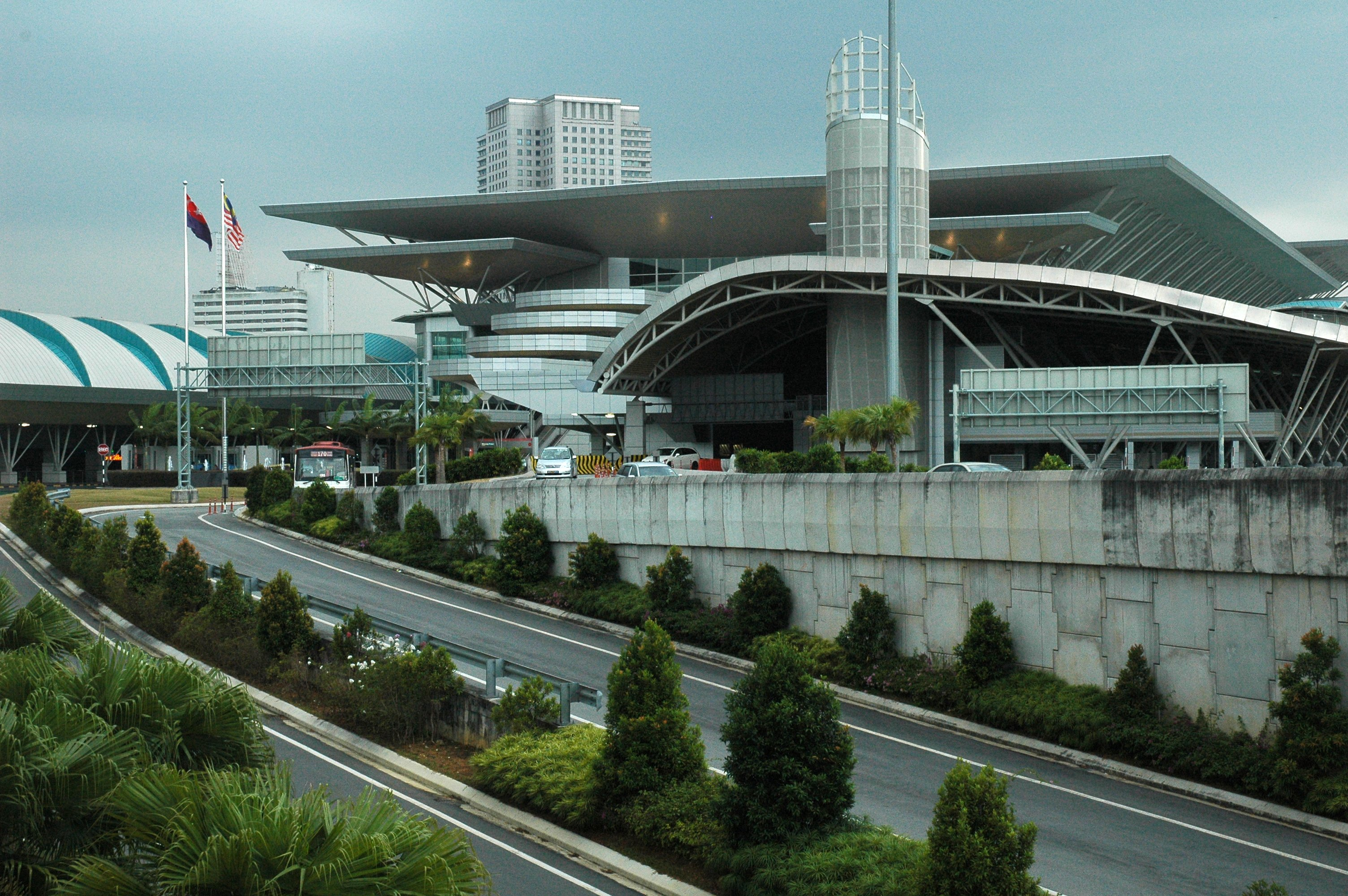
Bangunan Sultan Iskandar–Customs, Immigration and Quarantine centre was opened in December 2008.

- Sultan Iskandar Building, a customs, immigration and quarantine complex opened in December 2008
- Bangunan Sultan Iskandar, Kota Tinggi district office of the Malaysian Public Works Department
- Bangunan Sultan Iskandar, Federal government headquarters for Youth and Sports in Sarawak, located in Kuching, Sarawak.
- Dewan Sultan Iskandar, Universiti Teknologi Malaysia
- Sultan Iskandar Planetarium, the first planetarium in Malaysia, located in Kuching Civic Centre, Kuching, Sarawak
- Sultan Iskandar Broadcasting Complex, headquarters of Johor FM at Jalan Datin Halimah
- Pusat Islam Iskandar Johor, the Johor Islamic Centre in Johor Bahru
- Masjid Iskandar, a mosque at Kem Iskandar, a Commando military camp in Mersing.
- Sultan Iskandar Mosque, a mosque at Mersing and Bandar Dato' Onn
- Mosque of Kota Iskandar, a state mosque in Kota Iskandar, Iskandar Puteri
- Sultan Iskandar Power Station, Pasir Gudang
- Sultan Iskandar Reservoir, a water reservoir east of Johor Bahru
- Iskandar Coastal Bridge

=== Roads ===
- Lebuhraya Sultan Iskandar, a stretch of the Iskandar Coastal Highway from Danga Bay to Iskandar Puteri
- Lebuhraya Sultan Iskandar (formerly Lebuhraya Mahameru), part of the Kuala Lumpur Middle Ring Road 1 in Kuala Lumpur
- Jalan Sultan Iskandar, a major road in Bintulu, Sarawak

=== Others ===
- Iskandar Johor Open, an Asian Tour golf tournament funded by Johor
- Iskandar Malaysia, formerly the Iskandar Development Region
- Kota Iskandar (formerly Johor State New Administrative Centre (JSNAC)) is an administrative centre for the Government of Johor located at Iskandar Puteri
- Kem Iskandar, a Commando military camp in Mersing
- Iskandar Puteri, a planned city which was formerly known as Nusajaya
- Taman Iskandar, a housing estate near Pasir Pelangi, Johor Bahru
- Sultan Iskandar Deep Sea Park, a deep sea park in Pulau Mensirip, Mersing.
- Pertandingan Menembak Piala Sultan Iskandar

One of his grandsons (the son of his second son, Abdul Majid), Mahmood Iskandar, was named after him. Some of his children and grandchildren are also similarly named after his forebears, notably his older son, Ibrahim, who was named after the Sultan's grandfather, Sultan Ibrahim. Sultan Iskandar also followed his grandfather's and father's footsteps of using the royal monogram "S.I.". The monogram's letters represent the initials of their title and names respectively.

== Honours ==
=== Johor honours ===
- Second Class (DK II, 8.5.1959), First Class (DK I, 28.10.1959) and Grand Master of the Royal Family Order of Johor
- First Class (SPMJ, 28.10.1967) and Grand Master of the Order of the Crown of Johor
- Knight Grand Commander of the Order of the Loyalty of Sultan Ismail (28.10.1975, SSIJ)
- Sultan Ibrahim Coronation Medal (PSI 1st class)
- Star of Sultan Ismail (BSI 1st class)
- Sultan Ismail Coronation Medal (1960)

=== National and Sultanal honours ===
- Malaysia (as Yang di-Pertuan Agong)
  - Recipient of Order of the Royal Family of Malaysia (DKM) (1984)
  - Recipient (1987) and Grand Master (1984-1989) of the Order of the Crown of the Realm
  - Grand Master (1984-1989) of the Order of the Defender of the Realm
  - Grand Master (1984-1989) of the Order of Loyalty to the Crown of Malaysia
  - Grand Master (1984-1989) of the Order of Merit of Malaysia
  - Grand Master (1984-1989) of the Order of Loyalty to the Royal Family of Malaysia
- Kelantan
  - Recipient of the Royal Family Order of Kelantan (DK) (1984)
- Kedah
  - Recipient of the Royal Family Order of Kedah (DK) (1985)
- Negeri Sembilan
  - Member of the Royal Family Order of Negeri Sembilan (DKNS) (1985)
- Pahang
  - First Class Member of the Family Order of the Crown of Indra of Pahang (DK I) (1990)
- Perlis
  - Recipient of the Perlis Family Order of the Gallant Prince Syed Putra Jamalullail (DK)
- Terengganu
  - Member of the first class of the Family Order of Terengganu (DK) (1982)
- Selangor
  - First Class of the Royal Family Order of Selangor (DK I) (1985)
- Sabah
  - Grand Commander of the Order of Kinabalu (SPDK) – Datuk Seri Panglima (1972)
- Malacca
  - Grand Commander of the Premier and Exalted Order of Malacca (DUNM) – Datuk Seri Utama (1988)

=== Foreign honours ===
- Brunei
  - First Class of the Family Order of Laila Utama (DK) – Dato Laila Utama (1972)
  - Recipient of the Royal Family Order of the Crown of Brunei (DKMB) (1988)
- Germany
  - Grand Cross Special Class of the Order of Merit of the Federal Republic of Germany
- Indonesia
  - Star of the Republic of Indonesia 1st Class (1987)
- Jordan
  - Grand Cordon with Brilliants of the Supreme Order of the Renaissance
- Mali
  - Grand Cross of the National Order of Mali (6 May 1985)
- South Korea
  - Grand Order of Mugunghwa (03 November 1988)
- Thailand
  - Knight of the Order of the Rajamitrabhorn (KRM) (1985)

== Ancestry ==
Sultan Iskandar is a fourth generation descendant of Sultan Abu Bakar, who in turn was the son of Temenggong Daeng Ibrahim, the Temenggong of Johor.^{[η]} In turn, some of Daeng Ibrahim's patrilineal ancestors were also Temenggongs of Johor serving under their respective sultans. It is from this ancestral heritage that the name of his dynasty, the Temenggong dynasty, comes from. The Temenggong dynasty is also related to the prior ruling Bendahara dynasty as genealogical records show that Sultan Abdul Jalil IV was also a direct patrilineal ancestor of Sultan Iskandar.

Ancestry tree of Sultan Iskandar

Sayyid Abdullah Al-Aidrus (from Hadhramaut) (Note: Institusi Bendahara: Permata Melayu yang Hilang: Dinasti Bendahara Johor-Pahang, Othman, pg 24 "...Acheh yang berasal dari keluarga Naqib (ketua golongan Sayyid) di Hadramaut, Yaman, iaitu Sayyid Zainal Abidin bin Sayyid Abdullah Al 'Aidrus ke dalam keluarga Tun Jenal Bendahara Sekudai (putera Tun Seri Lanang) sebagai menantu telah membawa suatu era baru dalam sejarah pemerintahan keluarga bendahara Johor Lama yang merupakan pewaris kepada keluarga bendahara-bendahara Melaka.")	Achinese princess
Sayyid Zainal-Abidin Al-Aidrus	Kaishi (from Kota Tinggi) (Note: A History of Johore (1365–1941) (1992), pg 195)
Maharaja Sri Diraja of Johor	Daughter of Orang Kaya Derma of Muar
Sultan Mahmud Shah II (from the Malacca-Johor dynasty) (Note: The validity of this marriage is disputed. See A History of Johore (1992), pg 195)	Puteri Bakal	-	Bendahara Tun Habib Abdul Majid	-	Sayyid Ja'afar Al-Aidrus (Dato Pasir Diraja of Muar)
Che Nusamah	Sultan Abdul Jalil Riayat Shah IV	Lady from noble family (Note: A History of Johore (1365–1941) (1992), pg 54)	Sultan Tun Zainal Abidin (1st Sultan of Terengganu) (Note: A Portrait of Malaysia and Singapore (1978), pg 102)
Daing Parani (from Sulawesi)	Tengku Tengah	Sultan Sulaiman Badrul Alam Shah (Bendahara Dynasty)	Bendahara Tun Abbas	-
Raja Maimunah	Temenggong Tun Abdul Jamal	Raja Indrabongsu (Tun Hassan)	Bendahara Tun Abdul Majid (Held the post of Temenggong before he became Bendahara)
Temenggong Daeng Abdul Hamid (Daing Kechil)	Tun Khatijah	Engku Muda (Muhammad) Bulang
Sultan Hussein Shah of Johor	Temenggong Abdul Rahman	Encik Yah
Sultan Ali of Johor	Temenggong Tun Daeng Ibrahim (Note: The title Tun is an ancient Malay title used to refer to people of royal lineage. In modern Malaysia it is the highest title bestowed upon commoners by the rulers. The title Daing (also spelled Daeng) is a Buginese title; Temenggong Ibrahim inherited this title from his matrilineal Buginese ancestors. Malaysia in Focus Mackie, pg 157) (Daing Ronggek) (Note: Sejarah Johor (1980), pg 211)	Encik Ngah	Mads Johansen Lange	Nonna Sangnio (Ong Sang Nio)
Sultan Abu Bakar of Johor (held the title of Temmengong and Maharaja before he was proclaimed Sultan)	Sultanah Zubaidah (Cecilia Catherina Lange)	Bendahara Tun Koris (son of Tun Abdul Majid)
Sultan Ibrahim of Johor	Sultanah Ungku Maimunah	Tunku Mariam (married Sultan Mahmud of Pahang)	Tun Ali (Note: Not to be confused with Bendahara Tun Ali (the son of Mani Purindan), the Bendahara of Melaka and the uncle of Muzaffar Shah of Malacca. Sĕjarah Mĕlayu: Or Malay Annals, Brown, pg 51)
Sultan Ismail of Johor	Sultanah Ungku Tun Aminah	Tun Mutahir (Note: Not to be confused with Tun Mutahir of Malacca, who lived in the 15th to 16th centuries. Tun Mutahir of Pahang lived during the 19th century.)	Sultan Wan Ahmad of Pahang (previously Bendahara) (Note: Federation of Malaya Official Year Book (1962), pg 26)
Tunku Abdul Jalil	Tunku Abdul Rahman (Note: Died in infancy.)	Sultan Iskandar of Johor	Tunku Kalthum Maimunah	Sultan Mahmud of Pahang	Sultan Abdullah of Pahang

== See also ==
- 1993 amendments to the Constitution of Malaysia
- List of alleged and confirmed crimes committed by members of the Johor royal family
- Monarchies of Malaysia

== Footnotes ==
α. Al-Mutawakkil Alallah (also spelled in Arabic as Motawakkil Alallah), which means "He who puts his trust in God" is an Islamic title used by the Sultan. (Najeebabadi, pg 465)

β. In Islamic cultures, the title Al-Marhum means "to one whom mercy has been shown. This is used for Muslim rulers who are deceased. (Schimmel (1989), pg 59)

γ. ^{a} ^{b} ^{c} His first name, Mahmud, is also sometimes spelled as Mahmood by some sources. Bowker-Saur, pg 297

δ. In Malaysian royalty, ibni means "son of" in English, derived from the Arabic term "ibn. Most laymen would otherwise use the term "bin" to denote "son of" in their names. Anglo-American Cataloguing Rules (1978), pg 390

ε. Section B Planning and Implementation, Part 3 Physical Planning Initiatives, CHAPTER 13, Johor Bahru City Centre, Iskandar Malaysia, pg 6, "... This was followed later by the 21st Sultan of Johor – Sultan Abu Bakar (1862–1895) who laid the foundation for developing Johor into a modern state. ..." NB: Sultan Abu Bakar of Johor is the great-grandfather of Sultan Iskandar.

ζ. On Sultan Iskandar's 69th birthday, various companies and organisations published congratulatory advertisements wishing him well for the birthday. In these advertisements, the Sultan was addressed by his honorary titles and name: Duli Yang Maha Mulia Baginda Al Mutawakkil Alallah Sultan Iskandar Ibni Almarhum Sultan Ismail, D.K. Sultan Dan Yang Dipertuan Bagi Negeri Dan Jajahan Takluk Johor Darul Ta'zim. (His first name "Mahmud" was not mentioned.) Advertisements, 8 April 2001, pg 2–3, 5–7, 9, 11, 13, 15, 17–19, New Sunday Times Special (Sultan of Johor's Birthday)

η. The Temenggong is a high-ranking Malay official in ancient times, who is responsible to the Sultan. The duty of the Temenggong is to maintain law and order within the kingdom. In the case of Johor during the 19th century, the Sultan's powers were gradually diminished over the decades and it was under Temenggong Daeng Ibrahim when his authority supersedes those of the Sultan, effectively becoming Johor's paramount ruler. (Sardesai (1989), pg 58)

== Citations ==
Regnal titles
Preceded by Ahmad Shah of Pahang (Sultan of Pahang)	Yang di-Pertuan Agong (King of Malaysia); 1984–1989	Succeeded by Sultan Azlan Shah (Sultan of Perak)
Preceded by Sultan Ismail	Sultan of Johor; 1981–2010	Succeeded by Sultan Ibrahim Ismail
