= List of alleged and confirmed crimes committed by members of the Johor royal family =

List of crimes committed by Johorean royalties

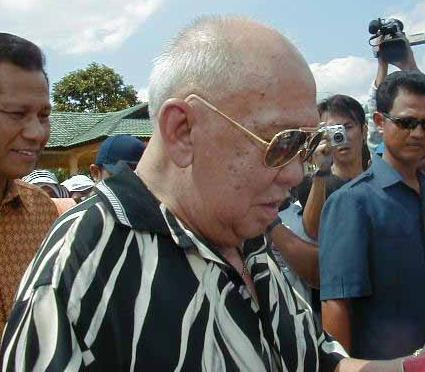
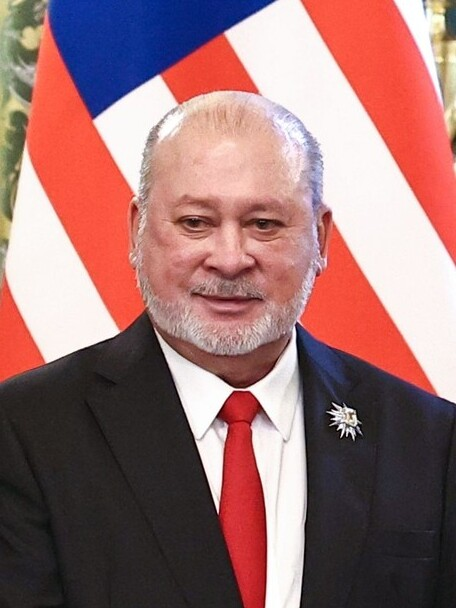
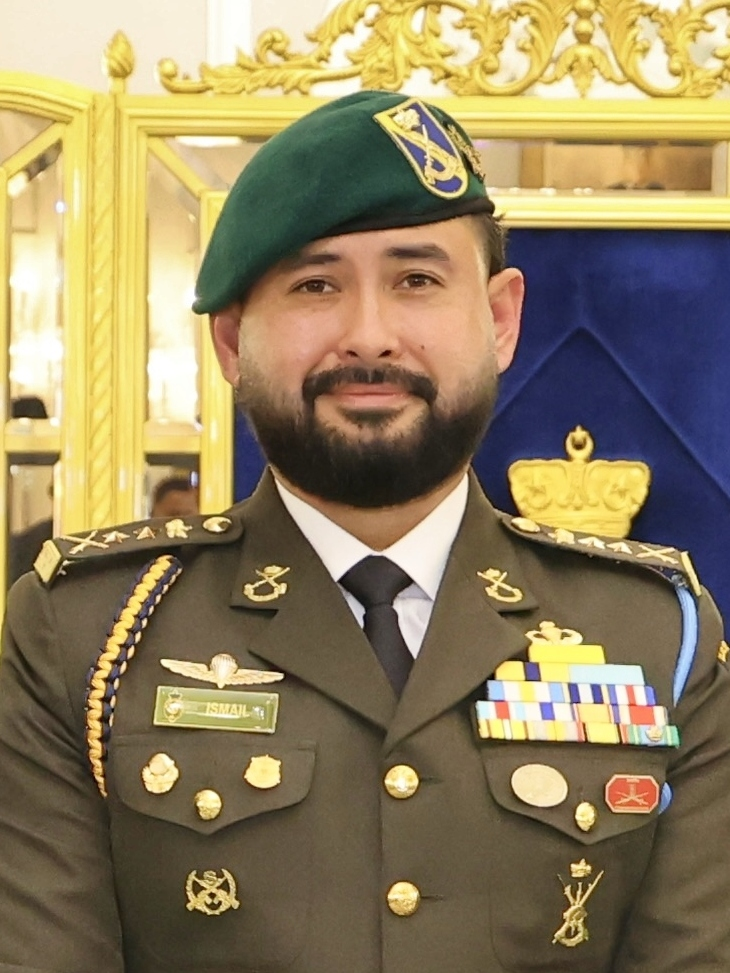
Top, bottom left, bottom right:
- Sultan Iskandar
- Sultan Ibrahim Iskandar
- Tunku Ismail Idris

During the 1993 constitutional crisis in Malaysia and as a fallout of the Gomez incident, which culminated in the removal of royal immunity of all Malaysian monarchs in March 1993, alleged and confirmed criminal misconducts of the Johor royal family were reported by the Malaysian media, under the auspices of the Malaysian federal government led by Prime Minister Mahathir Mohamad.

Sultan Iskandar Ismail of Johor, who was also the 8th Yang di-Pertuan Agong, was alleged to have committed 15 crimes between 1972 and 1992. His son, Sultan Ibrahim Iskandar of Johor, who is the current Sultan of Johor since 2010 and the 17th Yang di-Pertuan Agong, was also alleged to have committed several crimes before 1993. Other Johor royalties such as Tunku Abdul Majid, Tunku Abdul Samad Archibald, Tunku Mishal Shahrin, and Tunku Ismail Idris—the current crown prince of Johor—were accused of physical assault.

== List of alleged and confirmed crimes ==
=== Sultan Iskandar Ismail ===
Sultan Iskandar was also known as Tengku Mahmood Iskandar when he was the Raja Muda of Johor, before ascending to the throne of Sultan of Johor in 1981. He was the King of Malaysia from 1984 to 1989. He died on 22 January 2010.

No.	Incident	Date of incident	Police action / Court sentence	Final outcome of the case	Source
1.	Allegedly confining a police officer in a dog kennel for pursuing a privileged fugitive into his palace.	1961	Unknown	Allegedly led to the deprivation of his Crown Prince title by his father Sultan Ismail, at the insistence of Deputy Prime Minister Abdul Razak.	
2.	Causing hurt by spraying tear gas on two Malaysian Indian men, Francis Joseph Puthucheary and Puthenpurakai Joseph a/l Verghese, who had overtaken his car on the road.	5 March 1972	At Sessions Court, he was charged for two counts of assault. He was bound over with RM300 for each charges and avoided conviction. This sentence was maintained by the High Court.	Unknown	
3.	Punching and caning a customs officer, Narendran a/l Manickam, who did not reply his question on why his car was prevented from being repaired at an automobile assembly plant.	13 March 1972	At Sessions Court, he was charged for one count of assault. He was initially bound over for RM600 and avoided conviction. At the High Court, he was convicted and sentenced to a RM500 fine.	Unknown	
4.	Slapping, dragging, and beating Engku Zaki and Engku Mohsin with a polo club, and subsequently spraying tear gas on them and Engku Mohsin's wife, Tengku Zakiah binti Tengku Mohamed Yusoff—granddaughter of Sultan Ismail Nasiruddin of Terengganu—for using his name to avoid customs duties.	29 April 1972	At Sessions Court, he was charged with three counts of assault. He was initially bound over for RM2,000 on the first charge, and RM1,000 for the second and third charges, and avoided conviction. At the High Court, he was convicted on all three charges and sentenced to a total of RM2,000 fine.	Unknown	
5.	Causing grevious hurt to a person in Johor Bahru. Nature of case undisclosed.	6 December 1975	A police report was made. The offence was compounded (i.e., converted into a fine) with the consent of Court.	Unknown	
6.	Shooting and killing an escaping Chinese man, Teo Ah Bah, whom he deemed to be a smuggler, after he spotted the man on his private aircraft and landed the plane at a polo ground.	15 October 1976	Convicted of culpable homicide not amounting to murder by the High Court and sentenced to 6 months jail and RM6,000 fine on 17 April 1977.	Pardoned by his father, Sultan Ismail on 24 April 1977.	
Ascending to the throne of Sultan of Johor as Sultan Iskandar on 11 May 1981
7.	Ordered for a businessman, Daeng Baha Ismail bin Daeng Ahmad, to be brought to his palace in handcuffs by police, and then repeatedly beat the man on his hands, palms, legs, chest, back and buttocks in the presence of other Johorean royalty.	4 June 1983	A civil suit was filed against Sultan Iskandar in April 1986 at the Kuala Lumpur High Court with the help of Karpal Singh. The suit was rejected by both the High Court and the Supreme Court.	Courts rejected the civil suit due to royal immunity accorded to him.	
8.	Slapped and punched Captain Suhaimi and Sergeant Mohd Nor who were said to have conducted acrobatic flights dangerously with a helicopter and without Sultan Iskandar's order.	12 April 1987	Unknown	Unknown	
9.	Striking a golf caddy in his head with his golf club for laughing at the Sultan's missing shot. Four days later, the caddy fell into a coma and subsequently died at Kuala Lumpur Hospital.	July 1987	None, no police report was made.	Free from any charges due to royal immunity accorded to him.	
10.	Striking Mohd Shah Huari @ Rodari, who attempted to greet him by kissing his hand, with a golf club. Mohd Shah collapsed, suffering head wounds which required 12 stitches.	9 February 1988	None, no police report was made.	Free from any charges due to royal immunity accorded to him.	
11.	Punching and slapping two DAP Johor state assemblymen, Pang Hok Liong and Wong Peng Sheng, during the opening ceremony of the Johor state legislative assembly for wearing a black suit instead of the all-white ceremonial suit. Sultan Iskandar also poked Wong in his legs with his sheathed ceremonial sword.	20 June 1991 (Note: At p. 29 of the Parliament hansard it is stated that the Johor state assembly incident happened on 12 June 1991, but later at p. 34 it placed the date of the same incident at 20 June instead. 20 June 1991 is taken as the correct date as contemporary news report shown that the opening ceremony of the Johor assembly was held on 20 June 1991.)	None, no police report was made.	Free from any charges due to royal immunity accorded to him.	
12.	Slapping three DAP Johor state assemblymen, Pang Hok Liong, Wong Peng Sheng and Lim Wan Show after summoning them to his Bukit Serene palace. The incident occurred in the presence of the Johor Police Chief and no action was taken by him. (Note: At p. 29 of the Parliament hansard it's said that the three assemblymen were slapped by Sultan Iskandar at the palace. However, Wong Peng Seng, as reported by The Straits Times and New Straits Times on 3 Feb 1993, did not mention any assault had happened to them at the palace, but instead said the Sultan had apologised to them during their meeting at the palace.) (Note: The credibility of this incident was however disputed by DAP MP Tan Seng Giaw in Parliament. See Parliamentary Hansard p. 29.)	21 June 1991 (Note: At p. 29 of the Parliament hansard, the Bukit Serene palace incident is said to have happened on 20 June 1991, however Wong Peng Seng, as reported by both The Straits Times and New Straits Times on 3 Feb 1993, said the palace meeting happened on the day after the opening ceremony, thus placing the Bukit Serene incident date at 21 June 1991.)	None, no police report was made.	Free from any charges due to royal immunity accorded to him.	
13.	Pressing his fingers on Pontian district kadi, Haji Abdul Karim Mohd Yusof, who mispronounced his name as Sultan Mahmood instead of Sultan Iskandar during a prayer, with his son, Ibrahim Iskandar, striking the kadi with a wooden prayer board in his face afterwards.	16 July 1991	None, no police report was made.	Free from any charges due to royal immunity accorded to him.	
14.	Ordered Muar police chief, Ali bin Muhamad and Abdul Rahman from the Security Unit to do push-ups as he was displeased with the security arrangement at his Muar palace that had let a Chinese man in to meet him.	1 October 1991	None, no police report was made.	Free from any charges due to royal immunity accorded to him.	
15.	Beating Corporal Saad at Pasir Gudang Circuit, whom he accused of having a secret affair with his daughter, Tunku Noraini Fatimah.	26 April 1992	None, no police report was made.	Free from any charges due to royal immunity accorded to him.	
16.	Punching hockey coach Douglas Gomez in his face, ribs and stomach for criticising the withdrawal of Johor hockey teams, thereby triggering the "Gomez incident".	30 November 1992	Police report was made on 6 December 1992. Police recorded Sultan Iskandar's statement over the case on 15 December 1992.	Free from any charges due to royal immunity accorded to him. Resulted in the 1993 constitutional amendment that removed all royal immunity in Malaysia.	

=== Sultan Ibrahim Iskandar ===
Sultan Ibrahim Iskandar is the eldest son of Sultan Iskandar and the current Sultan of Johor since 2010. He has also been the King of Malaysia since 2024.

No.	Incident	Date of incident	Police action / Court sentence	Final outcome of the case	Source
1.	After the car carrying Raja Zarith Sofiah, wife of Ibrahim Iskandar, collided with a taxi which resulted in Raja Zarith suffering an injury near her eyebrows, Ibrahim rushed to the scene and slapped the driver of the police escort car and threw his police cap into the sea. The taxi driver was also punched by Ibrahim. Later at the hospital, Ibrahim also slapped a policeman and kicked in his genitals.	15 February 1986	None, no police report was made.	Unknown	
2.	Allegedly raped an unnamed women at the Millinium disco of the Johor Bahru Holiday Inn Hotel.	8 March 1990	None, no police report was made.	Unknown	
3.	Kicking Pang Hok Liong in his legs at the opening ceremony of Johor state legislative assembly, after his father Sultan Iskandar has slapped and punched Pang and Wong.	20 June 1991	None, no police report was made.	Unknown	
4.	Striking the Pontian district kadi, Haji Abdul Karim, with a wooden prayer board in his face for mispronouncing his father's name during a prayer.	16 July 1991	None, no police report was made.	Unknown	

=== Tunku Abdul Majid ===
Tunku Abdul Majid is the younger son of Sultan Iskandar Ismail and half-brother of Sultan Ibrahim Iskandar.

No.	Incident	Date of incident	Police action / Court sentence	Final outcome of the case	Source
1.	Stopping and hitting nightclub worker Ahmad Syukri bin Yusof with a plastic flower vase holder.	31 October 1991	A police report was made.	Unknown	
2.	Stopping a Chinese youth, Chua Huo Chew (or Chua Hua Chu) behind Johor Bahru Pacific Bank and kicking him in his face for four times.	10 November 1991	A police report was made.	Unknown	
3.	Assaulting Perak hockey goalkeeper Jaafar Selvarajah Veloo after Perak won 4-2 over Johor during the 4th SUKMA Games.	10 July 1992	Police report was made on 30 July 1992 and Abdul Majid was banned for five years by the Malaysian Hockey Federation on 18 October 1992. All criminal charges were dismissed after the prince reached an RM1,000 out-of-court settlement with the victim on 26 January 1993.	Indirectly caused the Gomez incident, which resulted in the 1993 constitutional amendments.	

=== Tunku Abdul Samad Archibald ===
Tunku Abdul Samad bin Tunku Mohd Archibald is the nephew of Sultan Iskandar and cousin of Sultan Ibrahim.

No.	Incident	Date of incident	Police action / Court sentence	Final outcome of the case	Source
1.	Allegedly attacked a waiter, Mohamad Rizal Hussain and his friend, Sazali Ahmad with a hammer, whom he accused were disturbing his girlfriend. Rizal suffered injuries on his left ear, eyes and left thumb that required 4 stitches while his friend Sazali suffered injuries to his mouth.	19 September 1992	First police report made on 19 September 1992 was retracted after receiving threats from Tunku Samad. Another police report was made on 22 September 1992. Rizal was interviewed by police on 30 January 1993.	Unknown	
2.	Allegedly hitting his relative, Tunku Alam Shah Tunku Abdul Rahman at his right shoulder with a pool cue, and hitting Tunku Alam Shah again in his right leg with an iron rod at JB Sentral police station an hour later.	21 April 2005	He was charged for two counts of assault on 26 October 2007. He pleaded not guilty and was allowed RM1,000 bail for each charge.	Unknown	

=== Tunku Mishal Shahrin ===
Tunku Mishal Shahrin bin Tunku Ibrahim is a second cousin of Tunku Ismail Idris.

No.	Incident	Date of incident	Police action / Court sentence	Final outcome of the case	Source
1.	Allegedly involved or assisted in a violent assault against Hafiz Hatim, a Fly FM DJ, at The Rootz nightclub located at Lot 10 in Bukit Bintang.	2011	Unknown	Unknown	
2.	Allegedly pulling Mikael Adam Mohd Rafee Michel (a rapper by the stage name of SonaOne) out of his car outside of Lot 10 in Bukit Bintang, then repeatedly punching him until he fell to the ground. Mikael Adam later lost consciousness after he was stomped on the head by Tunku Mishal Shahrin.	13 April 2012	A police report was made between 13 and 14 of April 2012 and investigation was launched.	Unknown	
3.	Allegedly involved in a fight with other golfers at Seri Selangor Golf Club.	February 2025	Unknown	Unknown	

=== Tunku Ismail Idris ===
Tunku Ismail Idris is the eldest son of Sultan Ibrahim and the current crown prince of Johor (Tengku Mahkota Johor) since 2010.

No.	Incident	Date of incident	Police action / Court sentence	Final outcome of the case	Source
1.	Allegedly assaulting, abducting and threatening Tunku Nadzimuddin Tunku Muzaffar (a member of the Negeri Sembilan royal family) with a firearm pointed at his head and allowing his bodyguards to beat Sham Shuddhuha, a friend of Tunku Nadzimuddin, until he fell unconscious and lost two teeth. The two victims were then confined in a hotel room until police arrived.	24 October 2008	Police report was filed on 26 October 2008. Police recorded statements from 41 persons.	No further action was taken by the police or the Attorney General of Malaysia.	
2.	Allegedly punching Evaldo Rodrigues Goncalves Cardoso in the face and making death threats towards Fabio Flor De Azavedo, while his bodyguards kicked coach Stefano Impagliazzo in his private parts. The three individuals were members of the T-Team football club that played against Johor Darul Ta'zim.	1 February 2014	Multiple police reports were filed on 2 February 2014 and investigation was carried out by police.	No further action was taken by the police or the Attorney General of Malaysia.	

== See also ==
- 1993 amendments to the Constitution of Malaysia
- Sultan of Johor
- Monarchies in Malaysia
- Crime in Malaysia
- 2024 Faisal Halim acid attack
