= Sultan Iskandar Mosque =

Mosque in Johor Bahru, Johor, Malaysia

- Masjid Sultan Iskandar
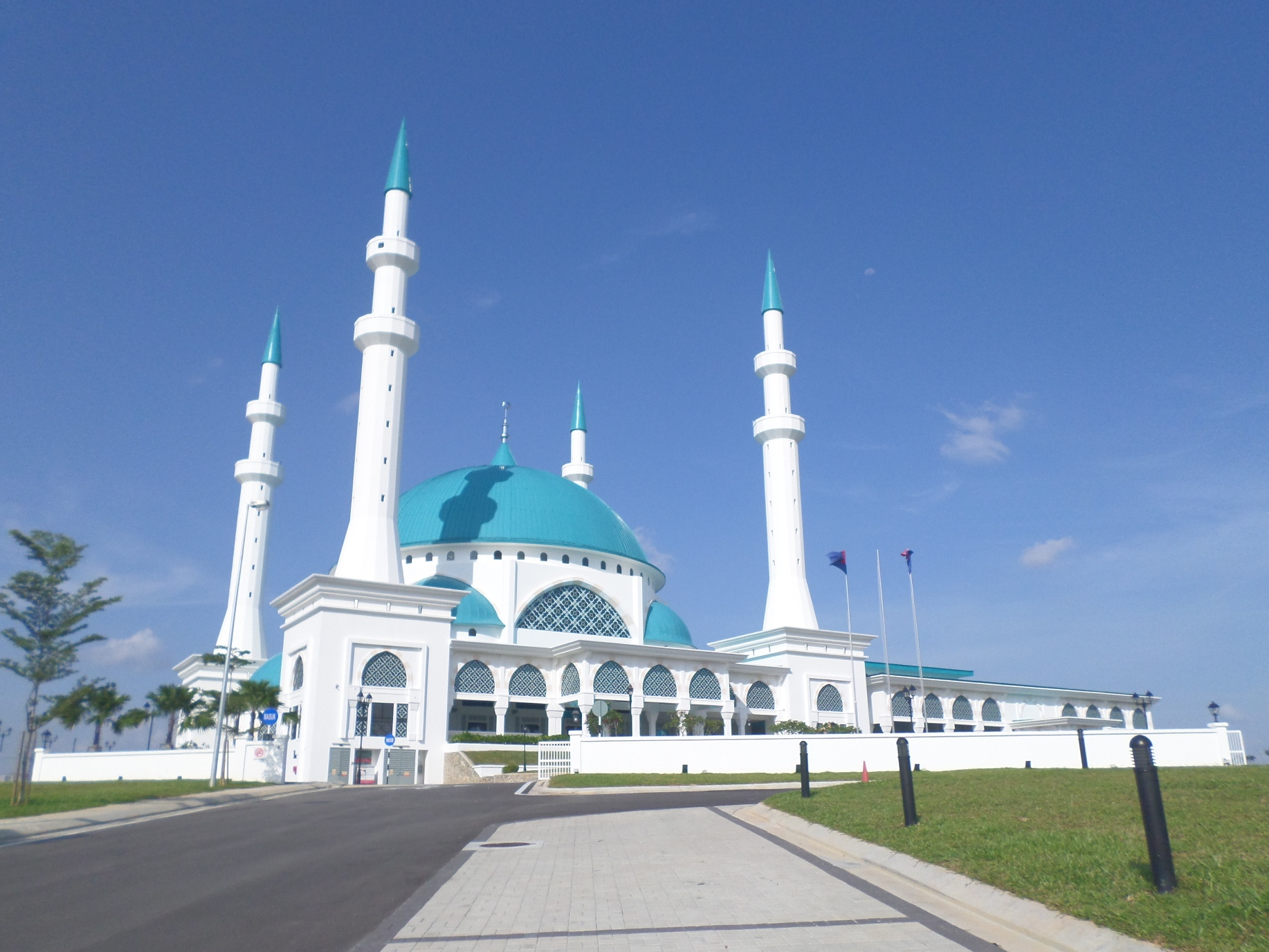

- Location within Johor

Religion
- Affiliation: Islam
- Branch/tradition: Sunni

Location
- Location: Johor Bahru, Johor, Malaysia
- State: Johor
- Country: Malaysia
- Interactive map of Sultan Iskandar Mosque
- Coordinates: 1°33′38.1″N 103°44′13.7″E

Architecture
- Type: Mosque
- Style: Ottoman
- General contractor: Johor Land Berhad
- Completed: 2015

Specifications
- Dome: 1
- Minaret: 4

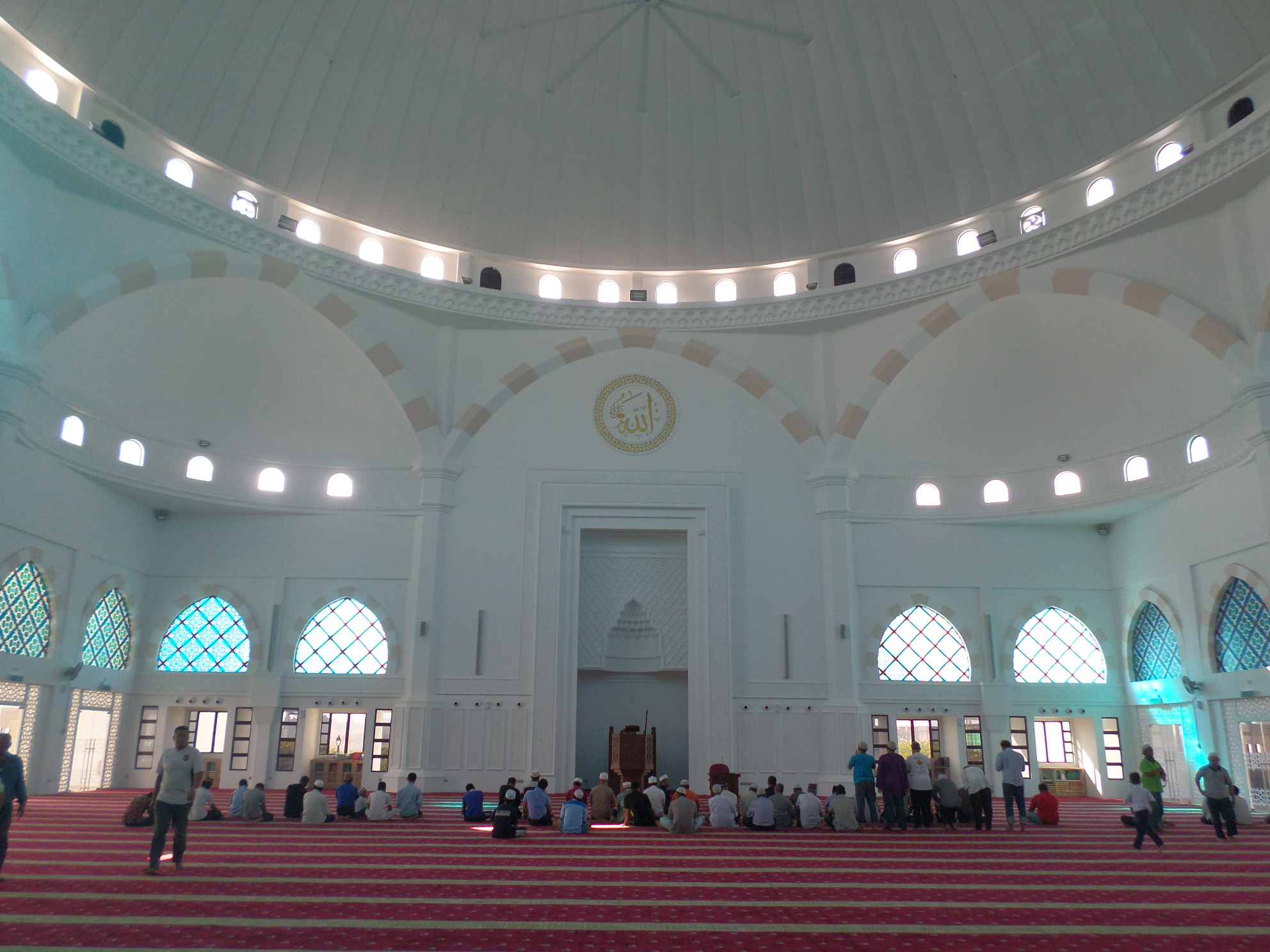
Bandar Dato' Onn Mosque prayer hall

The Sultan Iskandar Mosque (Malay: Masjid Sultan Iskandar) is a mosque located at Bandar Dato' Onn, Johor Bahru District, Johor, Malaysia. The mosque was named after the late 24th and fourth Sultan of Johor, Almarhum Sultan Iskandar ibni Almarhum Sultan Ismail.

== History ==
The mosque was built by Johor Land Berhad, and currently being managed by Waqaf An-Nur Corporation Berhad, both are subsidiaries of Johor Corporation (JCorp). It was initially known as Bandar Dato' Onn Mosque. Construction began from 2012 and was completed in 2015. The mosque was officially opened on 8 April 2016 by the Tunku Mahkota of Johor, Tunku Ismail Idris ibni Sultan Ibrahim in conjunction of his late grandfather Sultan Iskandar's birthday.

== Architecture ==
Ottoman Style mosque.

== Transportation ==
The mosque is accessible by Muafakat Bus route P-111.

== See also ==
- Islam in Malaysia
