= 2024 Faisal Halim acid attack =

Acid attack on Faisal Halim

- Faisal after the acid attack at Kota Damansara mall on 5 May 2024
- Location: Kota Damansara, Petaling Jaya, Malaysia
- Date: 5 May 2024
- Attack type: Acid attack
- Deaths: 0
- Injuries: 1 (Faisal Halim)
- Perpetrator: Unknown

On 5 May 2024, Malaysian footballer Faisal Halim was attacked with acid at a shopping mall in Kota Damansara, Petaling Jaya. The attack resulted in significant injuries and received widespread attention.

== Background ==
Faisal Halim is a professional footballer who plays for Selangor F.C. and has represented the Malaysian national football team. Faisal's acid attack comes after another Malaysian footballer, Akhyar Rashid, was injured after being attacked by 2 robbers.

== Acid attack ==
On 5 May 2024, Faisal was attacked while leaving a shopping mall in Kota Damansara. Police were informed at 5:51 pm. A CCTV footage shows a man with a black shirt and hat waiting behind a black car while watching Faisal walk towards his car, the man splashed acid on him multiple times. The suspect later fled with another man waiting with a motorcycle not far from the incident scene. The motive behind the attack remains unclear as of November 2024.

== Aftermath ==
Faisal suffered burns to his neck, shoulder, hands and chest. He later underwent 4 surgeries in a private hospital.

After recovering, Faisal returned to the pitch in a game for Selangor against Kelantan where Selangor secured a 2–0 win. Faisal played his longest appearance since the acid attack in a game in an AFC Champions League Two match against Cebu F.C. where they won 1–0.

== Investigation ==
In a statement on May 19, 2024, the police released a composite sketch of the suspect. The police later found 5 of the 8 fingerprints on the scene to be incomplete. On 8 May 2025, Faisal Halim's legal team announced that the investigation into the acid attack had been officially classified as "No Further Action" (NFA) by the Attorney-General's Chambers (AGC). The decision, communicated through a letter dated 18 February 2025, stated that police were unable to identify any suspects or establish any credible leads despite their efforts. Faisal’s legal team, Messrs Mohd Ashraf, Nik Zarith & Co, expressed disappointment with the outcome and indicated that they would petition the Attorney-General, Mohd Dusuki Mokhtar, to review and potentially reopen the case.

The classification of the case as NFA drew criticism, with Pas Youth leader Afnan Hamimi Taib Azamudden describing it as a "dark mark in the history of national sports" and urging the government to provide a detailed explanation in Parliament. Afnan highlighted concerns about public safety and athlete protection, calling for transparency from the Royal Malaysia Police and the AGC. Lawyer Mohd Haijan Omar emphasized that a case classified as NFA can still be reopened if new evidence emerges, noting that the AG has the discretion to direct further investigations. He also questioned the inability of law enforcement to resolve a high-profile case involving a serious offence under Section 326 of the Penal Code, punishable by up to 20 years' imprisonment.

== Reaction ==
The Selangor State Legislative Assembly passed a motion condemning the attack put forward by Abbas Salimi Azmi.

Selangor F.C., Faisal's club, condemned the attack and subsequently withdrew from the 2024 Piala Sumbangsih. They were subsequently fined RM100,000 of their actions. The fine was reduced to RM60,000 after Sultan Sharafuddin of Selangor condemned it.

Faisal expressed gratitude when former Prime Minister of Malaysia Mahathir Mohamad paid a visit to his house.

Manchester United F.C. players André Onana and Alejandro Garnacho extended their heartfelt wishes to Faisal.

Billboards were seen on major highways in Klang Valley used the hastag #JusticeForFaisalHalim, 2 months after the attack.

German club Borussia Dortmund expressed solidarity with Faisal over the acid attack.

== See also ==
- List of alleged and confirmed crimes committed by members of the Johor royal family
