= Senario =

Malaysian sketch comedy troupe

- Also known as: Senario
- Origin: Malaysia
- Genres: Pop, Blues, Malaysian Traditional
- Years active: 1996–2013; 2019–present (Senariounion)
- Labels: Ambang Klasik (1997–2002), TV3 (2005)
- Members: Senario: 1. Azlee Jaafar (1996–present); 2. Abdul Wahid (1996–present); 3. Lan Pet Pet (1996-2016, 2024- present); 4. Ilya Buang (1996–1998, 2006–2008, 2016-present); 5. Saiful Apek (1998–2004, 2016 -present); 6. Yassin Yahya (1999–2002, 2016-present)
- Past members: Shamsul Ghau Ghau (1996): Farouk Hussain (1996); Hamdan Ramli (1996–1998, 2006–2008, 2019–2024)

Senario is a Malaysian sketch comedy troupe responsible for their titular show (also called Senario) that had aired on TV3 from June 1996 to 2013, in which due to its popularity has also spawned a franchise of comedy films featuring its cast.

== Members ==
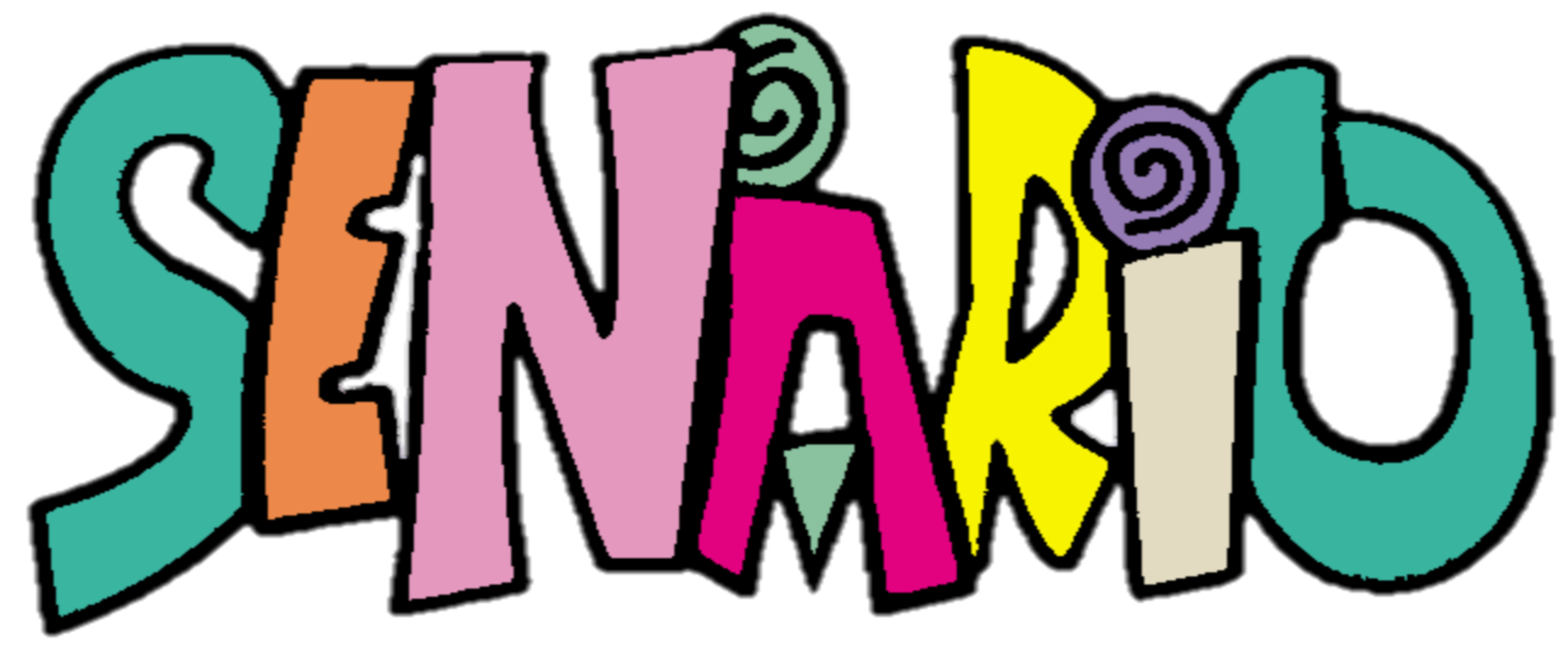
Logo

The troupe started off as finalists and one of the host of the TV3-run talent show Sinaran Pasport Kegemilangan that took place in the early 1990s with 7 members in its inception. Some of its original cast had undergone several replacements during its 17-year-long run; whereas only Mazlan Ahmad (stage name: Lan Pet-Pet), Azlee Jaafar and Abdul Wahid (stage name:Wahid) remain as the core members of the troupe.

- Azlee Jaafar (1996–present)
- Abdul Wahid (1996–present)
- Lan Pet Pet (1996–2016, 2024–present)
- Ilya Buang (1996–1998, 2006–2008, 2016–present)
- Saiful Apek (1998–2004, 2016–present)
- Yassin Yahya (1999–2002, 2016–present)
- Shamsul Ghau Ghau (1996)
- Farouk Hussain (1996)
- Hamdan Ramli (1996–1998, 2006–2008, 2016–2024)

== History ==
The Senario group was established in 1996 as a result of a combination of 6 participants of the Sinaran Pasport Kegemilangan together with the host of the TV competition programme, Farouk Hussain. The Farouk-hosted competition was running in early 90's and in 1994 season, Shamsul Ghau Ghau was crowned as the champion and Mazlan Ahmad became the runner-up.

The group was originally composed of Farouk Hussain as the leader of the Senario group, and members of the group Wahid, Ilya, Hamdan, Shamsul, Azlee and Mazlan. The name of the group, Senario is taken from the idea of Farouk who called them a "noisy" group, "senang riuh" (English: getting loud easily) and eventually became Senario after being re-inspired by Shamsul Ghau Ghau. They were entrusted with the success of their own TV program, also named Senario in June 1996 with four introductory episodes featuring comedy characters. Apparently, the comedy sitcom has been well received and they earned their permanent spot at TV3 channel.

Shortly after, Farouk and Shamsul left Senario and the group moved with five members until eventually Ilya and Hamdan also resigned around 1998. Then Senario welcomed their fourth and fifth entries with the introductions of Saiful Apek and Yassin Yahya. Senario reached its zenith as a comedian group with five members consisting of Wahid, Azlee, Lan, Yassin and Saiful Apek. However, in 2002, Yassin withdrew from Senario due to internal disagreements between him and other members, and the controversy of his alleged narcotics use.

Saiful Apek also resigned from Senario because he wanted to focus more on his solo career in 2004, which marked the hiatus in Senario as a whole. After 2005, Azlee, Lan and Wahid were the only members of Senario and they were still active until the group's second hiatus in 2013. In the intervening years, the group has gained a reputation for shaping and paving the paths for future generations of Malaysian comedians.

In 2014, Senario was awarded the Anugerah Komedi Sepanjang Zaman. All members of the Scenario Group were present at the Anugerah Lawak Warna 2014 for the reception of the recognition.

In 2022, Wahid, Azlee, and former group members Hamdan, Ilya, Saiful Apek and Yassin starred in the film Jaga Jaga Senariounion. It was the first Senario film since Senario The Movie Ops Pocot (2011). However, this film did not feature Mazlan.

Throughout their careers, Senario was the first legal group that competed in Anugerah Juara Lagu and managed to reach the final stages of the competition in 2001 and 2006. This marked a history in Malaysia's music industry because Senario managed to give something other singers could not offer since all of their songs have lyrics that consist the elements of advice not only comedy in nature.

Their achievements in the field of singing is proven as a great success for Senario itself, which subsequently opened many business opportunities, deals and ventures in food and beverages industry by using Senario as a brand.

Senario signed many film franchise deals throughout their careers with different film directors such as Aziz M. Osman who directed 5 films i.e., Senario The Movie (1999), Senario Lagi (2000), Lagi-Lagi Senario ( 2001), Senario XX (2005) and Senario Pemburu Emas Yamashita (2006). Other Senario films are Lang Buana (2003) directed by Mamat Khalid, Senario The Movie: Episode 1 (2008) and Senario The Movie: Episode 2 - Beach Boys (2009) directed by Ahmad Idham, Senario Asam Garam (2010) directed by Hatta Azad Khan and Senario The Movie Ops Pocot (2011) directed by Ismail 'Bob' Hashim.

Senario is an influence on Malaysian comedy. The group's weekly sketches featured dialogue that was repeated by the public in daily conversations. Their comedy is noted for its appeal to a broad Malaysian audience.

== Media ==
=== Album ===
- Senario (1997)
- Senario 2 (1998)
- Senario The Movie Soundtrack
- Senario 3 - Seantero (2000)
- Lagi Lagi Senario Soundtrack
- Senario Can Mali Can (2001)
- Senario 4 (2001)
- Senario 5 (2005)

=== Television ===
- Senario (1996–2013)
- Senario Misteri Bamboo (2011–2012)

=== Film ===
- Senario The Movie (1999)
- Senario Lagi (2000)
- Lagi-Lagi Senario (2001)
- Lang Buana (2003)
- Senario XX (2005)
- Senario Pemburu Emas Yamashita (2006)
- Senario The Movie : Episode 1 (2008)
- Senario The Movie : Episode 2 - Beach Boys (2010)
- Senario Asam Garam (2010)
- Senario The Movie Ops Pocot (2011)
- Jaga-Jaga Senariounion (2022)

=== Reality Show ===
- Senario Gelak Kaya (2004) - as host
