= Tunku Abdul Majid =

Prince of Johor, Malaysia

- Tunku Aris Bendahara of Johor
- Born: 20 July 1970 (age 56); Johor Bahru, Johor
- Spouse: Tunku Teh Mazni binti Tunku Yusuf (m. 2006)
- Issue: Tunku Mahmood Iskandar; Tunku Aisha Menjalara Iskandar; Tunku Abdul Mateen Idris Ismail Ibrahim Iskandar
Names
- Tunku Abdul Majid Idris Ismail Ibrahim ibni Tunku Mahmood Iskandar
- House: Temenggong
- Father: Sultan Iskandar
- Mother: Sultanah Zanariah
- Religion: Sunni Islam

Tunku Abdul Majid ibni Almarhum Sultan Iskandar Al-Haj (né Tunku Abdul Majid Idris Ismail Ibrahim ibni Tunku Mahmood Iskandar, born 20 July 1970) is a member of the Johor royal family who is the Tunku Aris Bendahara of Johor. Tunku Majid has served in honorary positions in national sports associations, including as President of the Malaysian Golf Association and as Deputy President of the Malaysian Hockey Confederation. An incident in 1992 in which Tunku Majid, known for his violent temper, assaulted a hockey player led to the ending of legal immunity for Malaysia's nobility.

He is the half-brother of the Sultan of Johor and the incumbent Yang di-Pertuan Agong of Malaysia, Sultan Ibrahim Ismail.

== Biography ==
Tunku Majid was born on 20 July 1970 at the Sultanah Aminah Hospital in Johor Bahru as the second son of Sultan Iskandar by his second wife Sultanah Zanariah. In his youth, he began his early education at Temenggong Abdul Rahman Primary School and then continued his secondary education at English College Johore Bahru. Subsequently, he pursued his higher education in Business Management at MENLO College, Palo Alto in San Francisco, United States. Tunku Majid also took part in international sports tournaments in the 1980s as a youth, particularly windsurfing, hockey and golf. In 1989, after his uncle, Tunku Abdul Rahman passed, the incumbent Tunku Bendahara of Johor, Tunku Majid was appointed by his father to succeed Tunku Abdul Rahman on 23 September 1992.

On 13 January 2006, Tunku Majid married Tunku Teh Mazni binti Tunku Yusuf, a member of Kedah and Kelantan royal family. Tunku Teh's father, Tunku Yusuf is the son of Tunku Temenggong of Kedah, Tunku Muhammad Jewa ibni Sultan Abdul Hamid Halim Shah and her mother, Tengku Embong Suria is the daughter of Tengku Sri Pekerma Raja of Kelantan, Tengku Abdul Majid bin Tengku Besar Tuan Yusuf. They have two sons, Tunku Mahmood Iskandar, whom Tunku Majid named after his father, Sultan Mahmood Iskandar and second son, Tunku Abdul Mateen Idris Ismail Ibrahim Iskandar, and a daughter named Tunku Aisha Menjalara Iskandar.

== Children and their date of birth ==
| Name | Born | Place birth | Age |
|---|---|---|---|
| Yang Mulia Tunku Mahmood Iskandar bin Tunku Abdul Majid Idris Ismail Ibrahim | 3 November 2006 | Johor Bahru, Johor | 20 years |
| Yang Mulia Tunku Aisha Menjalara Iskandar binti Tunku Abdul Majid Idris Ismail Ibrahim | 21 March 2009 | Johor Bahru, Johor | 17 years |
| Yang Mulia Tunku Abdul Mateen Idris Ismail Ibrahim Iskandar bin Tunku Abdul Majid Idris Ismail Ibrahim | 13 November 2015 | Johor Bahru, Johor | 11 years |

== Societal contributions ==
Tunku Majid held the honorary positions of President of the Malaysian Golf Association and Deputy President of the Malaysian Hockey Confederation. In 2008, he proposed the formation of the ASEAN Golf Foundation. Presidents of the golf clubs of the ASEAN countries will take turns to serve as its secretary general. In addition, he was also noted for his contributions to the development of the Malaysian hockey and golf teams. In late 2008, an internal crisis in the administration of these sports associations resulted in Tunku Majid being relieved of his positions.

== Controversies ==
=== Gomez Incident ===
In 1992, Tunku Majid assaulted a hockey player, which culminated in the Malaysia nobility losing immunity from legal prosecution. On 10 July 1992, Tunku Majid assaulted Mohamed Jaafar Selvaraja Mohamed Vello, the goalkeeper of Perak hockey club, after Perak won the match against Tunku Majid's team. Jaafar lodged a police report. Following press reports on the incident, and the Malaysian Hockey Federation banned Tunku Majid from participating in national hockey tournaments for five years.

His father Sultan Iskandar, apparently infuriated by the decision, issued an edict to pressure the Johor education department to enforce a boycott of Johor hockey teams participation in national hockey tournaments. Hockey coaches criticised his decision. Sultan Iskandar, taking Gomez' remarks in offence, ordered Gomez to meet him in November 1992 at Istana Bukit Serene, where he reprimanded and assaulted Gomez. The incident sparked off a standoff between the Malaysian government and members of the royalty after the government proposed changes to review the status of the legal immunity of the rulers.

Tunku Majid went on trial for voluntarily causing hurt, and pleaded not guilty. Court sessions into January 1993 convicted him of deliberately causing hurt and hence made him liable to a jail term and/or a fine, though neither penalties were applied following an official pardon issued by his father.

=== MGA crisis ===
In November 2008, accusations by the Malaysian Golf Association was brought by its members against Tunku Majid for excessive and unethical use of the association's funds. A committee member, Abdul Majid Md Yusoff–an elected committee member who issued the notice of the EGM, in which Tunku Majid responded strongly to his claims. Shortly before an Extraordinary General Meeting was held to decide the fate of Tunku Majid, Tunku Majid said that it was unconstitutional to the vires of the rules of the MGA and pledged to continue serving the association until his term expires the following year, but also expressing that he would not seek re-election to be its association's president. He expressed his decision to boycott the meeting, after seeking legal advice from a lawyer.

The delegates voted in favour of impeaching Tunku Majid as his president. A vote of no confidence against Tunku Majid as President was taken–with 129 delegates voting in favour of his impeachment and 33 against. However, questions were about the technical ambiguity questioned the legitimacy of the meeting, whose views were also supported by former President Thomas Lee and vice-President Zain Yusof. Following the delegation, Tunku Majid expressed that he still believed that he was the President of the MGA. Members of the MGA rebutted by citing provisions within its constitution, and refuted Tunku Majid's claims that the EGM was unconstitutional.

In a surprise move, delegates swiftly elected MGA's vice President Robin Loh in Tunku Majid's place, arguing that its legitimacy as provided by the association's constitution.

== Titles and styles ==
Styles of Tunku Abdul Majid
- Reference style: His Highness
- Spoken style: Your Highness
- Alternative style: Tunku

The full title and style of Tunku Abdul Majid:

His Highness Tunku Abdul Majid Ibni Almarhum Sultan Iskandar Al-Haj, D.K., S.P.M.J., Tunku Aris Bendahara of Johor

== Honours of Tunku Abdul Majid ==
He was awarded :

=== Honours of Johor ===
- First Class of the Royal Family Order of Johor (DK I) (8 April 1996)
- Knight Grand Commander of the Order of the Crown of Johor (SPMJ) – Dato'

== Honours of Tunku Teh Mazni ==
She was awarded :

=== Honours of Johor ===
- Knight Grand Commander of the Order of the Crown of Johor (SPMJ) (11 April 2009) – Datin Paduka

== See also ==
- House of Temenggong
- Ibrahim Iskandar of Johor
- Sultan of Johor
- Monarchies of Malaysia
- List of crimes committed by members of the Johor royal family
