= KK Super Mart =

Malaysian convenience store chain

KK Supermart & Superstore Sdn. Bhd.
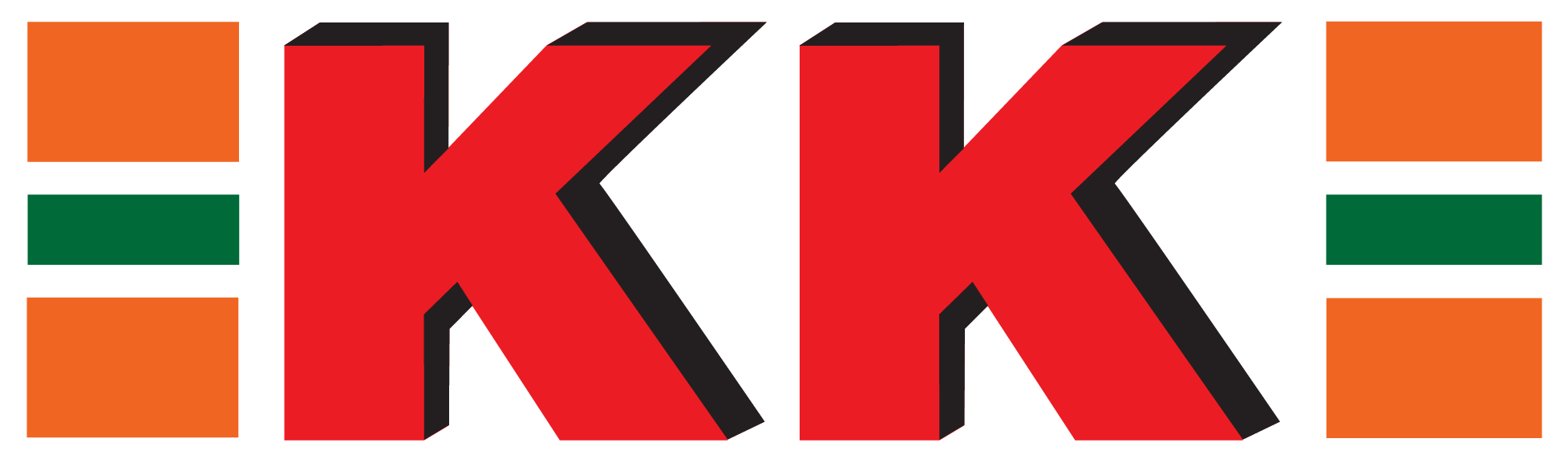

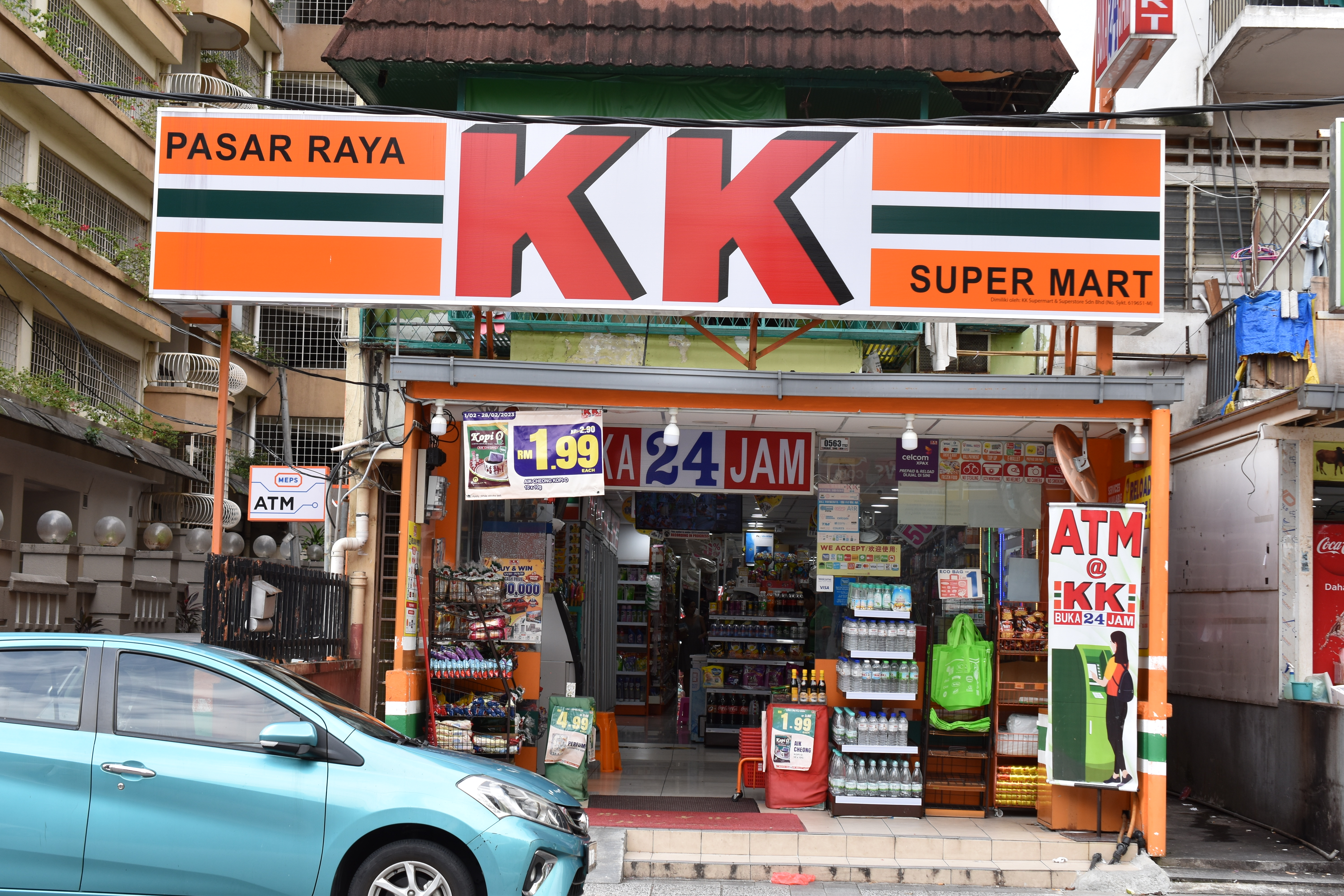
- Front view of KK Super Mart
- Trade name: KK Super Mart
- Type: Private limited company
- Industry: Grocery stores, convenience stores, retail
- Founded: January 2001; 25 years ago in Kuchai Lama
- Founder: Datuk Seri Dr. Chai Kee Kan (蔡志权, CEO and Executive Chairman)
- Headquarters: Menara KK, Tower 6, Maju Link, Jalan Lingkaran Tengah 2, Bandar Tasik Selatan, Kuala Lumpur, Malaysia
- Number of locations: 1000+ (2026)
- Area served: Malaysia, Nepal, India
- Brands: KK Concept Store, KK Food Court, KK Kopitiam
- Parent: KK Group of Companies
- Website: kkgroup.my

KK Supermart & Superstore Sdn Bhd, doing business as KK Super Mart, is a Malaysian convenience store chain owned and operated by KK Group of Companies.

== History ==
Established in 2001, it is named after its founder, Datuk Seri Dr. Chai Kee Kan. The first location of KK Supermart occupied the ground floor of a shoplot at Kuchai Entrepreneurs Park in Kuala Lumpur with an initial capital of only RM 60,000.

It started out by focusing mainly in the Klang Valley region, Putrajaya, Cyberjaya, KLIA2, Malacca and Seremban. KK Super Mart also has branches in other countries such as Nepal and India. In 2019, KK Super Mart had launched its first outlet at a LRT station which was the Kelana Jaya LRT station.

The retailer currently operates 906 outlets with rapidly expanding by average 12 stores a month. The company entered into a partnership in 2019 with UniPin, an Indonesian payment gateway focused on online gaming.

In July 2022, KK Supermart signed a MOU with GS25, a convenience store in South Korea with over 16,000 outlets worldwide. According to their statement, KK Supermart is targeting to open first GS25 in third quarter of 2023 and 500 outlets in the next 5 years. They also will open franchisee opportunity to local business owner who interested to open their own GS25 outlet.

== Controversy ==
=== Socks bearing the word 'Allah' ===
In March 2024, socks bearing the word “Allah” were found to be sold in several outlets of KK Super Mart. Photographs of the offending item went viral online and have triggered backlash from netizens and prominent public figures, with some calling for a boycott of the convenience store. The incident was a sensitive issue within the Muslim community in the country, as it occurred during the holy month of Ramadan. The King of Malaysia was also outraged at it and had requested the authorities to proceed with investigations.
