= KD Tunku Laksamana Abdul Jalil =

Malaysian Battleship

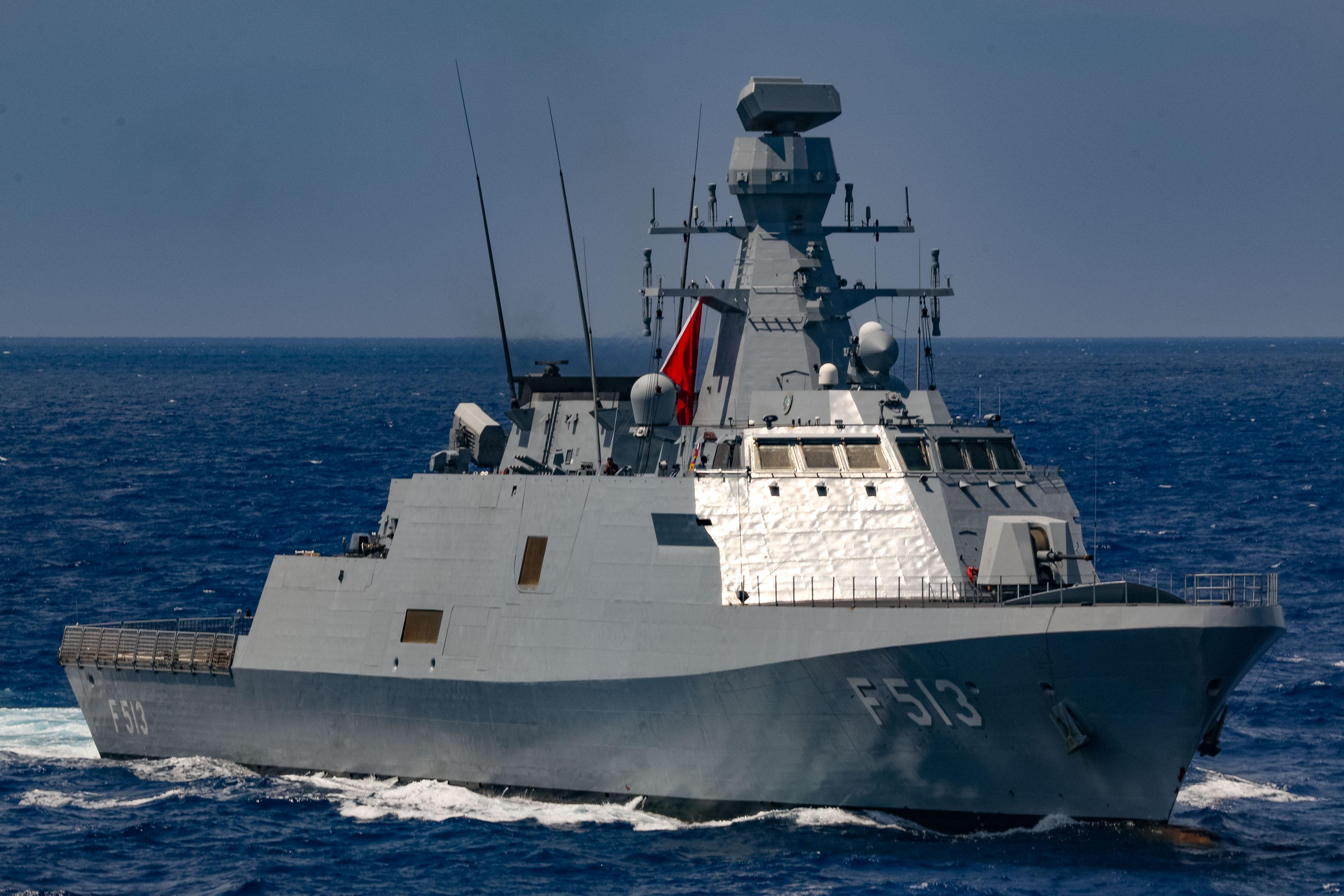
- Ada class of Turkish Navy which is the same design as the KD Tunku Laksamana Abdul Jalil

History

Malaysia
- Name: KD Tunku Laksamana Abdul Jalil
- Namesake: Tunku Abdul Jalil
- Builder: STM
- Laid down: 4 December 2024
- Launched: 24 May 2026
- Identification: Hull number: 141
- Status: Launched

General characteristics
- Class & type: Corvette
- Displacement: 2,400 long tons (2,439 t) full load
- Length: 99.56 m (326 ft 8 in)
- Beam: 14.40 m (47 ft 3 in)
- Draught: 3.90 m (12 ft 10 in)
- Propulsion: 1 gas turbine, 2 diesels, 2 shafts
- Speed: Economy: 15 kn (28 km/h; 17 mph); Maximum: 30 kn (56 km/h; 35 mph)
- Range: 3,500 nautical miles (6,500 km) at 15 knots (28 km/h)
- Complement: 93 including aviation officers, with accommodation up to 106
- Sensors & processing systems: Combat management system: G-MSYS (GENESIS MİLGEM Savaş Yönetim Sistemi); Search radar: Aselsan CENK-S AESA; Weapon control: STING EO Mk2; Communication: SatCom, GPS, LAN, ECDIS/WECDIS, Link 11/16; Navigation: ECPINS-W, ALPER LPI; Integrated platform management system: UniMACS 3000; Others: X-Band radar, Fire control radar
- Electronic warfare & decoys: SIGINT: ARES-2N; Others: Laser/RF systems, ASW jammers, DG, SSTD
- Armament: Guns: 1 × 76 mm (3 in) OTO Melara Super Rapid; 1 × 30 mm (1.2 in) Aselsan SMASH 200/30 RCWS; Anti-air: 16 × K-SAAM in VLS; Anti-ship: 8 × Atmaca
- Aircraft carried: Hangar and platform for: Medium-lift helicopter; Unmanned aerial vehicle
- Aviation facilities: Capability of storing armaments, 20 tons of JP-5 aircraft fuel, aerial refueling (HIRF) and maintenance systems

KD Tunku Laksamana Abdul Jalil is the lead ship of the Littoral Mission Ship Batch 2 of the Royal Malaysian Navy. It was based on the Ada-class corvette built by Turkish company STM. The ship was launched by Queen of Malaysia, Raja Zarith Sofiah and the vessels was named KD Tunku Abdul Jalil, in honour of the late Tunku Abdul Jalil, the Tunku Laksamana of Johor.

== Development ==
The ship was part of the Royal Malaysian Navy’s 15-to-5 Transformation Plan which is to modernising and strengthening the Navy's fleets. Tunku Abdul Jalil was laid down on 4 December 2024 and launched on 24 May 2026 in Turkey.
