= Wedding of Prince Abdul Mateen and Anisha Rosnah =

Bruneian royal wedding (2024)

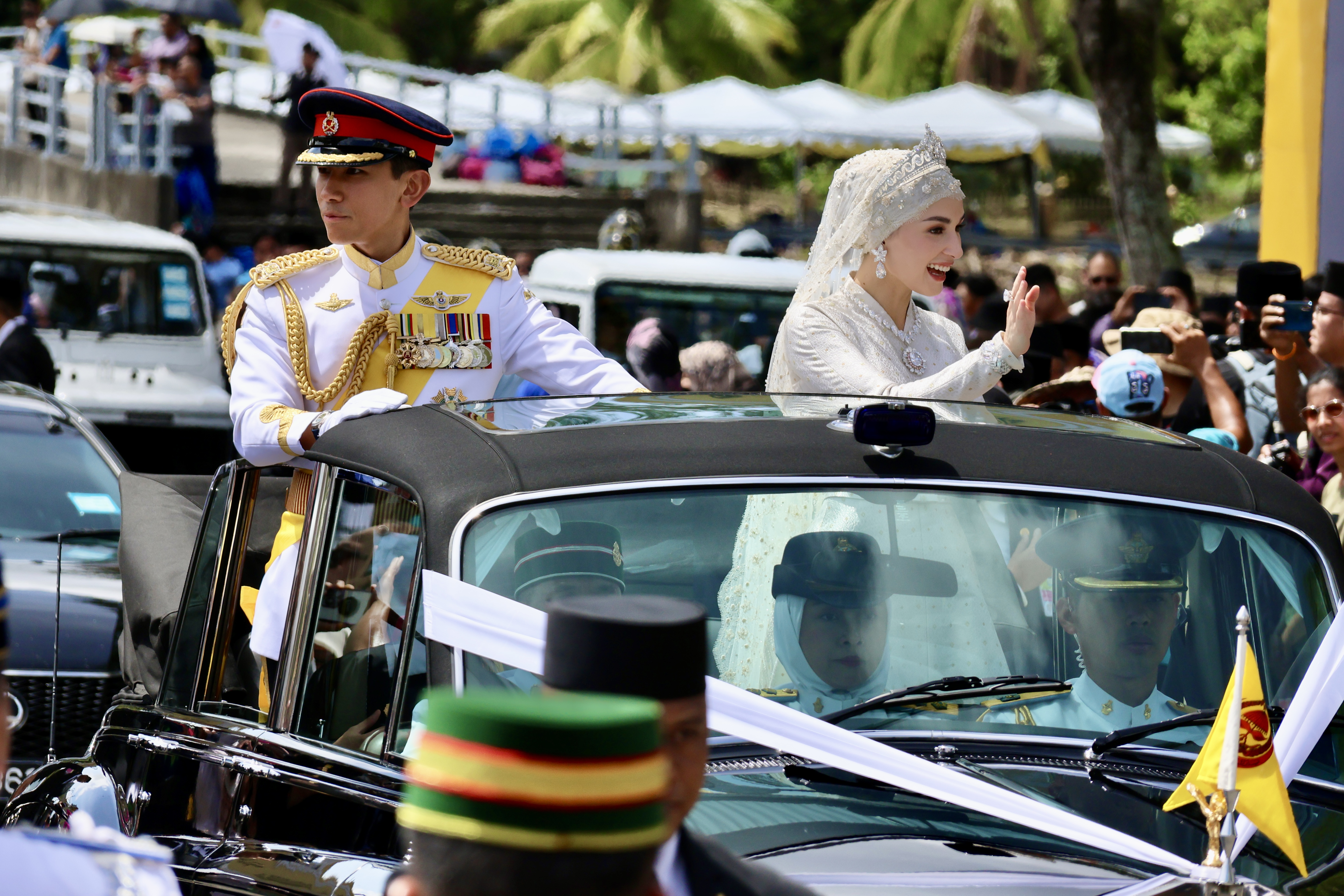
- Prince Mateen and Anisha during the royal procession in Bandar Seri Begawan, January 2024
- Date: 7–16 January 2024
- Venue: Istana Nurul Iman; Omar Ali Saifuddien Mosque
- Location: Bandar Seri Begawan, Brunei
- Type: Royal wedding
- Theme: Malay-Islamic royal ceremony
- Patron: Hassanal Bolkiah
- Participants: Prince Abdul Mateen of Brunei; Anisha Rosnah

The wedding of Prince Abdul Mateen and Anisha Rosnah was held from 7 to 16 January 2024 in Bandar Seri Begawan, Brunei. The ten-day celebration comprised a sequence of traditional Malay-Islamic royal ceremonies, religious rites, a public procession, and a grand state banquet attended by regional heads of state, foreign royalty, and thousands of invited guests.

International media described the event as one of the most elaborate royal weddings in Southeast Asia in recent years, drawing comparisons to other contemporary royal ceremonies in Asia due to its scale, duration, and display of royal regalia.

== Background ==
=== Prince Abdul Mateen ===
Prince Abdul Mateen is the tenth child and fourth son of Sultan Hassanal Bolkiah, the Sultan of Brunei, and Mariam Abdul Aziz. He was born on 10 August 1991 and received his early education in Brunei before continuing his studies in the United Kingdom. He trained at the Royal Military Academy Sandhurst and later served in the Royal Brunei Armed Forces.

The prince has represented Brunei internationally in equestrian sports, particularly polo, including appearances at the Southeast Asian Games. He is also known for his public diplomatic engagements and prominent social media presence, which has contributed to his international profile.

=== Anisha Rosnah ===
Anisha Rosnah binti Adam is a Bruneian entrepreneur and businesswoman. She is the granddaughter of Pehin Dato Isa bin Ibrahim, a former special adviser to the Sultan of Brunei. She has been associated with fashion and lifestyle ventures in Brunei and maintains a relatively private public profile compared to members of the royal family.

Reports indicated that Prince Mateen and Anisha Rosnah had known each other since childhood and began dating in 2018. Their engagement was formally announced in October 2023 by Brunei's Prime Minister's Office.

== Cultural and Constitutional Context ==
Royal weddings in Brunei are conducted according to the national philosophy of Melayu Islam Beraja (Malay Islamic Monarchy), which combines Malay customs, Islamic principles, and monarchical tradition. Ceremonial proceedings are governed by strict court protocol and long-established royal customs that date back centuries.

The wedding ceremonies were overseen by palace officials and religious authorities to ensure conformity with Islamic law and royal tradition. The sequence of rituals reflects both Islamic marital requirements and Malay cultural symbolism.

== Wedding Ceremonies ==
=== Pre-Wedding Ceremonies ===
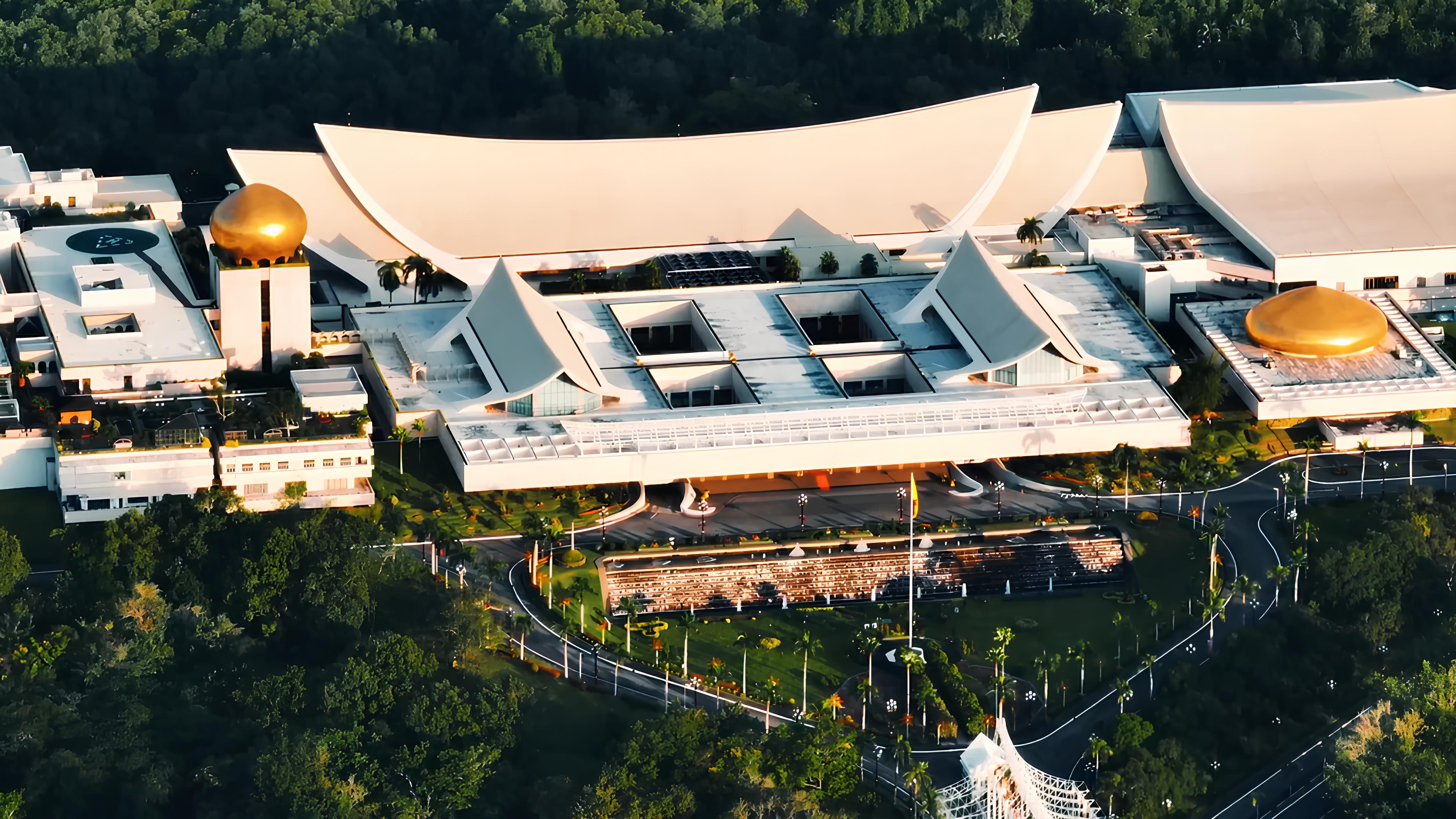
Istana Nurul Iman, Brunei

Celebrations began on 7 January 2024 at Istana Nurul Iman, the official residence of the Sultan of Brunei. The palace, recognized as one of the largest residential palaces in the world, served as the primary venue for ceremonial events.

=== Majlis Istiadat Berbedak Pengantin Diraja ===
Held on 10 January, the Majlis Istiadat Berbedak Pengantin Diraja (Royal Powdering Ceremony) is a key pre-wedding rite in Bruneian royal tradition. During the ceremony, senior members of the royal family applied scented powder and perfumed oils to the hands of the bride and groom. The ritual symbolises purification, blessings, prosperity, and protection from harm.

Participants wore traditional ceremonial attire incorporating gold-threaded textiles and heirloom jewelry. Court musicians performed traditional Malay compositions during the proceedings.

=== Akad Nikah ===
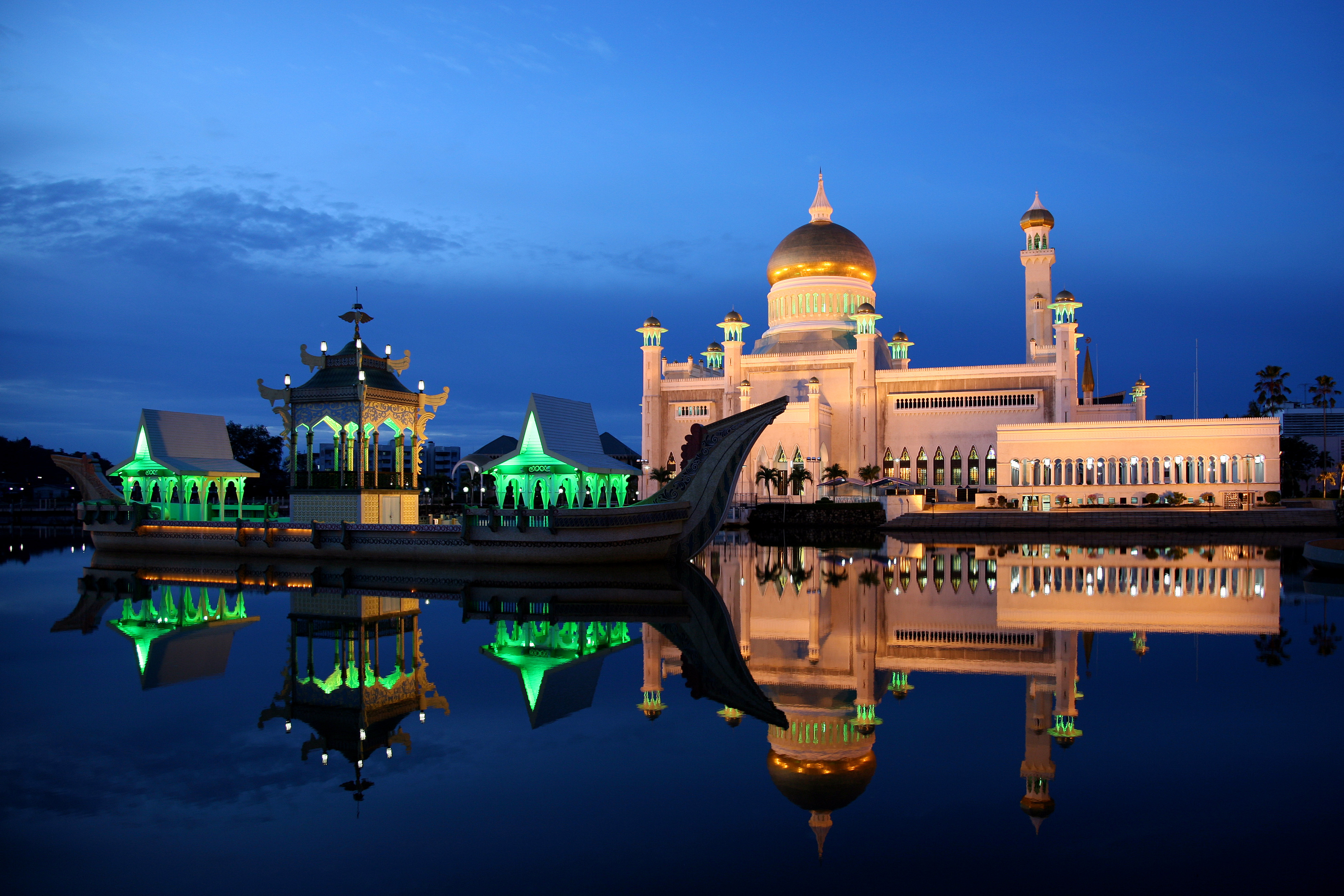
Omar Ali Saifuddien Mosque, where the Akad Nikah took place

The Islamic solemnisation ceremony (Akad Nikah) was held on 11 January 2024 at the Omar Ali Saifuddien Mosque, one of Brunei’s most prominent religious landmarks. The ceremony was officiated by Brunei's State Mufti.

During the ceremony, Prince Mateen recited the marriage vows (ijab kabul) in accordance with Islamic law. The marriage contract was witnessed by senior religious officials and members of the royal family. Following the formal pronouncement, prayers were offered for the couple’s prosperity and harmony.

Anisha Rosnah wore a custom-designed white gown by Teh Firdaus, paired with a diamond tiara. Prince Mateen wore a traditional white baju cara Melayu with royal insignia.

=== Royal Procession ===
On 14 January 2024, a public royal procession was held through the streets of Bandar Seri Begawan. The couple traveled in a ceremonial carriage escorted by members of the Royal Brunei Armed Forces and palace guards in full ceremonial uniform.

Thousands of spectators lined the streets to greet the couple, waving national flags and royal standards. The procession route passed major landmarks in the capital, symbolizing the connection between the monarchy and the people.

=== Majlis Bersanding Pengantin Diraja ===
The Majlis Bersanding (royal seating ceremony) took place at Istana Nurul Iman on 14 January 2024. During this ceremony, the bride and groom were seated on an elevated dais under an ornate canopy, symbolising their new status as husband and wife.

Anisha Rosnah wore a gown by Dior and jewelry loaned from Queen Saleha, including the Flower Diamond Tiara. The ensemble attracted international fashion commentary.

=== Majlis Persantapan Diraja ===
The state banquet (Majlis Persantapan Diraja) marked the culmination of the wedding celebrations. Approximately 5,000 guests attended the banquet at Istana Nurul Iman. The event featured formal speeches, cultural performances, and a multi-course royal menu reflecting Malay culinary heritage.

== Guests ==
=== Foreign royal guests ===
- (Emirate of Ajman) Prince Rashid Bin Humaid Al Nuaimi, prince of Ajman
- Prince Nasser bin Hamad Al Khalifa, prince of Bahrain
- Jigme Khesar Namgyel Wangchuck and Jetsun Pema, King and Queen of Bhutan
- Tunku Idris Iskandar, prince of Johor
  - (Johor) Tunku Tun Aminah Maimunah Iskandariah and Dennis Muhammad Abdullah
- (Jordan) Princess Noor bint Asem and Amr Zedan
- Abdullah of Pahang and Tunku Azizah Aminah Maimunah Iskandariah, King and Queen of Malaysia
  - (Pahang) Tengku Muhammad Iskandar Ri'ayatuddin Shah
  - (Pahang) Tengku Fahad Mua'adzam Shah
- Sultan Nazrin Shah and Tuanku Zara Salim, Sultan and Queen of Perak
- (Saudi Arabia) Prince Mamdouh bin Abdul Rahman Al Saud and Princess Munira
  - (Saudi Arabia) Princess Hanouf bint Mamdouh Al Saud
- Sultan Sharafuddin Idris Shah and Tengku Permaisuri Norashikin, Sultan and Queen of Selangor
- Sultanah Nur Zahirah, Queen of Terengganu
  - Tengku Fatimatuz Zahra, princess of Terengganu

=== Foreign politicians and diplomats ===
- Joko Widodo, President of Indonesia
- Anwar Ibrahim and Wan Azizah Wan Ismail, Prime Minister and former Deputy Prime Minister of Malaysia
- Bongbong Marcos and Liza Araneta Marcos, President and First Lady of the Philippines
- Lee Hsien Loong and Ho Ching, Prime Minister of Singapore and spouse
- Vivian Balakrishnan, Foreign Minister of Singapore

== Music ==
The National Television Programme of Brunei organized a songwriting competition in October 2023 to commemorate the royal wedding. Winning compositions were performed during official broadcasts and public celebrations.

Songwriting and Publishing in Commemoration with the 2024 Royal Wedding
Place	Title	Composer/Lyricist	Performer
First	Renjana Pengantin Diraja	Awang Hazwan Awang Madial	Nur'izzah Haji Hashim
Second	Bahtera Mahligai Mempelai Diraja	Pengiran Mohammad Fauzie Pengiran Zainal Abidin / Mohammad Khairulanwar Mohd. Yassin	Dayangku Nur Fairuz Qashrinasyasya Pengiran Zainal Abidin

== See also ==
- Melayu Islam Beraja
- Istana Nurul Iman
