= Khaleeda Bustamam =

Consort of the Regent of Johor (born 1993)

Khaleeda خالدة

Consort of the Regent of Johor
- Tenure: 28 January 2024 – present
- Predecessor: Raja Zarith Sofiah

Consort of the Crown Prince of Johor
- Tenure: 24 October 2014 – present
- Predecessor: Raja Zarith Sofiah
- Born: Khaleeda binti Bustamam; 16 July 1993 (age 33); Kuala Lumpur, Malaysia
- Spouse: Tunku Ismail (m. 2014)
- Issue: Tunku Khalsom Aminah Sofiah; Tunku Iskandar Abdul Jalil; Tunku Abu Bakar Ibrahim; Tunku Zahrah Zarith Aziyah; Tunku Khadeeja Khayra Iskandariah
Regnal name
- Che' Puan Mahkota Khaleeda Johor
- House: Temenggong (by marriage)
- Father: Bustamam bin Daud
- Mother: Aziyah binti Abdul Aziz
- Religion: Sunni Islam

Che' Puan Mahkota Khaleeda Johor (Jawi: چئ ڤوان مهكوتا خالدة جوهر; née Khaleeda binti Bustamam; born 16 July 1993) is the wife of Tunku Ismail ibni Sultan Ibrahim. Through her marriage, she is known as the Consort of the Regent and Crown Prince of the Malaysian State of Johor.

== Early life ==
Khaleeda binti Bustamam was born on 16 July 1993 at the Kuala Lumpur Hospital in Kuala Lumpur, Malaysia. She is the fifth child of Bustamam bin Daud and Aziyah binti Abdul Aziz. She attended Sekolah Rendah Kebangsaan Taman Seri Gombak in Selangor from 2001 until 2003, where she participated in dance and track & field. She moved to England when her mother served at the Malaysian High Commission in the United Kingdom. While in England she attended St. George's School at Hanover Square before enrolling at Westminster Academy in London in 2004. In 2009, she returned to Malaysia and studied at the Sri Utama School in Kuala Lumpur and graduated in 2010.

She speaks fluent Malay, English, and Spanish.

== Personal life ==
Khaleeda married Tunku Ismail, the Crown Prince of Johor, on 24 October 2014 in a private ceremony at Istana Bukit Serene.

Upon her marriage she was granted the honorific prefix of Che' Puan (equivalent to the English "Lady") as a Crown Prince's consort that was non-royal blood.

She gave birth to their first child and eldest daughter on 25 June 2016. On 14 October 2017 she gave birth to their second child and first son, Tunku Iskandar Abdul Jalil Abu Bakar Ibrahim (the Raja Muda of Johor). She gave birth to their third child and second son who was born on 17 July 2019. On 21 April 2021, she gave birth to their fourth child and second daughter. On 5 April 2026, she gave birth to their fifth child and third daughter.

== Public roles ==
She is the Pro-Chancellor of University of Technology Malaysia and was appointed in 2021. She is also the president of the Malaysian Girl Guides Association for the Johor State Branch.

== Titles and honours ==
Styles of Che’ Puan Mahkota Khaleeda Johor
- Reference style: Her Highness
- Spoken style: Your Highness
- Alternative style: Che' Puan Mahkota

By the royal command of Sultan of Johor, Sultan Ibrahim Ibni Almarhum Sultan Iskandar, the Johor Council of the Royal Court announced on 7 January 2024 that she would be styled Her Highness Che' Puan Mahkota Khaleeda Johor in all official correspondences.

=== Honours of Johor ===
Che' Puan Mahkota Khaleeda Johor was conferred with the following royal honours:

- First Class of the Royal Family Order of Johor (DK I) (23 March 2019)
- Grand Commander of the Order of the Crown of Johor (SPMJ) – Datin Paduka (15 March 2015)
- Grand Commander of the Order of Sultan Ibrahim of Johor (SMIJ) – Datin Paduka (9 April 2026)

== Issue ==
Name	Born	Place birth	Age
Her Highness; Tunku Khalsom Aminah Sofiah Binti Tunku Ismail Idris Abdul Majid Abu Bakar Iskandar	25 June 2016	Hospital Sultanah Aminah of Johor	10 years
His Royal Highness; Tunku Iskandar Abdul Jalil Abu Bakar Ibrahim Ibni Tunku Ismail Idris Abdul Majid Abu Bakar Iskandar, the Raja Muda of Johor	14 October 2017	Hospital Sultanah Aminah of Johor	9 years
His Highness; Tunku Abu Bakar Ibrahim Ibni Tunku Ismail Idris Abdul Majid Abu Bakar Iskandar	17 July 2019	Hospital Sultanah Aminah of Johor	7 years
Her Highness; Tunku Zahrah Zarith Aziyah Binti Tunku Ismail Idris Abdul Majid Abu Bakar Iskandar	21 April 2021	Hospital Sultanah Aminah of Johor	5 years
Her Highness; Tunku Khadeeja Khayra Iskandariah Binti Tunku Ismail Idris Abdul Majid Abu Bakar Iskandar	5 April 2026	Hospital Sultanah Aminah of Johor	6 months 17 days
