= KD Raja Laut =

Malaysia battleship

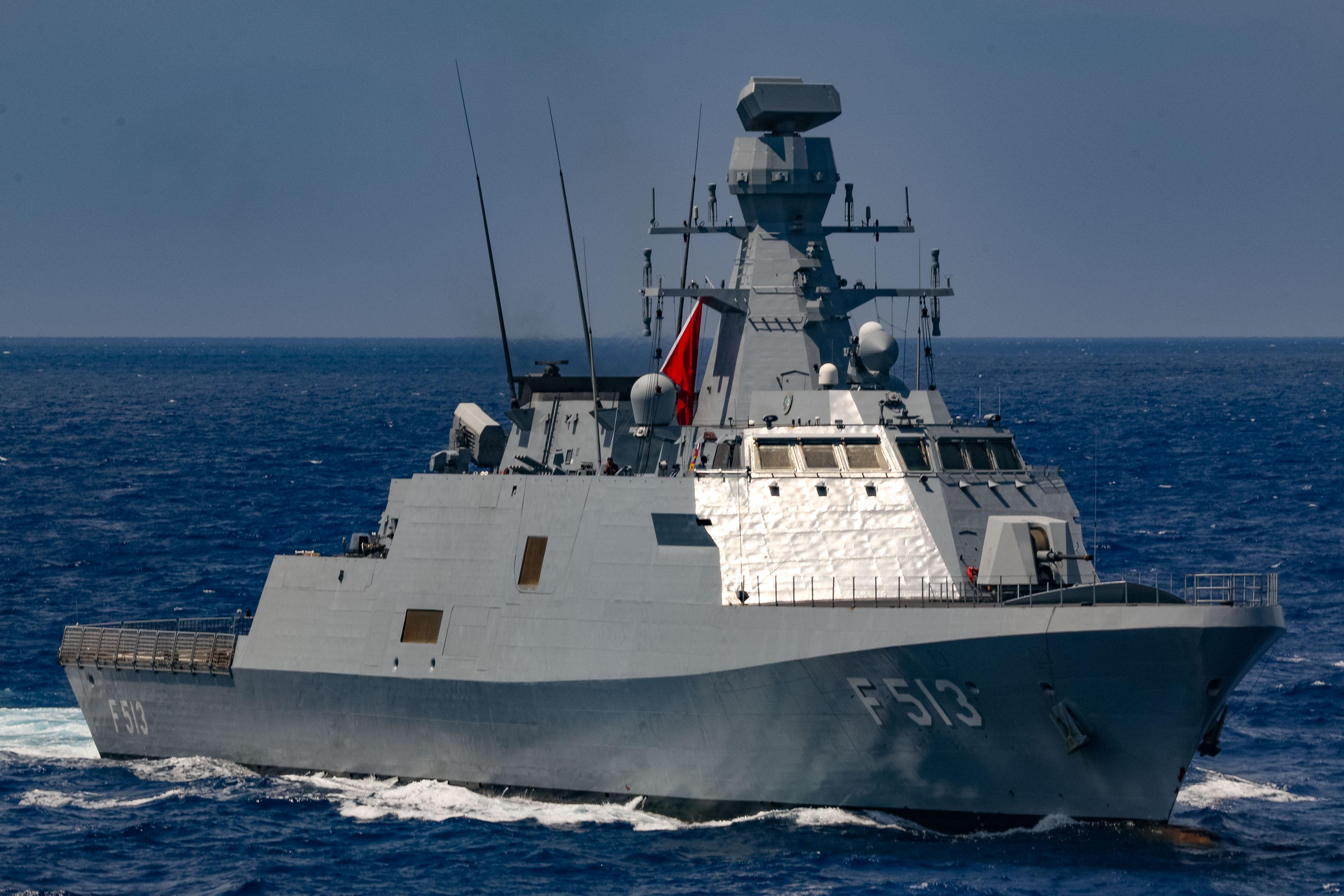
- Ada class of Turkish Navy which is the same design as KD Raja Laut

History

Malaysia
- Name: KD Raja Laut
- Namesake: Raja Laut, son of Sultan Muhammad Shah
- Builder: STM
- Launched: 7 June 2026
- Identification: Hull number: 142
- Status: Launched

General characteristics
- Class & type: Corvette
- Displacement: 2,400 long tons (2,439 t) full load
- Length: 99.56 m (326 ft 8 in)
- Beam: 14.40 m (47 ft 3 in)
- Draught: 3.90 m (12 ft 10 in)
- Propulsion: 1 gas turbine, 2 diesels, 2 shafts
- Speed: Economy: 15 kn (28 km/h; 17 mph); Maximum: 30 kn (56 km/h; 35 mph)
- Range: 3,500 nautical miles (6,500 km) at 15 knots (28 km/h)
- Complement: 93 including aviation officers, with accommodation up to 106
- Sensors & processing systems: Combat management system: G-MSYS (GENESIS MİLGEM Savaş Yönetim Sistemi); Search radar: Aselsan CENK-S AESA; Weapon control: STING EO Mk2; Communication: SatCom, GPS, LAN, ECDIS/WECDIS, Link 11/16; Navigation: ECPINS-W, ALPER LPI; Integrated platform management system: UniMACS 3000; Others: X-Band radar, Fire control radar
- Electronic warfare & decoys: SIGINT: ARES-2N; Others: Laser/RF systems, ASW jammers, DG, SSTD
- Armament: Guns: 1 × 76 mm (3 in) OTO Melara Super Rapid; 1 × 30 mm (1.2 in) Aselsan SMASH 200/30 RCWS; Anti-air: 16 × K-SAAM in VLS; Anti-ship: 8 × Atmaca
- Aircraft carried: Hangar and platform for: Medium-lift helicopter; Unmanned aerial vehicle
- Aviation facilities: Capability of storing armaments, 20 tons of JP-5 aircraft fuel, aerial refueling (HIRF) and maintenance systems

KD Raja Laut is the second ship of the Littoral Mission Ship Batch 2 of the Royal Malaysian Navy. The ship was built by the Turkish company STM based on the Ada-class corvette. Raja Laut was launched by the Queen of Selangor, Tengku Permaisuri Norashikin, on 7 June 2026 in Turkey. It was named after the second son of Sultan Muhammad Shah, who was the third Sultan of Selangor.

== Development ==
Built to meet the RMN's requirements, the ship is equipped with sophisticated sensors and weapons. Installed with K-SAAM and Atmaca missiles, the ship is capable of carrying out two-dimensional warfare which is anti-air and anti-surface warfare respectively. It lacks anti-submarine warfare, as there are no sonar and torpedo launchers installed.
