= KD Tunku Osman Jewa =

Malaysia battleship

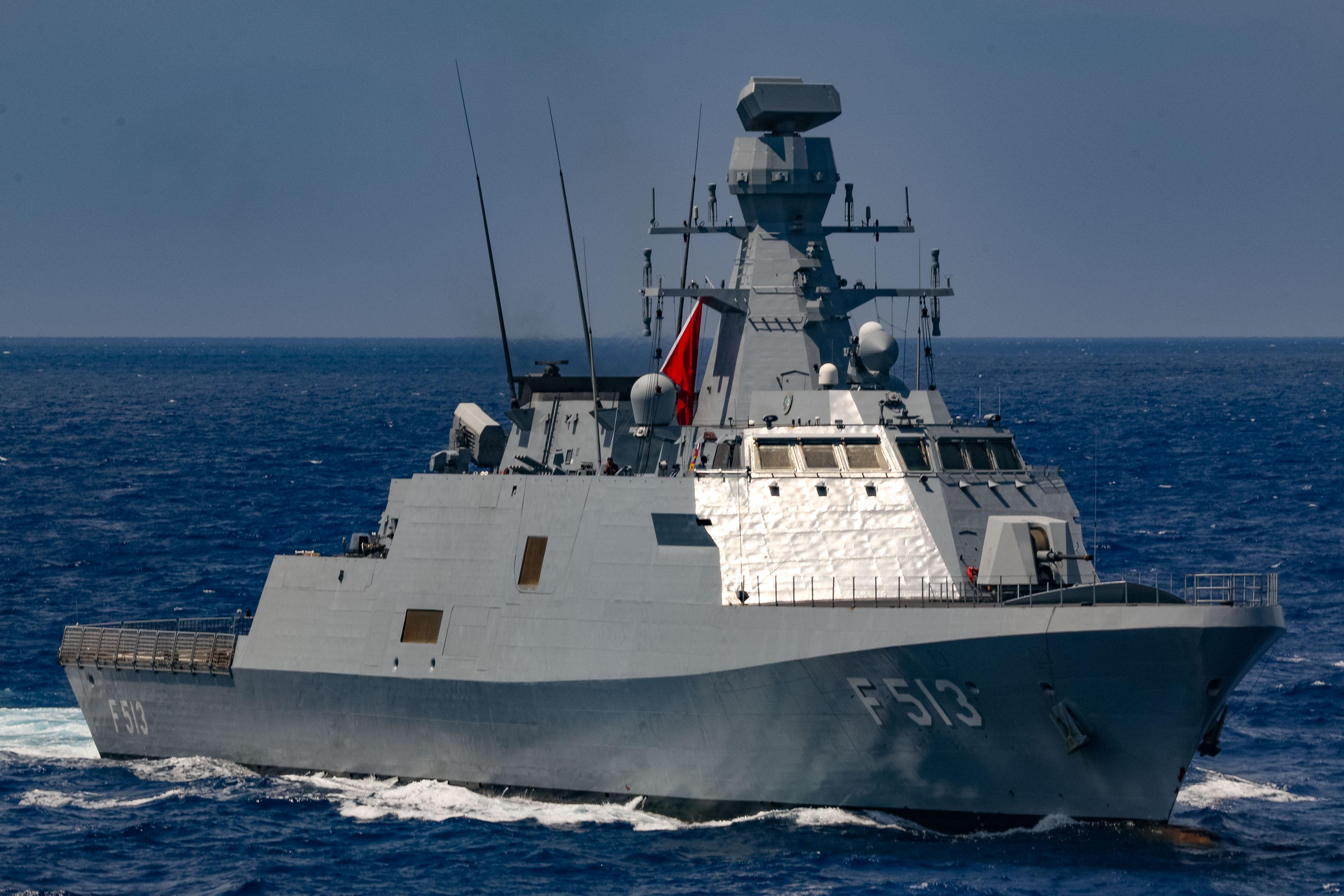
- Ada class of Turkish Navy which is the same design as the KD Tunku Osman Jewa

History

Malaysia
- Name: KD Tunku Osman Jewa
- Namesake: Tunku Osman Jewa
- Builder: STM
- Launched: 9 August 2026
- Identification: Hull number: 143
- Status: Launched

General characteristics
- Class & type: Corvette
- Displacement: 2,400 long tons (2,439 t) full load
- Length: 99.56 m (326 ft 8 in)
- Beam: 14.40 m (47 ft 3 in)
- Draught: 3.90 m (12 ft 10 in)
- Propulsion: 1 gas turbine, 2 diesels, 2 shafts
- Speed: Economy: 15 kn (28 km/h; 17 mph); Maximum: 30 kn (56 km/h; 35 mph)
- Range: 3,500 nautical miles (6,500 km) at 15 knots (28 km/h)
- Complement: 93 including aviation officers, with accommodation up to 106
- Sensors & processing systems: Combat management system: G-MSYS (GENESIS MİLGEM Savaş Yönetim Sistemi); Search radar: Aselsan CENK-S AESA; Weapon control: STING EO Mk2; Communication: SatCom, GPS, LAN, ECDIS/WECDIS, Link 11/16; Navigation: ECPINS-W, ALPER LPI; Integrated platform management system: UniMACS 3000; Others: X-Band radar, Fire control radar
- Electronic warfare & decoys: SIGINT: ARES-2N; Others: Laser/RF systems, ASW jammers, DG, SSTD
- Armament: Guns: 1 × 76 mm (3 in) OTO Melara Super Rapid; 1 × 30 mm (1.2 in) Aselsan SMASH 200/30 RCWS; Anti-air: 16 × K-SAAM in VLS; Anti-ship: 8 × Atmaca
- Aircraft carried: Hangar and platform for: Medium-lift helicopter; Unmanned aerial vehicle
- Aviation facilities: Capability of storing armaments, 20 tons of JP-5 aircraft fuel, aerial refueling (HIRF) and maintenance systems

KD Tunku Osman Jewa is the third ship of the Littoral Mission Ship Batch 2 of the Royal Malaysian Navy built by Turkish company STM. The ship was based on the Ada-class corvette of the Turkish Naval Forces but constructed based on requirement of the Royal Malaysian Navy with the selection of sensors and weapons are both from Turkey and South Korea.

== Development ==
The ship was ordered in 2024 with government-to-government contract worth of approximately USD $530 million. The ship was launched on 9 August 2026 in Turkey by Sultanah Maliha binti Almarhum Tengku Ariff as a Royal Sponsor. The ship bear a name of Tunku Osman Jewa which is the third Armed Forces chief in Malaysian Armed Forces.
