= Anisha Rosnah =

Bruneian royalty (born 1994)

Anisha Rosnah binti Adam انيشا روسنه
- Pengiran Anak Isteri (Princess Consort) Anisha
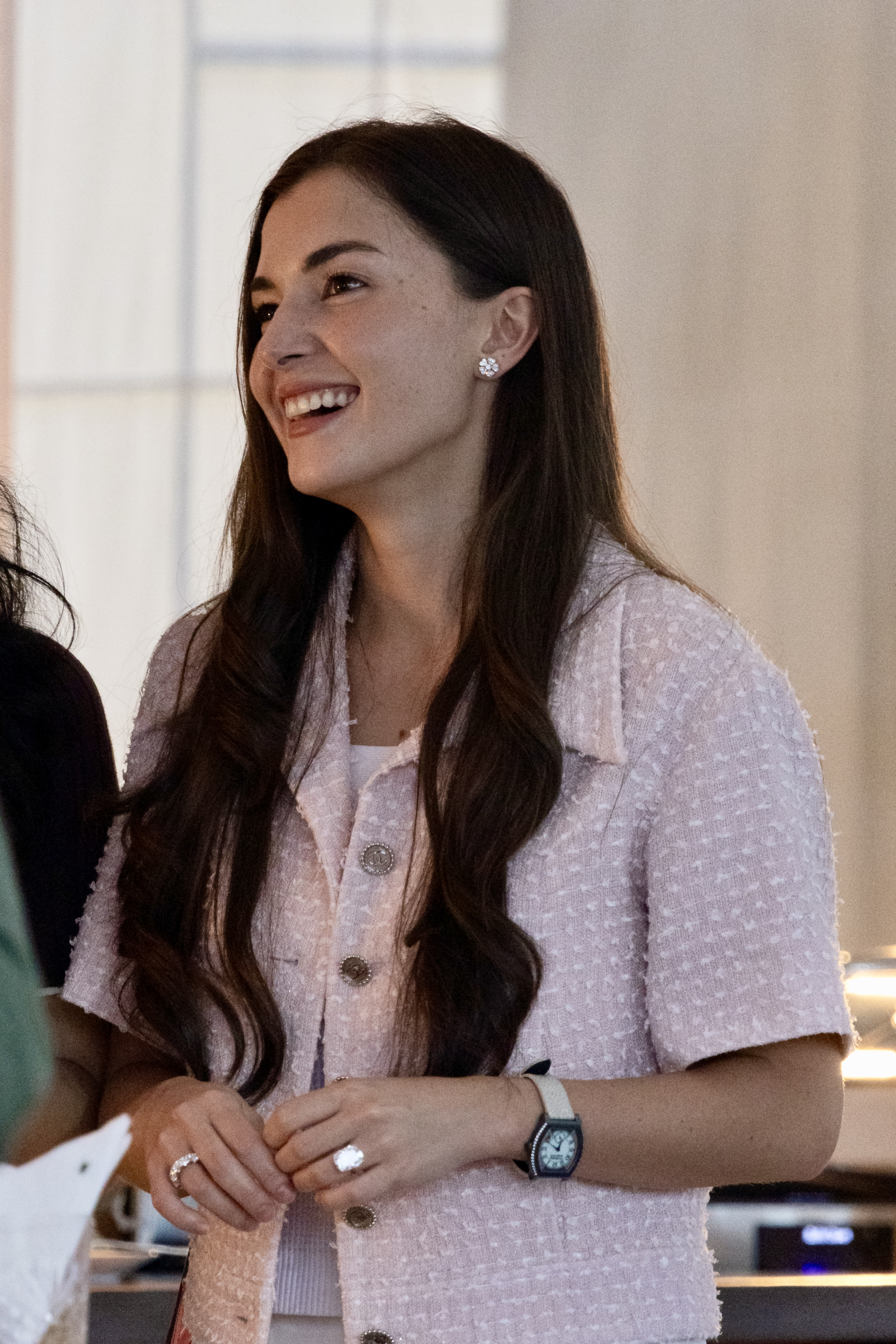
- Anisha in 2024
- Born: 6 November 1994 (age 31); London, United Kingdom
- Spouse: Prince Abdul Mateen (m. 2024)
- Issue: Princess Zahra Mariam Bolkiah
Names
- Anisha Isa-Kalebic
- House: Bolkiah (by marriage)
- Father: Ivica Adam Kalebic
- Mother: Siti Mariam Isa
- Religion: Sunni Islam
- Education: University of Bath (BA)

Anisha Rosnah binti Adam (Jawi: انيشا روسنه; born 6 November 1994) is a member of the royal family of Brunei as the wife of Prince Abdul Mateen, the fourth son of Sultan Hassanal Bolkiah. After the marriage, she was given the style of Yang Amat Mulia which corresponds to Her Highness and the title of Pengiran Anak Isteri which can be translated as Princess consort.

== Early life ==
Anisha was born on 6 November 1994 in London to Siti Mariam binti Isa and Ivica Adam Kalebic. Her father is from Croatia and is also known in Brunei as Adam bin Abdullah. Her mother is from a prominent Bruneian Malay political family. Anisha's great-grandfather, Ibrahim bin Mohammad Jahfar, was the first Prime Minister of Brunei and her grandfather, Isa bin Ibrahim, is the former Prime Minister of Brunei, Minister of Home Affairs, and Speaker of the Legislative Council of Brunei. Her parents divorced in 2009.

She has three full siblings: Danial Deen Isa-Kalebic, Marina Isa-Kalebic, and Idris Isa-Kalebic. Her brother Danial is good friends with her husband, Prince Mateen. Anisha also has four half-siblings from her father's other relationships: Alexander, Anna Maria, Jean Pierre, and Natasha.

== Education and career ==
Anisha completed her primary and secondary education at Jerudong International School in Kampong Tungku which was also attended by her siblings and future husband.

In 2017, she graduated from the University of Bath in the United Kingdom with a Bachelor of Arts in Modern Languages & European Studies. Additionally, she completed a semester abroad at Complutense University in Madrid and a work placement in Paris. Anisha is fluent in English, French, Malay, and Spanish.

In 2016, while still attending university, Anisha founded Authentinerary with fellow student, Emily Paul. It provides bespoke travel itineraries to Paris, Madrid, and Bath. In 2019, she opened fashion label, Silk Collective, with her future sister-in-law, Janetira Attaskulchai.

== Marriage and children ==
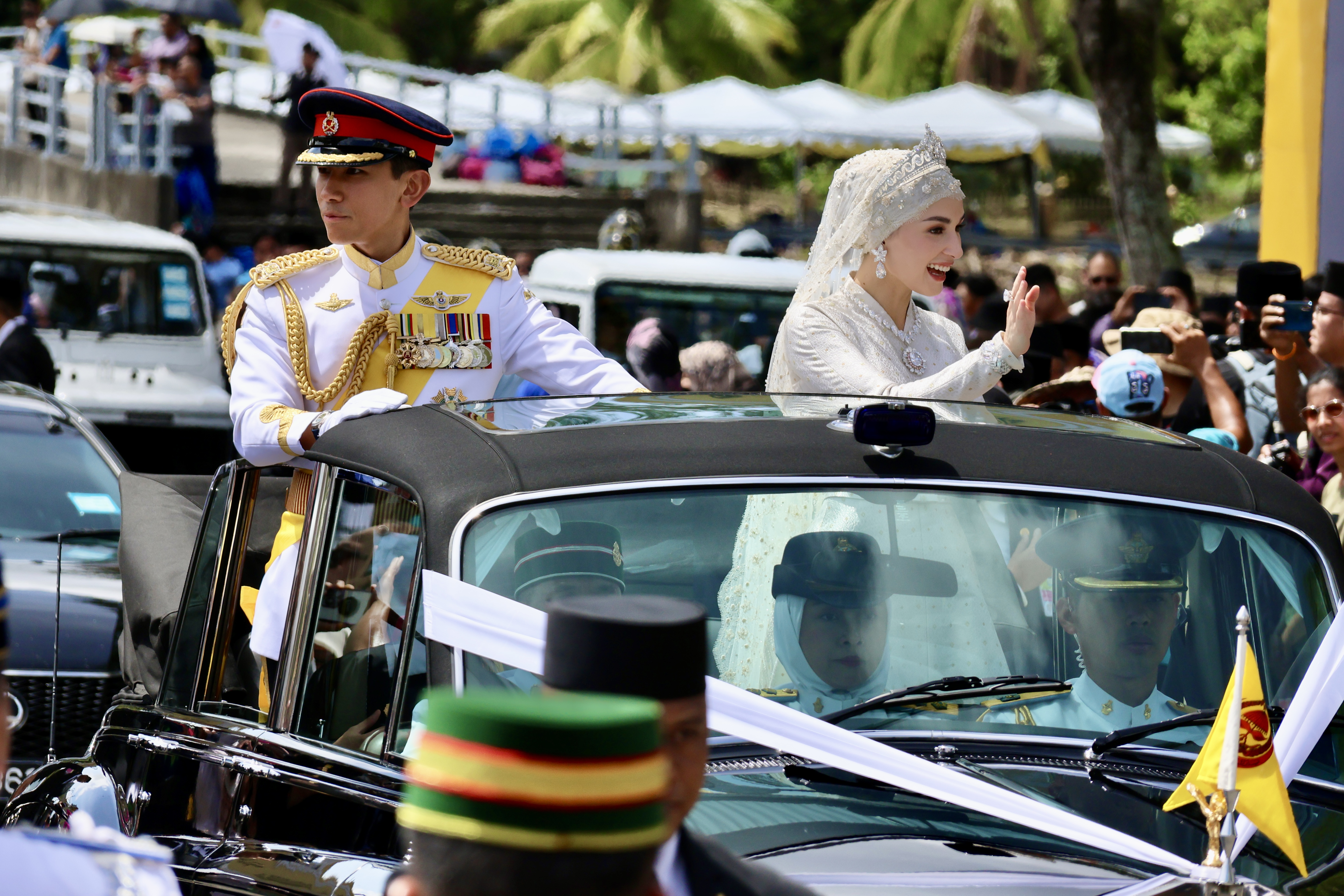
Mateen and Anisha during their wedding parade in 2024

On 8 October 2023, the royal court announced the engagement of Anisha and Prince Abdul Mateen of Brunei. The couple have known each other since they were children and are said to have begun dating in 2018. Anisha has attended several events over the years as Prince Mateen's partner such as his Green beret presentation in 2021, Princess Fadzilah's wedding in 2022, and Princess Azemah's wedding in 2023.

The couple married in an elaborate ten day celebration from 7 January to 16 January 2024. The Majlis Istiadat Berbedak Pengantin Diraja or powdering ceremony was held on 10 January. Anisha and Mateen wore traditional red outfits and their families applied scented powder and oils to their hands to bless them. The next day was the Majlis Istiadat Akad Nikah Diraja or solemnisation ceremony at Omar Ali Saifuddien Mosque where they were officially married. Anisha wore a dress by Teh Firdaus. The highpoint of the celebrations was the Majlis Bersanding Pengantin Diraja on the 14th which was followed by a procession through the streets of Bandar Seri Begawan. Anisha wore a gown by Dior and jewelry loaned from Queen Saleha of Brunei. The events ended with the Majlis Persantapan Diraja which was a banquet at Istana Nurul Iman with around 5,000 guests. Anisha wore a Zuhair Murad gown with jewelry again loaned from Queen Saleha.

Many foreign royals and politicians attended the wedding including President Joko Widodo, President Bongbong Marcos and Liza Araneta Marcos, Sultan Abdullah and Tunku Azizah, King Jigme Khesar Namgyel Wangchuck and Queen Jetsun Pema, Prime Minister Lee Hsien Loong and Ho Ching, Prime Minister Anwar Ibrahim and Wan Azizah, Princess Noor and Amr Zedan, Princess Munira Al-Saud and Prince Mamdouh, Sheikh Rashid, Tengku Muhammad Iskandar, Tunku Idris Iskandar, Tengku Fahd Mu'adzam, and Tunku Aminah Maimunah.

On 14 October 2025, the couple announced that they were expecting their first child. Anisha gave birth to their daughter, Zahra Mariam, on 8 February 2026. Her full name and title is Yang Amat Mulia Pengiran Anak Zahra Mariam Bolkiah Binti Duli Yang Teramat Mulia Paduka Seri Pengiran Muda 'Abdul Mateen. This is roughly translated to Her Highness Princess Zahra Mariam Bolkiah of Brunei.

== Royal duties ==
As a member of the royal family, Anisha participates in incoming state visits to Brunei, investiture ceremonies, and National Day celebrations. In July 2024, she traveled to Kuala Lumpur for the installation of Ibrahim Iskandar of Johor as the 17th King of Malaysia.

She also attends charitable and cultural events like the opening of Al-Ameerah Al-Hajjah Maryam School, Brunei's first special education school, and the 'Faith & Devotion' art exhibition.

== Titles and styles ==
Styles of Anisha Rosnah
- Reference style: Yang Amat Mulia
- Alternative style: Her Highness

Prior to her marriage, she used the informal version of her name, Anisha Isa Kalebic, which is the format still used by her siblings.

Brunei has a complex system of titles and the royal court does not use English translations of Anisha's title. After marriage, she was given the style of Yang Amat Mulia which corresponds to Her Highness and the title of Pengiran Anak Isteri which can be translated as Princess consort.

- 6 November 1994 – 11 January 2024: Yang Mulia Dayang Anisha Rosnah binti Adam
- 11 January 2024 – present: Yang Amat Mulia Pengiran Anak Isteri Anisha Rosnah binti Adam
