= Tunku-class littoral mission ship =

Corvette warship

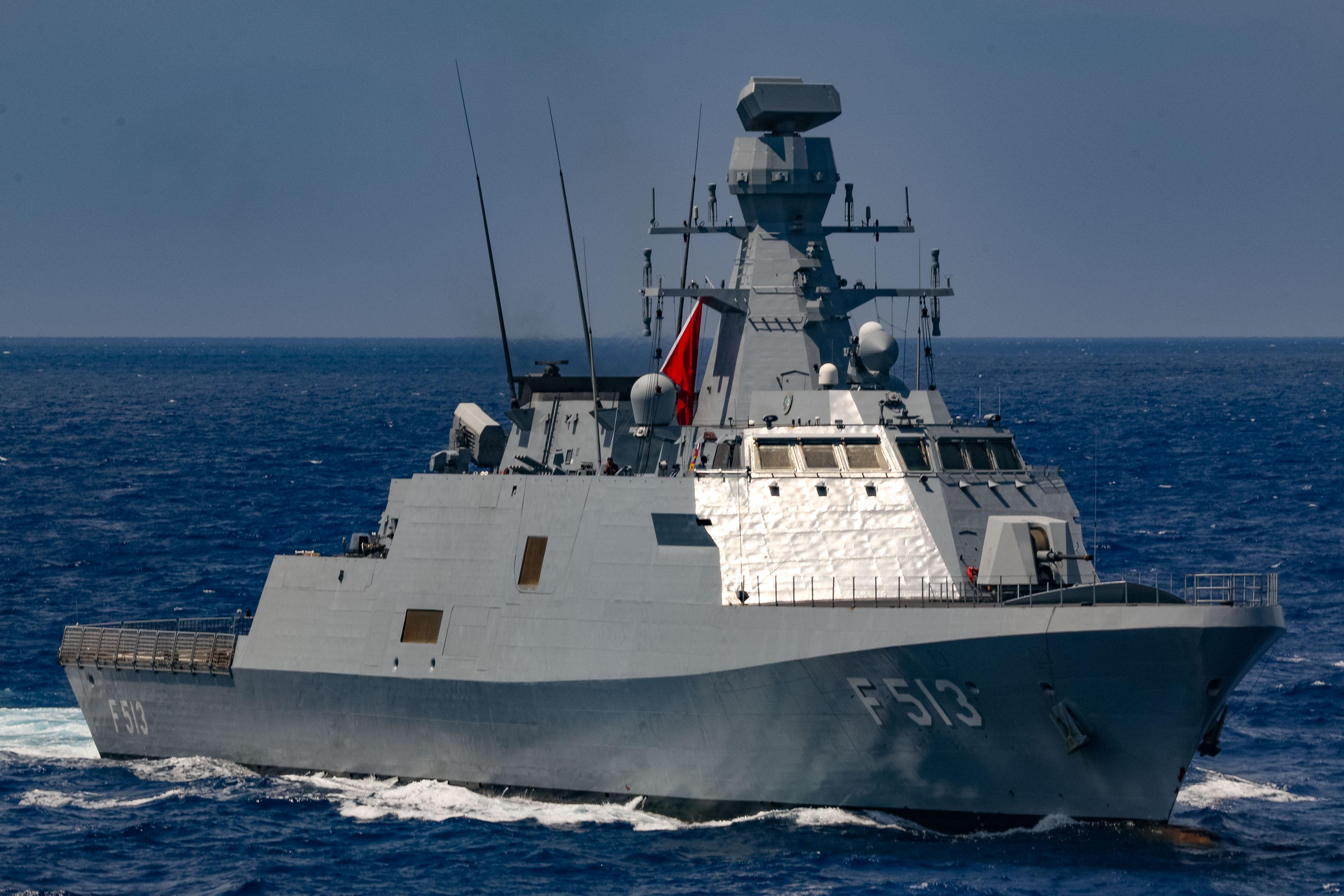
- Ada class of Turkish Navy which is the same design as the Littoral Mission Ship Batch 2

Class overview
- Name: Tunku class
- Builders: STM
- Operators: Royal Malaysian Navy
- Built: 2024–present
- Planned: 3

General characteristics
- Type: Corvette
- Displacement: 2,400 tonnes
- Length: 99.56 m (326 ft 8 in)
- Beam: 14.40 m (47 ft 3 in)
- Draft: 3.90 m (12 ft 10 in)
- Installed power: Main: 31,640 kW (42,430 hp) RENK CODAG; Auxiliary: 4 x 588 kW (789 hp)
- Propulsion: 1 gas turbine, 2 diesels, 2 shafts
- Speed: Economy: 15 kn (28 km/h; 17 mph); Maximum: 30 kn (56 km/h; 35 mph)
- Range: 3,500 nmi (6,500 km; 4,000 mi) at 15 kn (28 km/h; 17 mph)
- Endurance: 21 days with logistic support; 10 days autonomous
- Boats & landing craft carried: 2 x RHIB
- Complement: 93 including aviation officers, with accommodation up to 106
- Sensors & processing systems: Combat management system: Havelsan ADVENT G-MSYS (GENESIS MİLGEM Savaş Yönetim Sistemi); Search radar: Aselsan CENK 400-N AESA; Fire control radar: Aselsan AKREP-N; Weapon control: Thales STING EO Mk2; Communication: SatCom, GPS, LAN, ECDIS/WECDIS, Link 11/16; Navigation: ECPINS-W, ALPER LPI; Integrated platform management system: UniMACS 3000; Others: X-Band radar
- Electronic warfare & decoys: SIGINT: ARES-2N; Others: Laser/RF systems, ASW jammers, DG, SSTD
- Armament: Guns: 1 × 76 mm (3 in) OTO Melara Super Rapid; 1 × 30 mm (1.2 in) Aselsan SMASH 200/30 RCWS; Anti-air: 16 × K-SAAM in VLS; Anti-ship: 8 × Atmaca
- Aircraft carried: Hangar and platform for: Medium-lift helicopter; Unmanned aerial vehicle
- Aviation facilities: Capability of storing armaments, 20 tons of JP-5 aircraft fuel, aerial refueling (HIRF) and maintenance systems

The Tunku class is a future class of three corvettes being acquired by the Royal Malaysian Navy (RMN) to fulfill the 15 to 5 fleet modernization program. The Tunku class will be based on the Ada-class corvette in service with the Turkish Navy. The LMSB2 program is a continuation of the Littoral Mission Ship Batch 1 or LMSB1 program which saw the introduction of the Keris-class littoral mission ship into the RMN's inventory.

== Development ==
Under the 15 to 5 program, the RMN listed Littoral Mission Ship (LMS) as part of the ship type in fleet modernization. This LMS is a small ship of the corvette or offshore patrol vessel that is capable of performing three-dimensional warfare tasks through the weapons module selected to be equipped to the ship.

At the beginning of this procurement program, RMN has chosen the Keris-class ships made in China as the first batch. However, with the limited size and armament of this class of ships, RMN decided to acquire a different ship for the second batch. Among the companies that offer their products are HD Hyundai Heavy Industries with HDC 2000, Fincantieri with FCX, Damen Group with Sigma, Dearsan with C92 and STM with Ada.

In 2024, Malaysia chose the Ada-class corvette as a base design for its LMSB2.

== Ships of the class ==
Pennant number	Name	Builder	Laid down	Launched	Commissioned	Status
141	Tunku Laksamana Abdul Jalil	STM	4 December 2024	24 May 2026	2027	Fitting out
142	Raja Laut	STM	TBA	7 June 2026	2027	Fitting out
143	Tunku Osman Jewa	STM	TBA	9 August 2026	2027	Fitting out
