= Tunku Iskandar Abdul Jalil Abu Bakar Ibrahim =

Raja Muda of Johor

Tunku Iskandar تونكو إسكندر

Raja Muda of Johor
- Reign: 22 November 2018 - present
- Predecessor: Tunku Ismail
- Born: 14 October 2017 (age 9); Sultanah Aminah Hospital, Johor Bahru, Johor State Malaysia
Names
- Tunku Iskandar Abdul Jalil Abu Bakar Ibrahim ibni Tunku Ismail
Regnal name
- Tunku Iskandar ibni Tunku Ismail
- House: Temenggong
- Father: Tunku Ismail Idris
- Mother: Che' Puan Mahkota Khaleeda
- Religion: Sunni Islam

Tunku Iskandar ibni Tunku Ismail (Jawi: تونكو إسكندر ابن تونكو إسماعيل; né Tunku Iskandar Abdul Jalil Abu Bakar Ibrahim ibni Tunku Ismail, born 14 October 2017) is a member of the Johor royal family who is the Raja Muda of Johor. He is the first son and second child of the current Pemangku Sultan (Regent) and Tunku Mahkota (Crown Prince) of Johor, Tunku Ismail ibni Sultan Ibrahim and his consort, Che’ Puan Mahkota Khaleeda Johor. As his father is the heir apparent, upon his birth, Tunku Iskandar becomes second in line of succession to the throne of Johor.

He is the eldest grandson of the current Yang di-Pertuan Agong (King) of Malaysia and the Sultan of Johor, Sultan Ibrahim of Johor and the current Raja Permaisuri Agong (Queen) of Malaysia and also the Permaisuri of Johor, Raja Zarith Sofiah. Additionally, he is the great-grandson of the late Sultan Iskandar of Johor and the late Sultan Idris Shah II of Perak.

== Birth ==
Tunku Iskandar was born on 14 October 2017 at the Sultanah Aminah Hospital, in Johor Bahru. His birth was announced by the Johor Council of Royal Court president, Dato' Abdul Rahim Ramli who also announced the name given by his grandfather, Sultan Ibrahim ibni Almarhum Sultan Iskandar. His given name was a combination of the names of his late great-grandfather, Sultan Iskandar, his late uncle, Tunku Abdul Jalil, his late fourth great-grandfather, Sultan Abu Bakar and his late third great-grandfather, Sultan Ibrahim.

He is the second child of Tunku Ismail ibni Sultan Ibrahim and his wife, Che’ Puan Mahkota Khaleeda. His elder sister, Tunku Khalsom Aminah Sofiah was born on 25 June 2016. His younger brother, Tunku Abu Bakar Ibrahim was born on 17 July 2019. His younger sister, Tunku Zahrah Zarith Aziyah was born on 21 April 2021.

== Raja Muda of Johor ==
He was proclaimed as the Raja Muda of Johor by his grandfather, Sultan Ibrahim ibni Almarhum Sultan Iskandar on 22 November 2018. He is the third Raja Muda of modern Johor. Almarhum Sultan Iskandar was the first titleholder in the House of Temenggong and the second was his own father, Tunku Ismail.

In contrast to the Raja Muda of the states of Kedah, Perak, Perlis & Selangor, who are the heir apparents to their respective monarchies, the title of Raja Muda of Johor is bestowed upon to the eldest son of the heir apparent of the Sultan of Johor. This tradition started when Almarhum Sultan Iskandar proclaimed his grandson, Tunku Ismail, as the Raja Muda of Johor in 2005.

== Titles and styles ==
Styles of Tunku Iskandar
- Reference style: His Royal Highness
- Spoken style: Your Royal Highness
- Alternative style: Raja Muda

- Since 22 November 2018: His Royal Highness Tunku Iskandar ibni Tunku Ismail, Raja Muda of Johor

== Honours ==
- First Class of the Royal Family Order of Johor (DK I) (20 May 2026)
- Knight Commander of the Order of the Crown of Johor (DPMJ) – Dato' (2024)
- First Class of the Sultan Ibrahim Medal (PIS I) (2024)

Tunku Iskandar Abdul Jalil Abu Bakar Ibrahim House of Temenggong, Johor Born: 14 October 2017
Malaysian royalty
Lines of succession
Preceded by Tunku Ismail Idris, Tunku Mahkota of Johor	Line of succession to the throne of Johor; 2nd in line	Followed by Tunku Abu Bakar Ibrahim
