= Tunku Idris Iskandar =

Malaysian prince

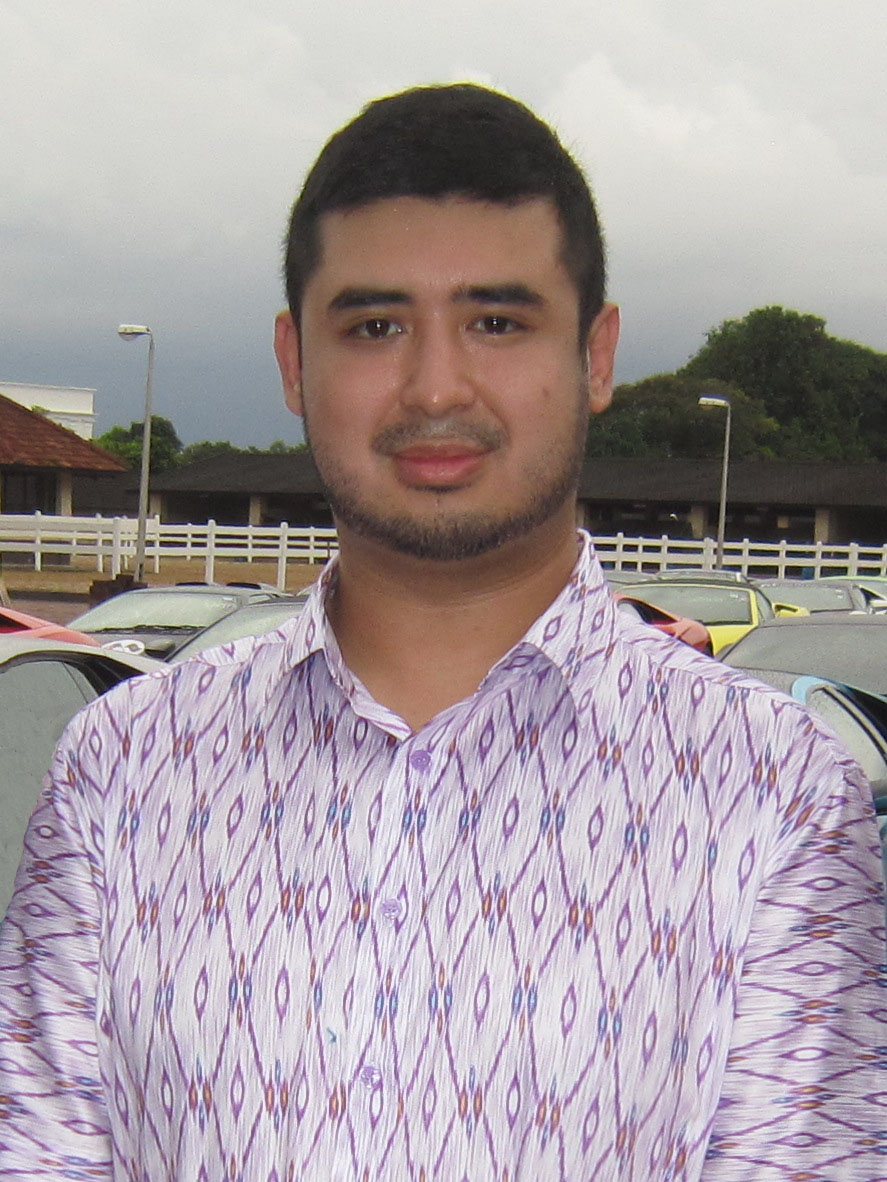
- Tunku Idris in 2014

Tunku Temenggong of Johor (Prince Temenggong of Johor)
- Tenure: 22 February 2010 - present
- Proclamation: 26 February 2010
- Born: 25 December 1987 (age 38); Johor Bahru, Johor, Malaysia
Names
- Tunku Idris Iskandar Ismail Abdul Rahman ibni Tunku Ibrahim Ismail
Regnal name
- Tunku Idris Iskandar Al-Haj ibni Sultan Ibrahim
- House: Temenggong
- Father: Sultan Ibrahim
- Mother: Raja Zarith Sofiah
- Religion: Sunni Islam
- Military career
- Allegiance: Malaysia
- Branch: Royal Malaysian Navy; Malaysian Army
- Service years: 2021–present 2006–2021
- Rank: Commander (TDM); Lieutenant Colonel (TLDM)

Tunku Idris Iskandar Al-Haj ibni Sultan Ibrahim (né Tunku Idris Iskandar Ismail Abdul Rahman ibni Tunku Ibrahim Ismail, born 25 December 1987) is a member of the Johor royal family who is the Tunku Temenggong of Johor. Currently, he is fourth in the line of succession to the throne of Johor after his elder brother, the Crown Prince Tunku Ismail Idris and nephews, Tunku Iskandar Abdul Jalil Abu Bakar Ibrahim and Tunku Abu Bakar Ibrahim.

He is the third child and second son of the current Sultan of Johor, Sultan Ibrahim and the Permaisuri of Johor, Raja Zarith Sofiah. His parents are also the current Yang di-Pertuan Agong (King) and the Raja Permaisuri Agong (Queen) of Malaysia.

== Biography ==
On 26 February 2010, Tunku Idris Iskandar was named Tunku Temenggong of Johor at the age of 22. While officiating the state-wide Maulidur Rasul celebrations at the Sultan Abu Bakar Mosque, his father the sultan made the appointment official.

On 29 September 2012, Johor Menteri Besar Abdul Ghani Othman made the announcement that Tunku Idris had been named as the state's regent while the Sultan and Crown Prince were not present. At the declaration ceremony held at Istana Pasir Pelangi in Johor Bahru, the Menteri Besar recited the proclamation. On the other hand, he would be named as the Regent of Johor when the Crown Prince, who was absent at the moment, returned to the state on 19 October. During the same ceremony, a statement was also delivered regarding this issue.

== Career ==
=== Military career ===
Tunku Idris attended a flight course at the Integration Aviation Academy (IAC) in Perak and served as an Army Pilot in the 881 Army Air Force Regiment, Mahkota Camp, Kluang, Johor. Tunku Idris joined the service of the Malaysian Army (TDM) through the 70th Short Term Commissioning on 16 February 2006. On 28 June 2021, he joined the service of the Royal Malaysian Navy (TLDM) and took up a position as a Helicopter Pilot of Squadron 501 at KD Rajawali, Lumut TLDM base. According to a statement on TLDM's social media, Sultan Abdullah accepted Tunku Idris' transfer of service from the TDM to TLDM, which took effect on 25 May.

=== Political career ===
Tunku Idris recently sparked a firestorm online by suggesting he would run in the following general election. He posted an Instagram Story with the hashtag "PRU15" and a poll asking whether he should run for the Muar or Mersing parliamentary seat, according to a report by Sin Chew Daily.

=== Other positions ===
On 7 February 2015, Tunku Idris organised a charity drive to aid in the rehabilitation of flood victims. He attracted more than 60 supercar owners from Singapore. When the prince witnessed the destruction caused by the floods in Kelantan, Pahang, and Perak, he claimed he felt compelled to do his part to aid the victims.

== Honours ==
Styles of Tunku Idris
- Reference style: His Highness
- Spoken style: Your Highness
- Alternative style: Tunku

=== Johor ===
- First Class of the Royal Family Order of Johor (DK I) (22 November 2012)
- Knight Grand Commander of the Order of the Crown of Johor (SPMJ) – Dato' (8 April 2008)
- Grand Knight of the Order of Sultan Ibrahim Johor (SMIJ) – Dato' (30 March 2015)
- First Class of the Sultan Ibrahim Medal (PIS I)
- First Class of the Sultan Ibrahim Coronation Medal (23 March 2015)
- First Class of the Sultan Ibrahim of Johor Medal (PSI I) (23 March 2017)
- Sultan Iskandar Coronation Medal

=== National ===
- Malaysia
  - Recipient of the General Service Medal (PPA)
  - Recipient of the 16th Yang di-Pertuan Agong Installation Medal (30 July 2019)
  - Recipient of the 17th Yang di-Pertuan Agong Installation Medal (20 July 2024)
- Kedah
  - Recipient of the Sultan Sallehuddin Installation Medal (22 October 2018)
- Perlis
  - Recipient of Tuanku Syed Sirajuddin Jamalullail Silver Jubilee Medal (17 April 2025)
- Perak
  - Recipient of the Sultan Azlan Shah Silver Jubilee Medal (3 February 2009)
  - Recipient of the Sultan Nazrin Shah Installation Medal (6 May 2015)

=== Foreign ===
- Brunei
  - Sultan of Brunei Golden Jubilee Medal (5 October 2017)

== Ancestry ==
Ancestors of Tunku Idris Iskandar

16. Sultan Ibrahim bin Abu Bakar of Johor
8. Sultan Ismail bin Ibrahim of Johor
17. Ungku Maimuna binti Ungku Abdul Majid
4. Sultan Iskandar bin Ismail of Johor
18. Ungku Ahmad bin Ungku Muhammad Khalid
9. Ungku Tun Amina binti Ungku Ahmad
19. Ungku Khadija binti Ungku Muhammad
2. Sultan Ibrahim Ismail of Johor
20. Henry David Trevorrow
10. Reginald George Trevorrow
21. Florence Louisa Capling
5. Enche' Besar Hajjah Kalsum binti Abdullah (née Josephine Ruby Trevorrow)
22. Thomas Alderman
11. Ruby May Alderman
1. Tunku Idris Iskandar
24. Sultan Idris Shah I of Perak
12. Sultan Iskandar bin Idris of Perak
25. Cik Ngah Manah binti Manda Duwayat
6. Sultan Idris Shah II of Perak
26. Raja Kulop Muhammad Kramat bin Raja Alang Iskandar
13. Raja Puteh Umi Kalsum binti Raja Kulop Muhammad Kramat
27. Che Ken Uda Sari binti Abdul Rahman
3. Raja Zarith Sofiah binti Idris
28. Raja Haji Harun al-Rashid bin Idris Murshid
14. Raja Arif Shah bin Raja Haji Harun al-Rashid
29. Cik Haji Ngah Uteh Mariah binti Haji Sulaiman
7. Raja Muzwin binti Raja Arif Shah
30. Abdullah
15. Cik Puan Aziza binti Abdullah

Tunku Idris Iskandar Tunku Temenggong of Johor Born: 25 December 1987
Royal titles
Preceded by Tunku Ahmad ibni al-Marhum Sultan Sir Ibrahim	Tunku Temenggong of Johor; 2010 – present
