= Tunku Tun Aminah Maimunah Iskandariah =

Malaysian princess (born 1986)

Tunku Tun Aminah
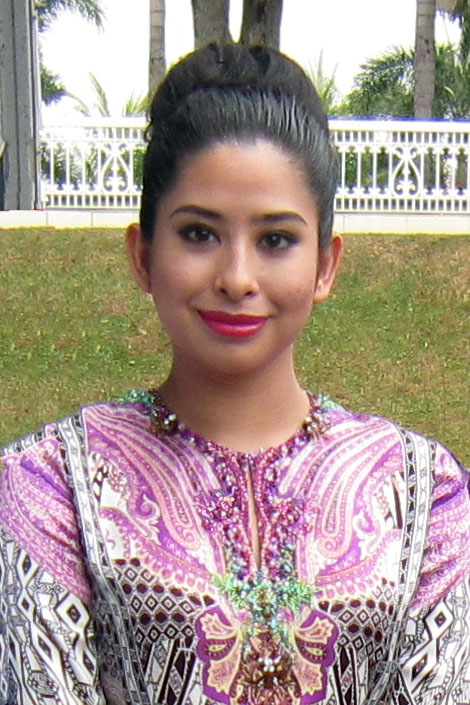
- Born: Tunku Aminah Maimunah Iskandariah binti Tunku Ibrahim Ismail; 8 April 1986 (age 40); Johor Bahru, Johor
- Spouse: Dennis Muhammad Abdullah (m. 2017)
- Issue: Layla Sofiah - Verbaas; Danial - Verbaas
Names
- Tunku Aminah Maimunah Iskandariah binti Tunku Ibrahim Ismail
Regnal name
- Tunku Tun Aminah binti Sultan Ibrahim
- House: Temenggong
- Father: Sultan Ibrahim
- Mother: Raja Zarith Sofiah

Tunku Tun Aminah binti Sultan Ibrahim (born Tunku Aminah Maimunah Iskandariah binti Tunku Ibrahim Ismail, born 8 April 1986) is a member of the Johor royal family as the second child and only daughter of the current Sultan of Johor, Sultan Ibrahim ibni Almarhum Sultan Iskandar and the Permaisuri of Johor, Raja Zarith Sofiah binti Almarhum Sultan Idris Shah.

Her parents are also the current Yang di-Pertuan Agong (King) and the Raja Permaisuri Agong (Queen) of Malaysia.

== Personal life ==
On her paternal side, she is the granddaughter of the late Sultan Iskandar ibni Almarhum Sultan Ismail, the fourth Sultan of modern Johor and the late Enche' Besar Hajah Khalsom binti Abdullah. On her maternal side, she is the granddaughter of the late Sultan Idris Al-Mutawakil Alallahi Shah of Perak and the late Raja Perempuan Muzwin binti Raja Ariff Shah.

She has six siblings and is affectionately known as "Tunku Inah".

== Education ==
Tunku Tun Aminah received her early education at Hiltop Kindergarten, Johor Bahru Sri Utama School and Johor Bahru Convent School. The following year, she continued her A-Level studies at the LASALLE College of the Arts in Singapore and at the Australian International School Singapore, where she successfully obtained the Higher School Certificate. In addition, she also started riding horses from the age of 11 and inherited her mother's talent in drawing.

== Business involvements ==
Tunku Tun Aminah has released a range of skincare sets called "Luvins The Royal Art of Beauty" which are specially made for every woman regardless of age. "Luvins" comes from the word "Luv Ina". This product was initiated by herself and as a sign of love and affection to the users of the product. This product has also been manufactured at Mum Bio-Cos Manufacturing in Johor Bahru.

She has also served as the director and designer for Luvins and received a lot of encouragement from both her parents. She stated that she is very interested in the beauty business apart from being a fashion designer. These products are also marketed in spas and salons in addition to department stores. Luvins hair salon and spa was designed to be built in Johor Bahru. In addition, she also wants to diversify this product into makeup, fragrance and shampoo.

She was appointed as a member of the Board of Directors of REDtone Company on 3 March 2017 and is the main shareholder of the company. She has extensive experience in leading private organizations across various industries. Currently, she is the Chairman of Berjaya Waterfront Sdn Bhd and Berjaya Assets Berhad. She also holds the KFC franchise in Stulang Laut, Johor Bahru and is also the president of Johor Darul Ta'zim Football Club (better known as JDT). She was also appointed as the chairman of U Mobile on 13 March 2026.

== Marriage and children ==
Tunku Tun Aminah married Dutch national Dennis Verbaas, who later converted to Islam and adopted the name of Dennis Muhammad Abdullah, at Istana Besar, Johor Bahru on 14 August 2017.

The royal couple has two children. Their first child and eldest daughter was born on 21 January 2020. In 2022, the couple welcomed their second child and first son.

== Styles and honours ==
Styles of Tunku Tun Aminah
- Reference style: Her Highness
- Spoken style: Your Highness
- Alternative style: Tunku

She has been awarded:

- Johor
  - First Class of the Royal Family Order of Johor (DK I) (22 November 2012)
  - Knight Grand Commander of the Order of the Crown of Johor (SPMJ) – Datin Paduka (15 March 2015)
  - Grand Knight of the Most Exalted Order of Sultan Ibrahim of Johor (SMIJ) – Datin Paduka (30 March 2015)
  - Knight Commander of the Order of the Crown of Johor (DPMJ) – Datin Paduka (11 April 2009)
  - First Class of the Sultan Ibrahim Medal (PIS I)
  - First Class of the Sultan Ibrahim of Johor Medal (PSI I) (23 March 2017)
  - First Class of the Sultan Ibrahim Coronation Medal (23 March 2015)
- Malaysia
  - Recipient of the 16th Yang di-Pertuan Agong Installation Medal (30 July 2019)
  - Recipient of the 17th Yang di-Pertuan Agong Installation Medal (20 July 2024)

Her husband Dato' Dennis Muhammad Abdullah, has been awarded:

- Johor
  - Knight Grand Commander of the Order of the Crown of Johor (SPMJ) – Dato' (23 March 2024)
  - Knight Commander of the Order of the Crown of Johor (DPMJ) – Dato' (23 March 2019)
- Malaysia
  - Recipient of the 16th Yang di-Pertuan Agong Installation Medal (30 July 2019)
  - Recipient of the 17th Yang di-Pertuan Agong Installation Medal (20 July 2024)
