= Sri Utama School =

International schools in Malaysia

Information
- Established: 1994; 31 years ago
- Website: www.utama.edu.my

Sri Utama Schools are branches of international schools in Malaysia. The school was established on 1 September 1994. As of 2006, the Malaysian Government has allowed students from Malaysia to be educated there, thus gaining statuses as both an International and National school. Sri Utama offers students a place in Kindergarten, Primary and Secondary levels. The school's academia includes UPSR, PMR, SPM as well as a number of International examination papers such as IGCSE.

There are three campuses in Malaysia. All of them are situated in Kuala Lumpur, Johor Bahru and Terengganu respectively.

Sri Utama provides students with a variety of facilities to aid in student development. A number of those facilities include the library, a 25-meter pool, a canteen, air-conditioned classrooms complete with lockers to secure students' belongings, a soccer field, a basketball court, well equipped hostels, computer labs and three open-air patios. There are also a number of annual events such as swimming competitions, annual Sports' Day, Alumni Night and an end-year concert. To complement and strengthen the students' academic learning, Sri Utama offers a wide range of co-curricular activities including sports and games, academic and non-academic societies, and the Uniformed Units.
