= Order of Sultan Ibrahim of Johor =

Knighthood order of the Sultanate of Johor

The Most Exalted Order of Sultan Ibrahim of Johor Darjah Mulia Sultan Ibrahim Johor

Awarded by the Sultan of Johor
- Type: Order
- Status: Currently constituted
- Sovereign: Ibrahim Ismail of Johor
- Grades: Grand Commander; Commander; Companion
- Post-nominals: S.M.I.J.; D.M.I.J.; S.I.J.

Statistics
- First induction: 2015
- Last induction: 2026

Precedence
- Next (higher): Order of Loyalty of Sultan Ismail of Johor
- Ribbon bar of the order

The Most Exalted Order of the Sultan Ibrahim Johor (Malay: Darjah Sultan Ibrahim Johor Yang Amat Disanjungi) is a knighthood order of the Sultanate of Johor.

== History ==
The Order was founded by Sultan Ibrahim Sultan Iskandar in conjunction with his coronation on 30 March 2015.

== Classes ==
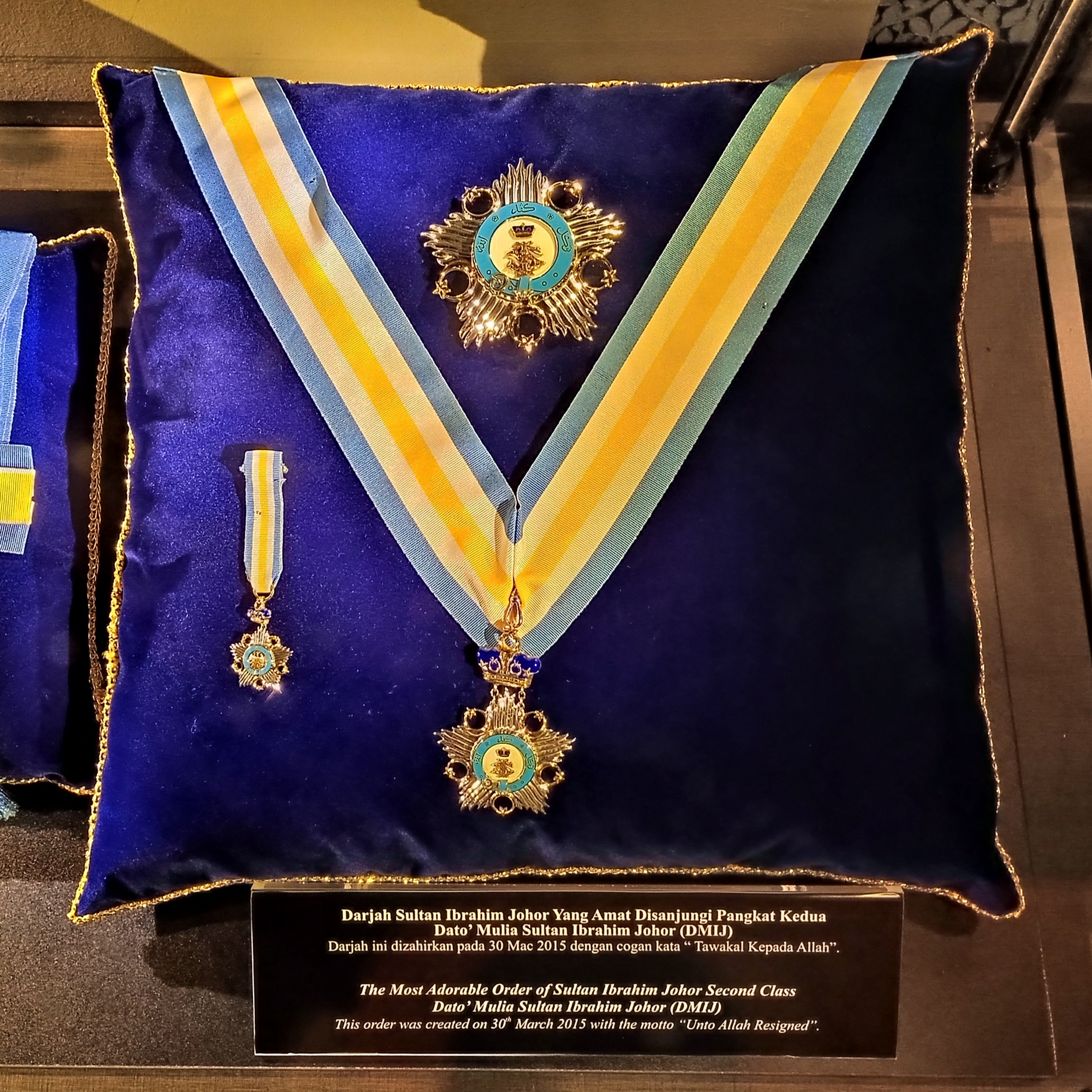
Commander of the Order of Sultan Ibrahim of Johor

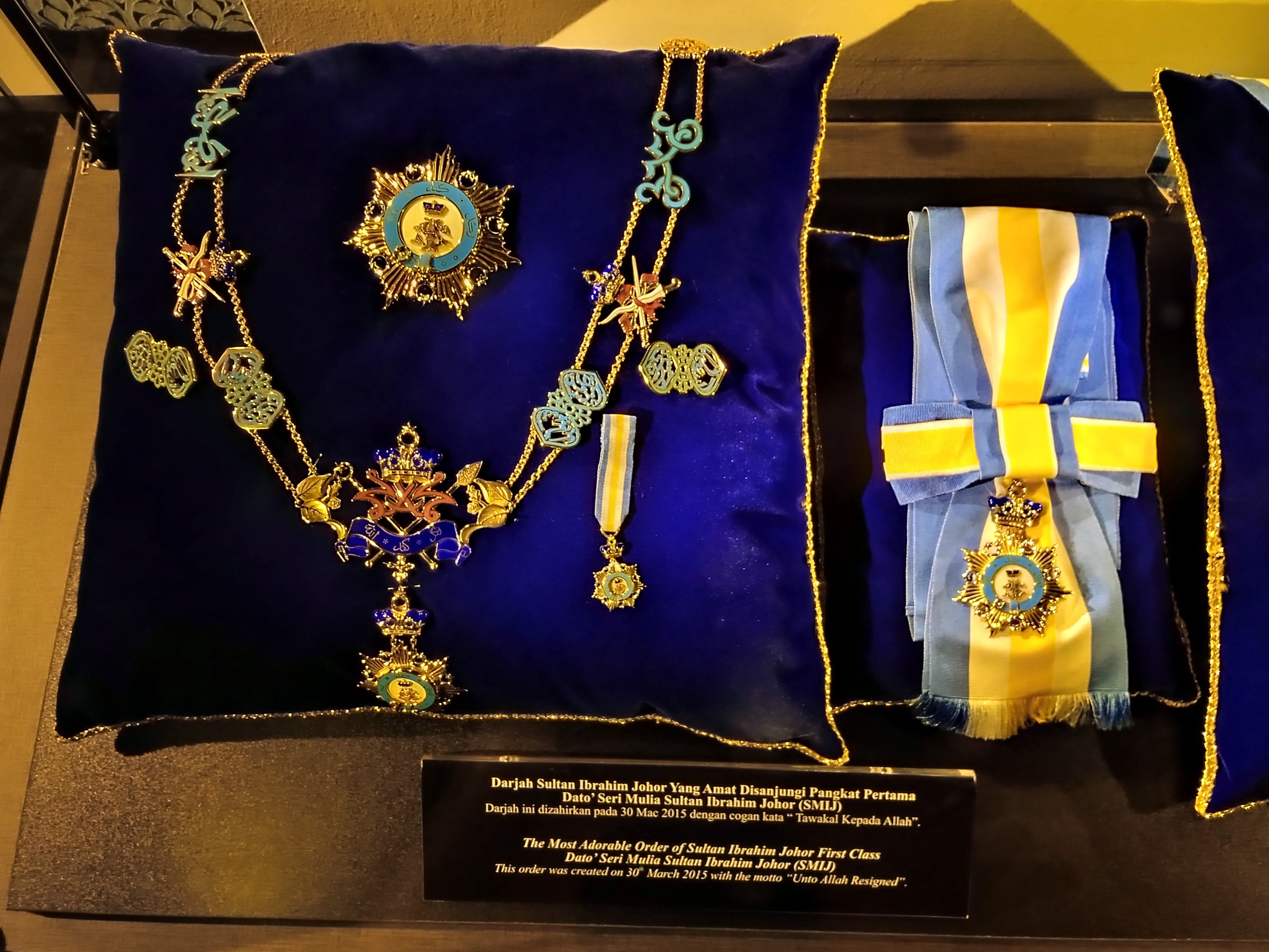
Grand Commander of the Order of Sultan Ibrahim of Johor

The Order is awarded in three classes:

- Grand Commander (Dato' Sri Mulia, post-nominal letters : SMIJ)
- Commander (Dato' Mulia, post-nominal letters : DMIJ)
- Companion (Setia Mulia, post-nominal letters : SIJ)

== Recipients ==
=== Grand Commander (S.M.I.J.) ===
- Tunku Ismail Idris (2015)
- Tunku Tun Aminah Maimunah Iskandariah (2015)
- Tunku Idris Iskandar (2015)
- Tunku Abdul Jalil Iskandar (2015)
- Tunku Abdul Rahman Hassanal Jeffri (2015)
- Tunku Abu Bakar (2015)
- Enche' Besar Hajah Khalsom binti Abdullah (2015)
- Mohamed Khaled Nordin (2015)
- Abdul Rahim Ramli (2015)
- Raja Zarith Sofiah (2017)
- Daing Malik Daing Rahaman (2017)
- Onn Hafiz Ghazi (2023)
- Che' Puan Mahkota Khaleeda Johor (2026)

== Foreign Recipients ==
=== Grand Commandert (S.M.I.J.) ===
- Rodrigo Duterte (2019)
- Apirat Kongsompong (2020)
- Ho Ching (2022)
- Sultan Hassanal Bolkiah (2023)

== See also ==
- Orders, decorations, and medals of the Malaysian states and federal territories#Johor
- Order of precedence in Johor
- List of post-nominal letters (Johor)
