= Tunku Ismail Idris =

Heir apparent to the Johor throne (born 1984)

Tunku Ismail تونكو إسماعيل
- Pemangku Sultan of Johor; Tunku Mahkota of Johor
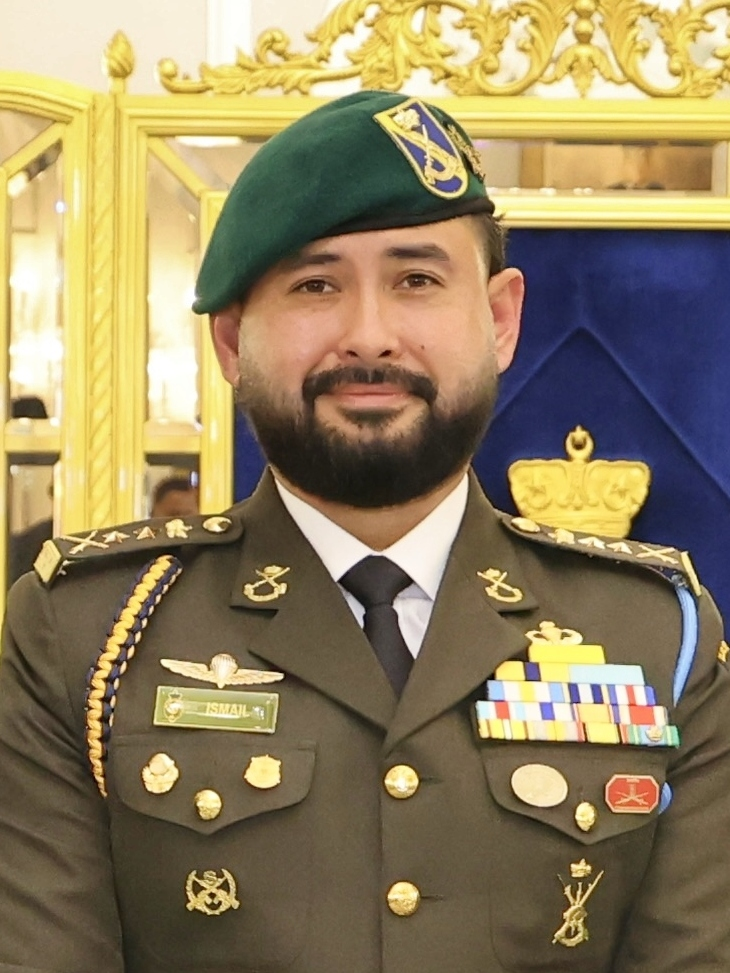
- Ismail in 2024

Pemangku Sultan of Johor (Regent of Johor)
- Tenure: 28 January 2024 – present
- Proclamation: 28 January 2024
- Predecessor: Tunku Ibrahim Ismail
- Menteri Besar: Onn Hafiz Ghazi

Tunku Mahkota of Johor (Crown Prince of Johor)
- Tenure: 28 January 2010 – present
- Proclamation: 28 January 2010
- Predecessor: Tunku Ibrahim Ismail
- Raja Muda: Tunku Iskandar
- Born: Tunku Ismail Idris Abdul Majid Abu Bakar Iskandar ibni Tunku Ibrahim Ismail; 30 June 1984 (age 42); Johor Bahru, Johor, Malaysia
- Spouse: Che' Puan Mahkota Khaleeda (m. 2014)
- Issue: Tunku Khalsom Aminah Sofiah; Tunku Iskandar Abdul Jalil Abu Bakar Ibrahim; Tunku Abu Bakar Ibrahim; Tunku Zahrah Zarith Aziyah; Tunku Khadeeja Khayra Iskandariah
Regnal name
- Tunku Ismail ibni Sultan Ibrahim
- House: Temenggong
- Father: Ibrahim Iskandar of Johor
- Mother: Raja Zarith Sofiah
- Religion: Sunni Islam
- Military career
- Allegiance: Sultan of Johor
- Branch: Royal Johor Military Force; Indian Army
- Service years: 2003–present (active service)
- Rank: Major General (JMF) Captain (Indian Army)
- Nickname: TMJ
- Units: 61 Cavalry, Jaipur; Johor Military Forces
- Awards: Best in riding (2003–2004)

Tunku Ismail ibni Sultan Ibrahim (Jawi: تونكو إسماعيل ابن سلطان إبراهيم; né Tunku Ismail Idris Abdul Majid Abu Bakar Iskandar ibni Tunku Ibrahim Ismail, born 30 June 1984) is the heir apparent to the Johor throne. He is the Regent (Pemangku Sultan) and Crown Prince (Tunku Mahkota) of Johor, and the eldest son of Sultan Ibrahim Iskandar and Raja Zarith Sofiah. He was proclaimed Regent of Johor on 28 January 2024, days before his father acceded as the 17th Yang di-Pertuan Agong of Malaysia.

Tunku Ismail trained at the Indian Military Academy and was commissioned into the Indian Army. In 2007 he led a mounted column of the 61 Cavalry regiment at India's Republic Day parade, the first foreigner to command an Indian Army unit on the occasion. He has been noted for his religious moderation. He owns the football club Johor Darul Ta'zim F.C., which in 2015 became the first Southeast Asian club to win the AFC Cup, and he was president of the Football Association of Malaysia (FAM) from 2017 to 2018.

Tunku Ismail has been the subject of several controversies. He was accused of assault after a 2008 confrontation with members of the Negeri Sembilan royal family at a Kuala Lumpur hotel and after a 2014 incident in the players' tunnel at a Piala FA match; neither case led to charges. In 2024, a member of his security escort assaulted a deaf Grab driver in Kuala Lumpur and was fined RM1,000. He has had a long-running public dispute with Muar MP Syed Saddiq, whom he has repeatedly called a populist. In 2025, FIFA sanctioned FAM over falsified documents used to naturalise seven players whom Tunku Ismail had approved, and he rejected the ruling.

== Early life and education ==
Tunku Ismail completed his early education at Sekolah Sri Utama and Sekolah Rendah Kebangsaan St. Joseph in Johor Bahru. He subsequently received lower secondary education at the Australian International School in Singapore and continued with his higher secondary studies at Hale School in Perth, Western Australia, until 2002. Tunku Ismail is the eldest among six siblings. Like his father, Tunku Ismail has no tertiary (academic) qualification.

Following a family tradition of getting trained in armed forces, with his late grandfather in the Malaysian Army and father in the US Army, Tunku Ismail aspired for a career in the Indian Armed Forces. In July 2003, he enrolled as a cadet officer in the Indian Military Academy (IMA), India's premier military training school located at Dehradun. He was commissioned as a lieutenant in December 2004 and absorbed into the Indian Army. He was promoted to the rank of captain in December 2007. His father and grandfather also had trained at IMA.

== Prince of Johor ==
Tunku Ismail was appointed Raja Muda (literally means "Younger King", but taken to mean as second heir apparent or son of the Crown Prince) on 8 April 2006 by his grandfather, the late Sultan of Johor, and placing him second in line to the throne (Now first in line after the passing of Sultan Iskandar). Tunku Ismail was appointed as the Tunku Mahkota of Johor on 28 January 2010.

The Malaysian prince is the first foreigner to lead a unit of the Indian Army in the Indian Republic Day Parade. On 26 January 2007, with a rank of captain in Indian Army, he led a mounted column of Jaipur-based 61 Cavalry regiment to salute president of India A. P. J. Abdul Kalam during the Republic Day celebrations. The president himself chose Tunku Ismail to lead the unit of around 400 men of the world's only non-ceremonial horse-mounted cavalry. The parade was witnessed by chief guest of the day president of Russia Vladimir Putin and his entourage, along with other dignitaries of Indian politics and military amidst tight security. Tunku Ismail's father Tunku Ibrahim Ismail flew in from Johor Bahru on 23 January 2007 to be present at the celebrations while his son added a chapter to the history of the Indian Army.

He is noted for his religious moderation and veiled criticism of more conservative Muslims who denounced him for shaking hands with women in 2016.

On 2 December 2022, Tunku Ismail was installed as the Chancellor of Universiti Tun Hussein Onn Malaysia (UTHM) at the first session of the university’s 22nd convocation at Dewan Sultan Ibrahim.

On 13 December 2023, Tunku Ismail was proclaimed as the Pro Chancellor of Kolej Universiti Islam Johor Sultan Ibrahim (KUIJSI) at the university's 21st convocation at the Johor Persada International Convention Centre.

== Other activities ==
=== Sports ===
A polo enthusiast, Tunku Ismail is a skilful horse rider. He was bestowed the Best in Riding award among IMA cadets between 2003 and 2004. He is also a polo player for his regiment and has won many trophies. In football, he is the owner of Johor Darul Ta'zim F.C..

The prince is also a sports car enthusiast. All of his cars are registered under the same licence plate of "TMJ", an abbreviation from the title Tunku Mahkota Johor which is also his nickname as addressed informally by Malaysians within and outside Johor.

His Royal Highness the Tunku Mahkota (Crown Prince) of Johor, Tunku Ismail ibni Sultan Ibrahim has been appointed as the President of Johor Football Association (PBNJ). The EGM held in Johor Bahru saw the Crown Prince appointed as the new president replacing the former, Jais Sarday. Among his plans to help bring back Johorean football to its former glory, the Crown Prince merged the Johor teams (which previously were Johor FC, MBJB and MP Muar) into only one where all of the players wear the Jengking (Scorpion) Team Jersey. .

Tunku Ismail's leadership on the club Johor Darul Ta'zim F.C also oversaw its success as the first Southeast Asian club to lift the AFC Cup in 2015.

In 2014, the Football Association of Malaysia (FAM) appointed the Tunku Ismail Sultan Ibrahim as an advisor to the previous FAM president, his uncle, Sultan Abdullah of Pahang. Tunku Ismail assisted and worked hand in hand with FAM in improving the quality of football within the country, particularly with the national team as well as the junior teams.

As predicted, there were several concerns about the news, particularly with Tunku Ismail having lost the FAM presidency election to Tengku Abdullah earlier that year. Besides that, he had been extremely vocal with his criticisms on the nation's footballing body. However, the then Johor FA president was extremely optimistic about the new role, claiming that he will only be pushing for the betterment of football within the country.

He was elected as President of FAM for a short term from 2017 to 2018.

== Controversies ==
=== Crowne Plaza incident ===
In the early hours of 24 October 2008, a confrontation occurred between members of the Johor and Negeri Sembilan royal families at a nightclub in Kuala Lumpur. The incident began when a bottle was allegedly thrown by a member of the Johor royalty at Tunku Nadzimuddin Tunku Muzaffar, a 36-year-old prince from the Negeri Sembilan royal family, and his friends. The Johor group left shortly after, while Tunku Nadzimuddin's group continued their night out.

Around 3 AM, Tunku Nadzimuddin received a call from someone claiming to be a member of the Johor royal family. The caller said that Tunku Ismail wanted to apologize for the earlier incident and invited Tunku Nadzimuddin to the Crowne Plaza hotel in Jalan Sultan Ismail. Out of respect, Tunku Nadzimuddin agreed and went to the hotel with his friends.

Upon arrival at the hotel, Tunku Nadzimuddin and his friend, Sham Shuddhuha, a 40-year-old lawyer, were allegedly dragged into an elevator by bodyguards of the Johor royal family. The rest of their friends were stopped in the lobby. In the elevator, they encountered Tunku Ismail, who was reportedly armed with a gun. Tunku Ismail allegedly began assaulting Tunku Nadzimuddin with the gun while his bodyguards attacked Sham Shuddhuha.

The two men were then taken to Room 2523, where they were allegedly confined. Tunku Nadzimuddin suffered a fractured nose, while Sham Shuddhuha fell unconscious and lost two teeth. Taking advantage of a moment alone, Tunku Nadzimuddin sent a text message to his mother, Tunku Dara Naquiah Tuanku Jaafar, asking for help.

Tunku Dara Naquiah contacted the police and rushed to the hotel with her brother and four police officers. After initially being stopped by bodyguards, they gained access to the room and took Tunku Nadzimuddin to Kuala Lumpur Hospital for treatment.

On 24 October 2008, Tunku Nadzimuddin filed a police report about the incident. The case attracted attention due to its involvement of royal family members and raised questions about legal immunity for royalty. The police began an investigation, eventually recording statements from 41 witnesses.

In the months following the incident, the Negeri Sembilan royal family expressed frustration with the perceived lack of progress in the investigation. By September 2009, nearly a year after the event, no charges had been filed against Tunku Ismail or his bodyguards. The Attorney-General, Tan Sri Abdul Gani Patail, stated that the case was still under investigation and that he would make a decision soon, emphasising the need for care and caution in such sensitive matters. Up until today, there was no update to the case.

=== Larkin tunnel incident ===
During the half-time interval of a second-round Piala FA match between Johor Darul Ta'zim (JDT) and T-Team F.C. at the Tan Sri Dato' Haji Hassan Yunos Stadium in Larkin, Johor Bahru, on 1 February 2014, an altercation broke out in the players' tunnel. JDT led 2–1 at the break.

T-Team's chief operating officer, Syahrizan Mohd Zain, alleged that Tunku Ismail, then president of the Johor Football Association (PBNJ), punched their Brazilian forward Evaldo Goncalves in the face as the player headed to the dressing room, and that a security officer kicked fitness coach Stefano Impagliazzo in the groin. Evaldo was reported to have suffered a nosebleed; Impagliazzo sustained injuries to his thigh. A third player, Fábio Flor, filed a separate police report in Kuala Terengganu alleging Tunku Ismail had threatened him with the words "I will kill you, this is my country".

T-Team refused to resume play for the second half and left the stadium. Police escorted the team to the Mersing border; the players were reportedly told not to wear their jerseys during the journey. Evaldo and Fabio Flor were said to have been traumatised by the episode and wanted to return to Brazil immediately.

JDT coach César Ferrando Jiménez filed a counter-report at the Johor Bahru police station, alleging that Impagliazzo had grabbed his collar and that a T-Team player had pushed him. T-Team's own player, Muhd Irfan Abdul Ghani, told the media he had been standing behind Evaldo throughout and had not seen any injuries. At a swearing-on-the-Quran ceremony later organised by T-Team officials, assistant coach Azlan Johar swore the assault on Evaldo had taken place; Irfan did not attend.

On Astro Arena's programme Dengan Izin, Tunku Ismail denied assaulting anyone, saying he had gone into the tunnel to separate the two sides and had told one of the foreign players to "respect this country". He added that Evaldo's face showed no visible injuries.

Police took statements from over 20 individuals in Terengganu and Johor, including Tunku Ismail, and investigated the case under Section 323 of the Penal Code for voluntarily causing hurt, which carries a maximum penalty of one year's imprisonment or a fine of RM2,000.

The Football Association of Malaysia (FAM) said it would not "choose favourites" and would summon Tunku Ismail to a disciplinary hearing if necessary. FAM's Disciplinary Committee went on to postpone the assault hearing, saying it did not want its decision to conflict with the police outcome. JDT was fined RM30,000 and given a warning for failing to provide adequate security at the stadium. FAM awarded JDT a 3–0 walkover victory, and T-Team were eliminated from the Piala FA. No charges followed, and FAM never concluded the hearing.

=== Assault of e-haling driver ===
On 28 May 2024, a deaf Grab driver named Ong Ing Keong was waiting to collect passengers outside the St Regis Hotel in Kuala Lumpur when he was allegedly assaulted by a member of Tunku Ismail's security team. The incident occurred when Ong was asked to move his vehicle as the royal entourage was departing the hotel lobby. A dashcam video later revealed that a man, believed to be a police officer accompanying Tunku Ismail, shouted at Ong before punching him in the face when Ong lowered his window to communicate.

Following the incident, Ong sought treatment at Kuala Lumpur Hospital for soft tissue injuries and lodged a police report at the Brickfields police station around 13:00 on the same day. The case was initially classified under Section 323 of the Penal Code for causing injury. However, later that evening, around 21:59, Kuala Lumpur police chief Rusdi Mohd Isa reported that Ong had filed a second report stating he did not wish to pursue the matter further, describing it as a "misunderstanding" that had been settled amicably.

This turn of events raised suspicions of a potential cover-up. It was later revealed by the Malaysian Deaf Advocacy and Well-being Organisation (DAWN) that Ong had actually filed only one report, while the police had prepared three additional reports which Ong signed without fully understanding their contents. DAWN also alleged that Ong was pressured at the police station to either accept compensation from a palace representative or face having his phone confiscated if the case went to court.

On 31 May, Ong denied withdrawing his initial police report and clarified the circumstances surrounding the additional reports. Meanwhile, Tunku Ismail issued a statement urging a thorough investigation while also claiming there was a "movement" attempting to tarnish the royal institution's reputation.

The case gained renewed attention on 14 August 2024, when rights group Lawyers for Liberty (LFL) released the dashcam footage of the incident during a press conference. LFL lawyers criticised the lack of action against the perpetrator despite clear video evidence, which had been in police possession since the day of the incident. Pressure was mounting on the police and Attorney General to take action, with various parties, including the Human Rights Commission of Malaysia (Suhakam), calling for transparency and justice in the case. On 4 November 2024, Lance Corporal Taufik Ismail was fined RM1000 by a Magistrate's Court after pleading guilty.

=== Public dispute with Syed Saddiq ===
Tunku Ismail has had a public dispute with Muar MP Syed Saddiq, which became prominent after the 2018 Malaysian general election. In December 2018, Tunku Ismail publicly criticised Syed Saddiq for sending birthday wishes to his brother, telling him to "save your sucking up for other people". In April 2019, Syed Saddiq claimed that Tunku Ismail had made political demands, including a request to cancel a Manny Pacquiao boxing match, which Syed Saddiq stated he could not fulfil.

The dispute continued into 2021. In June, Tunku Ismail described Syed Saddiq as a populist politician. Syed Saddiq responded by thanking Tunku Ismail for his "concern about Muar's residents" and stated he was open to criticism. The following month, Tunku Ismail accused Syed Saddiq of being a "drama queen" after the latter started a crowdfunding campaign for his legal expenses. In September 2021, during an Instagram Q&A session, Tunku Ismail suggested that Syed Saddiq should "jump off KLCC without a parachute" to get his attention.

The dispute resurfaced in 2026. In June, at a podcast session with young Johoreans held at the Tunku Mahkota Ismail Youth Centre in Muar, Tunku Ismail again characterised Syed Saddiq as a populist who performed for social media rather than serving his constituents. Without naming him, he said that many politicians were "Hollywood" and described "the most 'Hollywood' of all" as "the one near Muar" (Malay: Paling 'Hollywood' sekali yang dekat Muar), a remark widely interpreted as a reference to the Muar MP.

=== FAM player naturalisation scandal ===
On 28 September 2025, FIFA's Disciplinary Committee sanctioned the Football Association of Malaysia (FAM) after finding it had submitted "falsified or doctored" documents to prove the Malaysian heritage of seven foreign-born players. The ruling resulted in a CHF 350,000 fine for FAM and a 12-month ban for all seven players.

Tunku Ismail's role in the programme was central; he publicly confirmed on 25 October 2025, that a list of 27-28 potential players "had been presented to him", and he had "approved" the seven in question based on assurances that they had been vetted by both FAM and the National Registration Department (NRD).

FAM's official response was to attribute the incident to a "technical error" and to suspend its Secretary-General, Noor Azman Rahman. This move was strongly criticised by anti-graft watchdogs; the Center to Combat Corruption and Cronyism (C4) called it a "disturbing lack of accountability at the highest level", while Transparency International Malaysia noted it reflected a "wider pattern of opaque decision-making". Tunku Ismail also publicly disagreed with the suspension, stating it was "not right" and that "everyone should bear this responsibility" rather than scapegoat one individual.

Externally, Tunku Ismail rejected FIFA's findings, calling the decision a "sudden reversal" from a body that had previously cleared the players. He suggested external interference by Indonesian side, asking in a social media post, "Who was in New York?"

On 9 October, former Prime Minister Mahathir Mohamad called the affair a "deliberate attempt to cheat", asserting that it could only have been orchestrated by "somebody with power" who believes they are "above the law".

In March 2026, Tunku Ismail responded to an account on X that urged the public to never forget his alleged responsibility in the document falsification. In response, Tunku Ismail appeared to agree with the user and went further by suggesting that he be taken to court with any available evidence.

== Personal life ==
On 24 October 2014, Tunku Ismail married Che' Puan Mahkota Khaleeda at Istana Bukit Serene in a private ceremony. The solemnisation ceremony was performed by Johor mufti Dato' Mohd Tahrir Samsudin. The royal wedding reception took place at the Istana Besar on 8 November 2014.

The couple's first child is a daughter, Tunku Khalsom Aminah Sofiah, born on 25 June 2016. Their second child, a son, Tunku Iskandar Abdul Jalil Abu Bakar Ibrahim, was born 14 October 2017. A third child and second son, Tunku Abu Bakar Ibrahim, was born on 17 July 2019. A fourth child and second daughter, Tunku Zahrah Zarith Aziyah, was born on 21 April 2021. A fifth child and third daughter, Tunku Khadeeja Khayra Iskandariah, was born on 5 April 2026.

He is also a half third cousin of Sultan Nazrin Shah, the current Sultan of Perak since both share a common male ancestor Idris Shah I of Perak. He is also a grandnephew as well as nephew by marriage of Al-Sultan Abdullah, the current Sultan of Pahang and an 11th cousin of Tengku Muhammad Ismail, the Crown Prince of Terengganu since they both share a common male ancestor Tun Habib Abdul Majid Al-Aydrus.

== Titles and styles ==
Styles of Tunku Ismail
- Reference style: His Royal Highness
- Spoken style: Your Royal Highness
- Alternative style: Tuanku

Tunku Ismail's full style and title in Malay: Duli Yang Amat Mulia Tunku Mahkota Ismail Ibni Sultan Ibrahim, D.K., S.P.M.J, S.S.I.J, S.M.J., P.I.S, Pemangku Sultan Johor

in English: His Royal Highness Tunku Ismail Ibni Sultan Ibrahim, D.K., S.P.M.J, S.S.I.J, S.M.J., P.I.S, Regent of Johor

== Honours ==
=== Johor honours ===
- First Class of the Royal Family Order of Johor (DK I) (8 April 2009)
- Second Class of the Royal Family Order of Johor (DK II) (8 April 2006)
- Knight Grand Commander of the Order of the Crown of Johor (SPMJ) – Dato' (8 April 2005)
- Companion of the Order of the Crown of Johor (SMJ) (8 April 2004)
- Knight Grand Commander of the Order of Loyalty of Sultan Ismail of Johor (SSIJ) – Dato' (22 November 2010)
- Grand Knight of the Order of Sultan Ibrahim of Johor (SMIJ) – Dato' (30 March 2015)
- First Class of the Sultan Ibrahim Medal (PIS I)
- First Class of Gold Medal of the Sultan Ibrahim Coronation Medal (23 March 2015)
- First Class of the Sultan Ibrahim of Johor Medal (PSI I) (23 March 2017)
- Golden Jubilee of the Grup Gerak Khas Medal - Gold Medal (25 August 2015)

=== Honours of Malaysia ===
- Malaysia
  - 13th Yang di-Pertuan Agong Installation Medal (26 April 2007)
  - 15th Yang di-Pertuan Agong Installation Medal (24 April 2017)
  - 17th Yang di-Pertuan Agong Installation Medal (20 July 2024)
- Negeri Sembilan
  - Tuanku Muhriz Installation Medal (26 October 2009)
- Perak
  - Sultan Azlan Shah Silver Jubilee Medal (3 February 2009)

== Issue ==
Name	Born	Place birth	Age
Her Highness Tunku Khalsom Aminah Sofiah Binti Tunku Ismail Idris Abdul Majid Abu Bakar Iskandar	25 June 2016	Hospital Sultanah Aminah, Johor	10 years
His Royal Highness Tunku Iskandar Abdul Jalil Abu Bakar Ibrahim Ibni Tunku Ismail Idris Abdul Majid Abu Bakar Iskandar	14 October 2017	Hospital Sultanah Aminah, Johor	9 years
His Highness Tunku Abu Bakar Ibrahim Ibni Tunku Ismail Idris Abdul Majid Abu Bakar Iskandar	17 July 2019	Hospital Sultanah Aminah, Johor	7 years
Her Highness Tunku Zahrah Zarith Aziyah Binti Tunku Ismail Idris Abdul Majid Abu Bakar Iskandar	21 April 2021	Hospital Sultanah Aminah, Johor	5 years
Her Highness Tunku Khadeeja Khayra Iskandariah Binti Tunku Ismail Idris Abdul Majid Abu Bakar Iskandar	5 April 2026	Hospital Sultanah Aminah, Johor	7 months 1 day

== See also ==
- House of Temenggong
- Ibrahim Iskandar of Johor
- Sultan of Johor
- Sultanate of Johor
- Monarchies of Malaysia
- List of crimes committed by members of the Johor royal family

Tunku Ismail Idris House of Temenggong, Johor Born: 30 June 1984
Malaysian royalty
Lines of succession
Preceded by Heir apparent	Line of succession to the throne of Johor; 1st in line	Followed by Tunku Iskandar
