= Tunku Abdul Jalil =

- Tunku Laksamana of Johor (Prince Laksamana of Johor)
- Born: 5 July 1990; Istana Besar, Johor Bahru, Johor
- Died: 5 December 2015 (aged 25); Sultanah Aminah Hospital, Johor Bahru, Johor
- Burial: 6 December 2015; Mahmoodiah Royal Mausoleum, Johor Bahru, Johor
Names
- Tunku Abdul Jalil Iskandar Ibrahim Ismail Ibni Tunku Ibrahim Ismail
- House: Temenggong
- Father: Ibrahim Iskandar of Johor
- Mother: Raja Zarith Sofiah
- Religion: Sunni Islam
- Occupation: Zookeeper, police officer
- Other name: Lil
- Police career
- Country: Malaysia
- Department: Royal Malaysia Police: Special Actions Unit
- Service years: 2012–d. 2015
- Rank: Inspector
- Awards: General Service Medal

Almarhum Tunku Abdul Jalil ibni Sultan Ibrahim (né Tunku Abdul Jalil Iskandar Ibrahim Ismail Ibni Tunku Ibrahim Ismail, 5 July 1990 – 5 December 2015) was the Tunku Laksamana of Johor. He was born to members of the Johor Royal Family (his paternal side of the family) and the Perak Royal Family (his maternal side of the family).

Tunku Abdul Jalil was the fourth child of the current Yang di-Pertuan Agong (King) of Malaysia and Sultan of Johor, Sultan Ibrahim and his consort Raja Zarith Sofiah. He was the fourth grandson of the previous Sultan of Johor, Sultan Iskandar and the previous Sultan of Perak, Sultan Idris Shah II.

== Life and education ==
Tunku Abdul Jalil was born on 5 July 1990 at Istana Besar, Johor Bahru. He received his early education at Sekolah Sri Utama Johor Bahru and then later at the Yayasan Pelajaran Johor (YPJ) Zaikarim Johor Baru International School. He was a degree holder in Zoological and Conservation Studies from the Zoological Society of London in the United Kingdom.

Upon his return from London, he became a volunteer at the Sepilok Orang Utan Rehabilitation Centre in Sandakan, Sabah. He was also a volunteer at the Singapore Zoological Garden's Reptile and Veterinary Department for a year and London Zoo for almost two years.

Tunku Abdul Jalil was also active in various charity organisations including the Johor Spastic Association, the Malaysian Nature Society, the Orangutan Appeal UK foundation and the Malaysian Red Crescent Society. For sports, he did not play Polo as other royalty. This was due to his allergy to horsehair, however, he showed interest in Sailing. In 2013, he introduced the Malaysian Sailing League and a youth sailing programme to Malaysia. He received the President Development Award from the International Sailing Federation (ISAF; now known as World Sailing) in 2014.

== Law enforcement career ==
In 2011, Tunku Abdul Jalil enrolled in the Royal Malaysian Police (RMP) Probationary Inspector Course, Intake 1/2011, at the Malaysian Police Training Centre (PULAPOL) in Jalan Semarak, Kuala Lumpur. Upon completion of the nine-month training programme, he was commissioned as a Probationary Inspector on 8 January 2012.

Following in his father's footsteps as a special forces-trained officer, he underwent the Special forces selection course (Special Actions Unit) in 2013. He successfully joined the elite counter-terrorism unit of the RMP, becoming an operative within the Special Actions Unit (Malay: Unit Tindakhas, abbreviated as UTK).

In 2015, he was promoted to the rank of Inspector. Tunku Abdul Jalil remains notable as the first and only member of Malaysian royalty to have served in the Royal Malaysian Police.

== Illness and death ==
Tunku Abdul Jalil was confirmed to have stage four liver cancer in December 2014 and had sought treatment at a hospital in Guangzhou, China.

Tunku Abdul Jalil died on 5 December 2015 in Royal Ward, Sultanah Aminah Hospital, Johor Bahru at the age of 25 due to cancer. On 6 December 2015, he was accorded a royal state funeral in Istana Besar, Johor Bahru and was buried next to the grave of his late grandfather, Almarhum Sultan Iskandar ibni Almarhum Sultan Ismail at the Mahmoodiah Royal Mausoleum, Johor Bahru.

== Honours ==
=== Johor ===
- First Class of the Royal Family Order of Johor (DK I) (22 November 2012)
- Knight Grand Commander of the Order of the Crown of Johor (SPMJ) – Dato' (15 March 2015)
- Grand Knight of the Order of Sultan Ibrahim of Johor (SMIJ) – Dato' (30 March 2015)
- Knight Commander of the Order of the Crown of Johor (DPMJ) – Dato' (11 April 2009)
- First Class of the Sultan Ibrahim Medal (PIS I)
- First Class of the Sultan Ibrahim Coronation Medal (23 March 2015)

=== National ===
- Malaysia
- General Service Medal (7 January 2012)

== Legacy ==
- The Tunku Laksamana Abdul Jalil Mosque at the Royal Malaysia Police's Johor Contingent Headquarters was named after him.
- The Tunku Laksamana Johor Cancer Foundation.
- The Dewan Tunku Laksamana Abdul Jalil at Politeknik Ibrahim Sultan, Pasir Gudang, Johor was named after him.
- Tunku Abdul Jalil Conservation Center (Malay: Pusat Pemuliharaan Tunku Abdul Jalil), Tengah Island was launched in 2018 by Sultan Ibrahim.

== Ancestry ==
Ancestors of Tunku Abdul Jalil

16. Sultan Ibrahim bin Abu Bakar of Johor
8. Sultan Ismail bin Ibrahim of Johor
17. Ungku Maimuna binti Ungku Abdul Majid
4. Sultan Iskandar bin Ismail of Johor
18. Ungku Ahmad bin Ungku Muhammad Khalid
9. Ungku Tun Amina binti Ungku Ahmad
19. Ungku Khadija binti Ungku Muhammad
2. Sultan Ibrahim Ismail of Johor
20. Henry David Trevorrow
10. Reginald George Trevorrow
21. Florence Louisa Capling
5. Enche' Besar Hajjah Kalsum binti Abdullah (née Josephine Ruby Trevorrow)
22. Thomas Alderman
11. Ruby May Alderman
1. Tunku Abdul Jalil
24. Sultan Idris Shah I of Perak
12. Sultan Iskandar bin Idris of Perak
25. Cik Ngah Manah binti Manda Duwayat
6. Sultan Idris Shah II of Perak
26. Raja Kulop Muhammad Kramat bin Raja Alang Iskandar
13. Raja Puteh Umi Kalsum binti Raja Kulop Muhammad Kramat
27. Che Ken Uda Sari binti Abdul Rahman
3. Raja Zarith Sofiah binti Idris
28. Raja Haji Harun al-Rashid bin Idris Murshid
14. Raja Arif Shah bin Raja Haji Harun al-Rashid
29. Cik Haji Ngah Uteh Mariah binti Haji Sulaiman
7. Raja Muzwin binti Raja Arif Shah
30. Abdullah
15. Cik Puan Aziza binti Abdullah
