= Raja Zarith Sofiah =

Raja Permaisuri Agong since 2024

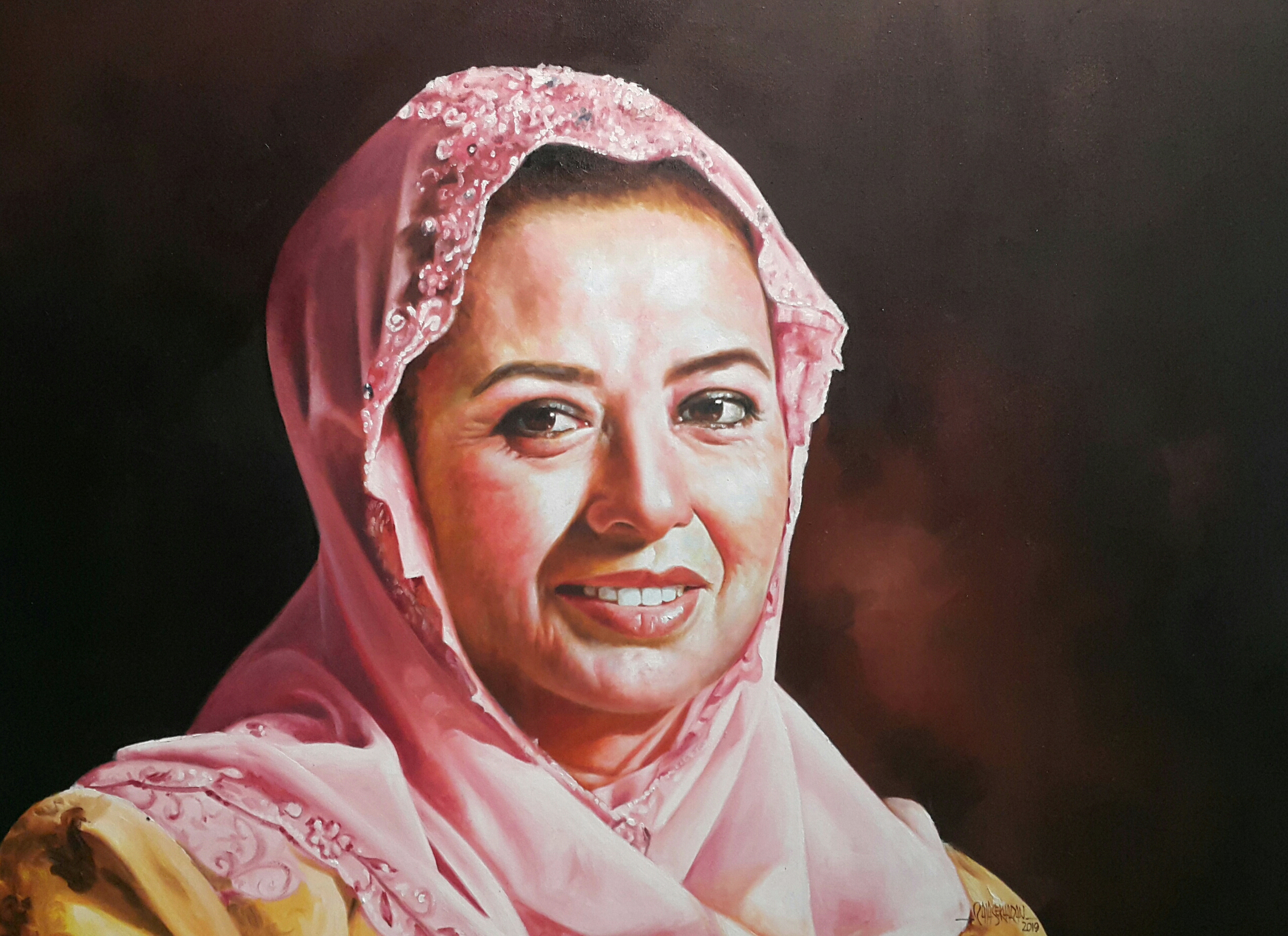

Queen consort of Malaysia
- Tenure: 31 January 2024 – present
- Installation: 20 July 2024
- Predecessor: Tunku Azizah Aminah Maimunah Iskandariah

Permaisuri of Johor
- Tenure: 23 January 2010 – present
- Coronation: 23 March 2015
- Predecessor: Sultanah Zanariah (as Sultanah)
- Born: Raja Zarith Sofiah binti Raja Idris Shah; 14 August 1959 (age 67); Batu Gajah Hospital, Perak, Malaya
- Spouse: Sultan Ibrahim (m. 1982)
- Issue: Tunku Ismail; Tunku Tun Aminah; Tunku Idris Iskandar; Tunku Abdul Jalil; Tunku Abdul Rahman; Tunku Abu Bakar
Names
- Raja Zarith Sofiah binti Almarhum Sultan Idris Al-Mutawakil Alallahi Shah
Regnal name
- Raja Zarith Sofiah binti Almarhum Sultan Idris Shah
- House: Siak-Perak (by birth); Temenggong (by marriage)
- Father: Sultan Idris Shah II
- Mother: Raja Perempuan Muzwin
- Religion: Sunni Islam

Raja Zarith Sofiah binti Almarhum Sultan Idris Shah (Jawi: راج زاريث صوفية بنت المرحوم سلطان إدريس شاه; born 14 August 1959) is Queen of Malaysia and Permaisuri (Queen consort) of Johor as the wife of Sultan Ibrahim ibni Almarhum Sultan Iskandar. She was born as a member of the Perak royal family. While still attending Somerville College, Oxford, she married the heir to the throne of Johor. Now a mother of six, she participates in the work of non-governmental organisations and universities, and writes a periodical column for a newspaper.

== Early life and education ==
Raja Zarith Sofiah was born at Batu Gajah Hospital, in Perak, on 14 August 1959 as the third child and second daughter of Sultan Idris Shah II of Perak and Raja Perempuan Muzwin binti Raja Ariff Shah. Her parents were first step-cousins once removed. She is a second step-cousin of Sultan Azlan Shah of Perak. Sultan Azlan's paternal grandfather (Sultan Abdul Jalil Shah), her paternal grandfather (Sultan Iskandar Shah) and her mother's paternal grandfather (Raja Harun al-Rashid) were children of Sultan Idris Shah I of Perak, all with different mothers.

She attended Datin Khadijah Primary School and then Raja Perempuan Kelsom School in Kuala Kangsar, before moving on to Cheltenham Ladies' College to complete her secondary education. She attended Somerville College, Oxford and obtained her Bachelor of Arts in Chinese studies from the University of Oxford in 1983 and her Master of Arts in 1986.

== Current activities ==
Raja Zarith Sofiah is the chancellor of Universiti Teknologi Malaysia, the Royal Advisor to the Malaysian Red Crescent Society, the Chairman of the Yayasan (Foundation) Raja Zarith Sofiah Negeri Johor (YRZSNJ) of the State of Johor and the Chairman of the Tunku Laksamana Johor Cancer Foundation (TLJCF) of Johor. She is also a Fellow of the School of Language Studies and Linguistics, Universiti Kebangsaan Malaysia (UKM). She delivered the keynote address at the 2011 UKM International Language Conference. She is the Royal Patron of Oxford University Malaysia Club [OUMC] (beginning Michaelmas 2011).

Raja Zarith is a strong advocate of improving the use of English in Malaysia. In addition to Malay and English, she speaks Mandarin Chinese, Italian and French.

She has authored several children's books (illustrator also), including Puteri Gunung Ledang, and writes for The Star's "Mind Matters" column (previously also in the newspaper New Straits Times).

Raja Zarith supports various charitable and non-governmental organisations. She is a patron of the Spastic Children's Association of Johor, the Rotary Club of Tebrau Heart Fund and the Malaysian English Language Teaching Association. She is also the Chair of the Community Services Committee of the Malaysian Red Crescent Society.

Raja Zarith Sofiah is also active in religious activities. There is a foundation which is named after her which is called Yayasan Raja Zarith Sofiah Negeri Johor (YRZSNJ). It was launched on 28 November 2012 at the Kuala Lumpur campus of Universiti Teknologi Malaysia The foundation's purpose is to generate funds for various educational programmes. The foundation was set up after the Sultan of Johor and she agreed with the proposal by Universiti Teknologi Malaysia, in line with the Royal Johor Institution, in developing the teachings of Islam.

== Marriage and children ==
On 22 September 1982, Raja Zarith Sofiah married the then Tunku Mahkota (Crown Prince) of Johor, Tunku Ibrahim Ismail. After the marriage, she was styled as Her Highness Raja Zarith Sofiah, Isteri Tunku Mahkota (Consort of the Crown Prince) of Johor.

Tunku Ibrahim Ismail was proclaimed the 25th Sultan of Johor after the death of his father on 23 January 2010. On 22 November 2010 in conjunction with Sultan Ibrahim's 52nd birthday celebration, Raja Zarith was bestowed upon her the style of Duli Yang Maha Mulia (Her Royal Highness), until her coronation took place on 23 March 2015. On her coronation day, she was conferred the title Permaisuri of Johor (The Queen consort) with the style as Her Majesty.

She and Sultan Ibrahim have six children:

- Tunku Ismail Idris Abdul Majid Abu Bakar, the Tunku Mahkota of Johor (born 30 June 1984)
- Tunku Tun Aminah Maimunah Iskandariah (born 8 April 1986)
- Tunku Idris Iskandar, the Tunku Temenggong of Johor (born 25 December 1987)
- Tunku Abdul Jalil, the Tunku Laksamana of Johor (5 July 1990 – 5 December 2015)
- Tunku Abdul Rahman, the Tunku Panglima of Johor (born 5 February 1993)
- Tunku Abu Bakar, the Tunku Putera of Johor (born 30 May 2001)

== Notable published works ==
- On Common Ground: A Collection of Articles (2013) ISBN 978-967-415-095-2

== Titles and styles ==
Styles of Raja Zarith Sofiah
- Reference style: Her Majesty
- Spoken style: Your Majesty
- Alternative style: Tuanku

As a Permaisuri of Johor, Raja Zarith Sofiah's full style and title in Malay: Duli Yang Maha Mulia Raja Zarith Sofiah binti Almarhum Sultan Idris Shah, D.K. (I), D.K. (II), D.M.N., S.P.M.J., S.I.M.J., P.S.I., D.K. (Perak), S.P.C.M., Permaisuri Johor

in English: Her Majesty Raja Zarith Sofiah binti Almarhum Sultan Idris Shah, D.K. (I), D.K. (II), D.M.N., S.P.M.J., S.I.M.J., P.S.I., D.K. (Perak), S.P.C.M., Permaisuri of Johor

In her tenure as a Raja Permaisuri Agong, Raja Zarith Sofiah's full style and title in Malay: Kebawah Duli Yang Maha Mulia Seri Paduka Baginda Raja Permaisuri Agong Raja Zarith Sofiah

in English: Her Majesty Raja Zarith Sofiah, Queen of Malaysia or simply Her Majesty The Queen of Malaysia

== Honours ==
=== Honours of Johor ===
- First Class of the Royal Family Order of Johor (DK I)
- Second Class of the Royal Family Order of Johor (DK II, 15 April 1996)
- Knight Grand Commander of the Order of the Crown of Johor (SPMJ) – Datin Paduka
- Grand Knight of the Order of Sultan Ibrahim of Johor (SMIJ) – Datin Paduka (23 March 2017)
- First Class of Gold Medal of the Sultan Ibrahim Coronation Medal (23 March 2015)

=== National and state honours ===
- Malaysia
  - Recipient of the Order of the Crown of the Realm (DMN) (5 June 2024)
- Perak
  - Recipient of the Royal Family Order of Perak (DK) (15 July 2024)
  - Knight Grand Commander of the Order of Cura Si Manja Kini (SPCM) – Dato' Seri (4 March 1983)

=== Honorary doctorate ===
- United Kingdom
  - Honorary Doctorate in Letters from the University of Nottingham – (22 July 2017)
  - Honorary Doctorate in Psychology from the University of Reading – (1 August 2026)

Raja Zarith Sofiah Royal House of Perak (Malacca) by birth House of Temenggong by marriage Born: 14 August 1959
Malaysian royalty
| Preceded by Tunku Puan Zanariah (as Sultanah of Johor) | Permaisuri of Johor (Queen consort of Johor); 2010–present | Incumbent |
| Preceded by Tunku Azizah Aminah Maimunah Iskandariah (Tengku Ampuan of Pahang) | Raja Permaisuri Agong (Queen of Malaysia); 2024–present | Incumbent |
