= STM (Turkish company) =

Defense company of Turkey

STM (Savunma Teknolojileri Mühendislik ve Ticaret A.Ş.)
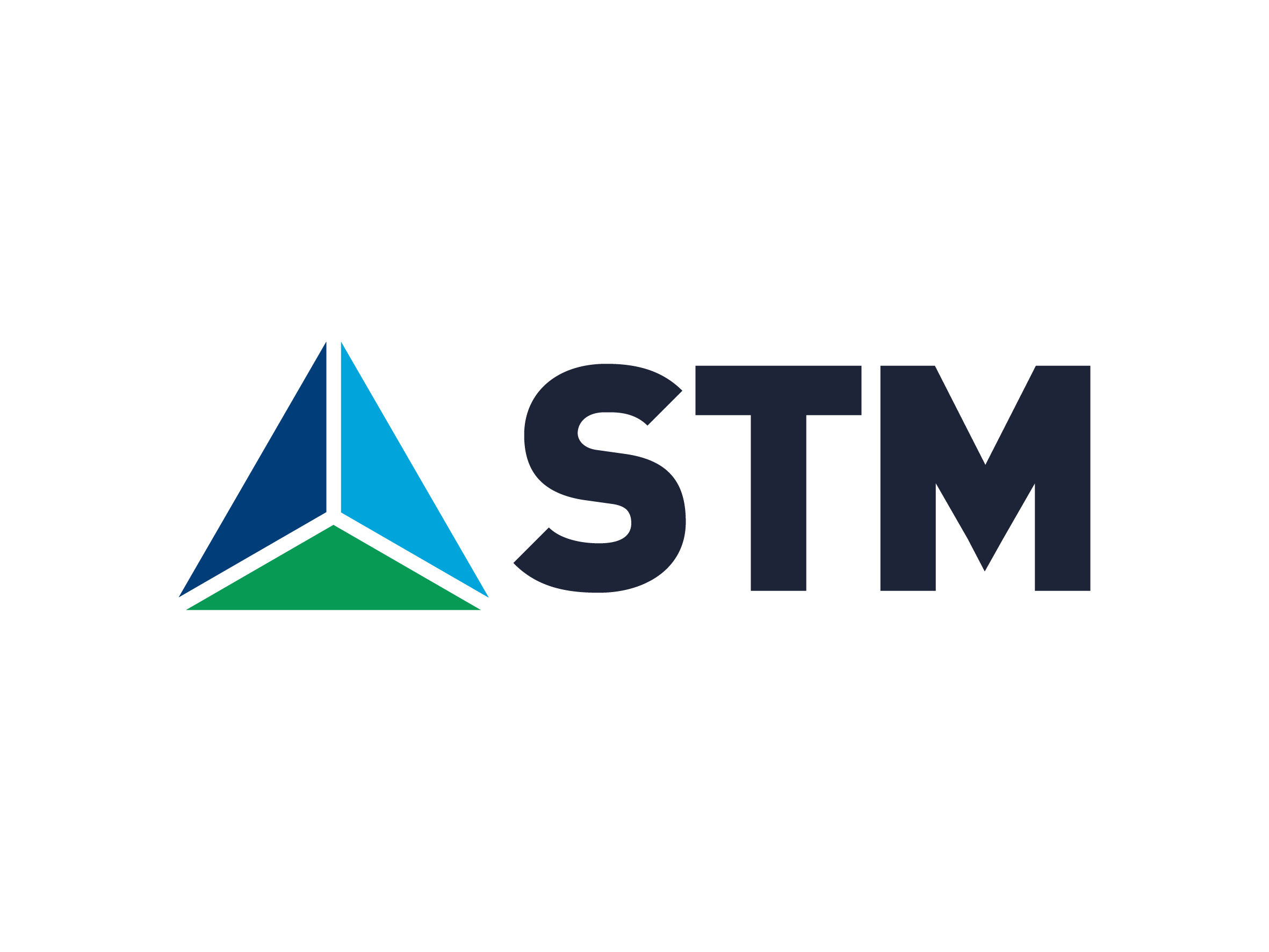
- Type: Public Company
- Industry: Defence; Technology; Engineering; Consultancy
- Founded: 1991
- Founder: Defence Industry Executive Committee
- Headquarters: Ankara, Turkey
- Key people: Özgür Güleryüz
- Products: Naval platforms, Cybersecurity, Autonomous Systems, Radar Systems, Satellite Technologies, Command and Control Systems, Certification and Consultancy
- Website: https://www.stm.com.tr/

STM (Savunma Teknolojileri Mühendislik ve Ticaret A.Ş. / Defense Technologies Engineering and Trade Co AS) is a defence company in Turkey, operating in the civil, public (including military) and private sectors. STM produces various products and services in the fields of air, naval and land defense, as well as software and cyberspace.

STM is one of the contractors of the Turkish Armed Forces, supplying security forces, particularly the Turkish Naval Forces, with indigenous systems and solutions.

== History ==
STM was established in 1991 by decree from the Turkish Government’s Defence Industry Executive Committee to provide project management, system engineering, technology transfer, technical and logistical support, and consultancy services to the Presidency of the Republic of Turkey, Presidency of Defense Industries (SSB) and the Turkish Armed Forces (TSK).

STM was included in the Defense News Top 100, which ranks the world’s top 100 defense companies for three consecutive years, starting in 2018.

== Governance ==
STM is headed by the Chairman of the Board Prof. Dr. İhsan Kaya and General Manager Özgür Güleryüz.

== Operations ==
STM has three main divisions: engineering, technology and consultancy. It operates in the fields of military naval platforms, cybersecurity, autonomous systems, radar systems, satellite technologies, command and control systems, certification and consultancy.

== Major projects ==
STM's major projects include:

- MILGEM project: Istanbul-class frigate, Ada-class corvette

STM served as the main subcontractor in the construction of MİLGEM Ada-Class Corvettes, Turkey’s first national corvette project.

- Reis-class submarine

STM has taken part in the Reis-Class (Type-214) New Type Submarine program for the Turkish Navy which is powered by air-independent propulsion systems and has completed the deliveries of the hull Torpedo Section 50.

- TAI/AgustaWestland T129 ATAK helicopter – mission support system

STM also contributed to the digital map support project in the ATAK Helicopter project in 2011 and launched the NATO Integration Core (INT-CORE) project.

- ALTAY main battle tank – Command, Control, Communications and Information System
- Modernisation of Pakistan Navy Agosta 90B class submarines

In 2016, STM completed the modernization of the French-made Agosta 90B Khalid-Class Submarines in the inventory of Pakistan. The modernization of the two submarines was completed in Turkey, whereas the modernization of the last submarine is continuing in Karachi, Pakistan.

- Production of Turkish electronic identity cards
- Engineering support for Pakistan's build of the Fleet Tanker, PNS Moawin (A39)
- Production of the STM Kargu rotary wing drone
- STM Tengiz is an advanced Extra Large Unmanned Underwater Vehicle (XLUUV) developed by Turkish defense company STM Savunma (STM) to serve as an autonomous, long-endurance underwater platform for maritime defense and security. These features are: Intelligence, Surveillance, and Reconnaissance (ISR), Offensive Mine Warfare, Anti-Submarine Warfare (ASW), Electronic Warfare (EW) & Signals Intelligence (SIGINT), Seabed Mapping & Critical Infrastructure Inspection.
- STM ALPAGU-B is a fixed-wing loitering munition developed by Turkish defense company STM and publicly unveiled during the SAHA 2026 defense exhibition.

The system is an enlarged derivative of the original ALPAGU loitering munition and is designed for beyond-line-of-sight precision strike missions.

According to STM, ALPAGU-B features a line-of-sight operational range of up to 40 km, artificial intelligence-assisted target tracking capabilities, low radar cross-section characteristics, and a high-explosive impact warhead.

The platform is part of STM's expanding family of loitering munitions and autonomous strike systems, which also includes the KARGU and TOGAN platforms.
