= Ibrahim Iskandar of Johor =

King of Malaysia since 2024

Sultan Ibrahim
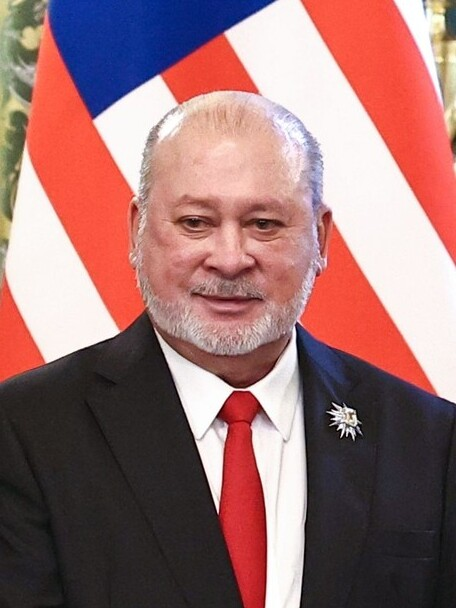
- Ibrahim in 2025

King of Malaysia
- Reign: 31 January 2024 – present
- Installation: 20 July 2024
- Predecessor: Abdullah
- Deputy: Nazrin Shah

Sultan of Johor
- Reign: 23 January 2010 – present
- Coronation: 23 March 2015
- Predecessor: Iskandar
- Heir apparent: Tunku Ismail Idris
- Born: 22 November 1958 (age 67); Johor Bahru, Johor, Federation of Malaya
- Spouse: Raja Zarith Sofiah (m. 1982)
- Issue: Tunku Ismail Idris; Tunku Tun Aminah; Tunku Idris Iskandar; Tunku Abdul Jalil; Tunku Abdul Rahman; Tunku Abu Bakar
Names
- Tunku Ibrahim Ismail ibni Tunku Mahmood Iskandar
Regnal name
- Sultan Ibrahim ibni Almarhum Sultan Iskandar
- House: Temenggong
- Father: Iskandar of Johor
- Mother: Josephine Ruby Trevorrow
- Religion: Sunni Islam
- Military career
- Allegiance: Malaysia; Johor
- Branch: Malaysian Army; Royal Johor Military Force
- Service years: 1977–present
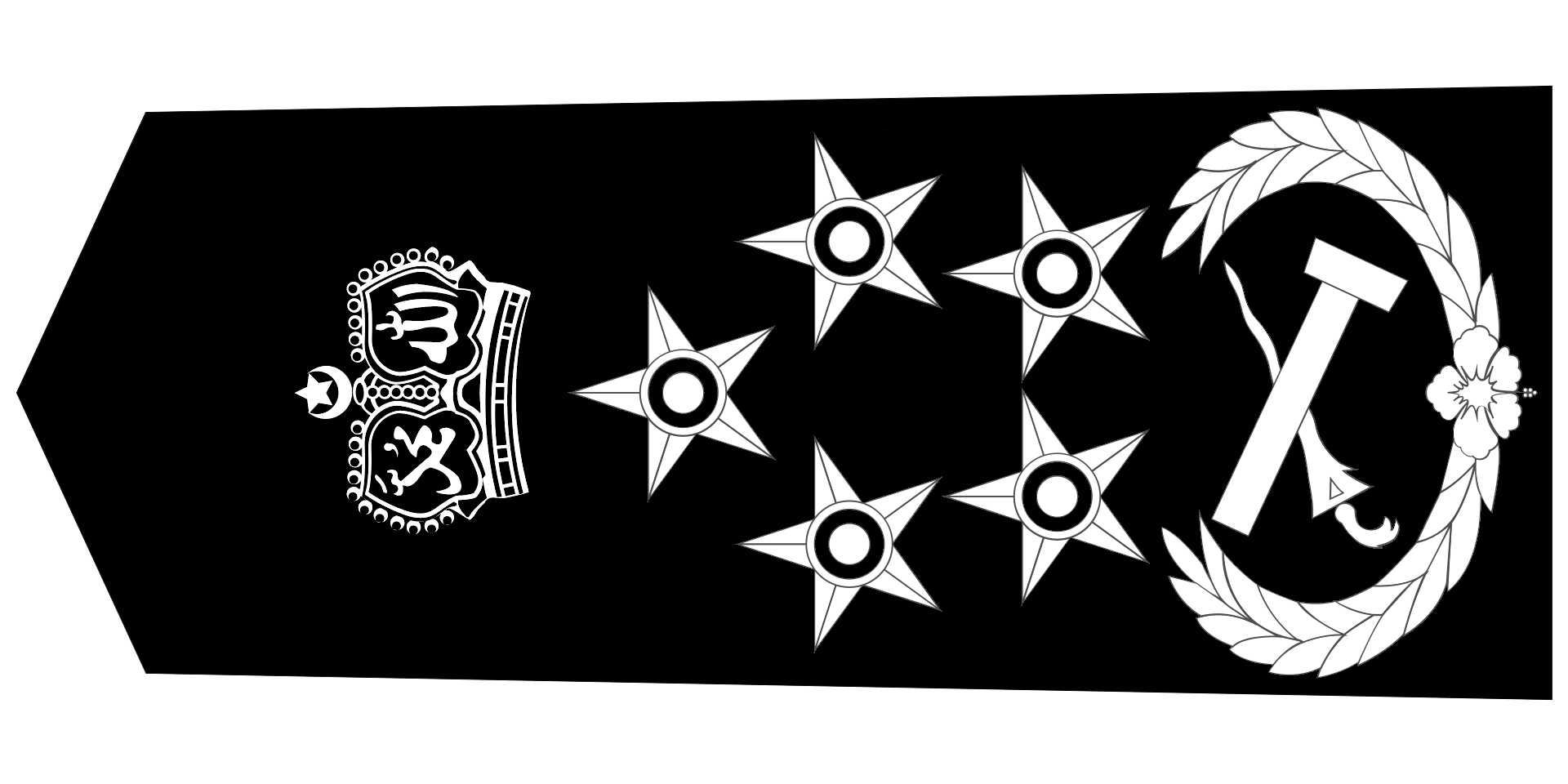
- Rank: Field marshal Admiral of the Fleet Marshal of the Air Force (Commander-in-chief) Commandant (JMF) Honorary Commissioner-in-Chief (Royal Malaysia Police)
- Unit: Johor Military Forces

Ibrahim ibni Iskandar (Note: Jawi: سلطان إبراهيم ابن سلطان إسکندر) (born Tunku Ibrahim Ismail ibni Tunku Mahmood Iskandar, 22 November 1958) is King of Malaysia and Sultan of Johor.

Ibrahim was born during the reign of his great-grandfather, Sultan Sir Ibrahim, and became heir apparent when his father, Sultan Iskandar, acceded to the throne of Johor in 1981. He was named Crown Prince of Johor on 3 July 1981. He was educated at Trinity Grammar School, in Sydney, Australia. In 1982, he married Raja Zarith Sofiah. They had six children, including Ismail Idris and Aminah Maimunah Iskandariah.

Ibrahim became Sultan of Johor upon his father's death in 2010. On 31 January 2024, Ibrahim was sworn in as the King of Malaysia, having been elected to a five-year term on 27 October 2023. Significant events in his reign have included his installation in July 2024.

== Early life and education ==
Tunku Ibrahim was born on 22 November 1958 at the Sultanah Aminah Hospital, Johor Bahru, during the reign of his great-grandfather, Sultan Ibrahim of Johor. He was the third child and eldest son of Sultan Iskandar by his first wife, Josephine Ruby Trevorrow, an English woman from Torquay. Trevorrow temporarily took on the name Khalsom binti Abdullah following her marriage to Iskandar. Ibrahim's mother later remarried and returned to England. Ibrahim's great-grandfather died in London on 8 May 1959. Thus, Ibrahim's grandfather, Ismail, became Sultan of Johor.

Ibrahim completed his secondary education at Trinity Grammar School in Sydney, Australia from 1968 until 1970. After finishing high school, he was sent to the Army Training Centre (PULADA) in Kota Tinggi for basic military training. He also received military training in the United States, at Fort Benning, Georgia, and later at Fort Bragg, North Carolina.

== Crown Prince of Johor (1981–2010) ==
Ibrahim was appointed as the Crown Prince of Johor on 3 July 1981, and has primarily resided at the Istana Pasir Pelangi since then. He served as the regent of Johor between 26 April 1984 and 25 April 1989 when his father served his term as the Yang di-Pertuan Agong. In recent years, Ibrahim gradually took over some state duties and functions from his aging father. These included attending the 211th Conference of Rulers, where Ibrahim and Abdullah, the Crown Prince of Pahang, represented their fathers in the meetings, among other state functions.

Shortly before Filipino opposition politician Ninoy Aquino was assassinated at Manila International Airport on 21 August 1983, Ibrahim met Aquino upon his arrival in Singapore and later brought him to meet other Malaysian leaders across the Johor–Singapore Causeway. Once in Johor, Aquino also met with Ibrahim's father, Iskandar, who was a close friend.

== Sultan of Johor (2010–present) ==
A few hours before his father's death on 22 January 2010, Tunku Ibrahim was appointed as the Regent of Johor, following medical reports that suggested Sultan Iskandar's impending death. Sultan Iskandar died on the same night, and Tunku Ibrahim was installed as the Sultan of Johor the following morning. The Menteri Besar (Chief Minister) of Johor, Abdul Ghani Othman cited that Sultan Ibrahim and immediate members of the royal family would undertake a mourning period of 40 days. During the mourning season, Sultan Ibrahim made his inaugural presence at the Conference of Rulers in February 2010 as the Sultan of Johor.

On 30 June 2011, Sultan Ibrahim drove the last train from Tanjong Pagar railway station, having received tuition from Chief Locomotive Inspector Hasnol Azahari Aman of Keretapi Tanah Melayu to enable him to do this. He stated that he wished to do this as his grandfather, Sultan Ismail, had opened the causeway between Singapore and Malaya in 1923, and that it was appropriate for him to drive the last train out of the station.

Sultan Ibrahim also declared Muar as Johor's new royal capital, replacing Johor Bahru, on 5 February 2012. This coincided with the Mawlid celebrations.

Sultan Ibrahim became the first ruler of Johor to celebrate his birthday celebration in Muar on 22 November 2012. He picked the town because it was "rich in history and tradition besides being peaceful, beautiful and progressive". He wanted the state government to gazette all the old buildings in the town as a state heritage. He also wants the local authorities to preserve the cleanliness of the Muar River which could be done by relocating the bus and taxi terminals elsewhere.

Johor, as with the former Unfederated Malay States of Perlis, Kedah, Kelantan and Terengganu, used to rest on Fridays and Saturdays, in contrast with the former Federated Malay States as well as Malacca, Penang, Sabah and Sarawak and the Federal Territory which observe their weekends on Saturdays and Sundays. Johor, together with Perlis, moved their weekend to Saturday and Sunday on 1 January 1994 to synchronise with neighboring Singapore as well as with Kuala Lumpur, as Johor by then was a quickly industrialising state.

However, on 22 November 2013, on Sultan Ibrahim's birthday celebrations, he decreed that Johor would move its weekend back to Friday and Saturday, to enable Muslims in the state to attend their Friday prayers, effective 1 January 2014. This move was not without controversy due to the disruptions it caused, particularly for private businesses dealing with Singapore. The private sector nevertheless continues to rest on Saturdays and Sundays.

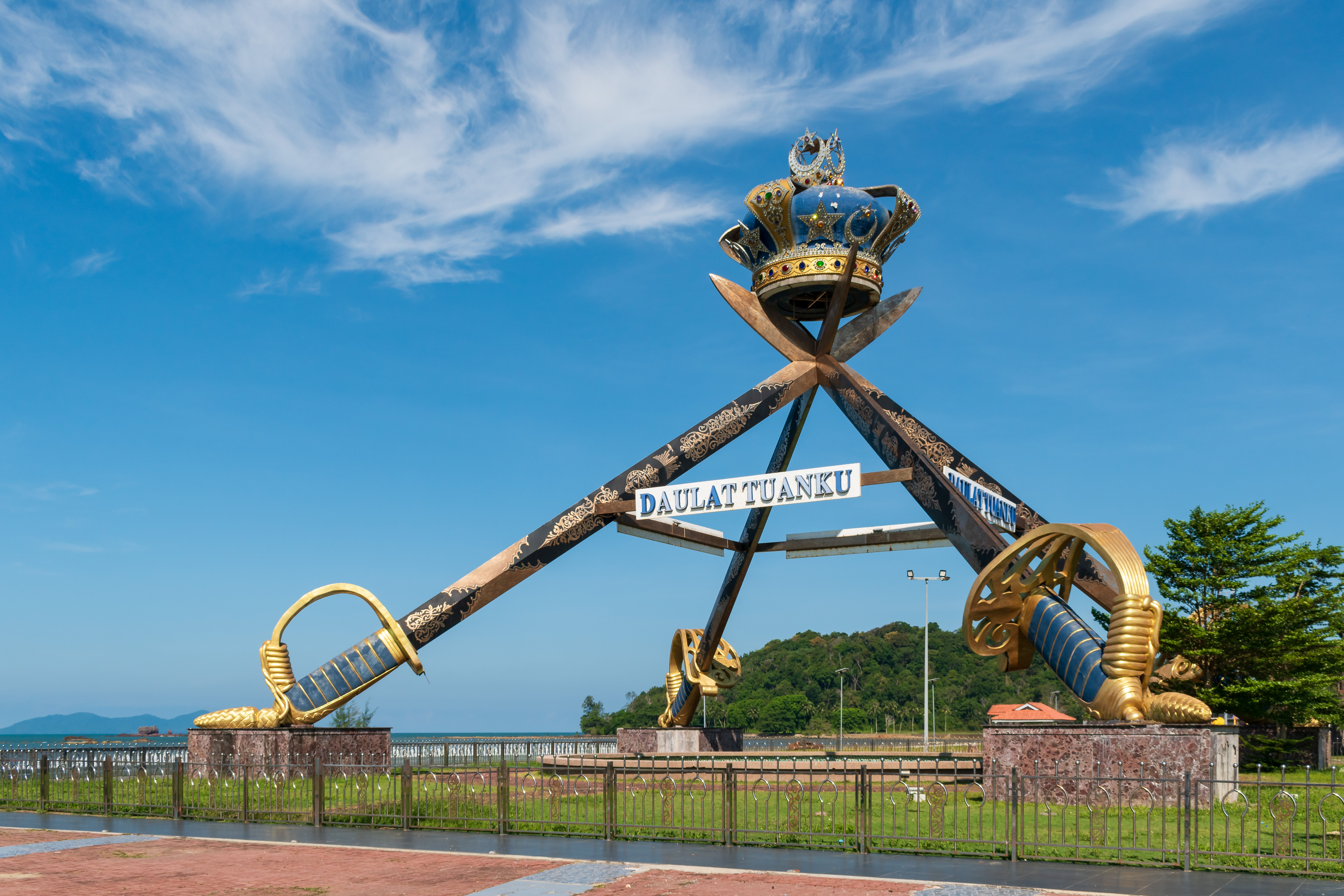
Monument in Mersing commemorating Ibrahim's coronation as Sultan of Johor

Sultan Ibrahim was crowned as the Sultan of Johor on 23 March 2015. The last coronation was that of his grandfather Sultan Ismail on 10 February 1960. From 2015 onwards, 23 March was made an annual state public holiday as the Sultan's official birthday, replacing the public holiday on 22 November, the Sultan's actual birthday.

In August 2015, Sultan Ibrahim decreed that the name of Kulaijaya district be reverted to its former name of Kulai. He also decreed Nusajaya to be renamed to Iskandar Puteri, as well as renaming Ledang District to Tangkak District.

Sultan Ibrahim issued a decree banning vaping in Johor effective 1 January 2016. The purposes of the ban was for the sake of the health of the residents of Johor. Kelantan and Terengganu followed soon after.

Ibrahim is noted for advocating religious moderation and has criticised the creeping Arabisation of Malaysian Muslim culture. Despite being the only sultan in Malaysia without tertiary (post-secondary) education, he has promoted quality education for Johor.

== King of Malaysia (2024–present) ==
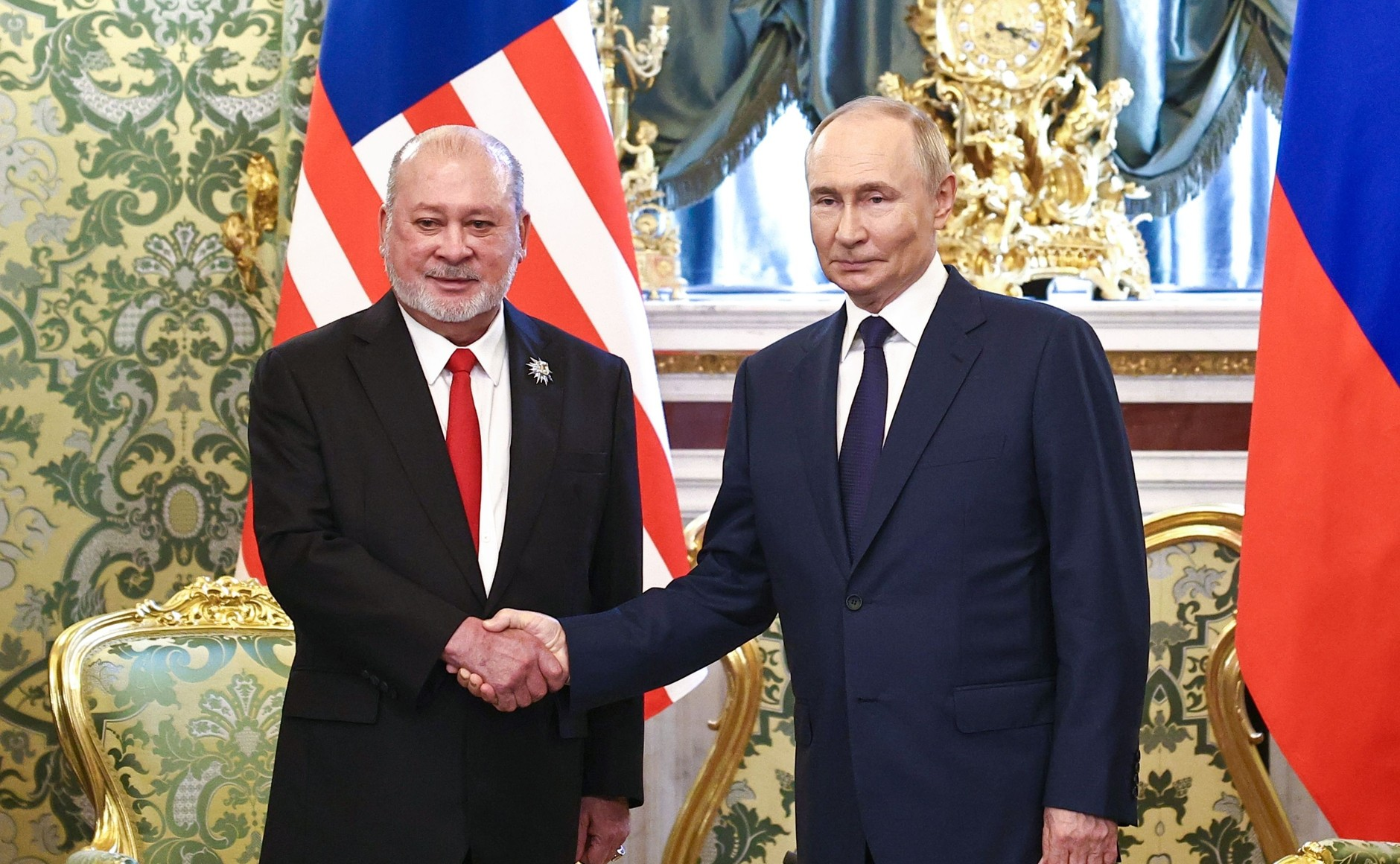
Sultan Ibrahim with Russian President Vladimir Putin, 6 August 2025.

On 27 October 2023, the Conference of Rulers elected Sultan Ibrahim as the 17th Yang di-Pertuan Agong (King of Malaysia), replacing Sultan Abdullah of Pahang. During this time, the Conference of Rulers also elected Sultan Nazrin Shah of Perak to a third term as the Deputy Yang di-Pertuan Agong.

His official swearing in and possession of the Istana Negara occurred on 31 January 2024.

The Ceremonial Installation of Sultan Ibrahim as the 17th Yang di-Pertuan Agong took place at the Throne Hall of the Istana Negara on 20 July 2024, a few months after his assumption of the throne. The installation featured traditional Malay rites, ceremonial cannon fire, and was attended by various national dignitaries.

== Controversies and issues ==
=== Allegations of criminal misconduct ===
Occasional reports of alleged criminal misconduct from the 1980s onwards marred Tunku Ibrahim's reputation somewhat, albeit to a much lesser extent than his father, Sultan Iskandar, whose past crimes had received considerable attention from mainstream media. In the 1980s, he was convicted of shooting a man dead in a nightclub during a feud, but was quickly pardoned.

In late 1992 to early 1993, Tunku Ibrahim also experienced fallout from the Gomez Incident– in which his father and younger brother, Tunku Abdul Majid were accused of two separate but related incidences of assault which provoked nationwide moral outrage and ultimately resulted in constitutional amendments to allow members of royalty to be prosecuted for criminal wrongdoing. During that period of time, the press, which was supported by the Malaysian government, launched a series of press reports on the history of alleged incidents of royal wrongdoings, of which parliamentarians highlighted that Tunku Ibrahim had been accused in at least two cases of assault in the 1980s. This included Rahim Mohd Nor, who was allegedly assaulted by Tunku Ibrahim and who described his assault experience as an act of sadism by Tunku Ibrahim.

In March 2005, a member of the Malaysian royalty allegedly assaulted a young woman by the name of Yasmin whom he accused of two-timing him with another policeman. The victim's father, Mohd Yasin, later lodged a police report which alleged that the assault culprit was Tunku Ibrahim, the then Tunku Mahkota of Johor.

=== Other incidents ===
In October 2005, a brawl occurred on Pulau Rawa after a Johor prince allegedly gatecrashed a wedding party. The prince ordered some guests off the island after a fight broke out when a woman refused to dance with one of the gatecrashers. The locals, who felt offended by the woman's attitude, went off but soon returned with golf clubs and weapons and started a fight. In the process, several people were injured and sent to hospital, while five others were arrested, including a 20-year-old prince from the Johor royal family. The names of the culprits were not released by the police, who chose to retain the confidentiality of the attackers. The Tunku Mahkota issued a press statement to urge the culprits to apologise to the affected guests.

The following June, press reports leaked that Tunku Ibrahim had chalked RM26,700 worth of unpaid traffic fines since 2000, causing much embarrassment to the crown prince. A later report quoted him settling all the past fines with the traffic police.

Tunku Ibrahim also spent lavishly on an unusual car plate numbers. For example, in May 2012, he spent RM520,000 in a successful bid for the car number plate WWW 1 for his red orange Satria Neo. In January 2014, he spent a record breaking RM748,000 on the car plate number W1N for his blue Suprima S. In July 2016, he also spent a record breaking RM836,660 on the car plate number F1 for his ruby red Proton Perdana. He continued to break records by securing the FF1 number plate for RM1.2 million and GOLD1 number plate for RM1.5 million.

== Other activities ==
=== Business ===
Although given a monthly allowance of RM27,000, Sultan Ibrahim had done some business dealings such as

- Investment in Redtone (20% equity)
- Investment in MOL AccessPortal (15% equity)
- Investment in RedTone International (20% equity)
- Investment in 7Eleven Malaysia (8.5% equity)
- Investment in Berjaya Assets
- Investment in Umobile (15% equity)
- Investment in Berjaya Time Square (20% equity)
- Sold 116 acres of prime seafront land in Johor Bahru (previously State land which functioned as the customs clearance area for large goods vehicles at the border adjacent to the Johor–Singapore Causeway, then subsequently converted to sultanate land with the approval of the State Executive) along with adjacent coastal reclamation rights, to Guangzhou R&F for MYR 4.5 billion
- Benalec Holdings reclamation sites in Pengarang
- Tanjung Piai for petroleum facilities and a maritime industrial park
- Country Garden's reclamation of 4 islands off Tanjung Kupang for the Forest City megaproject (expected size of 3,425 acres, adjacent to the Malaysia–Singapore Second Link), of which Sultan Ibrahim has 64.4% equity in Esplanade Danga 88 Sdn Bhd, which in turn has 34% equity in the joint-venture company Country Garden Pacific View (CGPV) Sdn Bhd.

Ibrahim Iskandar, has defended his involvement in various businesses, including property development and a power plant project, explaining that he could not rely solely on his RM27,000 monthly allowance. In an interview with The Star, Sultan Ibrahim emphasized the long-standing tradition of the Johor royal family engaging in business ventures, which began in the 19th century with gambier and black pepper trading. He asserted that it is legitimate for royalty to be involved in business and that he has been transparent about his ventures, stating, "I must earn a living, like ordinary Malaysians." The palace emphasized that the Johor sultans have historically donated their entire state government allocations to benefit the people of Johor.

=== Sports ===
Sultan Ibrahim has keen interest in sports, especially polo, which has led him to participate in various tournaments up to the international level. He is also interested in tennis, water surfing, shooting, driving sports cars, and parachuting.

A motorcycle enthusiast, Sultan Ibrahim is the founder of the annual motorcycling tour event Kembara Mahkota Johor.

== Titles and styles ==
Styles of Sultan Ibrahim
- Reference style: His Majesty
- Spoken style: Your Majesty
- Alternative style: Tuanku

As a Sultan of Johor, Sultan Ibrahim's full title and style in Malay: Duli Yang Maha Mulia Sultan Ibrahim Ibni Almarhum Sultan Iskandar, D.K. (Johor), D.K. (Perak), D.K. (Kelantan), D.K. (Perlis), D.K. (Selangor), D.K. (Negeri Sembilan), D.K. (Terengganu), D.K.M.B. (Brunei), S.P.M.J, S.S.I.J, S.P.M.T, S.M.N, S.P.M.K, S.P.M.P, P.I.S, Sultan Yang Dipertuan Bagi Negeri dan Jajahan Takluk Johor Darul Ta’zim.

while in English: His Majesty Sultan Ibrahim Ibni Almarhum Sultan Iskandar, D.K. (Johor), D.K. (Perak), D.K. (Kelantan), D.K. (Perlis), D.K. (Selangor), D.K. (Negeri Sembilan), D.K. (Terengganu), D.K.M.B. (Brunei), S.P.M.J, S.S.I.J, S.P.M.T, S.M.N, S.P.M.K, S.P.M.P, P.I.S, The Sultan and Sovereign Ruler of the State of Johor, The Abode of Dignity and its dependencies.

During his tenure as Yang di-Pertuan Agong (2024–present), Sultan Ibrahim's full title and style in Malay is: Kebawah Duli Yang Maha Mulia Seri Paduka Baginda Yang di-Pertuan Agong Sultan Ibrahim while in English: His Majesty Sultan Ibrahim, King of Malaysia or simply His Majesty The King of Malaysia.

== Issue ==
Name	Birth	Marriage		Children	Ref
Name	Birth	Date	Spouse	Children	Ref
Tunku Ismail Idris	30 June 1984 (age 42)	24 October 2014	Khaleeda Bustamam	4, including Tunku Iskandar Abdul Jalil Abu Bakar Ibrahim	
Tunku Tun Aminah Maimunah Iskandariah	8 April 1986 (age 40)	14 August 2017	Dennis Muhammad Abdullah	2, including Layla Sofiah	
Tunku Idris Iskandar	25 December 1987 (age 38)				
Tunku Abdul Jalil	5 July 1990 – 5 December 2015 (aged 25)				
Tunku Abdul Rahman Hassanal Jefri	5 February 1993 (age 33)				
Tunku Abu Bakar	30 May 2001 (age 25)				

== Honours ==
=== Johor honours ===
- Grand Master and First Class (DK I) of the Royal Family Order of Johor
- Grand Master and First Class of the Order of the Crown of Johor (SPMJ) – Dato' (28 October 1980)
- Grand Master and Knight Grand Commander of the Order of the Loyalty of Sultan Ismail (SSIJ) – Dato' (8 April 1990)
- Founding Grand Master and Grand Knight of the Order of Sultan Ibrahim of Johor (SMIJ) – Dato' (since 30 March 2015)
- First Class of the Sultan Ibrahim Medal (PIS I)
- First Class of the Sultan Ibrahim of Johor Medal (PSI I) (30 March 2015)
- Sultan Ismail Coronation Medal (10 February 1960)
- Sultan Iskandar Coronation Medal (11 May 1981)
- First Class of Gold Medal of the Sultan Ibrahim Coronation Medal (23 March 2015)

=== Honours of Malaysia ===
- Malaysia
  - Recipient and Grand Master (since 31 January 2024) of the Order of the Royal Family of Malaysia (5 June 2024)
  - Recipient and Grand Master (since 31 January 2024) of the Order of the Crown of the Realm (DMN) (2 March 2015)
  - Grand Commander and Grand Master (since 31 January 2024) of the Order of the Defender of the Realm (SMN) – Tun (1987)
  - Grand Master of the Order of Loyalty to the Crown of Malaysia (since 31 January 2024)
  - Grand Master of the Order of Merit (since 31 January 2024)
  - Grand Master of the Order of Meritorious Service (since 31 January 2024)
  - Grand Master of the Order of Loyalty to the Royal Family of Malaysia (since 31 January 2024)
  - Recipient of the 17th Yang di-Pertuan Agong Installation Medal (20 July 2024)
  - Recipient of the 14th Yang di-Pertuan Agong Installation Medal (11 April 2012)
  - Recipient of the 13th Yang di-Pertuan Agong Installation Medal (26 April 2007)
  - Recipient of the 12th Yang di-Pertuan Agong Installation Medal (25 April 2002)
  - Recipient of the 11th Yang di-Pertuan Agong Installation Medal (23 September 1999)
  - Recipient of the 10th Yang di-Pertuan Agong Installation Medal (22 September 1994)
  - Recipient of the 8th Yang di-Pertuan Agong Installation Medal (15 November 1984)
- Kedah
  - Royal Family Order of Kedah (DK) (25 February 2018)
- Kelantan
  - Recipient of the Royal Family Order of Kelantan (DK) (2010)
  - Knight Grand Commander of the Order of the Crown of Kelantan (SPMK) – Dato' (1994)
- Negeri Sembilan
  - Member of the Royal Family Order of Negeri Sembilan (DKNS) (14 February 2011)
- Pahang
  - Member 1st class of the Family Order of the Crown of Indra of Pahang (DK I) (8 December 2023)
  - Member 2nd class of the Family Order of the Crown of Indra of Pahang (DK II) (24 October 1997)
- Perak
  - Recipient of the Royal Family Order of Perak (DK) (19 April 2010)
- Perlis
  - Recipient of the Perlis Family Order of the Gallant Prince Syed Putra Jamalullail (DK) (17 May 2010)
  - Knight Grand Commander of Order of the Crown of Perlis (SPMP) – Dato' Seri
- Sabah
  - Grand Commander of the Order of Kinabalu (SPDK) – Datuk Seri Panglima
- Sarawak
  - Knight Grand Commander of the Order of the Star of Hornbill Sarawak (DP) – Datuk Patinggi (2009)
- Selangor
  - First Class of the Royal Family Order of Selangor (DK I) (11 December 2010)
- Terengganu
  - Member first class of the Family Order of Terengganu (DK I) (26 April 2013)
  - Knight Grand Commander of the Order of the Crown of Terengganu (SPMT) – Dato' (6 April 1986)

=== Foreign honours ===
- Bahrain
  - Order of Sheikh Isa bin Salman Al Khalifa (Wisam al-Shaikh ‘Isa bin Salman Al Khalifa), First Class (2017)
- Brunei
  - Recipient of the Royal Family Order of the Crown of Brunei (DKMB) – (2014)
  - Sultan of Brunei Golden Jubilee Medal – (2017)
- Jordan
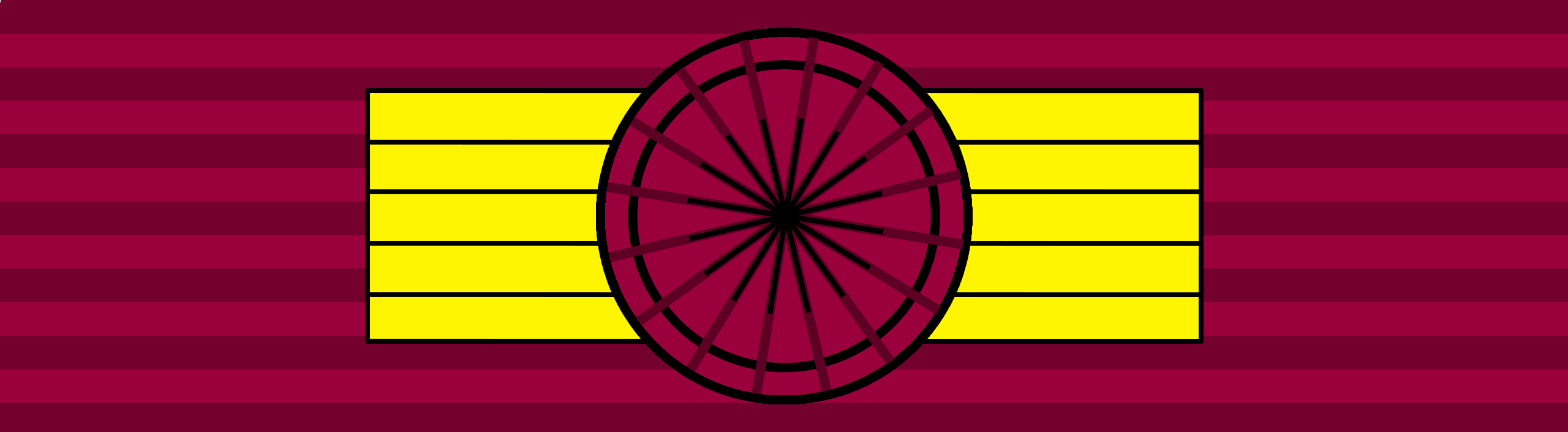
  - Grand Cordon with Collar of the Order of Al-Hussein bin Ali (12 October 2026)
- Philippines
  - Grand Cross (GCrS) (Datu) of the Order of Sikatuna (2019)

=== Honorary doctorate ===
- Singapore
  - Honorary degree Doctor of Laws from the National University of Singapore (NUS) – (20 July 2022)
- Malaysia
  - Honorary degree Doctor of Philosophy in Mechanical Engineering Technology from the Universiti Tun Hussein Onn Malaysia (UTHM) – (2 December 2023)

== See also ==
- King of Malaysia
- Sultan of Johor
- Monarchies of Malaysia
- List of crimes committed by members of the Johor royal family

== Bibliography ==
- Ali, Abdullah, Malaysian Protocol and Correct Forms of Address, published by Times Books International, 1986, ISBN 9971-65-370-2
- Cheong, Mei Sui, Information Malaysia: 1985 Year Book, published by Berita Publishing, 1985
- De Ledesma, Charles; Lewis, Mark; Savage, Pauline, Malaysia, Singapore and Brunei, published by Rough Guides, 2003, ISBN 1-84353-094-5
- Karim, Gulrose; Tate, Desmond Muzaffar, Information Malaysia, published by Berita Publ. Sdn. Bhd., 1989
- Kershaw, Roger, Monarchy in South-East Asia: The Faces of Tradition in Transition, published by Routledge, 2001, ISBN 0-415-18531-9
- Morais, J. Victor, ed. (1967) [first edition published in 1956]. The Who's who in Malaysia (6 ed.).
- Morris, Ira J., My East was Gorgeous, by Ira J. Morris, published by Travel Book Club, 1958
- Nadarajah, K. N, Tengku Ahmad Rithauddeen: His Story, Pelanduk Publications, 2000, ISBN 967-978-709-5
- Nadarajah, Nesalamar, Johore and the Origins of British Control, 1895–1914, published by Arenabuku, 2000, ISBN 967-970-318-5
- Rahman, Abdul; Solomon, J. S., Challenging Times, published by Pelanduk Publications, 1985, ISBN 967-978-094-5
- The International Who's Who 2004: Book with Single-User Online Access, by Elizabeth Sleeman, published by Europa Publications, Published by Routledge, 2003, ISBN 1-85743-217-7
- Towards Relevant Education: A General Sourcebook for Teachers, published by Education Forum (Philippines), Alternative Instructional Materials Project, Education Forum, 1986, ISBN 971-91006-0-5

Ibrahim Iskandar of Johor Johor Royal Family Born: 1958
Regnal titles
Preceded by Iskandar	Sultan of Johor; 2010–present	Incumbent; Heir apparent: Tunku Ismail Idris
Preceded by Abdullah of Pahang	Yang di-Pertuan Agong; 2024–present	Incumbent
