= Mahkota =

Mahkota is the Malay word for "crown" and may refer to:

- "Allah Selamatkan Sultan Mahkota", the state anthem of Kedah, Malaysia
- Bandar Indera Mahkota, township in Kuantan, Pahang, Malaysia
  - Indera Mahkota (federal constituency), federal constituency in Kuantan District, Pahang, Malaysia
- Bandar Mahkota Cheras, township in Cheras, Selangor, Malaysia
- Kembara Mahkota Johor, annual royal motorcycle tour program held by the state government of Johor
- Mahkota (state constituency), constituency in the Johor State Legislative Assembly
- Putra Mahkota Interchange, major interchange of the North-South Expressway Southern Route in Malaysia
- Teluk Mahkota, prominent bay on the east coast of the state of Johor, in Peninsular Malaysia
- Tunku Abdul Rahman (Tunku Mahkota of Johor) (1933–1989), the younger son of Sultan Ismail of Johor, Malaysia
