= Lee Chong Wei =

Malaysian badminton player (born 1982)

Yang Berbahagia Dato' Seri Lee Chong Wei 李宗伟 DB DGPN DCSM PJN DSPN AMN JP OLY
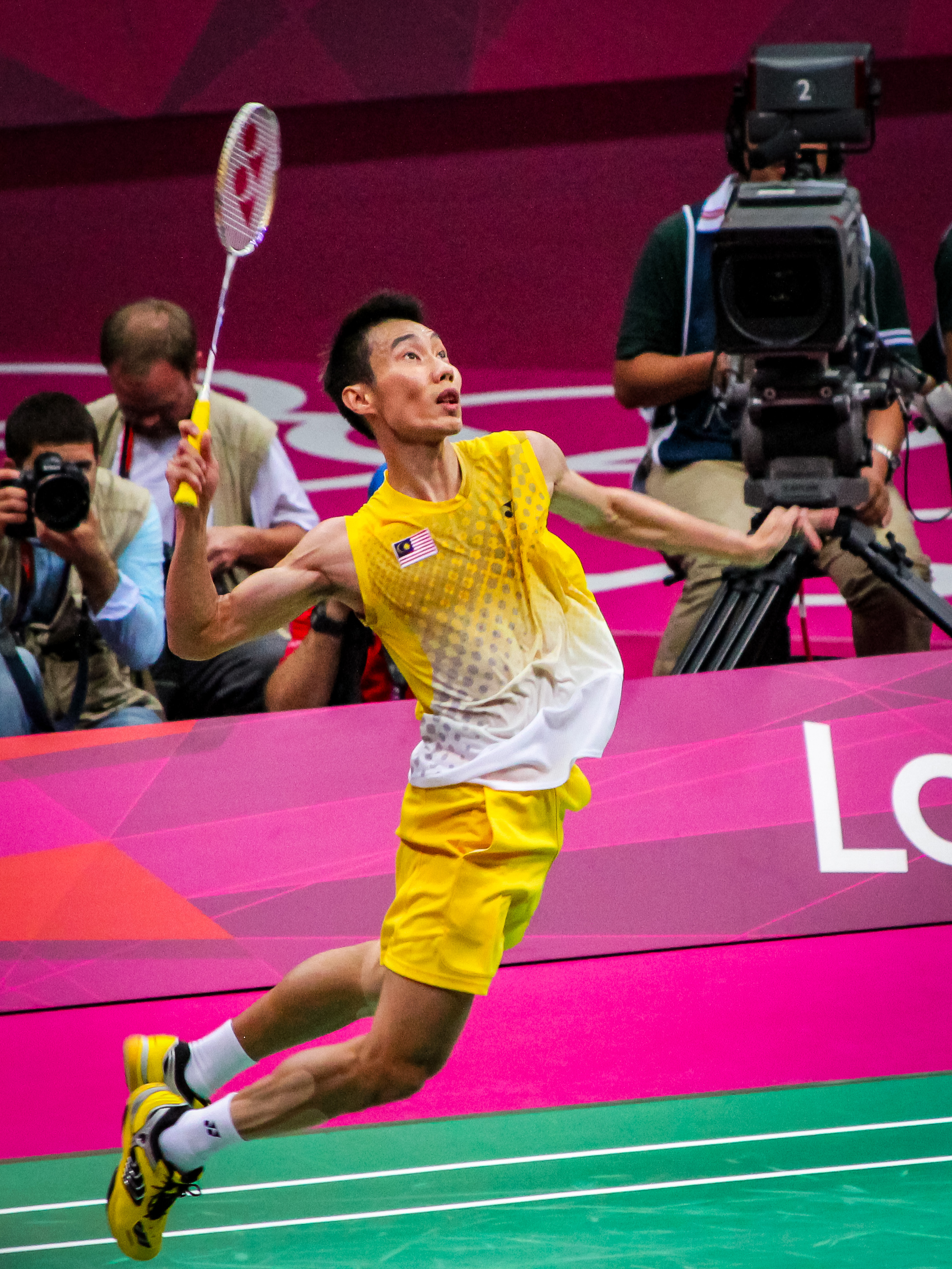
- Lee Chong Wei at the 2012 Olympics

Personal information
- Born: Lee Chong Wei; 21 October 1982 (age 44) Bagan Serai, Perak, Malaysia
- Years active: 2000–2019
- Height: 1.72 m (5 ft 7 1/2 in)
- Weight: 68 kg (150 lb; 10.7 st)
- Spouse: Wong Mew Choo (m. 2012)

Sport
- Country: Malaysia
- Sport: Badminton
- Handedness: Right
- Retired: 13 June 2019

Men's singles
- Career record: 711 wins, 134 losses
- Career title: 69
- Highest ranking: 1 (29 June 2006)
- BWF profile
Medal record
Men's badminton
Representing Malaysia
Olympic Games
Silver medal – second place	2008 Beijing	Men's singles
Silver medal – second place	2012 London	Men's singles
Silver medal – second place	2016 Rio de Janeiro	Men's singles
World Championships
Silver medal – second place	2011 London	Men's singles
Silver medal – second place	2013 Guangzhou	Men's singles
Silver medal – second place	2015 Jakarta	Men's singles
Bronze medal – third place	2005 Anaheim	Men's singles
Sudirman Cup
Bronze medal – third place	2009 Guangzhou	Mixed team
Thomas Cup
Silver medal – second place	2014 New Delhi	Men's team
Bronze medal – third place	2006 Sendai/Tokyo	Men's team
Bronze medal – third place	2008 Jakarta	Men's team
Bronze medal – third place	2010 Kuala Lumpur	Men's team
Bronze medal – third place	2016 Kunshan	Men's team
Commonwealth Games
Gold medal – first place	2006 Melbourne	Men's singles
Gold medal – first place	2006 Melbourne	Mixed team
Gold medal – first place	2010 Delhi	Men's singles
Gold medal – first place	2010 Delhi	Mixed team
Gold medal – first place	2018 Gold Coast	Men's singles
Silver medal – second place	2018 Gold Coast	Mixed team
Asian Games
Silver medal – second place	2010 Guangzhou	Men's singles
Bronze medal – third place	2006 Doha	Men's singles
Bronze medal – third place	2006 Doha	Men's team
Bronze medal – third place	2014 Incheon	Men's singles
Bronze medal – third place	2014 Incheon	Men's team
Asian Championships
Gold medal – first place	2006 Johor Bahru	Men's singles
Gold medal – first place	2016 Wuhan	Men's singles
Bronze medal – third place	2017 Wuhan	Men's singles
Bronze medal – third place	2018 Wuhan	Men's singles
Asia Team Championships
Bronze medal – third place	2018 Alor Setar	Men's team
SEA Games
Gold medal – first place	2005 Manila	Men's team
Bronze medal – third place	2003 Ho Chi Minh	Men's team
Bronze medal – third place	2005 Manila	Men's singles
Bronze medal – third place	2015 Singapore	Men's team
World Junior Championships
Bronze medal – third place	2000 Guangzhou	Boys' singles
Asian Junior Championships
Bronze medal – third place	2000 Kyoto	Boys' team

- Updated on 21 November 2024

Lee Chong Wei
- Simplified Chinese: 李宗伟
- Traditional Chinese: 李宗偉
Transcriptions
Standard Mandarin
- Hanyu Pinyin: Lǐ Zōngwěi
Southern Min
- Tâi-lô: Lí Tsong-uí

Lee Chong Wei (Chinese: 李宗伟; pinyin: Lǐ Zōngwěi; Pe̍h-ōe-jī: Lí Chong-úi; born 21 October 1982) is a Malaysian former professional badminton player. As a singles player, Lee was ranked first worldwide for a record of 349 weeks, including a 199-week streak from 21 August 2008 to 14 June 2012. He is the fifth Malaysian player after Foo Kok Keong, Rashid Sidek, Roslin Hashim and Wong Choong Hann to achieve such a ranking (since official rankings were first kept in the 1980s), and is the only Malaysian shuttler who has held the number one ranking for more than a year. On 2 May 2023, Lee was inducted to BWF Badminton Hall of Fame. He is widely regarded as one of the greatest badminton players of all time.

Lee is a triple silver medalist at the Olympic Games, and the sixth Malaysian to win an Olympic medal. He won his first silver medal in 2008, also the first time a Malaysian had reached the finals in the men's singles event. This achievement earned him the title Datuk, and led to then Malaysian Prime Minister Najib Razak describing him as a national hero. He repeated the achievement twice more in 2012 and 2016, thus making him the most successful Malaysian Olympian in history.

On 13 June 2019, Lee announced his retirement after struggling to return to full fitness following a nose cancer diagnosis. He was appointed as Malaysia's chef de mission for the 2020 Summer Olympics, but skipped the event due to his health concerns. He retained his role, albeit serving it virtually.

== Early life ==
Lee was born in Bagan Serai, Perak, into a Malaysian Chinese family, to Lee Ah Chai and Khor Kim Choi. In his early years, he favoured basketball, however his mother soon banned him from the game due to the searing heat of the outdoor basketball court. Lee began to learn badminton at the age of 11, when his father, who liked to play the game, brought him to the badminton hall. He attracted the attention of local coach Teh Peng Huat, who asked Lee's father if he could take him as a student. After receiving his father's consent, Teh began to train Lee after school. Discovered by Misbun Sidek, he was drafted into the national squad in 2000 when he was 17 years old.

== Career ==
=== 2002–2007 ===
Lee picked up only one minor title during the 2002 and 2003 seasons. He reached his first final of a major tournament at the 2003 Malaysia Open where he was defeated by Chen Hong of China. Lee then secured two titles in 2004, the Malaysia Open and the Chinese Taipei Open. Lee gained a spot for the 2004 Olympic Games in Athens. In his first Olympic appearance, Lee defeated Ng Wei of Hong Kong in the first round. His journey ended in the second round when he was defeated by Chen Hong. Lee scored another two titles in 2005, his second Malaysia Open title and the Denmark Open. Lee won a bronze in his first appearance in the world meet, the 2005 World Championships after losing to eventual winner Taufik Hidayat in the semi-final.

Lee won three titles out of six finals in 2006. He was crowned as the winner of the Swiss Open, Asian Badminton Championships and his third Malaysia Open title. He also reached the final of the Chinese Taipei Open, Macau Open and Hong Kong Open. In the Malaysia Open, Lee fought back from 13 to 20 down in the rubber match and saved eight match points against Lin Dan, and finally won the game with a score of 23–21 to secure the title. Lee won Malaysia's two gold medals in the badminton event for 2006 Commonwealth Games, in both the men's singles and mixed team events. Lee reached the top spot twice in the Badminton World Federation's world rankings in 2006, and he participated in the World Championships as top seed. However, he was upset by Bao Chunlai of China in the quarter-final despite Lee winning at their previous meeting. The match was also marred by two controversial line calls that were not in favour of Lee.

During the 2007 season, Lee failed to reach the final of the Malaysia Open for the first time in five years. He also suffered an early exit in five competitions afterward. Later on that season he took the Indonesia Open crown, his first title since the 2006 Malaysia Open after reuniting with former coach Misbun Sidek from Li Mao. His performance at the second half of the year was solid, as he achieved three titles in the Philippines Open, the Japan Open, and the French Open. He also managed to reach the final of the China Open and Hong Kong Open, despite his knee injury haunting him on both occasions. Lee won all matches he played in the Sudirman Cup in June, despite Malaysia finishing just fifth in the tournament. Lee's low point of the year was in the World Championships, despite the tournament being held in front of his home crowd and his solid performance during the second half of the year, he was defeated in the third round by Indonesia's Sony Dwi Kuncoro. Lee criticised the chief coach, Yap Kim Hock for treating him indifferently and putting pressure on him before the world championships. While the chief of Badminton Association of Malaysia, Datuk Nadzmi Mohd Salleh encouraged Lee and the chief coach, Yap Kim Hock to improve their relationship.

=== 2008 ===
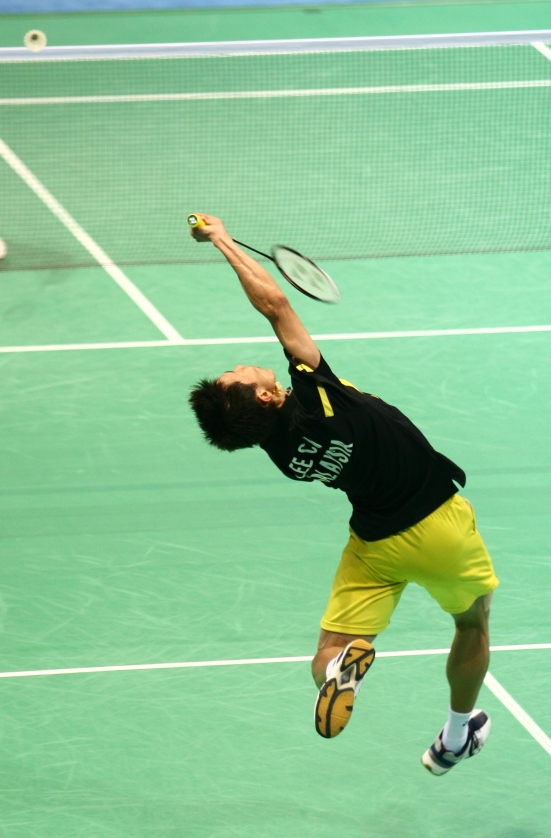
Lee playing in the semifinals of the 2008 Olympics

Lee kicked off 2008 with success, capturing his fourth Malaysia Open title in five years. However, Lee only captured one more other title that year, the Singapore Open, which was the final tournament in his pre-Olympic preparations. Other tournaments he took part in were the Korea Open; the All England Open; the Swiss Open; the Badminton Asia Championships; and Thomas Cup in Jakarta, Indonesia where Lee helped Malaysia advance to the semi-final. In the semi-final he defeated Lin Dan to give Malaysia a 1–0 lead in its clash with defending champion China, but Malaysia eventually lost 2–3 due to the defeat of its first doubles team in the vital final match.

In the 2008 Olympic Games, Lee was given a bye in the first round. He cruised to straight game victories over Ronald Susilo in the second round, Kęstutis Navickas in the third round, and Sony Dwi Kuncoro in the quarter-finals. In the semi-finals Lee Hyun-il gave him a tough fight, but eventually Lee was able to beat the South Korean and reach the final. However, it was a one-sided final, as Lee was completely outplayed by Lin Dan and salvaged only 20 points, losing 12–21, 8–21. He came second place overall.

Lee participated in several tournaments after the Olympic Games without capturing a title. He advanced to the finals of the Japan Open, the Macau Open and the China Open, but lost to Sony Dwi Kuncoro, Taufik Hidayat, and Lin Dan respectively. In the French Open Lee was eliminated in the semi-finals. His coach, Misbun Sidek, cited the pressure of being ranked world number one to explain Lee's recent failure to capture a title.

Lee ended his last Super Series tournament of the year, the Hong Kong Open, with a sudden withdrawal due to a knee injury, conceding a walkover to Germany's Marc Zwiebler. His last minute withdrawal led to the Chinese media tagging him as the "weakest world number one". The Chinese media speculated that three factors had hampered Lee's performance since the Olympic Games: the stress of the Olympic final, a phobia of Lin Dan due to his lopsided Olympic defeat at Lin's hands, and (echoing Misbun Sidek's conjecture) the pressure of being the world number one.

Despite Lee's difficulties in international play, he recorded his seventh consecutive victory at the National Badminton Grand Prix Final in Kedah on 12 December 2008, thus breaking the record of six consecutive titles set by Misbun Sidek. Lee ended the year with a title in the Super Series Masters Finals. However, Lin Dan and China's other top players did not compete, their association citing injuries and fatigue.

=== 2009 ===
Lee Chong Wei started the 2009 season with his fifth Malaysia Open title. He failed to secure his first Korea Open and All England Open title despite marching into the final. However, he secured his second title of the year in the Swiss Open which was held in Basel, defeating Lin Dan in straight sets and marking his first win in the finals against the Chinese opponent outside home turf.

Next, Lee was defeated by Chen Long of China in the Indian Open. Lee claimed he lost because of food poisoning even though he tried to be careful with the food. He called on the authorities in India to improve the conditions before the players returned for World Championships, adding "I will not be surprised if some of the players chose not to go" to the championship. In May, Lee helped Malaysia reach the semi-finals of the Sudirman Cup, the first in national history, despite his unbeaten record in the tournament being blown out by Lin Dan. He won another two titles in June, the Indonesia Open and the Malaysia Open Grand Prix Gold, despite failing to defend his Singapore Open title when he was taken by Nguyễn Tiến Minh in the second round.

Lee kicked off the second half of the season with defeat by Sony Dwi Kuncoro in the world meets, but went on to win the Macau Open in August. He reached the semi-final in the China Masters, but once again failed to beat his all time rival Lin Dan. Then, Lee participated in the Japan Open. He only managed to reach the second round of the Open, before winning the Hong Kong Open in November. His inconsistency saw him tumble down in the first round of the China Open. In December, Lee defended his Super Series Masters Finals title, which saw the competition played without the top badminton players in the world.

=== 2010 ===
Lee started the year with the title in all events he took part, his first treble in the Super Series titles. He gained his first ever Korea Open crown, sixth Malaysia Open, and defeated Kenichi Tago to win the oldest and most prestigious badminton championship in the world, the All England Open, his first since he took part in 2004.

Lee participated in the Thomas Cup in his home ground. He managed to defeat Kenichi Tago and take the first point, despite Malaysia's eventual loss (2–3) to Japan. In the quarter-finals, he beat Peter Gade, thus helping to secure Malaysia's place in the semi-finals. In the semi-finals against China, Lee was defeated by Lin Dan, which ended his 18-match unbeaten record since the start of the year.

In June, Lee participated in the Singapore Open losing in the quarter-finals. However, Lee bounced back winning the Indonesia Open, Malaysian Open Grand Prix Gold in July, and Macau Open in August. In late August, Lee suffered a shock exit in another attempt for the World Championships, but was beaten by Taufik Hidayat in the quarter-finals. Misbun cited that the loss was due to the back injury he picked up after the match against Rajiv Ouseph in the third round. On 26 September, Lee beat his archrival Lin Dan in the Japan Open, the only title not taken by Chinese players in the tournament.

In October, he helped Malaysia to beat India to defend the gold medal at the 2010 Commonwealth Games mixed team event, then he successfully defended his gold medal once again in the singles event a few days later. The following month he won a silver medal at the Asian Games. Despite beating reigning World Champion Chen Jin in the semi-final, Lee once again tasted defeat at the hands of his rival, Lin Dan, in the final. At season's end, he won his second consecutive Hong Kong Open title, and third consecutive Super Series Master Finals title, where the tournament was held in January 2011.

=== 2011 ===
In January, Lee won his seventh Malaysia Open title by defeating Taufik Hidayat from Indonesia in the final. However, he failed to defend the Korea Open title, the world's first ever million-dollar badminton tournament, after being beaten by Lin Dan from China in three games. In March, Lee cruised into the final of the All England Open for the third consecutive time and retained his title successfully with a convincing straight games victory over Lin Dan, and was praised by prime minister Najib Tun Razak.

On Labour Day, he won his first ever India Open, and also his third consecutive Malaysia Open Grand Prix Gold title a week later. Despite the fact that Lee won all the matches he played during the Sudirman Cup, Malaysia's journey ended in quarterfinals, after being beaten by South Korea 2–3. In late June, he won the Indonesia Open, becoming the first non-Indonesian player to complete the hat-trick in the tournament.

Lee's hopes of becoming the first Malaysian to win gold in the World Championships were dashed after defeat by Lin Dan in the final. Lee led for most of the match but lost two important match points in the rubber game. In September, Lee also failed to defend his Japan Open crown after losing to China's rising star Chen Long. In October, he lost to Chen Long again in his bid for his second Denmark Open title. He won the French Open a week later. This was followed by triple semi-finals exit in the Hong Kong Open, the China Open, and the Super Series Master Finals.

=== 2012 ===
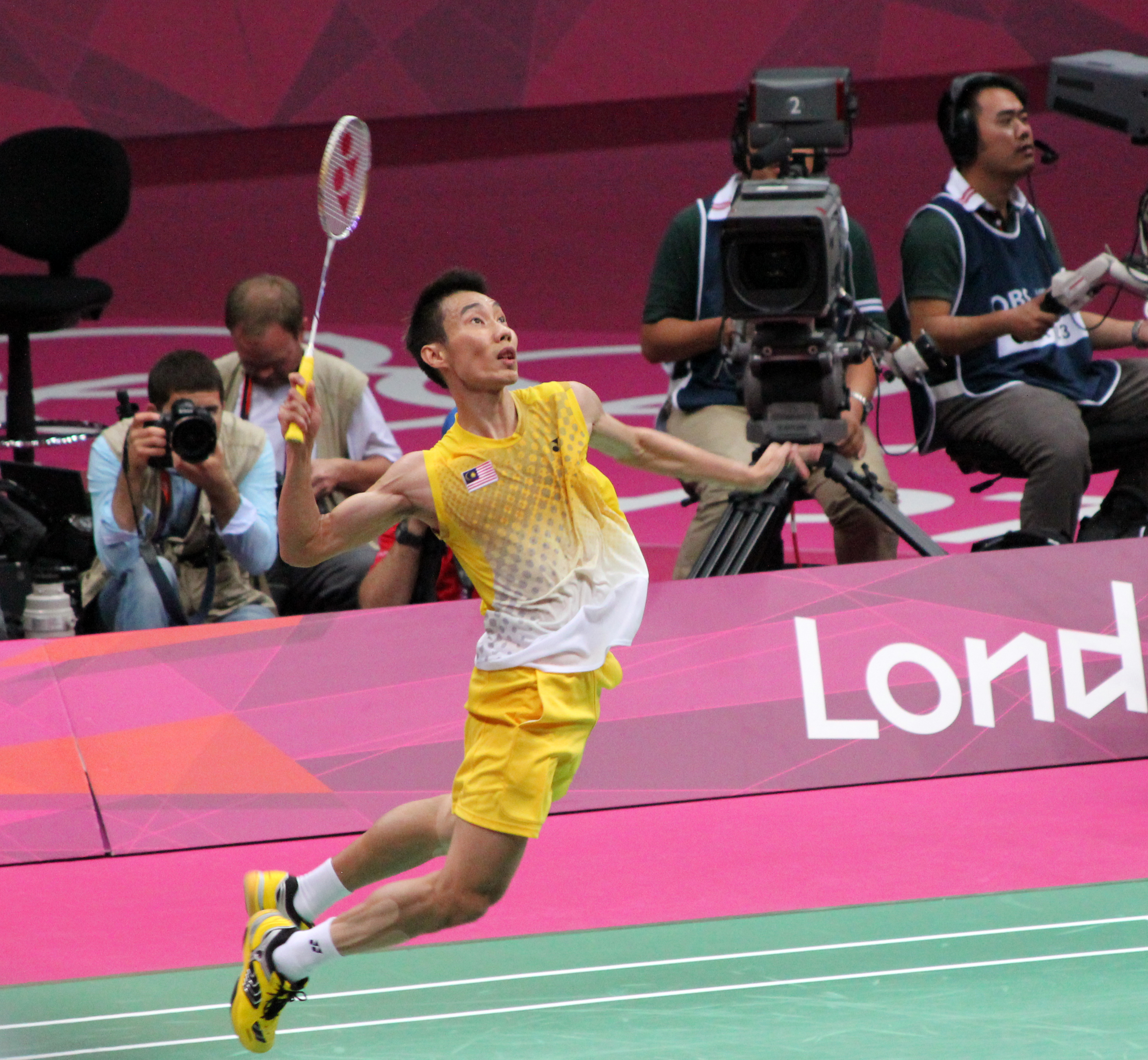
Lee playing in the semifinals of the 2012 Olympics

Lee started the Olympic year with the first Super Series tournament of the season, the Korea Open. In a repeat of the previous year's final, he avenged his loss to Lin Dan by defeating him in three sets. A week later, he captured his fifth straight and eighth Malaysia Open title, thus equalling the number of home titles held by Wong Peng Soon who won them between 1940 and 1953.

In March, Lee lost in the All England Open when he bowed out in the second game after receiving medical help on three occasions. This also dashed Lee's hopes of becoming the first man to win three successive All England Open titles. In April, he was defeated by South Korean Shon Wan-ho in the final of the India Open, but retained his Malaysia Open Grand Prix Gold title for the fourth time in a row in May. Lee was out for three to four weeks after suffering an ankle injury during the Thomas Cup Group C tie against Denmark.

Lee returned to the court for the first time after recovering from his injury to play in the London Olympic Games. He closely beat Ville Lång of Finland in rubber games for the first round, and blamed pressure for the close defeat. In the second round, he eased to a victory against Indonesia's Simon Santoso, before beating Kashyap Parupalli of India in the quarter-finals. In the semi-finals, he beat Chen Long of China in straight sets despite early predictions that Chen would be difficult to beat, and set up a repeat of 2008's final against Lin Dan. This was the second meeting in the Wembley Arena for both players after the 2011 World Championships. Lee led the match after winning the first game but Lin brought it to the rubber games. Despite leading for most of the time in the third game, Lin managed to level the point and edge him narrowly by 21–19, forcing Lee to settle for silver once more. BBC Sport analyst Gail Emms said, "You couldn't have asked for any more from Lee Chong Wei." This epic episode was documented in an academic article entitled "Silver lining in winning silver: an exploratory study of supporters’ reactions and coping on the social media towards Lee Chong Wei's London Olympics defeat".

He won the Japan Open and Denmark Open on his return since the London Olympic Games, but lost in the final of the Hong Kong Open, only a few days after his marriage. Lee ended the year with a loss in the opening match of the Super Series Master Finals and subsequently pulled out of tournament due to a thigh injury.

=== 2013 ===
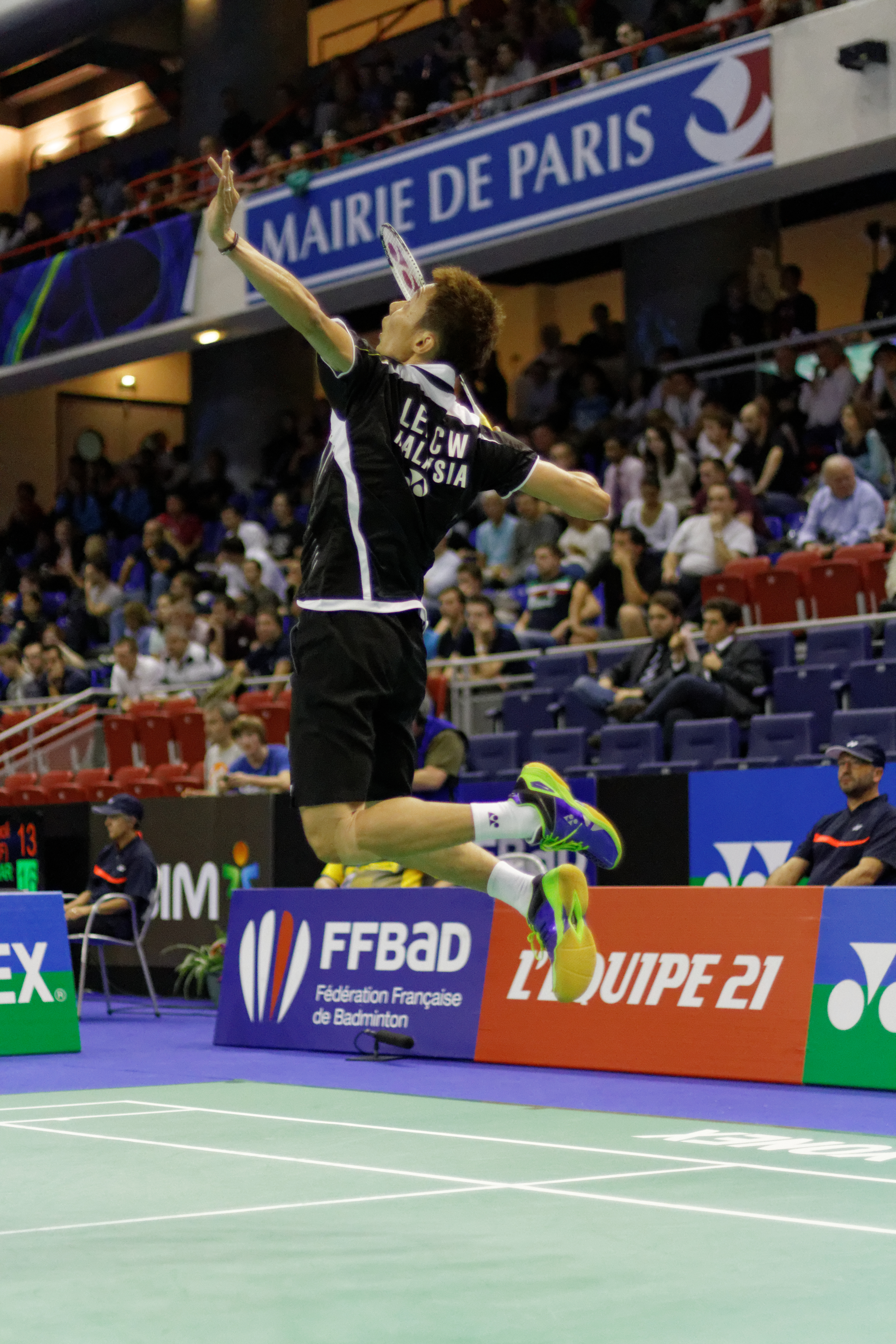
Lee playing in the quarterfinals of the 2013 French Super Series

Lee took the Korea Open title for the third time. A week later, he captured his ninth Malaysia Open title, which broke the record of eight titles previously held by Wong Peng Soon. Lee then lost in the final of the All England Open to Chen Long. Lee said he was disappointed with his performance during the tournament, despite marching into the final.

In April, he lost in the semi-finals of the Australia Open to the young Chinese player Tian Houwei. He then won his second India Open title and fifth Indonesia Open. In August, Lee marched into the final of the World Championships, but his hopes were once again dashed in a repeat of his 2011 final and 2010 Asian Games defeats against Lin Dan. He suffered leg cramps late into the third game. After attempting to continue, he had to retire and was subsequently stretchered to hospital.

After the World Championships Lee participated in four Super Series tournaments. First, he took the Japan Open title for the fourth time. Then he lost in the final of the Denmark Open and semifinal of the French Open, and triumphed again in the Hong Kong Open.

Lee won a record fourth Masters Finals title, the season ending Super Series tournament.

=== 2014 ===
In January, Lee lost in the final of Korea Open to Chen Long, his fourth straight defeat by the Chinese. He recorded his tenth Malaysia Open title a week later. Soon after the triumph, he announced it would be his last Malaysia Open outing, as he would assess his condition after the Asian Games and might retire if the results were not good.

However, his form improved and he won his third All England Open and India Open titles, although he was beaten by Simon Santoso in final of the Singapore Open. In the Thomas Cup, Lee won every match he played. Malaysia reached the finals, but lost to Japan with a score of 3–2.

In June, he won the Japan Open for the third consecutive year and fifth time overall. He then lost in the semifinals of the Indonesia Open, ending his hopes of nine straight Super Series finals. Due to a serious hamstring injury, Lee withdrew from the 2014 Commonwealth Games in July, also ending his hopes of being the first men's singles shuttler to win 3 back-to-back gold medals at the games.

Lee resumed play in August where he finished second for the third time at the World Championships, losing to Chen Long of China in straight sets. He again lost to Chen in the semifinals of Asian Games team competition, and to Lin Dan in the semifinals of the singles event a few days later.

==== Doping ====
In October 2014, local media reported that the Badminton Association of Malaysia confirmed that one of the nation's top shuttlers tested positive for dexamethasone after urine samples were taken during the World Championships in late August. The identity of the shuttler was not revealed but was widely believed to be Lee Chong Wei. Dexamethasone is not a performance-enhancing drug but a commonly administered anti-inflammatory corticosteroid that is not illegal when used off-season for injury rehabilitation, but deemed illegal if discovered in an athlete's body during competition.

On 5 November 2014, Lee flew to Norway to witness the testing of his "B" sample at the Oslo University Hospital after the "A" sample had already tested positive in October. The results were announced on 8 November 2014 by a Malaysian sports official who confirmed that the "B" sample had tested positive as well. He declined to identify the player but confirmed to The Associated Press that it was Lee.

On 11 November 2014, the Badminton World Federation confirmed that Lee was temporarily suspended from competing due to an apparent anti-doping regulation violation. The hearing was held on 11 April 2015 in Amsterdam.

On 27 April 2015, it was announced that Lee had been handed a backdated eight-month ban for his anti-doping rule violation. The panel was convinced that Lee had no intent to cheat and allowed him to resume his career by 1 May 2015. Lee was stripped of his silver medal from the 2014 World Championships but allowed to keep his two bronze medals from the 2014 Asian Games.

=== 2015 ===
The Sudirman Cup was Lee's first tournament after serving an eight-month suspension for a doping violation. He went on to win all three matches he played in the tournament. He then took back to back titles by winning the US Open and Canada Open. Lee again had to settle for second place at the World Championships as he lost to Chen Long in the final.

After the World Championships, Lee endured three early-round exits. First, in the second round of the Japan Open, followed by the qualifying rounds of the Korea Open, and then in the second round of Denmark Open.

After three early-round losses, Lee bounced back to win the French Open, followed by his first ever China Open title, thus making him the first-ever men's singles shuttler to have won all Super Series titles. The following week, Lee won the Hong Kong Open. However Lee did not qualify for the Super Series Finals, ending the year with three back-to-back titles.

=== 2016 ===
In January, Lee won his fifth Malaysia Masters title. In March, Lee lost in the first round of All England Open, and also in the second round of the India Open. In April, Lee won his 11th Malaysia Open title, then followed by his second Badminton Asia Championships title. At the Thomas Cup in May, Malaysia lost to eventual winners Denmark in the semi-finals despite Lee winning all the matches he contested in the tournament. In June, Lee won his 6th and record-equaling Indonesia Open title, becoming the third shuttler and first non-Indonesian to win the title six times. He was set to play in the Australian Open, but withdrew due to a muscle injury.

On 5 August 2016, Lee led the Malaysia contingent during the opening ceremony of the Olympic Games. In the men's singles competition he made it to the final, defeating his longtime rival Lin Dan in the semifinals in a dominating performance. However, he was defeated by Chen Long in the final, his third successive defeat in the final of the Olympic Games.

In September, Lee won his sixth Japan Open title. Since then, Lee has failed to win any tournament he participated in: he was defeated in the third round of the Denmark Open, pulled out from the French Open due to a hamstring injury, and ended the year with a group stage exit in the Super Series Finals.

=== 2017 ===
He started 2017 season with his fourth win in All England Open. He nearly missed out on the tournament after tearing the medial collateral ligament during a training session at the new Academy Badminton Malaysia (ABM), this caused his feud with technical director Morten Frost, as Frost was not receptive to his complaint, asking for the slippery mats to be replaced. Lee lost to Lin Dan for two consecutive tournaments, the first in the final of Malaysia Open, and the second in semifinals of Badminton Asia Championships.

In May, Lee won all the matches he contested during the Sudirman Cup. A month after, he lost in the second round of Indonesia Open. In August, Lee was upset by Brice Leverdez in the first round of the World Championships, soon after, he apologises to Malaysians for his defeat in his Twitter account but received some touching reply from the fans.

In September, he lost in his 100th career final, the Japan Open. He was knocked off in the early rounds of next three Super Series tournament, second round of Denmark Open, first round of French Open, and quarter-finals of the China Open. He won the Hong Kong Open title, only his second title this year.

He ended the year with lost in the final of Super Series Finals.

=== 2018 ===
Lee won his fifth Commonwealth Games gold medal in April, and settled for silver in the mixed team event.

He failed to win any World Tour titles in first half of the year. He bowed out in the first round of Malaysia Masters, a tournament which he claimed he did not intend to participate in, third round of All England Open, and semi-finals of Badminton Asia Championships.

In the team event, Lee managed to win all his matches, in both the Badminton Asia Team Championships and Thomas Cup. Malaysia reached the semi-finals and quarter-finals in the respective events.

In July 2018, Lee extended his own record at the Malaysia Open, taking a 12th title in his 14th final, and reached the semi-finals of the Indonesia Open. A week before the World Championships, the Badminton Association of Malaysia (BAM) announced that Lee would not be able to take part in the championships and also the Asian Games as he has to undergo treatment for a respiratory-related disorder. His participation in these two tournaments was in doubt even before the announcement after media reported that he was absent from the training. He was diagnosed with early stage of nasopharynx cancer and received treatment in Taiwan.

== Retirement ==
On 13 June 2019, Lee announced his retirement after almost a year since he was diagnosed with nose cancer and failed to return to competition despite dropping several hints that he would make a return in early 2019. This ended his 19-year-long international badminton career. The retirement came under his doctor's advice to avoid high-intensity training to avoid a relapse of his cancer.

Members of the media and players alike paid tribute to him after the announcement. His career-long rival, Lin Dan, wrote on Sina Weibo that he now had to "head into battle alone, as he no longer has a companion anymore (独自上场没人陪我了)", and shared a song titled "Don't Cry, Friend" (朋友别哭).

== Personal life ==
Lee received RM 300,000 on 21 August 2008, as a reward for his silver medal effort in the 2008 Olympic Games. Also, he received RM 3,000 a month as a lifetime pension beginning in August 2008. He was appointed as the UNICEF Malaysia's National Ambassador in February 2009.

He was in a relationship with Wong Mew Choo, his teammate. In 2009, Lee and Wong announced they are no longer together during the 2009 World Championships in Hyderabad, India. However, Lee announced his reconciliation with Mew Choo after winning a silver medal in the 2012 Summer Olympics. They were married on 9 November 2012, and have three children, Kingston, Terrance and Anson who were born in April 2013, July 2015 and November 2022 respectively.

On 16 March 2011, Lee received Permodalan Nasional Berhad shares worth RM 100,000 from Najib Tun Razak soon after his triumph in the All England Open. He was appointed as KDU University College ambassador on 31 July 2011. Lee's autobiography Dare to be a Champion was officially published on 18 January 2012.

== Awards ==
Below is the list of awards won by Lee. Lee also won the lifetime athlete award in 2016.

Awards	Year	Total	Ref
Penang Sportsman Award	2005, 2007, 2008, 2009, 2010, 2011, 2012, 2016	8	
TYT Prime Award Trophy	2008, 2010, 2012, 2013, 2015, 2016	6	
BWF Player of the Year Award	2009, 2010, 2011, 2013, 2016	5	
National Sportsman Award	2005, 2008, 2011, 2012	4	
Olympian of the Year Award	2008, 2012, 2016	3	
Sportswriters Association of Malaysia (SAM) Award	2008	1	
Most Popular Icon on Television Award by RTM	2013	1	

== Honours ==
Lee was conferred Member of the Order of the Defender of the Realm (Ahli Mangku Negara) (AMN) effective 3 June 2006 in conjunction with the 12th Yang di-Pertuan Agong Syed Sirajuddin Syed Putra Jamalullail's 63rd birthday.

On 30 August 2008, Lee, aged 26 at that time was made Officer of the Order of the Defender of State (Darjah Setia Pangkuan Negeri) (DSPN), which carried the title "Dato'" by the Governor of Penang, Abdul Rahman Abbas, following his achievement at the 2008 Summer Olympics.

On 6 June 2009, Lee became the second of only two recipients to date of the Order of Merit (Darjah Bakti) (DB), receiving the honour from Mizan Zainal Abidin in conjunction with His Majesty the 13th Yang di-Pertuan Agong's official birthday.

On 5 July 2012, Lee was conferred the rank of Lieutenant Commander (Honorary) of the Royal Malaysian Navy Volunteer Reserve Unit. On 7 October 2016, Lee was promoted to the rank of Commander (Honorary) in recognition of his achievement at the 2016 Summer Olympics.

On 15 October 2016, Lee was conferred Knight Commander of the Exalted Order of Malacca (Darjah Cemerlang Seri Melaka) (DCSM), carrying the title of "Datuk Wira", from the 6th Governor of Malacca, Mohd Khalil Yaakob.

Lee was made Commander of the Order of Meritorious Service (Panglima Jasa Negara) (PJN) effective 9 September 2017, which carries the title "Datuk", by the 15th Yang di-Pertuan Agong Muhammad V in conjunction with His Majesty's official birthday.

On 1 October 2021, Lee was announced as one of 10 recipients to be made a Justice of the Peace (JP) in conjunction with the 68th-birthday of the 10th Governor of Sabah, Juhar Mahiruddin.

On 2 December 2021, Lee was conferred an honorary doctorate in sports science by Syed Sirajuddin Jamalullail, the 8th Raja of Perlis and chancellor of the Science University of Malaysia (Universiti Sains Malaysia, USM), in conjunction with the university's 58th convocation ceremony.

On 26 May 2023, Lee was inducted into the BWF's Hall of Fame along with long-time rival, Lin Dan at Kuala Lumpur.

- Commander of the Order of Meritorious Service (PJN) – Datuk (2017).
- Member of the Order of the Defender of the Realm (AMN) (2006).
- Grand Recipient of the Order of Merit (DB) (2009).
- Commander of the Order of the Defender of State (DGPN) – Dato' Seri (2025).
- Officer of the Order of the Defender of State (DSPN) – Dato' (2008).
- Knight Commander of the Exalted Order of Malacca (DCSM) – Datuk Wira (2016).
- Justice of Peace (JP) (2021).
- Royal Malaysian Navy
  - Lieutenant Commander (Honorary) (2012).
  - Commander (Honorary) (2016).
- Conferred the Honorary Doctorate in Sports Science from Universiti Sains Malaysia (USM) (2021).

== Achievements ==
=== Career finals (69 titles, 34 runners-up) ===
Year	Tournament	Opponent	Score	Result
2003	Malaysia Open	(China) Chen Hong	9–15, 5–15	(silver) Runner-up
2003	India Satellite	(Malaysia) Yeoh Kay Bin	5–15, 13–15	(silver) Runner-up
2003	Malaysia Satellite	(Malaysia) Kuan Beng Hong	15–7, 15–9	(gold) Winner
2004	Malaysia Open (1)	(South Korea) Park Sung-hwan	15–3, 15–12	(gold) Winner
2004	Singapore Open	(Denmark) Kenneth Jonassen	15–3, 15–17, 4–15	(silver) Runner-up
2004	Chinese Taipei Open	(Malaysia) Kuan Beng Hong	15–4, 15–10	(gold) Winner
2005	Malaysia Open (2)	(China) Lin Dan	17–15, 9–15, 15–9	(gold) Winner
2005	Denmark Open (1)	(Malaysia) Muhammad Hafiz Hashim	17–14, 15–8	(gold) Winner
2006	Swiss Open (1)	(China) Xia Xuanze	15–8, 15–0	(gold) Winner
2006	Commonwealth Games (1)	(Malaysia) Wong Choong Hann	21–13, 21–12	(gold) Winner
2006	Asian Championships (1)	(Thailand) Boonsak Ponsana	21–12, 21–16	(gold) Winner
2006	Malaysia Open (3)	(China) Lin Dan	21–18, 18–21, 23–21	(gold) Winner
2006	Chinese Taipei Open	(China) Lin Dan	18–21, 21–12, 11–21	(silver) Runner-up
2006	Macau Open	(China) Lin Dan	18–21, 21–18, 18–21	(silver) Runner-up
2006	Hong Kong Open	(China) Lin Dan	19–21, 21–8, 16–21	(silver) Runner-up
2007	Indonesia Open (1)	(China) Bao Chunlai	21–15, 21–16	(gold) Winner
2007	Philippines Open	(China) Chen Hong	21–9, 21–15	(gold) Winner
2007	Japan Open (1)	(Indonesia) Taufik Hidayat	22–20, 19–21, 21–19	(gold) Winner
2007	French Open (1)	(China) Bao Chunlai	21–11, 21–14	(gold) Winner
2007	China Open	(China) Bao Chunlai	12–21, 13–21	(silver) Runner-up
2007	Hong Kong Open	(China) Lin Dan	21–9, 15–21, 15–21	(silver) Runner-up
2008	Malaysia Open (4)	(South Korea) Lee Hyun-il	21–15, 11–21, 21–17	(gold) Winner
2008	Swiss Open	(China) Lin Dan	13–21, 18–21	(silver) Runner-up
2008	Singapore Open	(Indonesia) Simon Santoso	21–13, 21–5	(gold) Winner
2008	Olympic Games	(China) Lin Dan	12–21, 8–21	(silver) Runner-up
2008	Japan Open	(Indonesia) Sony Dwi Kuncoro	17–21, 11–21	(silver) Runner-up
2008	Macau Open	(Indonesia) Taufik Hidayat	19–21, 15–21	(silver) Runner-up
2008	China Open	(China) Lin Dan	18–21, 9–21	(silver) Runner-up
2008	Super Series Finals (1)	(Denmark) Peter Gade	21–8, 21–16	(gold) Winner
2009	Malaysia Open (5)	(South Korea) Park Sung-hwan	21–14, 21–13	(gold) Winner
2009	Korea Open	(Denmark) Peter Gade	18–21, 21–10, 17–21	(silver) Runner-up
2009	All England Open	(China) Lin Dan	19–21, 12–21	(silver) Runner-up
2009	Swiss Open (2)	(China) Lin Dan	21–16, 21–16	(gold) Winner
2009	Indonesia Open (2)	(Indonesia) Taufik Hidayat	21–9, 21–14	(gold) Winner
2009	Malaysia Grand Prix Gold (1)	(China) Chen Long	21–16, 21–9	(gold) Winner
2009	Macau Open (1)	(Malaysia) Wong Choong Hann	21–15, 21–19	(gold) Winner
2009	Hong Kong Open (1)	(Denmark) Peter Gade	21–13, 13–21, 21–16	(gold) Winner
2009	World Superseries Masters Finals (2)	(South Korea) Park Sung-hwan	21–17, 21–17	(gold) Winner
2010	Korea Open (1)	(Denmark) Peter Gade	21–12, 21–11	(gold) Winner
2010	Malaysia Open (6)	(Thailand) Boonsak Ponsana	21–13, 21–7	(gold) Winner
2010	All England Open (1)	(Japan) Kenichi Tago	21–19, 21–19	(gold) Winner
2010	Indonesia Open (3)	(Indonesia) Taufik Hidayat	21–19, 21–8	(gold) Winner
2010	Malaysia Grand Prix Gold (2)	(Malaysia) Wong Choong Hann	21–8, 14–21, 21–15	(gold) Winner
2010	Macau Open (2)	(South Korea) Lee Hyun-il	No match	(gold) Winner
2010	Japan Open (2)	(China) Lin Dan	22–20, 16–21, 21–17	(gold) Winner
2010	Commonwealth Games (2)	(England) Rajiv Ouseph	21–10, 21–8	(gold) Winner
2010	Asian Games	(China) Lin Dan	13–21, 21–15, 10–21	(silver) Runner-up
2010	Hong Kong Open (2)	(Indonesia) Taufik Hidayat	21–19, 21–9	(gold) Winner
2010	Super Series Finals (3)	(Denmark) Peter Gade	21–9, 21–14	(gold) Winner
2011	Malaysia Open (7)	(Indonesia) Taufik Hidayat	21–8, 21–17	(gold) Winner
2011	Korea Open	(China) Lin Dan	19–21, 21–14, 16–21	(silver) Runner-up
2011	All England Open (2)	(China) Lin Dan	21–17, 21–17	(gold) Winner
2011	India Open (1)	(Denmark) Peter Gade	21–12, 12–21, 21–15	(gold) Winner
2011	Malaysia Grand Prix Gold (3)	(China) Bao Chunlai	21–9, 21–19	(gold) Winner
2011	Indonesia Open (4)	(Denmark) Peter Gade	21–11, 21–7	(gold) Winner
2011	World Championships	(China) Lin Dan	22–20, 14–21, 21–23	(silver) Runner-up
2011	Japan Open	(China) Chen Long	8–21, 21–10, 19–21	(silver) Runner-up
2011	Denmark Open	(China) Chen Long	15–21, 18–21	(silver) Runner-up
2011	French Open (2)	(Japan) Kenichi Tago	21–16, 21–11	(gold) Winner
2012	Korea Open (2)	(China) Lin Dan	12–21, 21–18, 21–14	(gold) Winner
2012	Malaysia Open (8)	(Japan) Kenichi Tago	21–6, 21–13	(gold) Winner
2012	All England Open	(China) Lin Dan	19–21, 2–6^{r}	(silver) Runner-up
2012	India Open	(South Korea) Shon Wan-ho	18–21, 21–14, 19–21	(silver) Runner-up
2012	Malaysia Grand Prix Gold (4)	(Indonesia) Sony Dwi Kuncoro	17–21, 21–8, 21–10	(gold) Winner
2012	Olympic Games	(China) Lin Dan	21–15, 10–21, 19–21	(silver) Runner-up
2012	Japan Open (3)	(Thailand) Boonsak Ponsana	21–18, 21–18	(gold) Winner
2012	Denmark Open (2)	(China) Du Pengyu	15–21, 21–12, 21–19	(gold) Winner
2012	Hong Kong Open	(China) Chen Long	19–21, 17–21	(silver) Runner-up
2013	Korea Open (3)	(China) Du Pengyu	21–12, 21–15	(gold) Winner
2013	Malaysia Open (9)	(Indonesia) Sony Dwi Kuncoro	21–7, 21–8	(gold) Winner
2013	All England Open	(China) Chen Long	17–21, 18–21	(silver) Runner-up
2013	India Open (2)	(Japan) Kenichi Tago	21–15, 18–21, 21–17	(gold) Winner
2013	Indonesia Open (5)	(Germany) Marc Zwiebler	21–15, 21–14	(gold) Winner
2013	World Championships	(China) Lin Dan	21–16, 13–21, 17–20^{r}	(silver) Runner-up
2013	Japan Open (4)	(Japan) Kenichi Tago	23–21, 21–17	(gold) Winner
2013	Denmark Open	(China) Chen Long	22–24, 19–21	(silver) Runner-up
2013	Hong Kong Open (3)	(Indonesia) Sony Dwi Kuncoro	21–13, 21–9	(gold) Winner
2013	Super Series Finals (4)	(Indonesia) Tommy Sugiarto	21–10, 21–12	(gold) Winner
2014	Korea Open	(China) Chen Long	14–21, 15–21	(silver) Runner-up
2014	Malaysia Open (10)	(Indonesia) Tommy Sugiarto	21–19, 21–9	(gold) Winner
2014	All England Open (3)	(China) Chen Long	21–13, 21–18	(gold) Winner
2014	India Open (3)	(China) Chen Long	21–13, 21–17	(gold) Winner
2014	Singapore Open	(Indonesia) Simon Santoso	15–21, 10–21	(silver) Runner-up
2014	Japan Open (5)	(Hong Kong) Hu Yun	21–14, 21–12	(gold) Winner
2014	World Championships	(China) Chen Long	19–21, 19–21	DSQ (2)
2015	U.S. Open	(Denmark) Hans-Kristian Vittinghus	22–20, 21–12	(gold) Winner
2015	Canada Open	(Hong Kong) Ng Ka Long Angus	21–17, 21–13	(gold) Winner
2015	World Championships	(China) Chen Long	14–21, 17–21	(silver) Runner-up
2015	French Open (3)	(Chinese Taipei) Chou Tien-chen	21–13, 21–18	(gold) Winner
2015	China Open	(China) Chen Long	21–15, 21–11	(gold) Winner
2015	Hong Kong Open (4)	(China) Tian Houwei	21–16, 21–15	(gold) Winner
2016	Malaysia Masters (5)	(Malaysia) Iskandar Zulkarnain Zainuddin	21–18, 21–11	(gold) Winner
2016	Malaysia Open (11)	(China) Chen Long	21–13, 21–8	(gold) Winner
2016	Asian Championships (2)	(China) Chen Long	21–17, 15–21, 21–13	(gold) Winner
2016	Indonesia Open (6)	(Denmark) Jan Ø. Jørgensen	17–21, 21–19, 21–17	(gold) Winner
2016	Olympic Games	(China) Chen Long	18–21, 18–21	(silver) Runner-up
2016	Japan Open (6)	(Denmark) Jan Ø. Jørgensen	21–18, 15–21, 21–16	(gold) Winner
2017	All England Open (4)	(China) Shi Yuqi	21–12, 21–10	(gold) Winner
2017	Malaysia Open	(China) Lin Dan	19–21, 14–21	(silver) Runner-up
2017	Japan Open	(Denmark) Viktor Axelsen	14–21, 21–19, 14–21	(silver) Runner-up
2017	Hong Kong Open (5)	(China) Chen Long	21–14, 21–19	(gold) Winner
2017	Super Series Finals	(Denmark) Viktor Axelsen	21–19, 19–21, 15–21	(silver) Runner-up
2018	Commonwealth Games (3)	(India) Srikanth Kidambi	19–21, 21–14, 21–14	(gold) Winner
2018	Malaysia Open (12)	(Japan) Kento Momota	21–17, 23–21	(gold) Winner

BWF Super Series tournament
BWF Grand Prix Gold tournament
BWF Grand Prix tournament

== In popular culture ==
In December 2017, the first trailer for his biopic movie was released. Entitled Lee Chong Wei, the biopic premiered on 9 March 2018 at the Bukit Jalil National Stadium, Kuala Lumpur, and was released nationwide on 15 March 2018.

== See also ==
- Lee–Lin rivalry

Olympic Games
Preceded by Pandelela Rinong	Flagbearer for Malaysia; Rio de Janeiro 2016	Succeeded by Lee Zii Jia; Goh Liu Ying
