= Teh Peng Huat =

Malaysian badminton coach

- Traditional Chinese: 鄭炳發
- Simplified Chinese: 郑炳发
Transcriptions
Standard Mandarin
- Hanyu Pinyin: Zhèng Bǐngfā
Southern Min
- Hokkien POJ: Tēⁿ Péng Hoat

Teh Peng Huat (born c. 1937) is a Malaysian badminton coach based in Bukit Mertajam, Seberang Perai, Penang who coaches local youth players. He is best known for spotting Lee Chong Wei and bringing Lee under his tutelage in the early 1990s, and credited with quickly developing Lee into a national junior champion. He also developed many other kids into professional badminton players, including Goh Jin Wei, Chin Eei Hui, Cheam June Wei, Tee Jing Yi, Nelson Heg, and Cheah Yee See.

He received Penang's Best Coach award in 2004. The story of how he went out of his way to convince Lee Chong Wei's father to let him coach Chong Wei—including making a promise to waive Chong Wei's fees and offering to send Chong Wei home after every training session—has been reported by international media. In the 2018 biopic Lee Chong Wei, Teh is portrayed by actor Freddie Wong (王骏).
