= Lee Chong Wei (film) =

- official poster
- Traditional Chinese: 敗者為王
- Simplified Chinese: 败者为王
- Literal meaning: From Loser to King
- Hanyu Pinyin: Bài Zhě Wéi Wáng
- Directed by: Teng Bee
- Written by: Teng Bee; Luke Hwong; Tony Hu; Wong Siew Chooi
- Based on: Dare to Be a Champion by Lee Chong Wei
- Produced by: Josiah Chieng; Teng Bee
- Starring: Tosh Chan; Jake Eng; Mark Lee; Yeo Yann Yann; Rosyam Nor
- Cinematography: Eric Yeong
- Production companies: CB Pictures; Mahu Pictures
- Release dates: 9 March 2018 (Bukit Jalil); 15 March 2018 (Malaysia); 15 March 2018 (Singapore); 7 October 2018 (China); 28 October 2018 (Taiwan)
- Running time: 133 minutes
- Country: Malaysia
- Languages: Hokkien; Mandarin; Malay; English
- Budget: RM6 million
- Box office: RM4.75 million CN¥6.58 million NT$2 million

Lee Chong Wei is a 2018 Malaysian biographical sports drama film directed by Teng Bee, about the story of national icon Lee Chong Wei, who rose from poverty to become the top badminton player in the world. The film is based on Lee's 2012 autobiography Dare to Be a Champion (which has been translated into English by Patty Tai Peck Sing). The film stars two newcomers in the title role, namely 22-year-old Tosh Chan and 13-year-old Jake Eng, who were picked from among more than 2,000 auditioning hopefuls.

== Plot ==
The movie begins with a young boy asking Lee how to be as good of a shuttler as him after a badminton match. A flashback then brings Lee back to his tough upbringing and the story of how he overcame setbacks along the way. The film features a mix of real-life accounts and dramatic fiction, culminating in the 2006 Malaysia Open final where Lee miraculously saved 8 match points against his great rival Lin Dan of China to win the title, one of the few and first occasions where Lee defeated Lin in their numerous encounters over the span of their decade-long rivalry.

== Cast ==
- Tosh Chan as adult Lee Chong Wei
  - Jake Eng as young Lee Chong Wei
- Mark Lee as Lee Ah Chai, Lee Chong Wei's father and Khor Kim Chooi's husband
- Yeo Yann Yann as Khor Kim Chooi, Lee Chong Wei's mother and Lee Ah Chai's wife
- Rosyam Nor as Misbun Sidek, Lee Chong Wei's national team coach
- Ashley Hua as Wong Mew Choo, Lee Chong Wei's teammate and love interest, later wife
- Freddie Wong as Teh Peng Huat, Lee Chong Wei's junior coach
- Uriah See as Yang Kuan Cheng, Lee Chong Wei's rival
- Sherie Merlis as Latifah Sidek, Misbun Sidek's wife
- Bernard Hiew
- Norman Pang
- Wilson Tin
- Jacky Kam
- Agnes Lim as Lee Bee Kim, Lee Chong Wei's sister
- Ling Tai Yong as Lee Chong Wei's brother

== Production ==
The film was initially titled Rise Of The Legend and took three years to produce. In early 2017, an audition was held for the lead role of Lee with more than 2,000 candidates from Malaysia and Taiwan. 22-year-old Tosh Chan and child actor Jake Eng were selected to play the role of Lee and a young version of him.

== Reception ==
The film received generally average reviews, but earned RM2 million in ticket sales in the first 4 days of release. It peaked at number 3 in the Malaysian cinema charts upon release, and fell to number 4 the following week.

Although the movie was supposed to be released throughout Asia, it failed to make a splash in neighbouring Singapore, garnering only S$10,000 in ticket sales upon release and a total of under S$75,000 after a 4-day run. Nevertheless, it peaked at number 6 in Singapore and maintained in the weekly top 10 charts for 4 consecutive weeks.

However, the film performed strongly in other markets, having grossed ¥6.58 million in China where it was released on 7 September 2018. Following its release in Taiwan on 28 September 2018, it surpassed NT$1 million after just 3 days and eventually passed the $2 million mark.
