= Order of Merit (Malaysia) =

Malaysian merit order in arts, sciences and humanity

- Insignia of the Order of Merit

Awarded by the King of Malaysia
- Type: State Order
- Established: 26 June 1975
- Ribbon: Dark green with a double yellow central stripe and yellow edges.
- Eligibility: Malaysian citizens
- Awarded for: Significant contributions in art, science or humanity at an international level.
- Status: Currently constituted
- Sovereign: Sultan Ibrahim, King of Malaysia
- Grades: Grand Recipient (DB)
- Post-nominals: D.B.

Statistics
- First induction: 7 June 2008
- Last induction: 1 June 2026
- Total inductees: 3 Members

Precedence
- Next (higher): Order of Loyalty to the Crown of Malaysia
- Next (lower): Order of Meritorious Service
- Ribbon of the Order

The Order of Merit (Malay: Darjah Bakti) is a Malaysian federal award presented for those who have made significant contributions in art, science or humanity and are renowned at national and international level. This award was instituted on 26 June 1975.

== About the award ==
This order does not carry any title and is conferred on Malaysian citizens only. The recipients are those who have made significant contributions in art, science or humanity and are renowned at national and international level. This award is limited to ten living recipients only at any time and to date there have only been three recipients. It is worn around the neck.

The badge of the Order of Merit is round. On the surface is a white circle with the Malaysian Crest engraved in the centre and surmounted by the slogan "Bakti Untuk Negara" (English: Serve the Nation). The circle is enclosed by another circle and in between the two circles are five-pointed stars enclosed by a crescent moon. The badge suspends from a ribbon which has green and yellow stripes. The narrow stripes are yellow while the broader stripes are green.

== Recipients ==
Official source

=== Grand Recipient (DB) ===
- 2008: Nicol Ann David
- 2009: Lee Chong Wei
- 2026: Azizulhasni Awang
