= Installation of Yang di-Pertuan Agong XVII =

Installation of Malaysia's sovereign

- Native name: Istiadat Pertabalan Kebawah Duli Yang Maha Mulia Seri Paduka Baginda Yang di-Pertuan Agong XVII Sultan Ibrahim
- English name: Installation Ceremony of His Majesty Sultan Ibrahim, King of Malaysia XVII
- Date: Coronation: 31 January 2024; Installation ceremony: 20 July 2024
- Location: Istana Negara, Kuala Lumpur; 3°09′41″N 101°39′49″E
- Participants: Sultan Ibrahim, Yang di-Pertuan Agong; Raja Zarith Sofiah, Raja Permaisuri Agong; Azuan Affendy Zairakithnaini, the Grand Chamberlain; Anwar Ibrahim, Prime Minister; Munir Md Salleh, Istana Negara Islamic Affairs officer; Selected officers of Istana Negara

The installation of Sultan Ibrahim as the 17th Yang di-Pertuan Agong took place on 20 July 2024, a few months after Ibrahim ascended the throne on 31 January 2024 at Balairung Seri, Istana Negara, Kuala Lumpur. During the ceremony, the new Agong recited his Oath of Installation and gave his first speech from the Throne. Ibrahim was elected by the Malay Rulers in the 263rd Special Meeting of the Conference of Rulers, held at Istana Negara on 27 October 2023. The previous Agong, Al-Sultan Abdullah Ri'ayatuddin Al-Mustafa Billah Shah, ended his five-year reign on 30 January 2024.

== Background ==
The King of Malaysia serves as the constitutional monarch and head of state in Malaysia, a position established in 1957 upon the country's independence from the United Kingdom. This position is filled through an election process by the Conference of Rulers, consisting of nine kings from the Malay states. Malaysia stands out as one of the few nations with an elected monarch.

The term of service for the King is five years, and reappointment is not immediately allowed. The 16th King, Al-Sultan Abdullah Ri'ayatuddin Al-Mustafa Billah Shah, officially concluded his five-year reign on 30 January 2024.

Earlier on, a Special Meeting was held on 26 October 2023, by the Conference of Rulers to discuss the upcoming election of the next King. In this meeting, the Sultan of Johor, Sultan Ibrahim, was elected as the 17th King, succeeding Abdullah. His five-year term takes effect on 31 January 2024. The Sultan of Perak, Sultan Nazrin Muizzuddin Shah was elected as the Deputy King, with his term also commencing on the same date.

In contrast to monarchies in other nations, the King assumes office without a coronation ceremony. However, the commencement of the new king's reign is distinguished by two significant ceremonies: "Istiadat Melafaz dan Menandatangani Sumpah Jawatan" ('Ceremony of Swearing-in and Signing of the Oath of Office'), during which the new king takes the oath of office and is formally proclaimed, and "Istiadat Pertabalan" ('Installation Ceremony').

== Pre-installation ceremony ==
=== Ceremony of Swearing-in and Signing the Letter of the Oath of Office ===
The swearing-in ceremony and signing of the oath of office for the 17th King, Sultan Ibrahim, took place on 31 January 2024, marking the commencement of his five-year reign. The event unfolded with the departure of the new King from Istana Bukit Serene in Johor Bahru to attend the ceremony in Kuala Lumpur. The ceremonial proceedings commenced with Sultan Ibrahim's arrival at the Royal Malaysian Air Force (RMAF) Subang Air Base, followed by the royal entourage proceeding to Istana Negara.

Upon arriving at the palace, Sultan Ibrahim received a warm welcome with a military ceremony in the palace square - it was a departure from previous inaugurations as the first honors were usually presented in Parliament House. The Main Guard of Honor company from the 1st Battalion of the Royal Malay Regiment presented the King's first Royal Salute as a 21-gun salute was fired at the grounds, after which the King inspected the guard as the Central Band of the RMR played Menjunjung Duli. Subsequently, Sultan Ibrahim entered Istana Negara to participate in the 264th (Special) Meeting of the Conference of Rulers, held at the Balairung Seri of the palace.

During this special meeting, significant ceremonies, including the swearing-in and the Declaration of Holding Office as outlined in Article 37 of the Federal Constitution, took place. With the official declaration, Sultan Ibrahim officially ascended the throne and proclaimed as King, serving for five years effective from 31 January 2024 and thus he assumed also the residency of the Istana Negara. The ceremony also witnessed the Sultan of Perak, Sultan Nazrin Muizzuddin Shah, taking the oath of office as Deputy King for the same period.

The following is the text of the oath of office of the King that was read by Sultan Ibrahim:

In Malay:

Kami, Sultan Ibrahim ibni Almarhum Sultan Iskandar, Yang di-Pertuan Agong bagi Malaysia bersumpah dengan melafazkan: Wallahi, Wabillahi, Watallahi; maka dengan lafaz ini berikrarlah Kami dengan sesungguhnya dan dengan sebenarnya mengaku akan taat setia pada menjalankan dengan adilnya pemerintahan bagi Malaysia dengan mengikut sebagaimana undang-undang dan Perlembagaan yang telah disahkan dan dimasyurkan dan akan disah dan dimasyurkan di masa hadapan ini. Dan lagi Kami berikrar mengaku dengan sesungguh dan dengan sebenarnya memeliharakan pada setiap masa Agama Islam dan berdiri tetap di atas permintaan yang adil dan aman di dalam Negeri.

Translation in English:

We, Sultan Ibrahim ibni Almarhum Sultan Iskandar, King of Malaysia do hereby swear: Wallahi, Wabillahi, Watallahi, in the name, grace and mercy of God; and by virtue of that oath do solemnly and truly declare that: We shall justly and faithfully perform (carry out) our duties in the administration of Malaysia in accordance with its laws and Constitution which have been promulgated or which may be promulgated from time to time in the future. Further We do solemnly and truly declare that We shall at all time protect the Religion of Islam and uphold the rules of law and order in the Country.

In the presence of the Malay kings, royal relatives, and dignitaries, Sultan Ibrahim signed the Declaration of Holding Office letters. The contents of these letters were then read by Prime Minister Anwar Ibrahim:

In Malay:

Bahawasanya adalah diperuntukkan oleh Perkara 32 Perlembagaan Persekutuan bahawa hendaklah ada seorang Ketua Utama Negara bagi Persekutuan yang digelar Yang di-Pertuan Agong yang dipilih oleh Majlis Raja-raja.

Dan bahawasanya menurut peruntukan Jadual Ketiga kepada Perlembagaan Persekutuan, Majlis Raja-raja telah mengisytiharkan Beta dipilih memegang jawatan Yang di-Pertuan Agong.

Maka oleh yang demikian Beta, Sultan Ibrahim ibni Almarhum Sultan Iskandar dengan ini mengisytiharkan bahawa Beta pada hari ini telah memegang jawatan Yang di-Pertuan Agong dan telah mengangkat sumpah yang dikehendaki oleh Perkara 37 Perlembagaan Persekutuan mengikut cara yang ditetapkan oleh Perkara itu.

Diperbuat di Istana Beta, Istana Negara, di ibu negara Beta di Kuala Lumpur pada tiga puluh satu hari bulan Januari dalam tahun dua ribu dua puluh empat.

Translation in English:

Whereas, by virtue of Article 32 of the Federal Constitution, it is hereby declared that there shall be a Head of State for the Federation known as the King of Malaysia, who is elected by the Conference of Rulers.

And pursuant to the provisions outlined in the Third Schedule of the aformentioned Federal Constitution, the Conference of Rulers has proclaimed the election of myself to the esteemed position of King of Malaysia.

Therefore, I, Sultan Ibrahim ibni Almarhum Sultan Iskandar, do hereby declare that, as of today, I have assumed the office of King of Malaysia. I have taken the requisite oath, as mandated by Article 37 of the Federal Constitution, in accordance with the prescribed manner set by it.

Proclamation done in my Palace, the Istana Negara, situated in the capital of my country, Kuala Lumpur, on the thirty-first day of January in the year two thousand and twenty-four.

== See also ==
- Installation of the Yang di-Pertuan Agong
