= Proton Perdana =

Malaysian mid-sized sedan produced by Proton

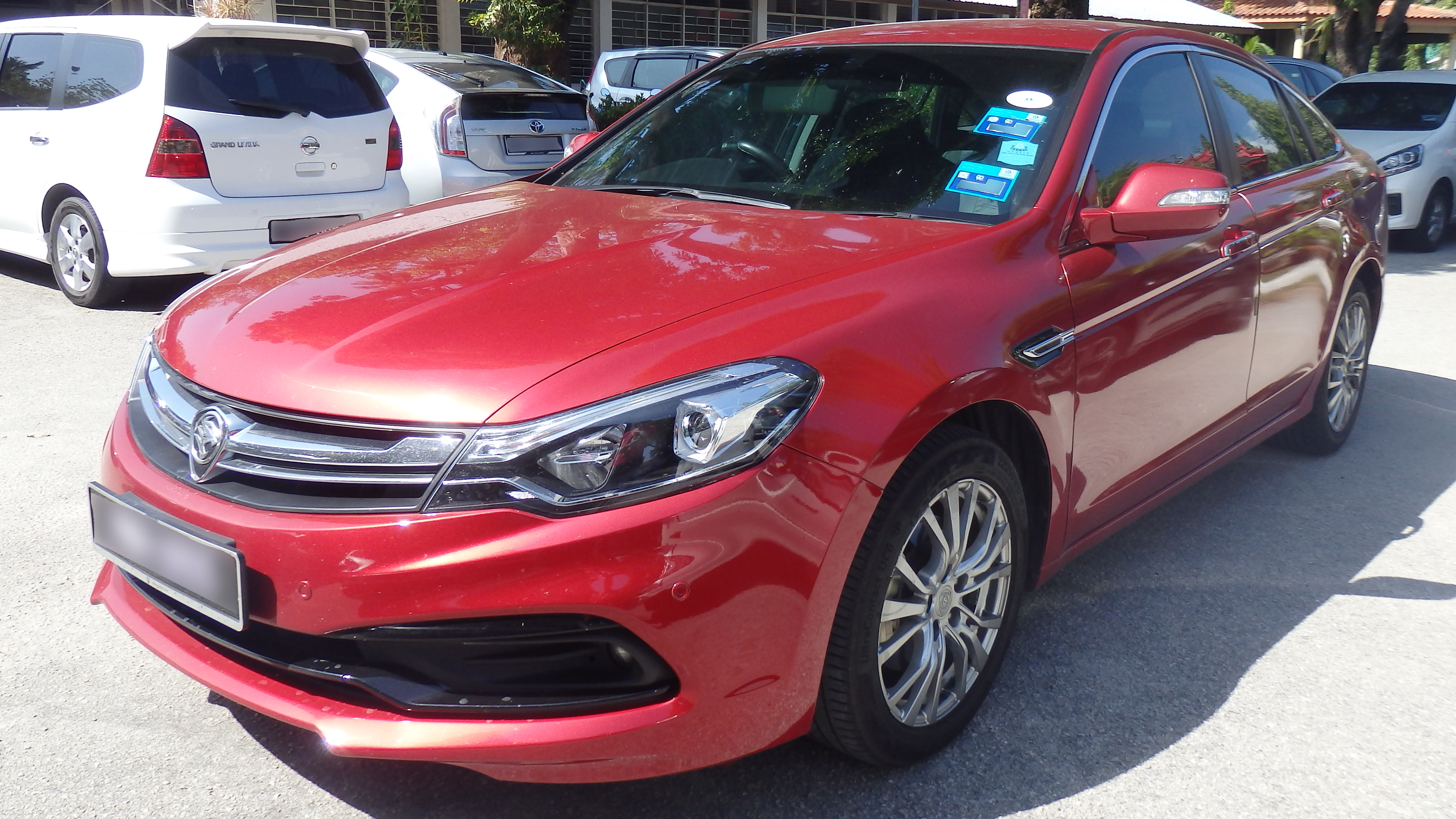
- 2016 Proton Perdana

Overview
- Manufacturer: Proton
- Also called: Mitsubishi Galant/Eterna (7th generation) (1st generation, 1995–2010); Honda Accord (8th generation)/Honda Inspire (5th generation) (2nd generation, 2013–2020)
- Production: 1995–2010 (1st generation); 2013–2020 (2nd generation)
- Assembly: Malaysia: Shah Alam, Selangor (PONSB); Alor Gajah, Malacca (Honda Malaysia Manufacturing Plant)

Body and chassis
- Class: Mid-size car (D)
- Body style: 4-door sedan
- Layout: Front-engine, front-wheel drive

The Proton Perdana is a series of four-door mid-size sedan cars produced by Malaysian automobile manufacturer Proton.

== First generation (1995–2010) ==
The first generation Proton Perdana is a badge engineered seventh generation Mitsubishi Eterna, developed as the result of a collaboration between Proton and Mitsubishi Motors. About 80,000 first generation Proton Perdana were sold between 1995 and 2013.

Proton refers to the 1995-1998 (non-V6) models as the first generation Proton Perdana and the 1998-2010 (V6) models as the facelifted Proton Perdana.

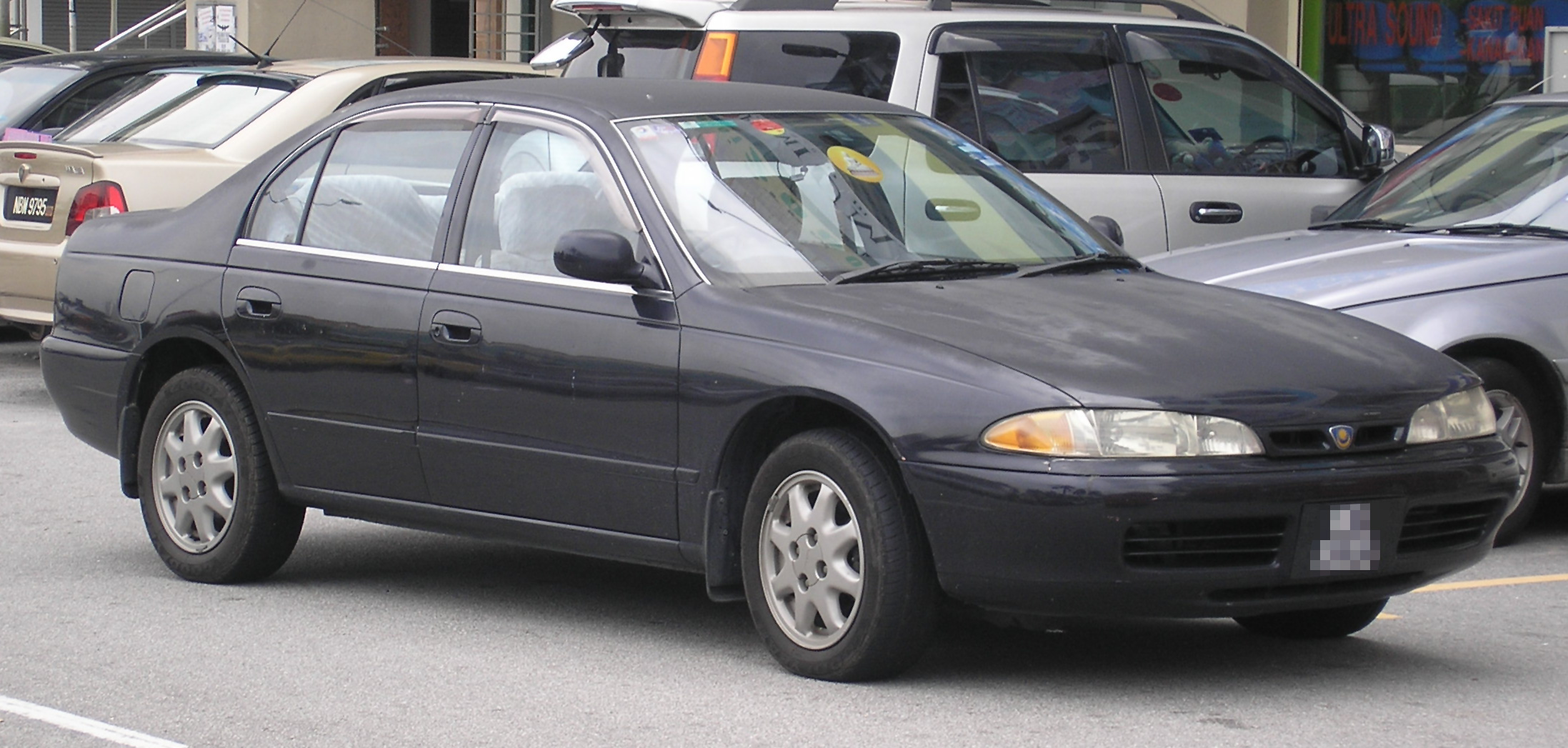
1995–1998

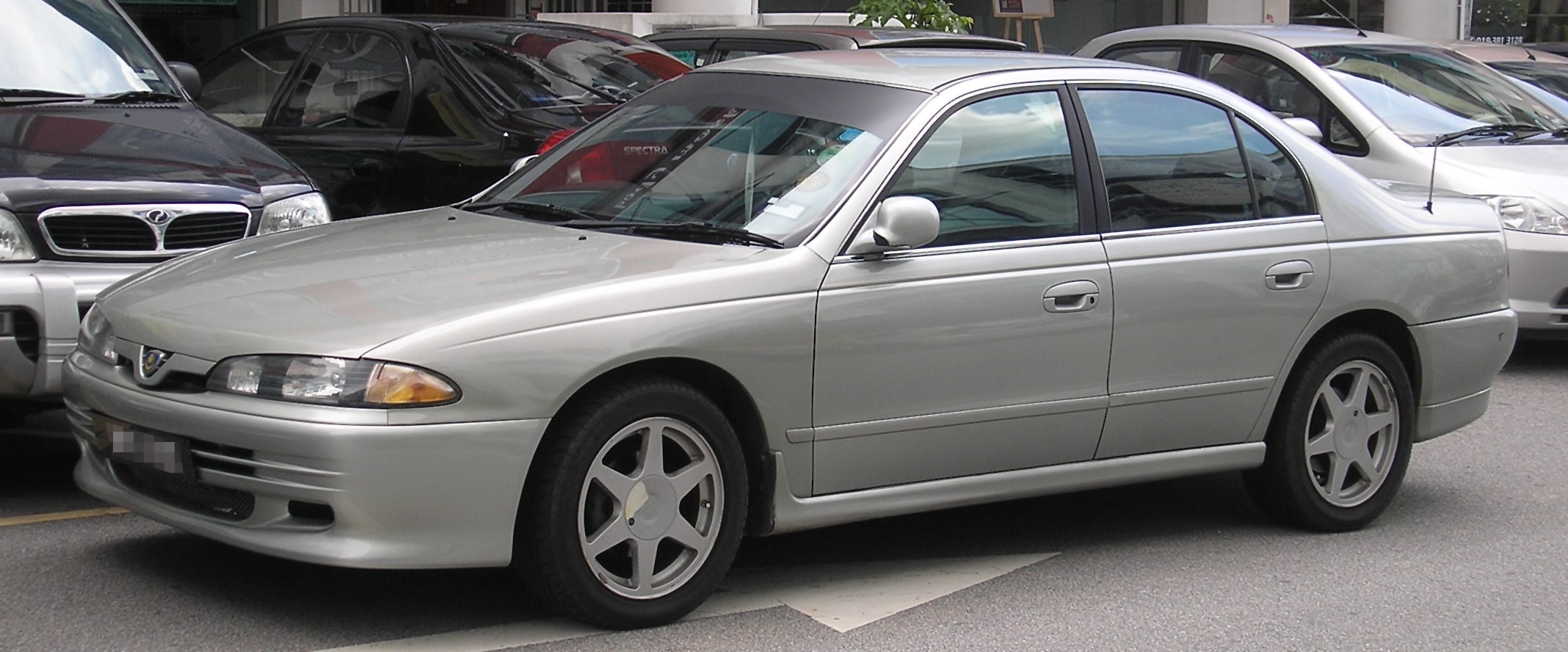
1998–2003

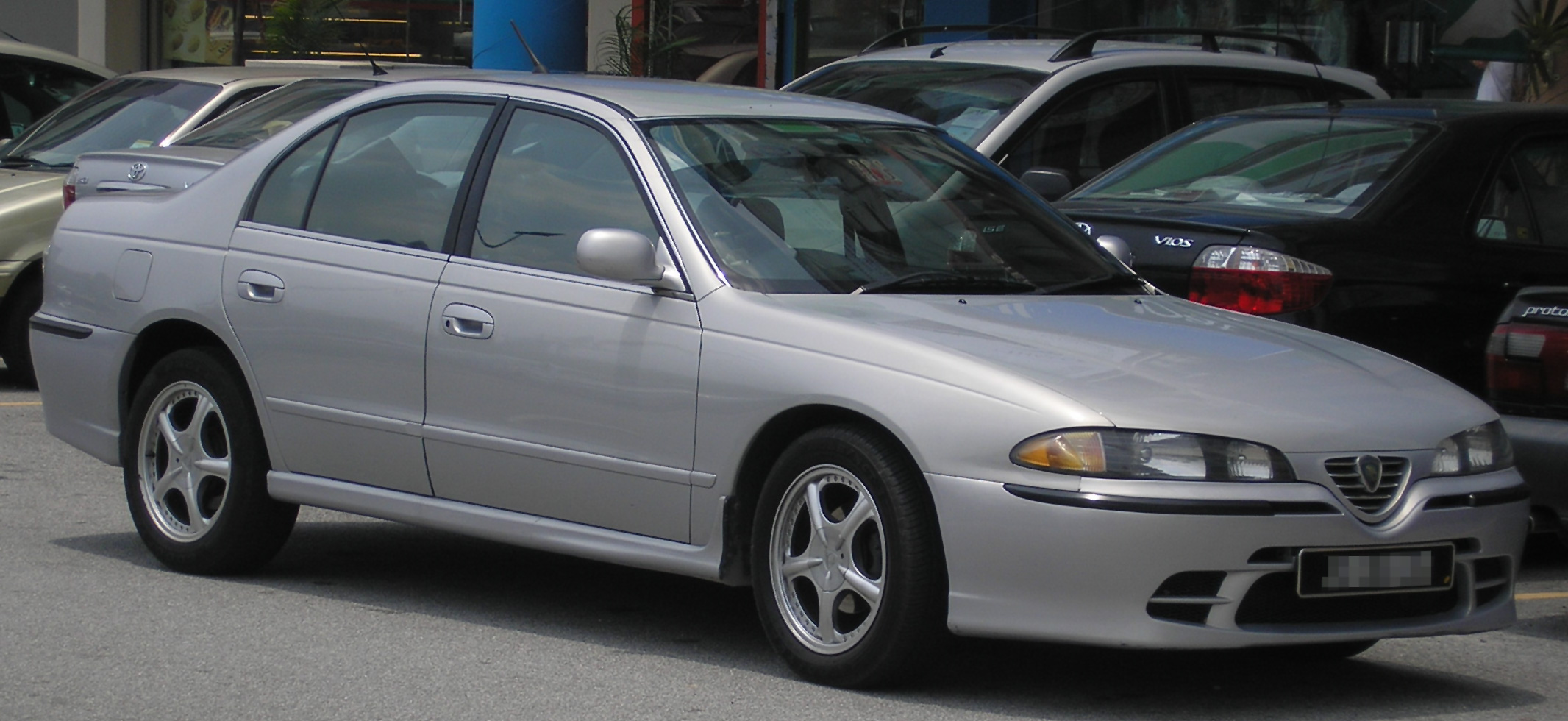
2003–2005

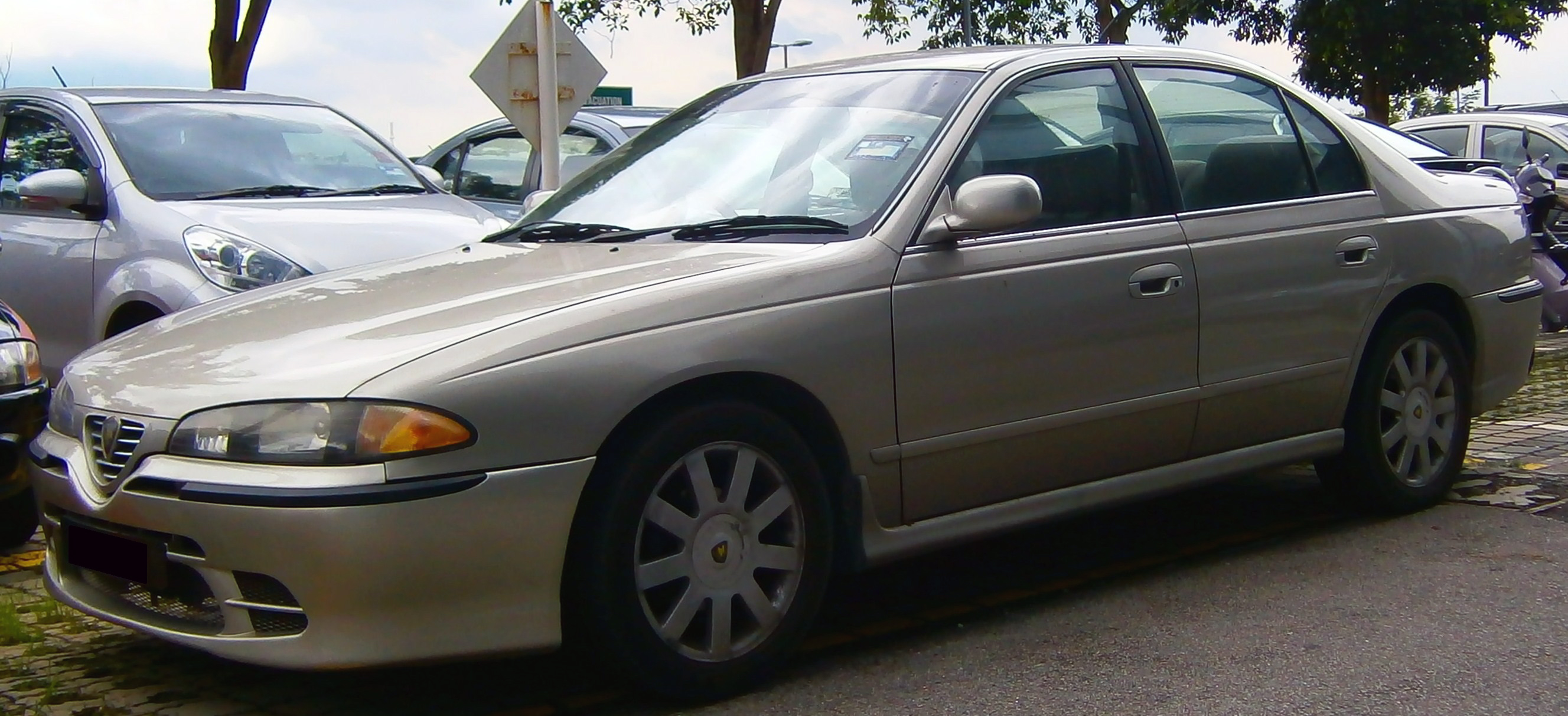
2005–2010

== Second generation (2013–2020) ==
The second generation Proton Perdana is a badge engineered eighth generation Honda Accord, developed as the result of a collaboration between Proton and Honda Motor Company, Ltd. Proton refers to the 2013–2020 models as the second generation Proton Perdana. However, the general public commonly refers both 2013–2015 models and 2016–2020 models based on the eighth generation Honda Accord as second generation Perdana.

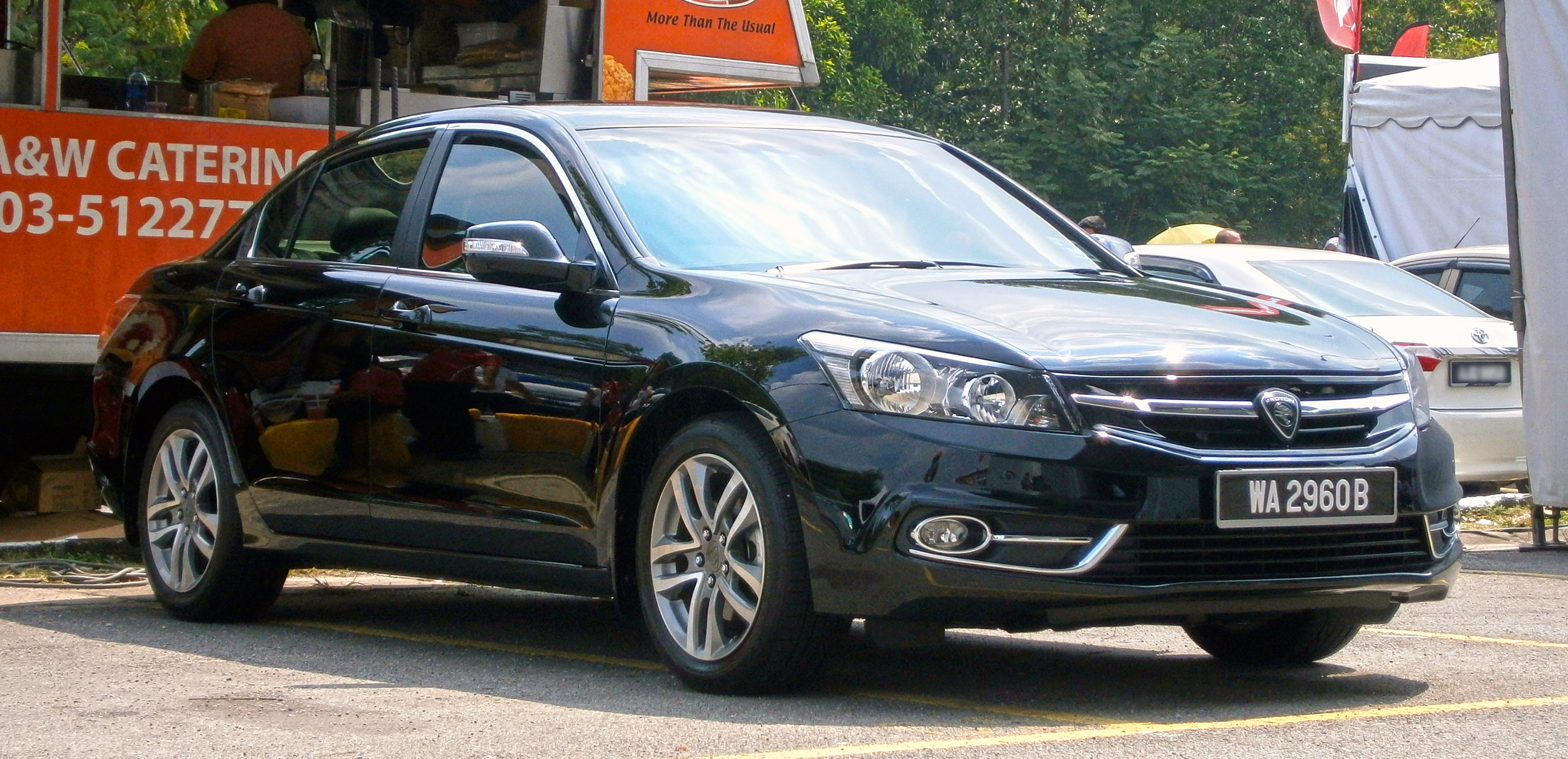
2013–2015

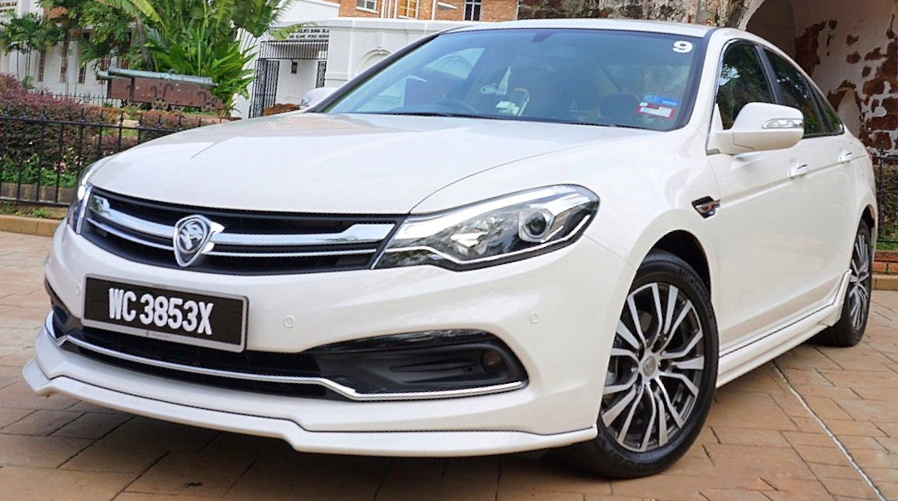
2016–2020
