= John Victor Morais =

Malaysian journalist (1910–1991)

Personal details
- Born: 18 December 1910 Federated Malay States (now Malaysia)
- Died: 6 March 1991 (aged 80)

John Victor Morais S.B.St.J also known as J. Victor Morais (18 December 1910 – 6 March 1991) was a Malaysian writer, journalist and managing director of several newspapers. He was also known as the editor and publisher of the biannual directory Who's Who in Malaysia and Singapore (ISSN 0303-6928, ISSN 0083-9620, OCLC 50350748 and OCLC 614945506), which was first published as The Leaders of Malaya and who's who in 1956. It was a successor of Who's Who in Malaya, which stopped to publish for about 30 years until the birth of Morais's Who's Who.

== Biography ==
Morais was the publisher of The Perak Times in Ipoh, Perak and other location, during the Japanese occupation of Malaya. After the war, he worked for several newspapers, such as Malaya Tribune and [unknown location] Daily News.

=== Political career ===
In 1948, Morais was also appointed as an unofficial member of the Perak State Executive Council.
