= Kembara Mahkota Johor =

The Kembara Mahkota Johor (English: Johor Royal Excursion, lit. 'Johor Crown Expedition'; Jawi script: كمبارا مهكوتا جوهر) is an annual royal motorcycle tour held by the state government of Johor, Malaysia under the direction of the Sultan of Johor, Sultan Ibrahim. The royal expedition is participated by a group of motorcyclists led by Sultan Ibrahim himself, travelling over hundreds of kilometers through all 10 districts of Johor. The Kembara Mahkota Johor is held to enable Sultan Ibrahim to meet with fellow Johoreans as well as to provide charity for the poor.

== History ==
The Kembara Mahkota Johor is a brainchild of Tunku Ibrahim Ismail, then the Crown Prince (Tunku Mahkota) of Johor, due to his desire to meet with fellow Johoreans and provide charity to the poor. According to him, during the feudal age, the king or the crown prince rode an elephant to travel all over the state for the same reason as the Kembara Mahkota Johor. The royal tour debuted on 2 July 2001, participated by a group of 28 motorcyclists led by the Tunku Mahkota himself and covered all 8 districts (now 10 districts) in Johor, with the total distance of 870 km.

During the tour, Tunku Ibrahim Ismail is famous for riding his trademark Harley-Davidson motorcycle with the "tiger stripe"-painted body. However, the 2002 edition of the tour was the only tour that he did not ride his Harley-Davidson motorcycle — instead, all participants rode the Modenas Jaguh motorcycle as Modenas became one of the main sponsor for the 2002 Kembara Mahkota Johor.

The 2008 edition of Kembara Mahkota Johor was held from 24 July to 27 July 2008, covering all 10 districts of Johor with the total distance of 910 km. The expedition started from Johor Bahru and ended at Kulaijaya.
