= Sultanah Aminah Hospital =

Hospital in Johor Bahru, Johor, Malaysia

Coordinates: 1.4587954°N 103.746101°E

Sultanah Aminah Hospital Hospital Sultanah Aminah

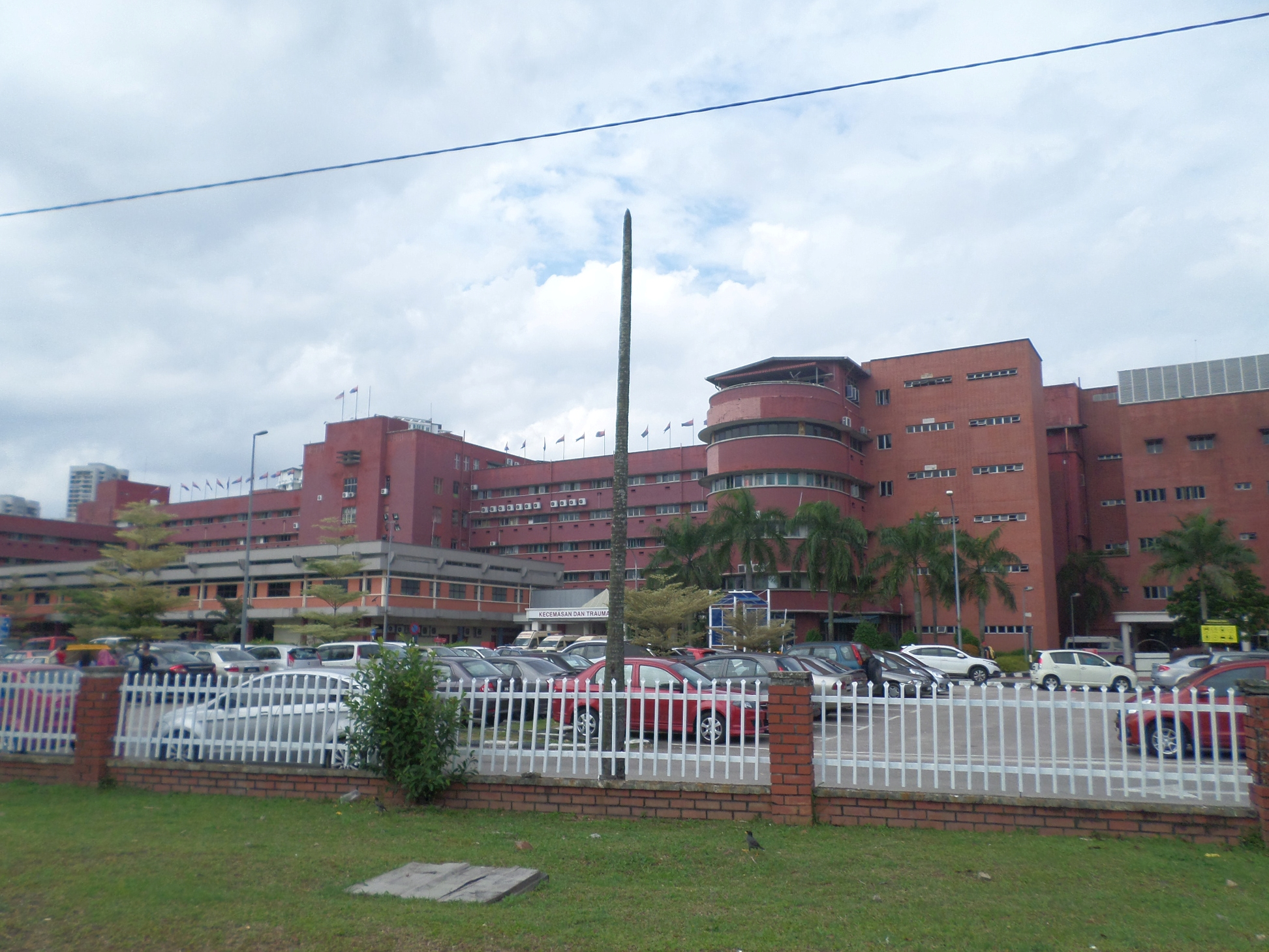

Geography
- Location: Johor Bahru, Johor, Malaysia

Organisation
- Type: District General

Services
- Emergency department: Yes
- Beds: 857

History
- Founded: 1882

Links
- Website: hsajb.moh.gov.my/versibaru/
- Lists: Hospitals in Malaysia

The Sultanah Aminah Hospital (HSA; Malay: Hospital Sultanah Aminah) is one of the oldest historical government-funded district general hospital since 1882, it located in Johor Bahru, Johor, Malaysia. It is the largest hospital in Johor and the main referral and tertiary health centre for the state. HSA is also one of the busiest hospitals in Malaysia based on patient load. However, budget cuts have affected its level of service.

== History ==
It was founded in 1882 as the Johor Bahru General Hospital, and has served as the city's and district's principle public medical centre since its inception. The present main building, a massive complex fashioned in a brick facade Streamline Moderne style, was constructed between 1938 and 1941 to replace the existing complex that had grown from the original 1882 hospital building. The 1940s hospital building was further upgraded and expanded, including a two-storey lobby/emergency wing in front of the main building during the 1970s, and a new east wing and extensive refurbishment at a cost of RM 267 million in 2009.

The first public sector intensive care unit (ICU) in Malaysia was set up at the General Hospital in 1968 under the stewardship of the State Anaesthesiologist (Dato’) Dr T. Sachithanandan. Its ICU was officially declared open on 3 February 1969 by HRH Sultan Ismail of Johor. The funding to build the ICU was derived from the Ministry of Health (MOH), Johor state government and charitable public donations via fundraising by the Johor Baru Junior Chamber International (JCI-Jaycees). The hospital's unit became the model upon which subsequent ICU facilities were designed and built in numerous other MOH state general hospitals nationwide.

The first postgraduate medical center in Malaysia was also established at the General Hospital in 1969 by three medical pioneers; Dato' Dr Lim Kee Jin (physician), Dato' Dr. T. Sachithanandan (anaesthetist) and Datuk Dr. Sam C.E. Abraham (paediatrician).

The hospital would later be renamed in honour of Sultanah Ungku Tun Aminah binti Ungku Ahmad, Sultan Ismail's first wife, following her death in 1977.

=== 2016 fires ===
On 25 October 2016, a fire broke out in the ICU of the main building, killing six people and wounding another four. A day after, a second, smaller fire occurred in the operation theatre in the emergency and trauma ward.

With investigations ongoing into the causes of the fire, questions were raised on the long-standing lax safety standards of hospitals based in pre-war buildings that were constructed with few or no fire safety features, leading to intentions by the government to conduct safety audits of all hospitals in the country, starting with the oldest, including the 136-year old Batu Gajah Hospital and early blocks of the 130-year old Penang General Hospital.

== Transportation ==
The hospital is accessible by bus from Johor Bahru Sentral Bus Terminal (1B, 15, 111, 221, 331, 5B, 606, 7B, 777B, BET1, BET3, JPO1, S&S7), Muafakat Bus route P-101 or Causeway Link (1B, 5B, 51B) and Shuttle HSA bus.

== See also ==
- List of hospitals in Malaysia
