= Manikam =

Manikam is a given name. People with the given name include:

- Manikam Pillai
- Manikam Shanmuganathan

== See also ==
- Ratna Moetoe Manikam
