= T. Sachithanandan =

Sachithanandan Thambinathan (Tamil: ஸசிதாநந்தன் தம்பிநாதன்; 2 August 1931 – 28 May 1981), better known as T. Sachithanandan, was a Malaysian anaesthesiologist.

== Background ==
Born in Kuala Lumpur to ethnic Malaysian Indian parents of Sri Lankan Tamil ancestry, he attended Victoria Institution and graduated from the University of Calcutta (MBBS 1957) where he was the Founding President of the university's International Students Association. During his postgraduate specialist training in anaesthesia in the United Kingdom (1961–1964), Sachithanandan trained with post-war British anaesthesiologists that included John Alfred Lee (Southend-on-Sea Hospital), John Francis Nunn (Royal College of Surgeons of England research unit) and Professor Thomas Cecil Gray (Liverpool). He was conferred the F.F.A.R.C.S.I. a Fellowship in Anaesthesia by the Royal College of Surgeons in Ireland (Dublin 1963) in addition to the D.A (Royal College of Surgeons, England).

In 1964, Sachithanandan and JF Nunn et al. were the first investigators to demonstrate age-dependent airway closure in humans whilst breathing at residual volume. They observed the resulting desaturation was due to perfusion of unventilated alveoli. Their research findings still remains a highly cited British Journal of Anaesthesia publication with important implications for mechanical ventilatory support of the critically ill patient to correct the resulting hypoxaemia and atelectasis from the reduced lung volumes.

Upon returning to Malaysia, Sachithanandan was appointed consultant anaesthesiologist to the Johor Baru General Hospital (since renamed Hospital Sultanah Aminah) where he practised for two periods (1964–1971 and 1977–1981). His most notable contribution as Johore State Anaesthetist was to establish the first public sector intensive care unit (ICU) in Malaysia in 1968 at the Johor Baru General Hospital (JBGH). This ICU inspired the establishment of similar units in several other state general hospitals nationwide over the next decade. In 2010, Malaysia reported availability of over four hundred operational critical care ICU beds across 36 different government hospitals with a 90% bed occupancy rate.

Sachithanandan and two colleagues (pioneer physician Dr Lim Kee Jin and paediatrician Dr Samuel C.E. Abraham) also established Malaysia’s first postgraduate medical centre at JBGH in 1969. In 1972, Sachithanandan was elected President of the Malaysian Medical Association (the 14th MMA President), the first anaesthetist to hold such office. He served as Chief of Anaesthesiology in Ipoh General Hospital (1972–1977) establishing the state’s first postgraduate medical centre in 1976. As the Vice Dean of the inaugural Faculty board (1975–1977) and subsequently as Dean of the Faculty of Anaesthesiologists, College of Surgeons of Malaysia (1977–1979), he contributed to developing local specialist training and accreditation criteria which helped lay the foundation for a future local Masters certification in anaesthesia. Over 450 Malaysian doctors have since successfully completed a masters-certified local postgraduate training programme in anaesthesiology (up till 2008). Training aside, T.Sachithanandan also helped introduce the technique of regional anaesthesia nerve blockade here in Malaysia.

Sachithanandan was one of Malaysia's five pioneer consultant anaesthetists (with FR Bhupalan, AS Manavalan, Law Gim Teik and MC Poopathy) who founded the Malaysian Society of Anaesthesiologists (MSA) in 1963 and subsequently served as President of the MSA (1968–1969). He was one of the early Members of the Academy of Medicine, Malaysia (1969). In 1980, as one of the original group of eight pioneer doctor-business partners, Sachithanandan contributed to the clinical design of the Johor Specialist Hospital (JSH), the first private hospital in the state of Johor and the country’s first Kumpulan Perubatan Johor (KPJ) hospital. He never commenced practice at the JSH which opened in early May 1981. From the humble origins of this first hospital, KPJ has emerged to become Malaysia’s leading premier private healthcare provider with an annual turnover in excess of a billion ringgit from a network of 21 private hospitals employing over 800 medical specialists and is listed on the main board of the Kuala Lumpur Stock Exchange.

In 1980, Sultan Ismail of Johor awarded Sachithanandan the Dato Paduka Mahkota Johor (DPMJ), a state knighthood, for his contributions to medicine and anaesthesia. He died on 28 May 1981 at the age of 49, following a coronary artery bypass operation at the Harley Street Clinic in London. Beyond establishing Malaysia's first intensive care unit, Sachithanandan was involved in the clinical development of anaesthesia and intensive care services in Johor and Perak. He also participated in the training of specialists during the early development of the discipline in Malaysia. In 2018, the Malaysian Society of Intensive Care (MSIC) established the T. Sachithanandan Best Oral Presentation Award in his name, which is presented annually at the ASMIC scientific meeting.

T.Sachithanandan served as President of the Johor Cricket Council (1969–1971), Vice President of the Malaysian Cricket Association (1969–1970) and President of the Johor Baru Junior Chamber International (JCI-Jaycees) in 1969/70. He was actively involved with the Johor Red Crescent Society (as Chief Medical Officer), Area Surgeon of St. Johns Ambulance Brigade of Johor (1965–1971) and Chairman of the Johor Blood Bank & Transfusion Service (1966–1971).

Sachithanandan married Punithavathy Sinnathuray (sister of Singapore Supreme Court judge T. S. Sinnathuray and professor T. A. Sinnathuray) in 1965. They had two children both Dublin-trained physicians.
