= T. A. Sinnathuray =

Thirunavuk Arasu Sinnathuray (c. 1933- 1997) was a Malaysian obstetrician and gynaecologist. He was the first Malaysian doctor to possess both the diplomas of MRCOG (Member of the Royal College of Obstetrics and Gynaecology ) and the FRCS (Fellow of the Royal College of Surgeons).

== Career ==
He practised as an obstetrician at Kandang Kerbau Hospital (Singapore). He was Honorary Secretary of the Singapore Medical Association (SMA) (6th council) in 1966/67. He delivered the 4th Galloway Memorial Lecture (Singapore Academy of Medicine) on Amniotomy in the Treatment of Placental Insufficiency Syndrome in 1964.

Sinnathuray was appointed Professor and Head of the Department of Obstetrics and Gynaecology at Faculty of Medicine, University of Malaya in 1970 and remained in office till 1986. The department gained full accreditation by the Royal College of Obstetrics and Gynaecology, United Kingdom in 1970, the first Malaysian unit to be so recognised. Sinnathuray headed a team of twelve specialists who successfully performed the first intrauterine transfusion in Southeast Asia in early 1970. In 1980, Sinnathuray was appointed Dean of the Faculty of Medicine, UM. He was a prolific researcher with over 60 scientific publications in indexed medical journals in an era that predated the internet or evidence-based medicine.

In 1982, Sinnathuray was appointed vice-chairman of the 7th session of the Regional Western Pacific Advisory Committee on Medical Research (WPACMR) at the World Health Organization (WHO) and in 1985 Sinnathuray became the first academic from an ASEAN university to be invited as an external examiner to Australia. He was President of the Obstetrical and Gynaecological Society of Malaysia (OGSM) in 1971/72.

== Personal life ==
He studied at Raffles Institution and graduated from the University of Malaya (in Singapore) in 1956. Sinnathuray married twice. He died in 1997 (aged sixty-four) from chronic diabetes-related cardiovascular disease. He is survived by two sons from his first marriage, both British/Irish trained doctors; a paediatrician (Kanaga Raj) and an otorhinolaryngologist (ENT surgeon) (Arasa Raj). T.A.Sinnathuray and pioneering anaesthesiologist T.Sachithanandan were brothers-in-law. His elder brother is retired Singapore judge T. S. Sinnathuray, who was born on 22 September 1930 and died on 18 January 2016 after attaining the age of 85.

== Recognition ==
Sinnathuray was knighted by the 5th Yang di-Pertua (Governor) of Penang, His Excellency Tun Awang Hassan (himself an eminent first generation obstetrician) when he was conferred the Darjah Setia Pangkuan Negeri (DSPN) in 1985.

The TA Sinnathuray Academic Award in Obstetrics and Gynaecology was inaugurated in 2005 in his memory and is awarded to the First Prize Medallist in the final Masters examination in Obstetrics and Gynaecology (Conjoint Board of University of Malaya, University Sains Malaysia and Universiti Kebangsaan Malaysia).
