= Manikam Shanmuganathan =

Malaysian field hockey player and coach

Personal information
- Full name: Manikam N. Shanmuganathan
- National team: (Federation of Malaya) Malaya / Malaysia (1954–1964)
- Born: c. 1927 Ipoh, Perak, British Malaya
- Died: Before 2022 Ipoh, Perak, Malaysia

Sport
- Sport: Field hockey
- Position: Fullback
- Club: Perak (1950); Selangor (1951–1954)
Medal record
Men's field hockey
Representing Malaya
Asian Games
Bronze medal – third place	1962 Jakarta	Team

Manikam N. Shanmuganathan (born c. 1927 – died before 2022) was a Malaysian field hockey player and coach. A fullback, he represented Malaya and later Malaysia internationally over a decade-long career. He competed at the 1956 Summer Olympics in Melbourne — Malaya's Olympic debut — and the 1964 Summer Olympics in Tokyo. He captained the Malayan team to a bronze medal at the 1962 Asian Games in Jakarta, the nation's first medal in a major international hockey tournament. After retiring as a player, Shanmuganathan became a national hockey coach.

== Early life and family ==
Shanmuganathan was born around 1927 in Ipoh, Perak, during the British colonial era. He was of Tamil descent, part of a prominent family with deep roots in Perak's colonial history.

He was the grandson of K. Malaiperumal Pillay, a significant figure in Perak's development. Malaiperumal Pillay was born on 3 June 1866 in Karaikal, French India, and arrived in Malaya in 1889. Rising from humble origins as a construction labourer, Malaiperumal Pillay became a major contractor and land proprietor in Batu Gajah, where he founded the Government English School in 1907 — the first English-medium school in the town. He personally funded the school, recruited its first three teachers from Taiping, and paid all salaries for the initial two years before handing it to the colonial government in 1910. The school was later renamed Sultan Yussuf School on 15 October 1951, after the 32nd Sultan of Perak. Its most notable alumni include Sultan Azlan Shah (34th Sultan of Perak and 9th Yang di-Pertuan Agong) and Jeffrey Cheah (founder of Sunway Group).

Malaiperumal Pillay also built the Sri Subramaniyar Swami Kovil in Batu Gajah in 1928 and was responsible for much of the town's early infrastructure. The neighbourhood Kampung Malaiperumal in Batu Gajah is named after him.

Malaiperumal Pillay had married Sellathammal, a daughter of Marimuthu Ammal and Muthu Ramalingam Pillay — a pioneering couple who migrated from Karaikal to Taiping in the 1870s and were among the contractors of the first railway in British Malaya (the Port Weld–Taiping line, opened 1885). Their descendants, numbering over 2,000 across eight generations as of 2026, are organised as the Muthu Ramalingam Pillai & Marimuthu Ammal Family Association (MRP&MMAFA), formally registered in 2018.

Shanmuganathan was educated at the Government English School in Batu Gajah — the school his grandfather had founded — where field hockey was an established activity.

== Domestic career ==
Shanmuganathan debuted for the Perak state team as a fullback in 1950. He represented North Malaya, a regional combined side, in 1951–1952, before moving to Selangor, where he played from 1951 to 1954 in state-level competitions. In 1956 he appeared for South Malaya in domestic fixtures. He also played football for Selangor in 1952–1953.

== International career ==
=== National team selection ===
Shanmuganathan was selected for the Malayan national hockey squad in 1954, where he served as a fullback through 1956.

=== 1956 Summer Olympics ===
Shanmuganathan was part of the Malayan team at the 1956 Summer Olympics in Melbourne, marking the nation's debut in the Olympic hockey tournament. In the preliminary Group B, Malaya drew 2–2 with Great Britain, lost 3–2 to host nation Australia, and drew 1–1 with Kenya. In the classification round for 9th–12th place, Malaya defeated Afghanistan 4–0, the United States 3–0, and Kenya 3–2, finishing 9th overall out of 12 teams with three wins, two draws, and one loss.

=== 1962 Asian Games ===
Shanmuganathan represented Malaya at the 1962 Asian Games in Jakarta, serving as team captain. The tournament was held from 25 August to 3 September at the Senayan Hockey Stadium, featuring nine teams. Malaya competed in Group A, where they lost 3–0 to India, beat South Korea 5–1, and defeated Hong Kong 4–0 to advance to the semi-finals. After a 5–0 semi-final loss to eventual champions Pakistan, Malaya beat Japan 2–0 in the third-place match, with goals from C. Paramalingam and Dr R. Duraisingam, securing the bronze medal. This was the nation's first medal in a major international hockey competition.

=== 1964 Summer Olympics ===
Shanmuganathan represented the newly formed Federation of Malaysia at the 1964 Summer Olympics in Tokyo, at approximately 37 years of age. Malaysia competed in Pool B, playing seven matches with two wins, two draws, and three losses. Results included a 4–1 victory over Hong Kong, a 3–1 win over Canada, draws of 3–3 with Belgium and 0–0 with West Germany, and defeats to India (1–3), Spain (0–3), and the Netherlands (0–2). The team finished tied for 9th with Great Britain.

== Post-playing career ==
After retiring from competitive play following the 1964 Olympics, Shanmuganathan became a national hockey coach, joining several of his 1962 Asian Games teammates who also moved into coaching roles. He lived a low-profile life in Ipoh during his retirement years.

== Death and legacy ==
Shanmuganathan died before 2022. At a reunion of the 1962 Asian Games bronze-medal team at the Royal Commonwealth Society of Malaysia clubhouse in October 2022, he was listed among the squad members who had passed away.

His career spanned a formative period in Malaysian hockey, from Malaya's Olympic debut in 1956 through the country's transition to the Federation of Malaysia in 1963. As an ethnic Tamil athlete, his achievements highlighted pathways for community representation in national sports. He was also a notable descendant of one of Perak's most prominent colonial-era Tamil families, whose contributions to education, infrastructure, and community-building in Batu Gajah and Taiping remain physically present today.

== See also ==
- Malaya at the 1956 Summer Olympics
- Malaysia at the 1964 Summer Olympics
- Field hockey at the 1962 Asian Games
- SMK Sultan Yussuf
