= Augustine Paul =

Malaysian federal court judge

Dato' Sri S. Augustine Paul (12 October 1944 – 2 January 2010) was a Malaysian federal court judge.

== Early life ==
Augustine was born on 12 October 1944 in Batu Gajah, Perak.

== Career ==
Paul obtained his Barrister-at-Law from Inner Temple, England, began his career in 1971 as Federal Counsel at the Attorney-General's Chambers and later as a magistrate in Ipoh, Perak. Before that, he also served as a Sessions Court judge in Temerloh, Pahang, Malacca and Penang and was chairman of a special committee on taxation before being appointed to the Kuala Lumpur High Court Bench in May 1998.

He was confirmed as a High Court judge for less than six months when he presided over Anwar Ibrahim's sodomy and corruption cases which started in November, 1998. Seven years later, in 2005 Augustine was appointed Federal Court judge and he had several months to go before retiring.

== Death ==
On 2 January 2010, Paul died at the Selayang Hospital at the age of 65 after suffering from chronic illness.

== Honours ==
- Penang
  - Distinguished Conduct Medal (PKT) (1991)
- Pahang
  - Knight Companion of the Order of the Crown of Pahang (DIMP) – Dato' (2000)
  - Knight Companion of the Order of Sultan Ahmad Shah of Pahang (DSAP) – Dato' (2003)
  - Grand Knight of the Order of the Crown of Pahang (SIMP) – formerly Dato', now Dato' Indera (2004)
  - Grand Knight of the Order of Sultan Ahmad Shah of Pahang (SSAP) – Dato' Sri (2006)
