= David Fasken (cricketer) =

English cricketer and businessman (1932–2006)

Personal information
- Full name: David Kenneth Fasken
- Born: 23 March 1932; Batu Gajah, Perak, Federated Malay States
- Died: 24 May 2006 (aged 74); London, England
- Batting: Right-handed
- Bowling: Right-arm medium-fast

Domestic team information
- Years: Team
- 1950–1955: Oxfordshire
- 1953–1955: Oxford University
- 1956–1959: Marylebone Cricket Club

Career statistics
Competition	First-class
Matches	36
Runs scored	559
Batting average	12.42
100s/50s	–/1
Top score	61
Balls bowled	5,715
Wickets	71
Bowling average	40.30
5 wickets in innings	1
10 wickets in match	–
Best bowling	5/108
Catches/stumpings	21/–
- Source: Cricinfo, 3 June 2019

David Kenneth Fasken (23 March 1932 – 24 May 2006) was an English first-class cricketer and businessman. Fasken played first-class cricket for several teams between 1953–1962, though he played predominantly for Oxford University. After graduating from the University of Oxford, he became a director for the Earls Court and Olympia exhibition centres, helping them become world leading exhibition venues.

== Life, cricket and business career ==
Fasken was born into a military family at Batu Gajah in British Malaya in March 1932. His family moved back to England in 1937, where he attended the Dragon School at Oxford, before attending Wellington College. From Wellington he went up to Trinity College, Oxford, where he studied languages. He had debuted for Oxfordshire in minor counties cricket in the 1950 Minor Counties Championship. While studying at Oxford he made his debut in first-class cricket for Oxford University against Lancashire at Oxford in 1953. He played first-class cricket for Oxford until 1955, making 27 appearances and gaining a blue. Playing as a right-arm medium-fast bowler, he took 58 wickets for the university at an average of 35.94, with best figures of 5 for 108 against the touring Australians in 1953. With the bat he scored 403 runs with a high score of 61. In addition to playing first-class cricket for Oxford University, Fasken also played three matches apiece for the Marylebone Cricket Club from 1956–59, and for the Free Foresters from 1959–62. He also played at first-class level for D. R. Jardine's XI and L. C. Stevens' XI. He played his final minor counties match for Oxfordshire in 1955.

After graduating from Oxford, Fasken decided not to take up a career as a cricketer, stating that "the life" never appealed to him. Instead he took up a career managing exhibition centres, including Earls Court and Olympia, both of which he was vice-president until his retirement in 1993. During his tenure he helped Olympia to become one of the world's leading exhibition venues. He was also a major factor in the development of Earls Court Two in the late 1980s. When he was 69 he was diagnosed with hydrocephalus, which required several shunts to slow the progression of the condition. He spent four months in hospital with a kidney infection shortly before his death. He returned home for a month, but died on 24 May 2006, following a fall down the stairs at his home. He was survived by his wife Susan of 38 years and their two children Joanna and Hugh and three grandchildren.
