= Kelvin Lim Hock Hin =

Singaporean serial sex offender

- 1996 police mugshot of Lim after his third arrest
- Born: Lim Hock Hin; 1968 (age 57–58); Singapore
- Other names: Kelvin Lim; Ah Pui
- Occupations: Cleaning supervisor (former; 1995 - 1996)
- Status: Incarcerated at Changi Prison since November 1996/presumably released from prison on parole since 2023
- Convictions: 1988; Carnal intercourse (three counts); 1993; Gross indecency (two counts); 1996; Anal intercourse (four counts); Oral sex (five counts); Attempted unnatural sex (one count)
- Criminal charges: 1987; Carnal intercourse (nine counts); 1993; Gross indecency (four counts); 1996; Anal intercourse (14 counts); Oral sex (25 counts); Attempted unnatural sex (one count)
- Penalty: 1988; 15 months' imprisonment 1993; 32 months' imprisonment 1997; 40 years' imprisonment

Kelvin Lim Hock Hin (林福兴 Lín Fúxīng; born 1968), a Singaporean citizen, is a convicted sex offender who committed various sexual offences against young boys between 1988 and 1996.

Prior to his latest arrest in 1996, Lim was jailed twice in 1988 and 1993 respectively for such crimes; 15 months' jail in 1988 and 32 months' jail in 1993. His modus operandi was to gain the trust of his victims as a friend and entice them to have sex with him by offering them free tuition and toys.

Lim's case first attracted widespread attention in 1997 when he was on trial for sexually abusing his two godsons and their three friends, all aged between nine and 13, and he was diagnosed with paedophilia, a sexual disorder which dictates a sexual interest in prepubescent boys. As Lim was assessed to be a chronic paedophile and that his risk of re-offending was high, the veteran judge T. S. Sinnathuray sentenced Lim, then 29 years old, to a total of 40 years' imprisonment, which marked the longest sentence ever imposed in a sexual crime up to that time.

== Personal life ==
Lim Hock Hin, also known as Kelvin Lim, was born in Singapore in 1968. He had one sister.

According to the mitigation plea of Lim's former lawyer in 1988, Lim was sodomized by a neighbour at age 14, which led to Lim supposedly manifesting some form of sexual interest towards young boys and led to his first offences in 1987. It was also said that Lim came from a dysfunctional family background during his childhood years.

== 1988 sex conviction and first jail term ==
Between June and November 1987, Lim had sexually abused four boys, aged between nine and 15, and court documents showed that Lim had enticed the boys into having sex with him by offering them free tuition and toys. After his arrest, Lim was tried in a district court for nine counts of unnatural sex, which included carnal intercourse with a minor. The district judge Tan Seck Sam sentenced Lim, then 20 years old, to 15 months in prison after Lim pleaded guilty to three out of nine charges (the remaining six were taken into consideration during sentencing) on 7 October 1988.

== 1993 sex conviction and second jail term ==
About three years after his release from his first prison sentence, Kelvin Lim once again returned to court for four counts of sexually abusing a nine-year-old boy whom he tutored for free. Lim was reported to have used the same modus operandi of enticing the boy to have sex with him in return for free toys and tuition, resulting in his sexual abuse of the boy between July 1992 and June 1993 prior to his arrest.

In September 1993, after his conviction for two out of the four unnatural sex charges (which Lim also pleaded guilty to), 25-year-old Lim was sentenced to 32 months of imprisonment, consisting of two consecutive jail terms of 16 months for each count he was convicted for.

Lim was released on 19 June 1995 on parole for good behavior.

== 1995 – 1996 sexual offences and arrest ==
Less than four months after his release from his second prison sentence, Kelvin Lim once again re-offended. This time, Lim targeted five boys aged between nine and 13, and his crime spree lasted from October 1995 to October 1996.

In September 1995, three months after his release, Lim met his first two victims, a pair of brothers aged ten and 12, at a game arcade in Queenstown Shopping Centre. He befriended them, and the boys quickly became close to him. He also built a good relationship with the boys' father, a carpenter who lost his wife to cancer in 1994. Lim later became the boys' godfather and also moved into their Bukit Merah flat in January 1996, and he also tutored the boys for free, enabling their grades to improve.

A month after befriending the boys, Lim first targeted the younger boy, asking him to have sex with him and offered him toys as a reward. Although the boy initially refused, he eventually gave in and agree to Lim's offer. The boy's older brother became the second victim afterwards, and regularly, Lim would commit the sexual acts with the boys, most of which occurred in their home, and would also bring them to shopping for toys and games.

In May 1996, Lim befriended his third and fourth victims, who were also brothers aged 11 and nine. The older brother was a classmate and friend of the first victim. It was the free tuition ploy used by Lim that allowed him to victimize the two brothers and also persuaded their mother that Lim was a decent person. The older brother became the third victim when he witnessed Lim engaging in a sexual act with his classmate, and Lim similarly asked the 11-year-old boy to also allow him have sex with him, offering him computer games as a reward. The third victim's nine-year-old brother later became the fourth victim of Lim's sexual crime after he was also lured by Lim's offer of toys and free tuition as well as being threatened by Lim using a cane; he was the only person whom Lim coerced with violence into engaging in sex with him.

In August 1996, an 11-year-old male classmate of both the first and third victim became Lim's fifth and final victim after he first met Lim at the flat of the first two victims. Lim convinced him to have sex with him and offered him rewards of new toys and gifts.

After preying on his fifth victim, Lim's third crime spree lasted for another two months until October 1996 when a classmate of the three 11-year-old victims was alerted to Lim's activities through a conversation with one of them. This prompted him to inform his father, who was horrified and, in turn, reported the incident to the school principal. After the teachers probed the victims about these events, a police report was filed against Lim, who was arrested on 6 November 1996 for these latest string of sexual offences.

After his arrest, 28-year-old Lim was charged with 40 counts of having unnatural sex with minors, including molestation, anal intercourse, and oral sex. Under the Penal Code in 1997, the crime of having anal intercourse with a minor (the most serious charge Lim faced at that point) carried a sentence of either life imprisonment or up to ten years in prison.

=== Trial and sentencing ===
On 30 June 1997, Kelvin Lim stood trial at the High Court for ten counts of unnatural sex, all of which Lim pleaded guilty to on the first day of trial. Lim, who was unrepresented, was prosecuted by Deputy Public Prosecutor (DPP) Ferlin Jayatissa for these ten counts, and the trial was presided over by veteran High Court judge T. S. Sinnathuray, who was best known for sentencing infamous child killer Adrian Lim to death for murdering two children at Toa Payoh in 1981, as well as sentencing British spree killer John Martin Scripps to death for killing a South African tourist in 1995.

In addition to his plea of guilt to the first ten charges, Lim agreed to have the remaining 30 charges taken into consideration during sentencing. None of the five victims were publicly named to protect their identities. Their parents were reportedly shocked to hear that their sons had been sexually abused by Lim, and the boys themselves were filled with trauma due to the sexual acts they were forced to do with Lim (one of them reportedly said he wished he had never met Lim).

Dr Liow Pei Hsiang, a psychiatrist, assessed Lim and found that he was suffering from a chronic condition of paedophilia, a sexual disorder in which a person displays sexual interest in prepubescent boys. It was found that based on Lim's condition, he had a high level of re-offending (which the prosecution cited in their submissions for a long term of imprisonment), and that Lim himself could distinguish right from wrong and was capable of self-control and able to make his choice on whether to have sex with young boys. It was also reported that Lim refused to accept treatment while in prison before the trial started.

On 29 August 1997, Justice Sinnathuray delivered his verdict on sentence. He accepted DPP Jayatissa's recommendations for a lengthy jail term in Lim's case, referring to the psychiatric opinion of Dr Liow that Lim was most likely to commit another string of similar offences on potential victims based on his severe paedophilic condition. He also agreed that Lim should be "effectively removed from society for a long period of time" to protect society and many other young children from a recalcitrant sexual predator like Lim; in addition, he took account of the many aggravating circumstances of Lim's case, including the trauma suffered by the five boys, which psychiatric experts cited could potentially lead to long-term impacts on their welfare and lives (including the possibility of them committing crimes).

Having noted that Lim was able to understand the full magnitude of his actions, and his mental responsibility was not diminished by paedophilia, Justice Sinnathuray also disregarded Lim's plea for leniency and imposed four consecutive sentences of ten years for four out of the ten charges he was found guilty of (ten years for each count). In total, 29-year-old Kelvin Lim Hock Hin was sentenced to 40 years' imprisonment, which was the exact penalty sought by the prosecution prior to Lim's sentencing trial.

=== Appeal ===
In November 1997, the Court of Appeal dismissed Lim's appeal against his 40-year term of imprisonment.

The appellate court's three judges – consisting of Chief Justice Yong Pung How, Judges of Appeal Thean Lip Ping (L P Thean) and M Karthigesu – took into consideration Lim's refusal of medical treatment, lack of familial support, and the great danger he posed to society given his paedophilic condition. They also affirmed the trial judge's findings that Lim was fully aware of the magnitude of his crimes and was still able to exercise his full control in making a choice of whether to give in to his sexual desires. For these reasons, they decided to not reduce his 40-year sentence.

Extracted from Lim Hock Hin Kelvin v Public Prosecutor [1997]:

There were no significant mitigating factors in this case. The learned judge (Sinnathuray) had found, rightly in our opinion, that paedophilia is not a disease or a physical illness but is a disorder. … Even if paedophilia is an illness, we reject any suggestion that the sufferer cannot help it and therefore carries only a diminished responsibility for his actions. There is no evidence that paedophiles cannot exercise a high degree of responsibility and self-control. The learned judge found that the appellant (Lim) had a choice of whether to commit paedophilic offences against the victims, and chose to do so.

It was reported that Lim, who was unrepresented, told the court that he wished to have his sentence lowered as his future was bleak, and he could not come to terms with the possibility of coming out of prison at age 55 (provided he was deemed eligible for parole at that point). He also stated he found religion in prison and would repent. However, Chief Justice Yong Pung How retorted that Lim himself had ruined his victims' future and pointed out the irony that Lim had committed his first offences in 1988 on two young boys, whom he met at church. He also reminded Lim that he could not show Lim leniency due to the necissity of isolating him from society for a substantial period of time to avoid any more children falling victim to his sexual desires. The judges also did not give in Lim's threat to commit suicide if his appeal failed.

The judgement of Lim's appeal was also considered a landmark case in Singapore's legal history. The appeal ruling also cited the judges' opinion that for future cases of similar crimes like those committed by Lim, if a sex offender was a chronic paedophile and that he was unable to or demonstrated no initiative to refrain himself from his sexual advances towards children, the offender should be sentenced to life imprisonment. This benchmark ruling, however, did not apply to Lim's case because he was sentenced before the date of the appeal verdict.

After his appeal failed, Lim remained in Changi Prison, where he had been since his arrest in November 1996, serving his 40-year sentence.

In late 2023, the prisons board announced that Kelvin Lim might be released on parole after serving 26 years behind bars.

=== Aftermath ===
Kelvin Lim's 40-year sentence for his third conviction for sexual crimes was reported to be the longest jail term ever meted out for a convicted sex offender in Singapore back in 1997. Also, this case was one of Justice T. S. Sinnathuray's last major cases before he retired from the Bench merely three weeks after Lim's sentencing. Sinnathuray himself would die at the age of 85 on 18 January 2016, and Lim's case was one of the notable cases he heard while as a judge.

Singaporean crime show True Files re-enacted the case, which first aired on television on 20 June 2002, as the ninth episode of the show's first season. Lim's victims were given fake aliases to protect their identities, and Lim was addressed solely by either his surname or "the man" throughout the episode for a similar reason. A school counsellor who counselled the boys agreed to be interviewed on camera, but his face was not shown to keep the boys' identities anonymous; he told the producers of the show that Lim had gained the trust of the boys by offering them toys and tuition, which allowed him to prey on the victims, whose parents were duped into thinking he was a good person, and this brought them considerable shock when the truth came out. Dr Liow Pei Hsiang, who appeared in Lim's trial, also gave her opinion during an interview on the show that it is necessary for a paedophile to come forward for psychiatric treatment as early as possible before he may potentially commit a sexual offence with minors; she also stated that parents should be more mindful of their children, teaching them children to differentiate between what is a "good touch" or "bad touch" (referring to touching private parts or areas that made a child uncomfortable) and to beware of strangers.

Throughout the next few decades, Lim's case was often recalled and referred to by judges or the media whenever there were several high-profile cases of offenders, including Malaysian engineer and hebephile Yap Weng Wah (30 years' jail and 24 strokes of the cane for raping 31 boys), paedophilic delivery driver Adam Darsin (20 years' jail for raping eight boys), an unnamed 30-year-old paedophilic teaching assistant (who was jailed 42 years with 24 strokes of the cane in August 2022 for raping 11 boys), and a tutor who was sentenced to 45 years in jail in June 2022 (but without caning as the offender was over 50 years old at sentencing). Lim's case was also cited as an example in 2021 when the need for deterring sexual crimes against minors was discussed in light of the case of serial sex offender Chock Soon Seng, a teacher who was sentenced to six strokes of the cane and eight years of corrective training for four counts of sexual penetration.

== See also ==
- Yap Weng Wah
- Peh Thian Hui case
- List of major crimes in Singapore
