= Tanjung Tualang Tin Dredge No. 5 =

Former dredge in Kinta, Perak, Malaysia

Coordinates: 4°23′48.6″N 101°3′11.2″E

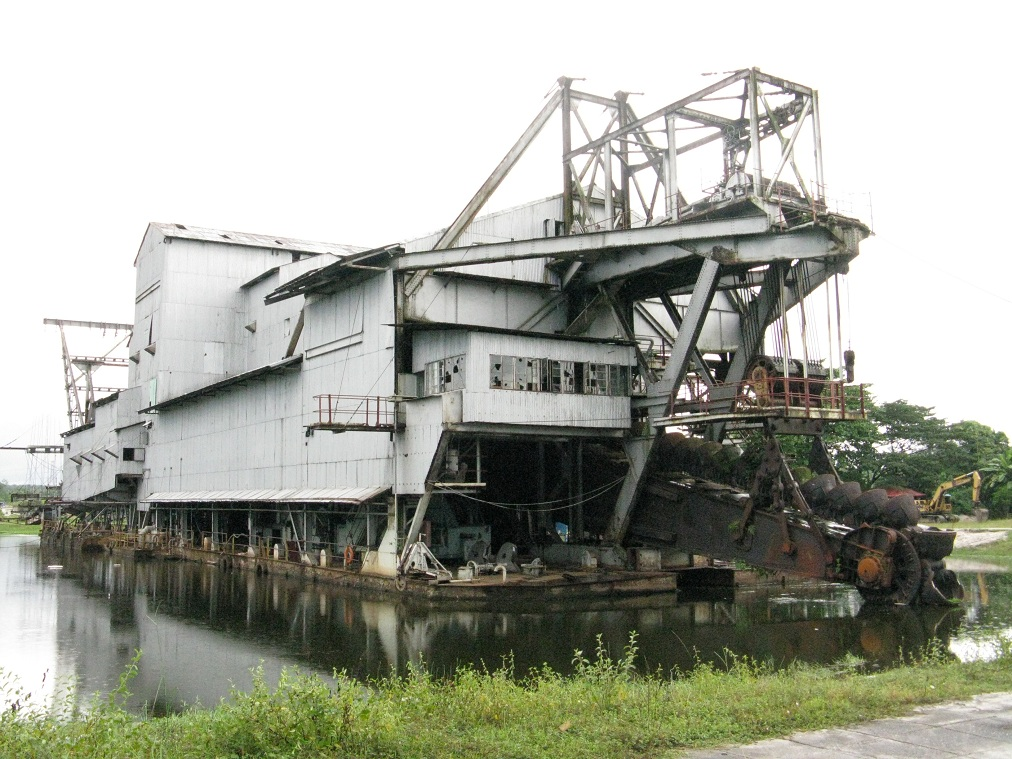
- Industry: tin mining
- Weight: 4,500 tons

The Tanjung Tualang Tin Dredge No. 5 (TT5) is a former tin mining dredge in Batu Gajah, Kinta District, Perak, Malaysia.

== History ==
The dredge was built in England in 1938 by F.W. Payne & Son, a major dredge engineering company at that time. With head of Engineer Othman/Alan Bruce. It was built for the Southern Malayan Tin Dredging Ltd., a company formed in 1926 which operated 6 dredges in total in Batu Gajah and Tanjung Tualang. TT5 was used for 44 years until 1982 when the Malaysian tin industries declined due to the falling world's tin price, exhausted tin deposits and high operating cost. In 2012, the facility was closed due to water leakage. Starting January 2015, the area is undergoing a MYR8.5 million renovation for 2 years which is carried out by Mentri Besar Incorporated.

== Technical details ==
The dredge weights 4,500 tons. It is supported by a floating dock with 75 meters in length and 35 meters in width and 3 meters in depth.

== See also ==
- Mining in Malaysia
