= SMK Sultan Yussuf =

Secondary school in Batu Gajah, Perak, Malaysia

- Sekolah Menengah Kebangsaan Sultan Yussuf
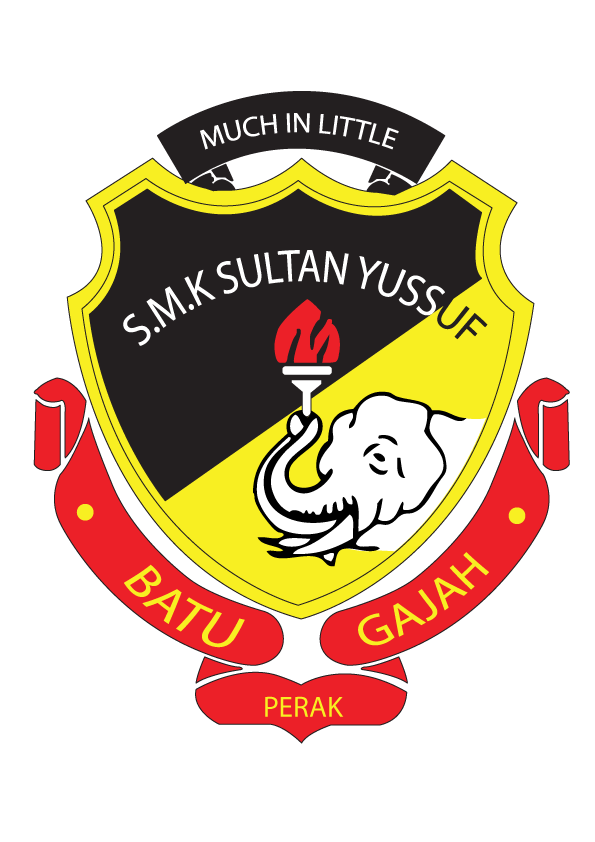
- Jalan Ilmu, 31000 Batu Gajah, Perak, Malaysia

Information
- Former name: Batu Gajah Government English School
- Type: Government secondary school
- Motto: Multum in parvo (Much in Little)
- Established: 1907
- Founder: K. Malaiperumal Pillay
- School number: AEB 2063

Sekolah Menengah Kebangsaan Sultan Yussuf (SMK Sultan Yussuf or SYS) is a government secondary school located in Batu Gajah, Perak, Malaysia. Founded in 1907 by K. Malaiperumal Pillay, a Tamil contractor and philanthropist, it was the first English-medium school in Batu Gajah.

The school's alumni include Sultan Azlan Shah (34th Sultan of Perak and 9th Yang di-Pertuan Agong), Jeffrey Cheah (founder of Sunway Group), and Olympic field hockey player Manikam Shanmuganathan.

== History ==
=== Founding (1907) ===
The school was established in 1907 by K. Malaiperumal Pillay, a self-made Tamil contractor and rubber planter who had migrated to Malaya from Karaikal, French India, in 1889. Despite his own limited formal education, Malaiperumal Pillay recognised the importance of English-medium schooling for local children and resolved to found a school at his own expense.

He established the school as a Private English School using his own house as the premises, personally going door-to-door in the neighbourhood to persuade parents to enrol their children. He gathered approximately 30 pupils for the first intake and recruited three teachers from Taiping: K. Mudalir (appointed as the first headmaster), S. Rajaratnam, and Krishnan Iyer.

Boys were educated free of charge. By the time of his death in 1935, Malaiperumal Pillay was paying the headmaster and a staff of ten teachers entirely out of his own pocket.

=== Government takeover (1908–1910) ===
In 1908, the school moved to a nearby site when the Batu Gajah Prison donated building materials from the old prison building. The local community cooperated in gotong-royong (communal self-help) efforts to construct the new school building, and M.C. Champion was appointed to replace K. Mudalir as headmaster.

Towards the end of 1908, the school was taken over by the State Government and renamed the Batu Gajah Government English School. An alternative date of 9 August 1910 for the formal handover is given in some sources, with enrolment having grown to approximately 80 students by that time.

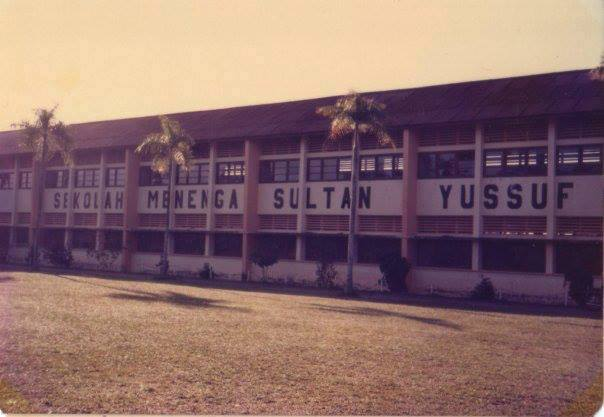
SMK Sultan Yussuf old school

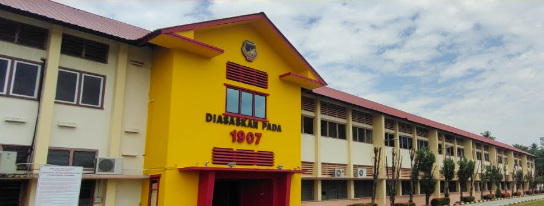
SMK Sultan Yussuf in 2026

=== Renaming and expansion ===
The school was renamed Sultan Yussuf School on 15 October 1951, after the 32nd Sultan of Perak, Sultan Yussuf Izzuddin Shah. In 1956, the school was divided into separate primary and secondary divisions to accommodate growing enrolment, which had reached 838 students by 1950.

The school published Seabad SYS (1907–2007), a centenary commemorative magazine documenting its history, and Tokoh-Tokoh Batu Gajah (2003), produced in partnership with Arkib Negara (National Archives of Malaysia).

Special education classes were inaugurated in May 2010.

== Founder ==
K. Malaiperumal Pillay (3 June 1866 – January 1935) was born in Karaikal, French India, and arrived in Malaya in 1889. He rose from humble origins as a construction labourer to become one of the wealthiest members of the Indian community in the Federated Malay States, with a fortune estimated to have exceeded one million Straits dollars. He was a major public works contractor responsible for much of Batu Gajah's early infrastructure, including the town prison (completed 1902), hospital, and major roads. He also owned a rubber estate and was a prominent philanthropist.

In addition to founding the school, Malaiperumal Pillay built the Sri Subramaniyar Swami Kovil in Batu Gajah in 1928, and the neighbourhood Kampung Malaiperumal is named after him. He also founded a maternity hospital in his native Karaikal and was awarded the Chevalier of the Legion of Honour by the French Government for his charitable works.

He was the son-in-law of Muthu Ramalingam Pillay and Marimuthu Ammal, a pioneering couple who had migrated from Karaikal to Taiping in the 1870s and were among the contractors of the first railway in British Malaya. Their descendants, numbering over 2,000 across eight generations as of 2026, are organised as the Muthu Ramalingam Pillai & Marimuthu Ammal Family Association (MRP&MMAFA).

== Notable alumni ==
- Sultan Azlan Muhibbuddin Shah (1928–2014) — 34th Sultan of Perak (1984–2014) and 9th Yang di-Pertuan Agong (1989–1994). Reportedly served as head student.
- Jeffrey Cheah — Founder and chairman of Sunway Group.
- Manikam Shanmuganathan (c. 1927 – before 2022) — Olympic field hockey player (1956, 1964) and captain of the Malayan team at the 1962 Asian Games (bronze medal). Grandson of the school's founder, K. Malaiperumal Pillay.
- Datuk Seri Dr N. S. Selvamany (1926–2019) — Tokoh Guru Kebangsaan (National Master Teacher, 1997). Honorary doctorate from the University of Malaya. Former schoolmate and close friend of Sultan Azlan Shah. A road in Ipoh, Jalan Datuk Seri NS Selvamany, was named in his honour in October 2022. Also a descendant of K. Malaiperumal Pillay.
- Kumaresan Aramugam — Batu Uban State Assemblyman.

== See also ==
- K. Malaiperumal Pillay
- Manikam Shanmuganathan
- Batu Gajah
- Education in Malaysia
