= T. S. Sinnathuray =

Singaporean judge (1930–2016)

T. S. Sinnathuray தி. ச. சின்னத்துரை

Judge of the High Court of Singapore
- In office 2 October 1978 – 23 September 1997
- Nominated by: Prime Minister Lee Kuan Yew
- Appointed by: President Benjamin Sheares

Senior District Judge of the Subordinate Courts of Singapore
- In office 1971–1978

First District Judge of the Subordinate Courts of Singapore
- In office 1967–1970

Personal details
- Born: Thirugnana Sampanthar Sinnathuray; 22 September 1930 Straits Settlements
- Died: 18 January 2016 (aged 85) Singapore General Hospital, Singapore
- Citizenship: Singaporean citizenship
- Education: UCL
- Awards: Bintang Bakti Masyarakat (Lintang) (Public Service Star (Bar))

Thirugnana Sampanthar Sinnathuray BBM(L) (22 September 1930 – 18 January 2016), known professionally as T. S. Sinnathuray and to his friends as Sam Sinnathuray, was a judge of the High Court of Singapore. Educated at University College London and called to the bar at Lincoln's Inn, he practised for a few years in a law firm before beginning a career with the Singapore Legal Service, serving with the Attorney-General's Chambers as Crown Counsel and deputy public prosecutor (1960–1963), and senior state counsel (1966–1967); with the Subordinate Courts as a magistrate (1956–1959), first district judge (1967–1970), and senior district judge (1971–1978); and with the Supreme Court as deputy registrar and sheriff (1959–1960), and registrar (1963–1966). In 1978 he was elevated to the office of Judge of the High Court of Singapore, and served until his retirement in 1997.

Notable cases judged by Sinnathuray included the Toa Payoh ritual murders trial in 1983, the 1988 legal challenge by the Asian Wall Street Journal against the Government's move to restrict its circulation for having engaged in the domestic politics of Singapore, and the trial of the serial murderer John Martin Scripps in 1995. In 1986 a commission of inquiry chaired by Sinnathuray found that allegations by opposition politician J. B. Jeyaretnam that the Government had interfered with the subordinate judiciary were unfounded. Sinnathuray was one of two foreign members of the Royal Tribunal, a panel of six judges convened by the Yang di-Pertuan Agong (King) of Malaysia to investigate alleged misdemeanours of Tun Salleh Abas, Malaysia's Lord President of the Supreme Court, in 1988.

Sinnathuray was the first non-European to act as the president of the Singapore Cricket Club (1976–1978). Following his retirement from the bench he pursued his interest in numismatics, becoming the chairman and chief executive officer of Mavin International Pte. Ltd., an auction company specialising in rare coins and banknotes.

For his judicial service, Sinnathuray was conferred the Bintang Bakti Masyarakat (B.B.M.; Public Service Star) at the National Day Awards in 1997. In 2009, he received an additional Lintang (Bar) on his B.B.M. for his membership of the Singapore Note and Coin Advisory Committee.

== Early life and education ==
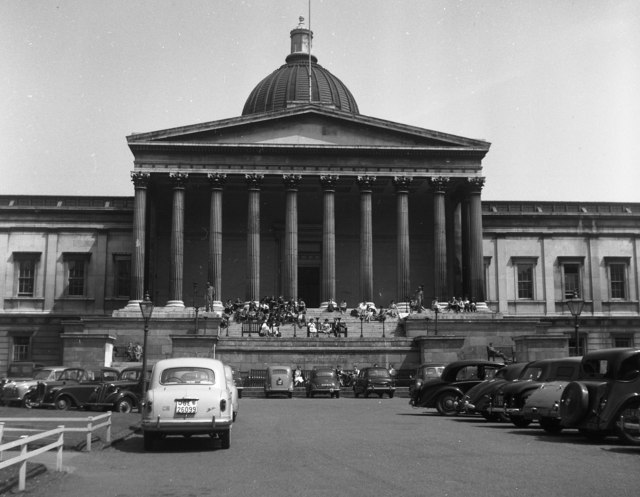
The Wilkins Building of University College London (UCL) in 1956. In 1953, Sinnathuray graduated from UCL with an LL.B.

T. S. Sinnathuray was born on 22 September 1930, the son of a school principal. He received his early education at Pearl's Hill School and Outram School, but this was cut short by the Japanese occupation of Singapore in February 1942. He continued his secondary education in Raffles Institution after World War II, completing his Senior Cambridge examinations there in 1948. He went on to read law at University College London and graduated in 1953. He was called to the Bar at Lincoln's Inn.

== Legal career ==
Upon Sinnathuray's return to Singapore, he practised law with the firm Oehlers and Choa. He was a magistrate of the Subordinate Courts of Singapore between 1956 and 1959. He was then appointed deputy registrar and sheriff of the Supreme Court of Singapore in 1959. Between 1960 and 1963 he was a Crown Counsel and deputy public prosecutor with the Attorney-General's Chambers (AGC), before returning to the supreme court to become the registrar from 1963 to 1966. He then became senior state counsel at the AGC (1966–1967), and first district judge (1967–1970) and senior district judge – the most senior judge – of the subordinate courts (1971–1978). On 2 October 1978, he was appointed a judge of the High Court of Singapore, and served until his retirement on 23 September 1997. At the time of his appointment, he was one of only six supreme court justices. On 1 August 1979, he was appointed the commissioner of appeals for land acquisitions.

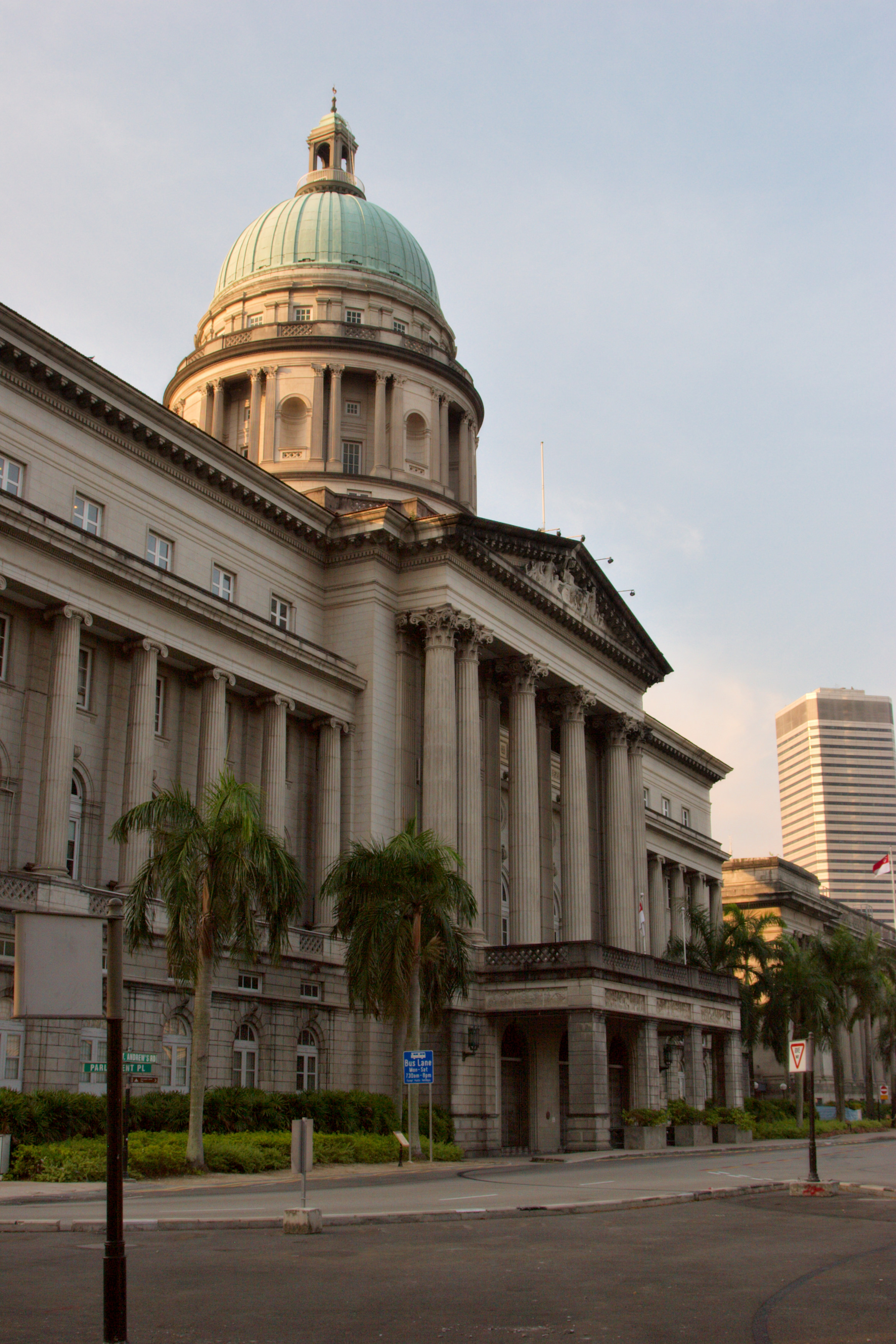
The Old Supreme Court Building in 2009. Sinnathuray was a judge of the High Court of Singapore between 1978 and 1997.

Notable cases judged by Sinnathuray included the Toa Payoh ritual murders trial in 1983, the trial of double murderer Flor Contemplacion in 1993, the $5 million heroin smuggling trial of Hong Kongers Tong Ching Man and her boyfriend Lam Cheuk Wang also in 1993, and the trial of the British serial murderer John Martin Scripps in 1995. Three weeks before his retirement from the Bench, on 29 August 1997, Sinnathuray made legal history when he ordered a 29-year-old serial sex offender Kelvin Lim Hock Hin to serve 40 years in prison for sexually abusing five boys in view of his paedophilic condition and high propensity to re-offend, and Lim's sentence was the reportedly the longest term of imprisonment imposed in a sexual crime back in 1997.

In 1985 he ruled that decisions of Singapore's Military Court of Appeal are not susceptible to judicial review in the High Court since the Military Court is a superior court of record. Sinnathuray also served as the third president of the Military Court of Appeal from 1990 until 30 November 1997, and was succeeded by Justice Goh Joon Seng.

On 16 May 1988, Sinnathuray ruled that the Singaporean Government was entitled under the Newspaper and Printing Presses Act to restrict the circulation of the Asian Wall Street Journal for having engaged in the domestic politics of Singapore. The decision was upheld by the Court of Appeal the following year.

Sinnathuray was the inaugural chairman of the ASEAN Law Association (ALA) (Singapore Chapter) when it was formed in 1980. On 18 April 1986, he was appointed by President Wee Kim Wee to chair a commission of inquiry to investigate allegations by opposition politician J. B. Jeyaretnam that the Government had interfered with the subordinate judiciary by ordering the transfer of Senior District Judge Michael Khoo to the AGC as Senior State Counsel and Deputy Public Prosecutor after Khoo had rendered a judgment which had allegedly displeased the Government. In a report released on 19 July 1986, the commission found the allegation to be unfounded. In 1988, Sinnathuray was one of two foreign members of the Royal Tribunal, a panel of six judges convened by the Yang di-Pertuan Agong (King) of Malaysia to investigate alleged misdemeanours of Tun Salleh Abas, Malaysia's Lord President of the Supreme Court.

== Other interests ==
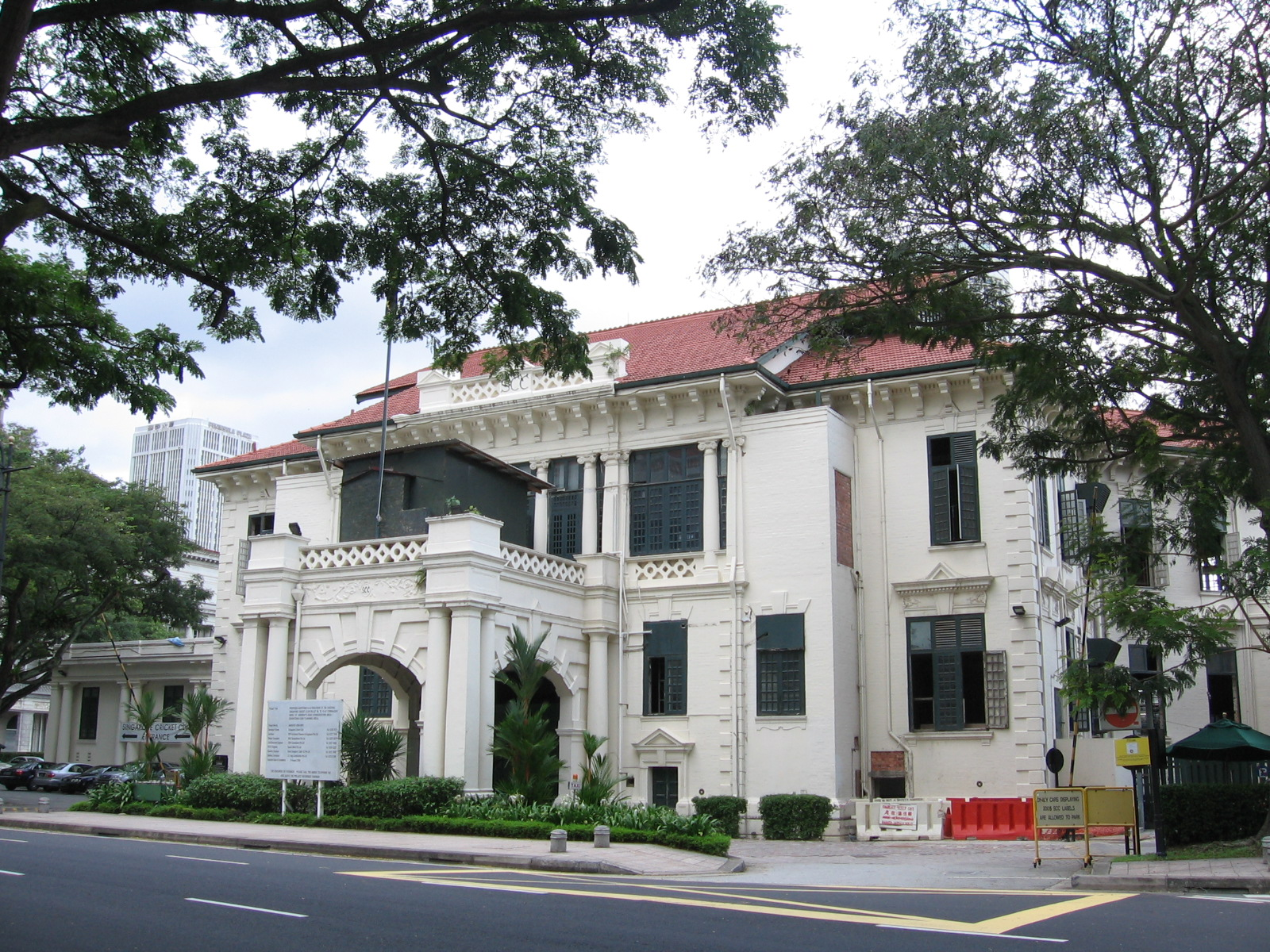
From 1976 to 1978, Sinnathuray served as the first non-European President of the Singapore Cricket Club (pictured in 2006)

Sinnathuray was the first non-European to be elected the president of the Singapore Cricket Club, serving from 1976 to 1978. In 1993, the Singapore Chapter of University College London Alumni was founded by Sinnathuray (who served as its first president) and his fellow alumni friends to provide for the welfare and interest of UCL graduates in Singapore and as a local platform for networking with members from other chapters around the world.

A numismatist and an expert on Singapore and Malaya postcards, Sinnathuray was the chairman of the Third Singapore Note and Coin Advisory Committee of the Board of Commissioners of Currency, Singapore, Monetary Authority of Singapore, serving from 1 April 2005 to 31 March 2008. He was also the chairman and chief executive officer of Mavin International Pte. Ltd., an auction company specialising in rare coins and banknotes.

== Death ==
Sinnathuray, who had a heart condition and was on dialysis, died of pneumonia at the Singapore General Hospital on 18 January 2016. He was survived by his wife Sandra Devi; his son Chandra Raj, daughter Shamona Ranee, and their spouses; and three grandchildren. His younger brother, the obstetrician and gynaecologist Datuk Professor Dr. Thirunavuk Arasu Sinnathuray, predeceased him in 1997. Chief Justice Sundaresh Menon said: "Justice Sinnathuray was a very popular judge who always treated counsel with great courtesy. He loved the law and the legal fraternity and made it a point to attend many of our functions and events for as long as he was able to. Many of us on the Bench today remember him warmly as a good friend and colleague. We will miss him dearly." The Attorney-General, V. K. Rajah, said that Sinnathuray had made "significant contributions" and would be "warmly remembered by the legal community for his unfailing courtesy and his commonsensical approach towards resolving knotty legal issues".

== Awards and honours ==
For his judicial service, Sinnathuray was conferred the Bintang Bakti Masyarakat (B.B.M.; Public Service Star) in the National Day Awards in 1997. In 2009, he received an additional Lintang (Bar) on his B.B.M. for his membership of the Singapore Note and Coin Advisory Committee.
