= Batu Gajah Hospital =

Hospital in Kinta, Perak, Malaysia

Batu Gajah Hospital Hospital Batu Gajah
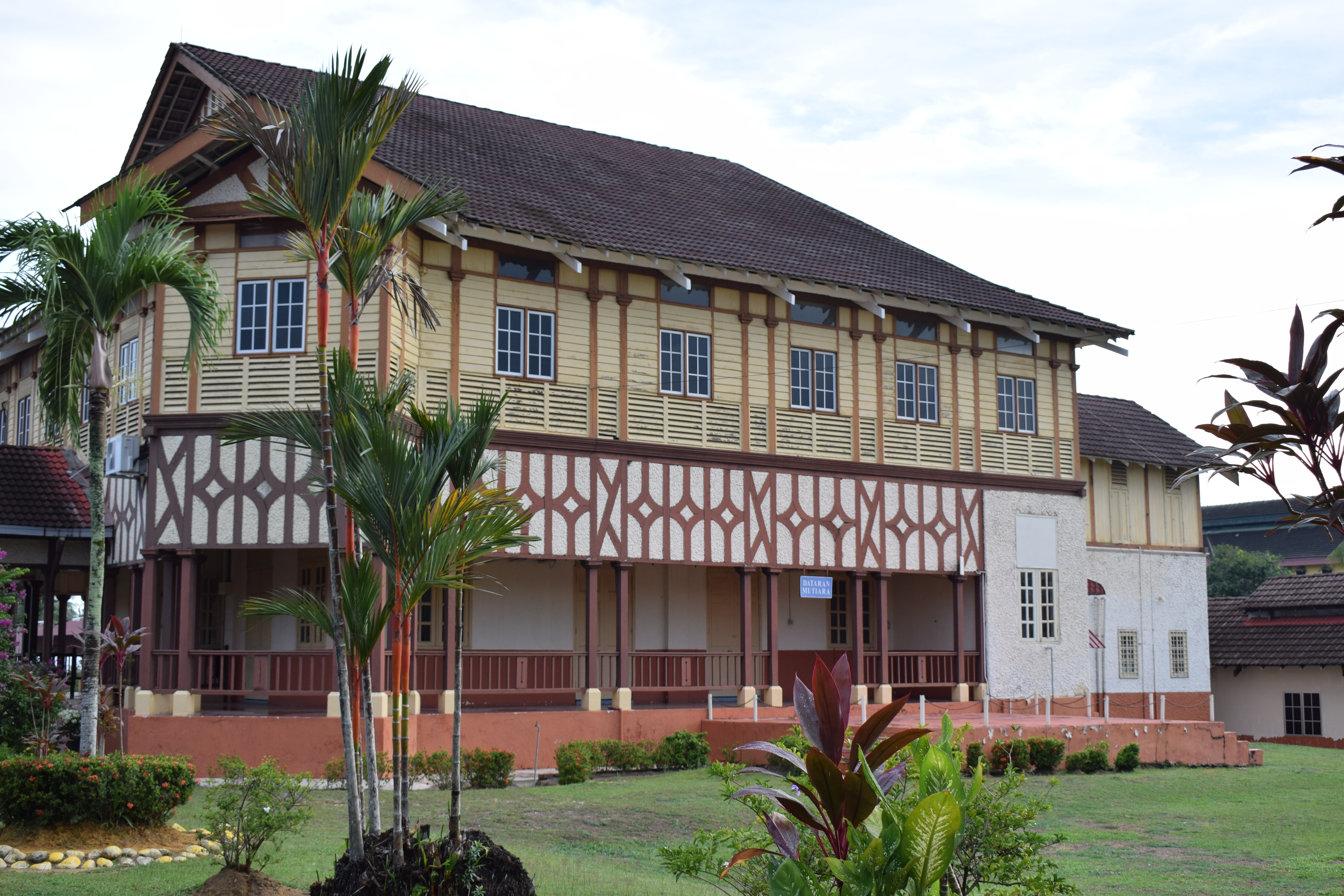

Geography
- Location: Batu Gajah, Kinta, Perak, Malaysia
- Coordinates: 4°28′46.9″N 101°2′3.8″E

Organisation
- Care system: Public
- Type: District General, Community

Services
- Emergency department: Yes
- Beds: 160

History
- Founded: 1880

The Batu Gajah Hospital (HBG; Malay: Hospital Batu Gajah) is government founded rural general hospital in Batu Gajah, Kinta District, Perak, Malaysia.

== History ==
The hospital was constructed in 1880 by the British Malaya government. In 1941, the hospital was taken over by the Japanese government. In 1946, the hospital opened its X-ray department. In 1956, a nursing training center was opened at the hospital. In 1976, the hospital lost its general hospital status over Ipoh Hospital.

== Architecture ==
The hospital on top of a 55-hectare of land.

== See also ==
- List of hospitals in Malaysia
- Healthcare in Malaysia
