= Batu Gajah =

Town and district capital of Kinta, Perak, Malaysia

- Town and district capital
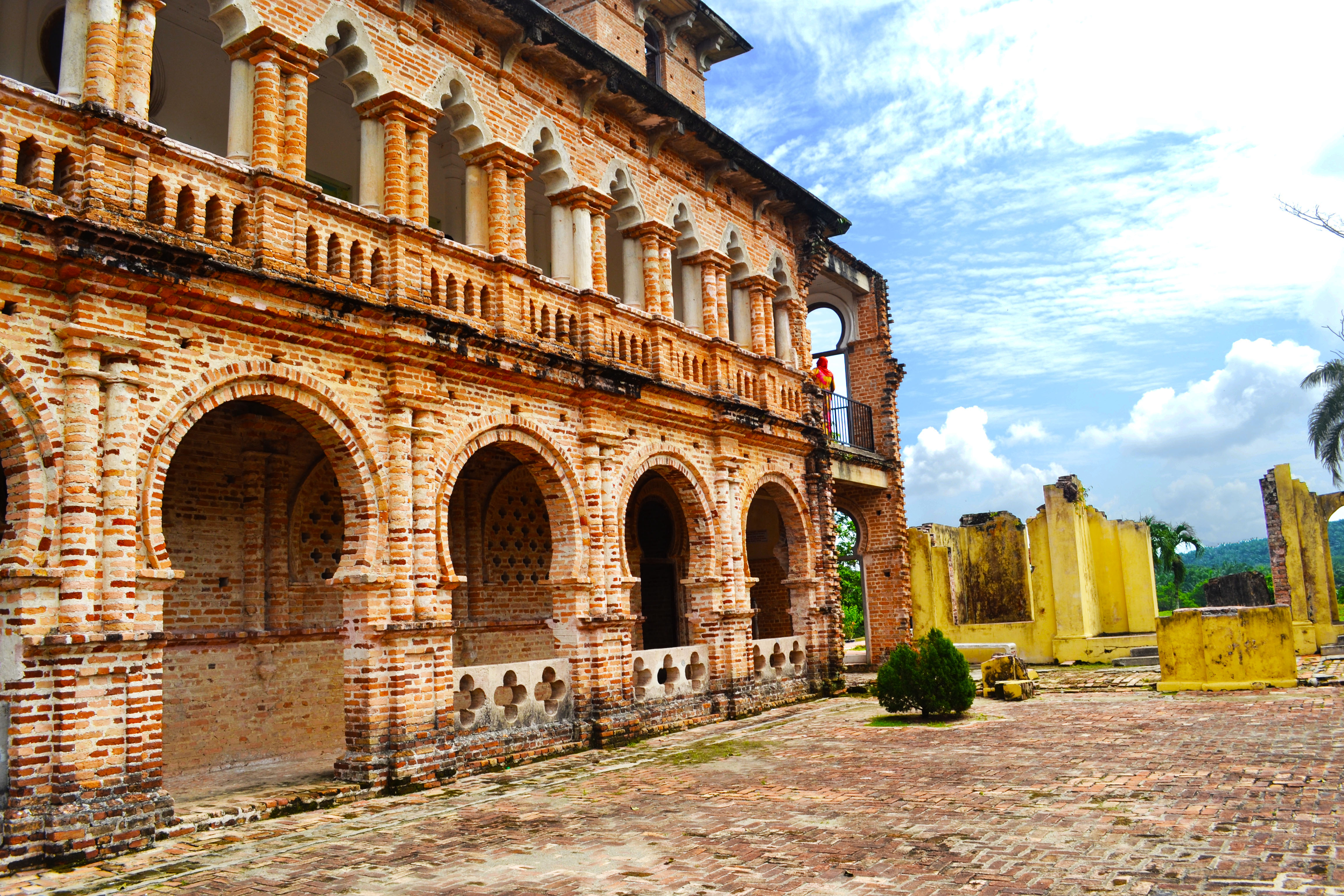
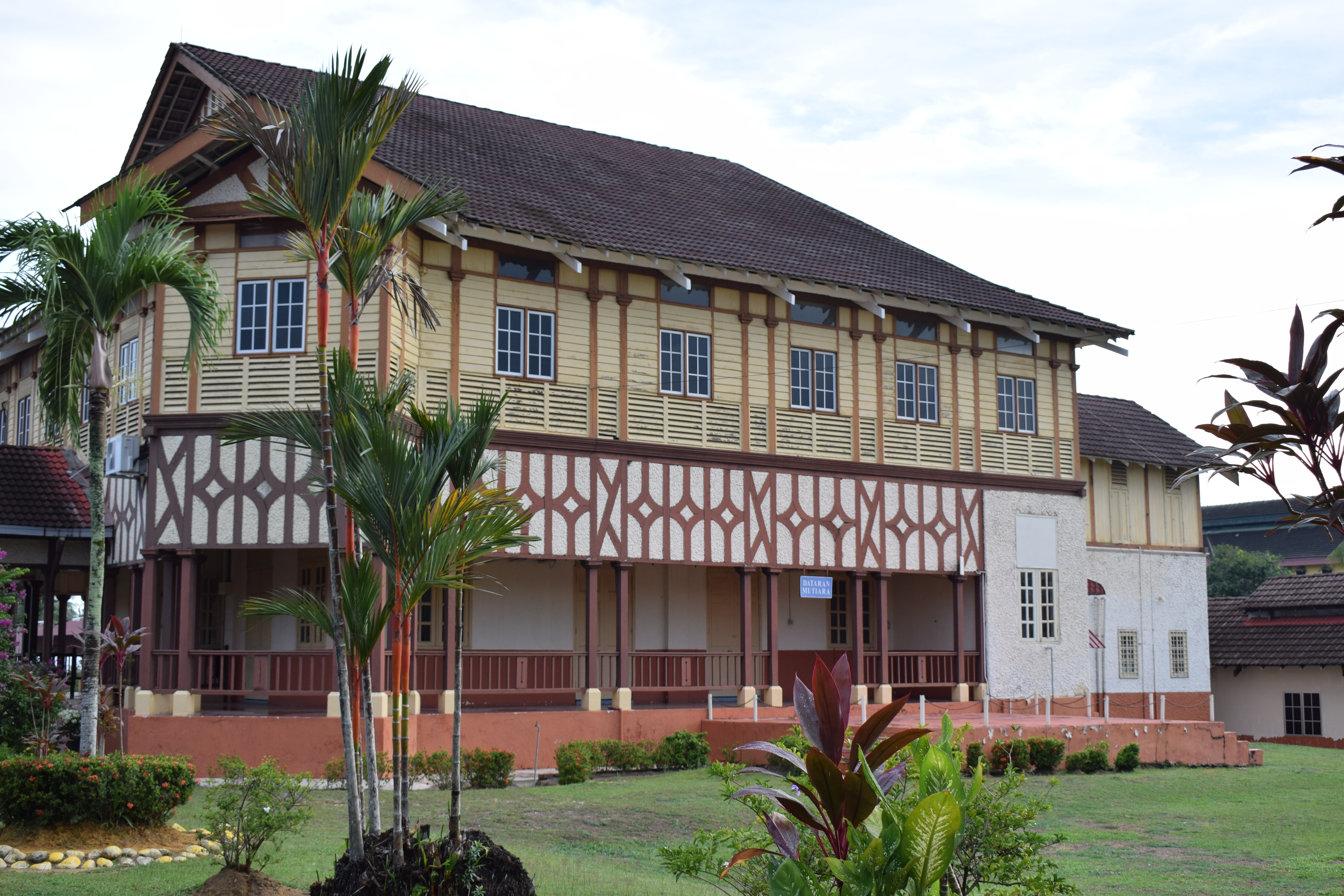
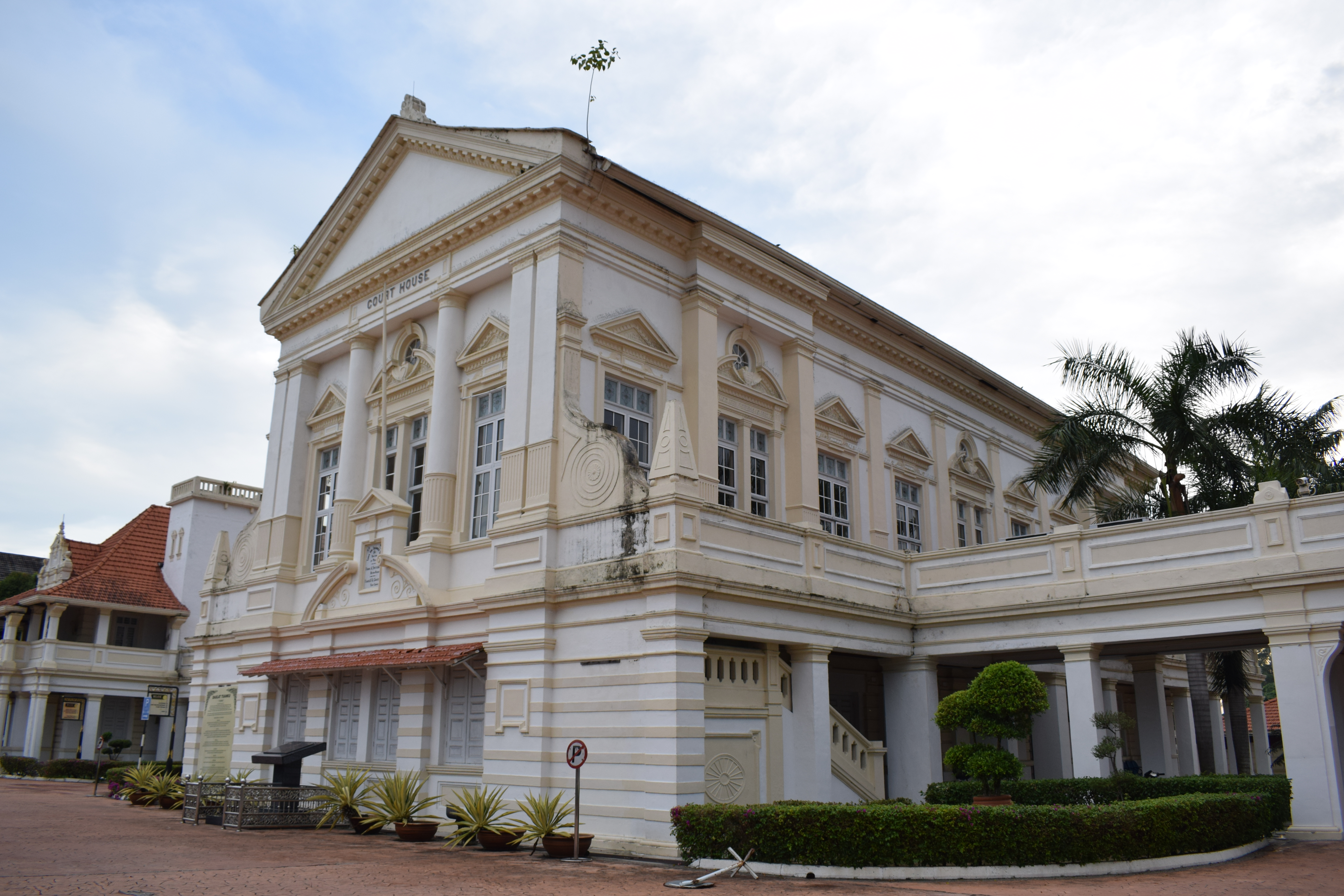
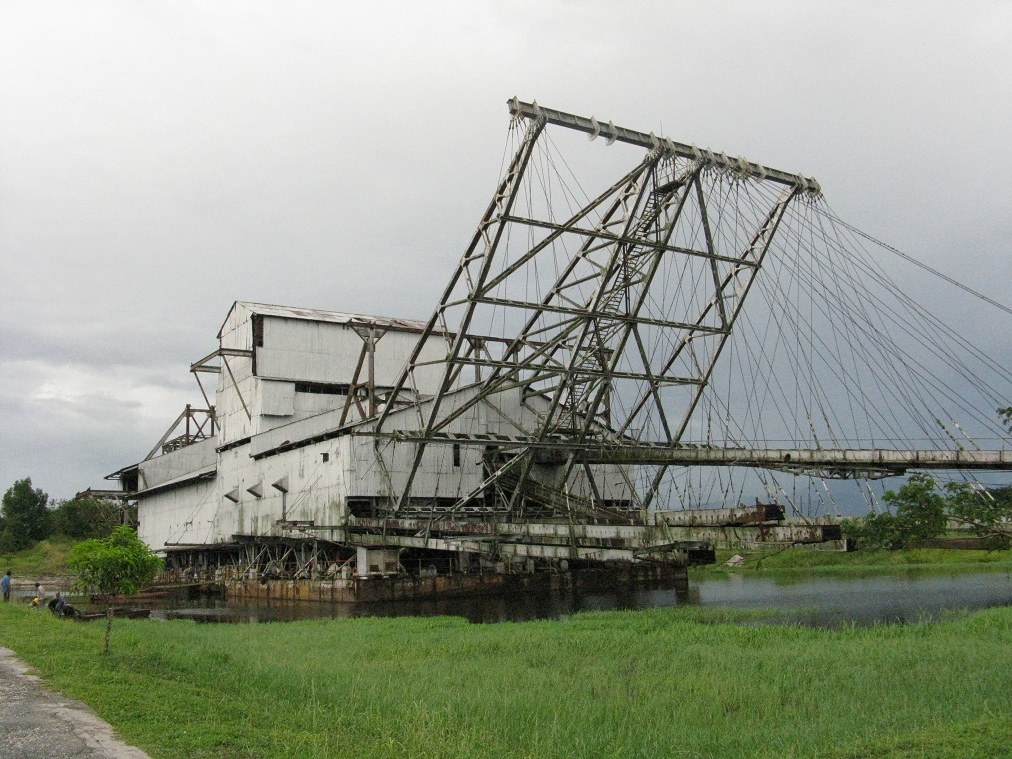
- From top, left to right: Kellie's Castle, Batu Gajah Hospital, Batu Gajah Courthouse, Tanjung Tualang Tin Dredge No. 5

- Seal

- Location within Perak Location within Malaysia
- Coordinates: 4°47′N 101°04′E
- Country: Malaysia
- State: Perak
- District: Kinta

Government
  - Type: Local government
  - Body: Batu Gajah District Council
  - President: Mohamad Razif Ramli

Area
  - Total: 67,470 ha (166,700 acres)

Population (2017)
  - Total: 133,422
  - Density: 197.8/km^{2} (512.2/sq mi)
- Website: www.mdbg.gov.my/ms

Batu Gajah District Council Majlis Daerah Batu Gajah
- Local Government Act 1976

Type
- Type: Municipal Council of Batu Gajah

History
- Founded: 1 September 1977
- Preceded by: Kinta West District Council

Leadership
- President: Mohamad Razif Ramli

Motto
- Mudah, Cepat, Berkesan; Simple, Fast, Effective

Meeting place
- Jalan Haji Abdul Wahab, 31000 Batu Gajah, Perak

Website
- www.mdbg.gov.my

Batu Gajah (population 133,422) is the seat of Kinta District, Perak, Malaysia. It is administered by the Batu Gajah District Council (Malay: Majlis Daerah Batu Gajah), formerly known as Kinta West District Council (Malay: Majlis Daerah Kinta Barat).

== Etymology ==
The name Batu Gajah, meaning "elephant rock" in Malay, is presumably derived from two large boulders (batu, 'stone') found along the Kinta River that resembled elephants (gajah, 'elephant'). Folklore claims that huge elephant figures were made of stones to scare away the elephants that destroyed the villagers' sugarcane crops.

== History ==
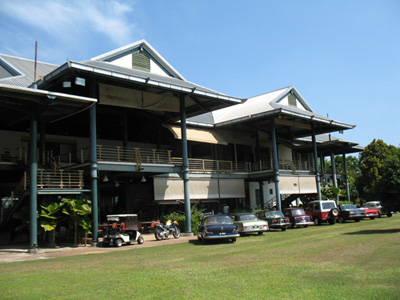
Clearwater Sanctuary Golf Resort Clubhouse

Famous for its tin mining long before independence, Batu Gajah had been an ideal place for Chinese immigrants to stay and work during those years. This contributes to a significant percentage of Chinese in the population of Batu Gajah today. The Indian Settlement village (the name was changed to Kampung Baru Desa Changkat) at Changkat has a large Indian population of Tamils and also a small minority of Punjabis who built a Sikh temple which becomes the pride of the residents and a landmark in the village today.

Batu Gajah had an established pre-war British English school, which was renamed Sultan Yussuf School (SYS) after the war. The Sultan of Perak DYMM Sultan Azlan Muhibbuddin Shah Ibni Almarhum Sultan Yussuf Izzuddin Shah Ghafarullahullah is an alumnus of this school. Formerly known as the Government English School (GES), it was founded by Mr. Malai Perumal Pillay in 1907. The school was built from the rubble of an old prison. Over the years, it has produced many successful students.

Batu Gajah since lies on the bank of Sungai Kinta, a little downstream from the major confluence of Sungai Raya. It started out as one of the many villages of mukim Sungai Terap, developed under its titular chief, the Sri Amar Diraja, the early 19th century.

== Features ==
The attractions here include two golf courses, Kinta Golf Club and Clearwater Sanctuary Golf Course, and nearby pre-independence castle built by a Scottish rubber plantation owner, Sir William Kellie Smith: Kellie's Castle.

There are many hawker stalls and restaurants serving food such as noodles, laksa, and Indian-Muslim mee goreng and mee rebus. Youths spend time at cybercafés and around the local supermarket. In recent years, Western style food franchises opened branches in the town. A supermarket has opened and is in business.

== Development ==
In recent years, Batu Gajah has seen a lot of improvement. In September 2012, Zhuzhou Electric Locomotive Co. Ltd., one of the major electric locomotive manufacturers in China, agreed to build a rolling-stock factory in Batu Gajah.

== Transport ==
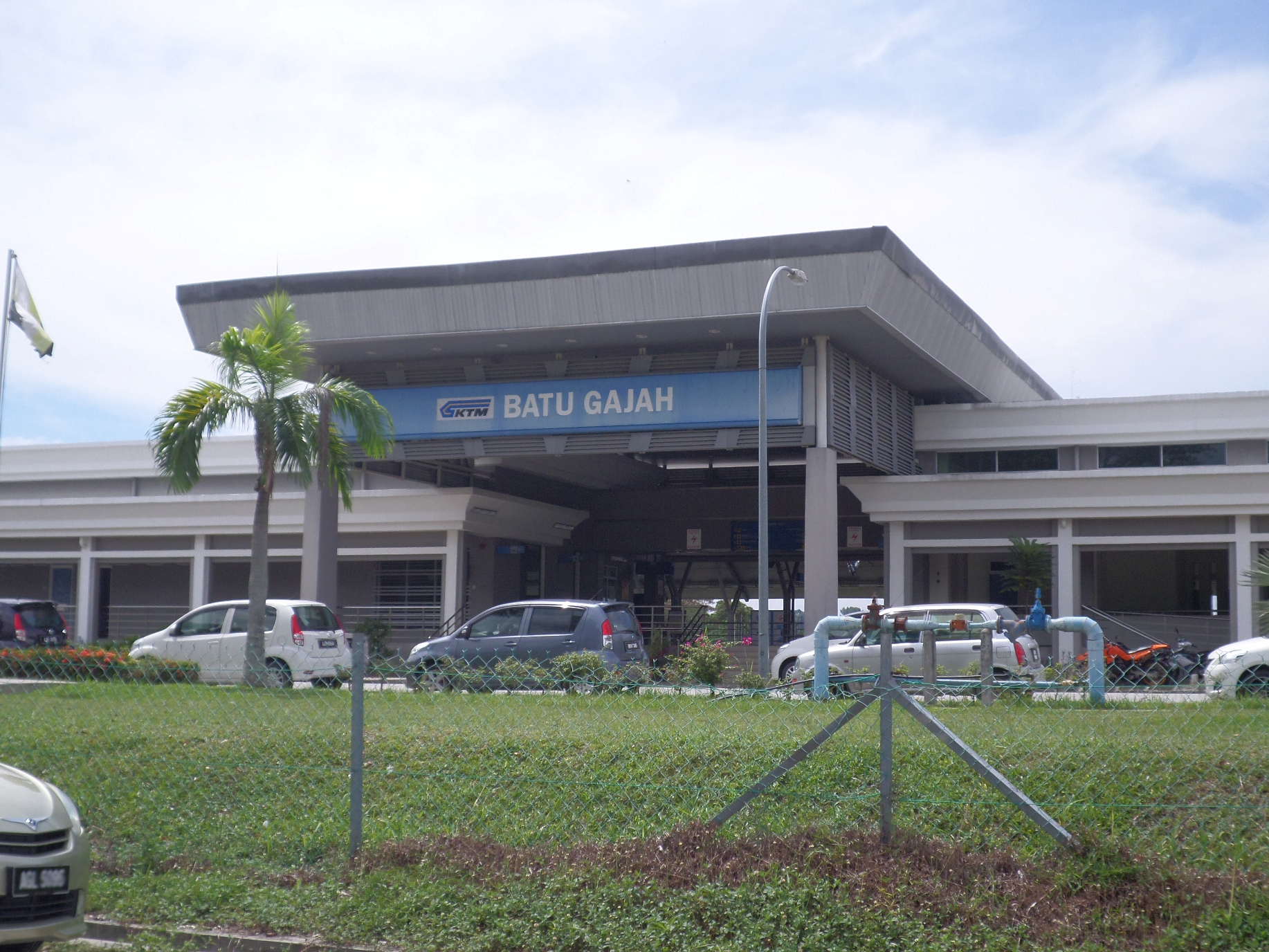
Batu Gajah railway station

In 2007, Batu Gajah received a new Batu Gajah railway station. Near Kampung Pisang at the southern end of town, it replaced the old station at Jalan Pusing which is being turned into a museum and then foodstalls.

In addition, the Malaysian railway operator, Keretapi Tanah Melayu, is constructing a new central workshop in the vicinity of Batu Gajah to replace its facility in Sentul. Located near the new railway station, the centre will house repair workshops, training facilities and staff quarters. The center was scheduled for completion in August 2009 at a projected cost of RM 430 million.

A new four-lane highway connects to the Ipoh-Lumut Highway at Seputeh and ties to the North–South Expressway at Gopeng. The highway passes near the new railway station through Bemban at the West side of town.

== Education ==
=== Primary schools ===
- SK Sultan Yussuf
- SK St Bernadette's Convent
- SK Toh Indera Wangsa Ahmad
- SK Pusing
- SK Tanjung Tualang
- SK Seri Jaya
- SK Bakap
- SJK(T) Changkat
- SJK(T) Ladang Kinta Valley
- SJK(C) Yuk Kwan
- SJK(C) Thung Hon
- SJK(C) Bemban
- SJK(C) Bandar Seri Botani

=== Secondary schools ===
- SMK Sultan Yussuf
- SMK St Bernadette's Convent
- SMK Toh Indera Wangsa Ahmad
- SMJK Yuk Kwan
- SMK Dato' Bendahara CM Yusuf
- SMK Pusing
- SMK Tronoh

=== Tertiary institutions ===
- Batu Gajah Community College
- GIATMARA Batu Gajah

== Landmarks ==
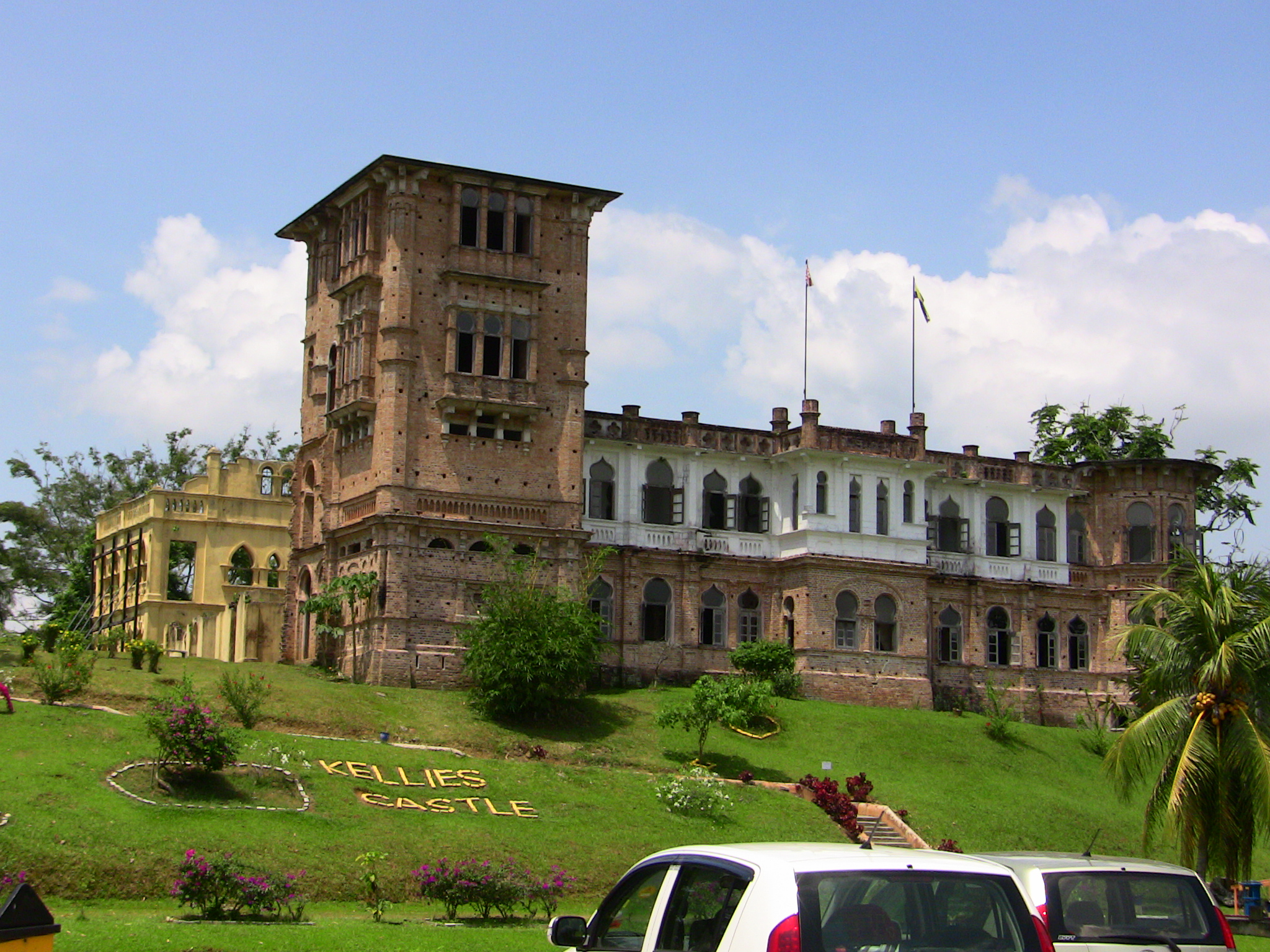
Kellie's Castle

Some heritage buildings and landmarks in Batu Gajah that are famous throughout Perak:

- Kellie's Castle (an old unfinished castle built by a Scottish rubber tycoon)
- Sri Maha Mariamman Hindu Temple of Kinta Kellas Estate
- Tanjung Tualang Tin Dredge No. 5
- Sultan Yussuf School or SMK Sultan Yussuf, the oldest school in Batu Gajah, established in 1907
- Batu Gajah Prison, the second oldest in Malaysia after the Taiping Prison.
- Batu Gajah old courthouse established in 1892
- St. Joseph Catholic Church
- Kinta Golf Course
- Batu Gajah Hospital
- Royale Hotel Batu Gajah
- God's Little Acre: A cemetery for the British pioneers, military servicemen, policemen, tin miners, planters and civilians named after the memorial cross erected by the Perak Planter's Association and others to commemorate their lives in fighting the Communist Insurgency 1949–1960.
- Rumah Lat Gallery, a gallery showcasing the works of Malaysian cartoonist Lat

== Notable people ==
- David Fasken (1932–2006), English cricketer and businessman, was born in Batu Gajah
- Des Lock (born 1949), New Zealand Olympic rower, was born in Batu Gajah
- Dato' Rahim Razali, a renowned artist/director, was born in Batu Gajah
- Amy Mastura, a pop artist and actress, was born in Batu Gajah
- Dato' Sri Augustine Paul, federal court judge known for presiding over the Anwar Ibrahim sodomy trials was born in Batu Gajah
- David Tibet, English poet, singer (Current 93), outsider artist, and painter was born in Batu Gajah
- Toh Chin Chye, a Singaporean politician who served as the Deputy Prime Minister of Singapore from 1959 to 1968 was born in Batu Gajah
- Dato' Dr Afifi al-Akiti, the first Malay to hold a chair at the Faculty of Theology, University of Oxford was born in Batu Gajah
- Tuanku Aishah Rohani, the current Tunku Ampuan Besar of Negeri Sembilan and also Terengganu royal family member was born in Batu Gajah
- Raja Zarith Sofia, the current Raja Permaisuri Agong and the Permaisuri of Johor was born in Batu Gajah Hospital
- Sultan Azlan Shah of Perak, the 34th Sultan of Perak and the ninth Yang di-Pertuan Agong of Malaysia, was born in Batu Gajah

== See also ==
- Kinta District
